= 2008 Philadelphia Freedoms season =

- Conference: 4th Eastern

Record
- 2008 record: 7 wins, 7 losses
- Home record: 3 wins, 4 losses
- Road record: 4 wins, 3 losses
- Games won–lost: 284–270

Team info
- Owner(s): Billie Jean King et al
- General manager: Jeff Harrison
- Coach: Craig Kardon
- Stadium: King of Prussia Mall (capacity: 2,500)

The 2008 Philadelphia Freedoms season was the eighth season of the franchise (in its current incarnation) in World TeamTennis (WTT).

The Freedoms finished the regular season with 7 wins and 7 losses and narrowly missed qualifying for the WTT playoffs. They were eliminated on a standings tiebreaker at the conclusion of the final match of the WTT regular season. The Freedoms were led by Travis Parrott, who was named 2008 WTT Male Rookie of the Year.

== Season recap ==
=== Venus Williams returns, and Freedoms get a new home ===
At the WTT Marquee Player Draft on March 19, 2008, the Freedoms protected Venus Williams. They did not select any other marquee players. The team also announced that its home matches would be played at the King of Prussia Mall in Upper Merion Township, Pennsylvania starting with the 2008 season, after seven years at Cabrini College. A temporary stadium with a seating capacity of approximately 2,500 was to be constructed in the parking lot of The Court, then the smaller of the two buildings that composed the mall, in front of Macy's and Bloomingdale's. There would be room to expand the seating capacity of the stadium should demand merit doing so. Freedoms general manager Jeff Harrison said, "The Freedoms couldn’t be more excited to have the opportunity to play at such recognizable location. While this new site will give us the ability to expand our product, we want to assure our fans that they will continue to view world-class tennis in an intimate, exclusive setting. We are very confident that our new home will have a positive effect on our team, supporters and the community. Our relationship with the King of Prussia Mall allows us to grow awareness of the team and introduce some new fans to our brand of tennis." Owner Billie Jean King said, "The relocation of the Freedoms to King of Prussia Mall allows us to expand our overall fan experience. While we have enjoyed a spectacular run at Cabrini College, we have seen the success of other WTT franchises that showcase their teams in nontraditional settings. The timing is right, and the Philadelphia market is another perfect opportunity for us to continue with this approach. The Freedoms have a new home, and we will be driving more traffic to the mall. It's a win-win for everyone involved."

=== Roster Player Draft ===
The Freedoms were active in the trade market at the WTT Roster Player Draft on April 1, 2008. In the first round, they protected local favorite Lisa Raymond, which left Jamea Jackson unprotected. Since Jackson had substituted for Raymond in 2007, she had to be protected in the first round (Raymond's 2007 position), if the Freedoms intended to keep her. Raymond, on the other hand, could have been protected in the fourth round, if the Freedoms had protected Jackson in the first round. In the second round, the Freedoms protected Travis Parrott, who had substituted for Daniel Nestor in 2007. Parrott was still technically a WTT rookie under the rules in place at the time, even though he played for Sacramento Capitals in 2006, and for the Freedoms in 2007. The Freedoms traded their third round pick to the Delaware Smash for Alex Bogomolov Jr., whom had been selected by the Smash with the seventh pick in the first round. The trade forced the Freedoms to leave 2006 WTT Male Most Valuable Player Nestor and Frédéric Niemeyer unprotected. The Smash used the third round selection it acquired from the Freedoms to draft Madison Brengle. In the fourth round, the Freedoms selected Audra Cohen and left Olga Savchuk unprotected. The Freedoms did not select any roster-exempt players.

=== Substitutes for Raymond ===
On July 3, 2008, with Lisa Raymond's availability in doubt, because she and her partner Samantha Stosur reached the semifinals of the ladies' doubles tournament at Wimbedon, the Freedoms signed Carly Gullickson and Mouna Sabri as substitute players to replace her in the first two matches of the season. On July 6, the Freedoms signed Robin Stephenson as a substitute player to fill in for Raymond, who had lost the Wimbledon ladies' doubles final the previous day, in the third match of the season. The Freedoms expected to have both Raymond and Venus Williams, who with her sister Serena defeated Raymond and Stosur in that Wimbledon doubles final, available for the fourth match of the regular season on July 8. Raymond and Williams were to play women's doubles together in that match as well as the following two matches on the Freedoms' schedule.

=== A rough start ===
The Freedoms opened their season on July 4, 2008, with a home match against the expansion Washington Kastles, which was the inaugural match for Washington. After falling behind 15–9 after three sets, the Freedoms started a comeback when Audra Cohen and Carly Gullickson won a tiebreaker in the fourth set of women's doubles. Gullickson and Travis Parrott followed with a 5–3 set win in mixed doubles to send the match to overtime with the Kastles leading 22–19. Mashona Washington and Scott Oudsema clinched a 23–19 victory for the Kastles when they won the first game of overtime.

The following evening, the Freedoms met the Springfield Lasers on the road and raced to a 15–8 lead after three sets. Alex Bogomolov Jr. won the opening set of men's singles and teamed with Parrott to win the third set of men's doubles. Cohen and Parrott won the second set of mixed doubles. After the Lasers won the fourth set of women's singles, the Freedoms still held and 18–13 lead. Shenay Perry and Chanelle Scheepers won a tiebreaker over Cohen and Mouna Sabri in the final set of women's doubles to send the match to overtime with the Freedoms leading, 22–18. Perry and Scheepers then won four straight overtime games and took the super tiebreaker, 7–2, to hand the Freedoms a shocking 23–22 loss.

On July 7, 2008, the Freedoms visited the New York Sportimes and won three of the five sets. However, Cohen's 5–0 set loss to Bethanie Mattek in the fourth set of women's singles meant the Freedoms still trailed, 20–18, after Robin Stephenson and Parrott won a tiebreaker in the final set of mixed doubles to send the match to overtime. Mattek and Brian Wilson won the first game of overtime to give the Sportimes a 21–18 victory and drop the Freedoms' record to 0 wins and 3 losses.

=== Williams and Raymond arrive ===
Venus Williams and Lisa Raymond were both available for the third and final match of the Freedoms' early-season three-match road trip, and they had an immediate impact. The Freedoms visited the Delaware Smash on July 8, 2008, in the opener of a home-and-home series. Williams teamed with Travis Parrott for a 5–3 set win in the opening set of mixed doubles. She followed with a 5–2 set win in women's singles. Parrott and Alex Bogomolov Jr. won the third set of men's doubles, 5–3. Williams and Raymond earned a 5–2 set win in the fourth set of women's doubles. After the Smash won a tiebreaker in the closing set of men's singles, the match went to overtime with the Freedoms holding a commanding 24–15 lead. Bogomolov won the first game of overtime to secure the Freedoms' first victory of the season.

The Freedoms hosted the Smash the following evening in a match that was much tighter. Williams and Parrott dropped the opening set of mixed doubles, 5–2. Williams needed a tiebreaker to beat 18-year-old Madison Brengle in the second set of women's doubles. Bogomolov and Parrott gave the Freedoms a 12–11 lead with a 5–2 set win in the third set of men's doubles. The Smash surged to a 16–14 lead, when Brengle and Liezel Huber won the fourth set of women's doubles over Williams and Raymond. Bogomolov rescued the Freedoms by dominating the final set of men's singles, 5–1, to clinch a 19–17 win.

Paying for the fourth consecutive day in the fourth different venue, the Freedoms visited the Boston Lobsters on July 10, 2008. Williams gave them an early lead when she won an opening-set tiebreaker in women's singles and then teamed with Raymond for a 5–2 set win in women's doubles. The Lobsters worked their way back into the match by winning the final three sets, the last two in tiebreakers, to send the match to a super tiebreaker. Bogomolov and Parrott won a match-deciding point to win the super tiebreaker, 7–6, and give the Freedoms a 22–21 triumph. The victory evened the Freedoms' record at 3 wins and 3 losses.

=== Stretch run ===
The Freedoms embarked on a four-match homestand with a record of 4 wins and 4 losses, having won four of their previous five matches. However, just as quickly as they appeared to have turned their season in the right direction, the Freedoms suffered another untimely three-match losing streak. In each of the three matches, the Freedoms lost four of the five full sets played. The closest of the three matches was a five-game overtime loss to the Kansas City Explorers. With three matches remaining on their schedule, the Freedoms' record stood at 4 wins and 7 losses.

In the final match of the homestand on July 19, 2008, the Freedoms, without warning, played their best match of the season against the New York Buzz, who entered the match with 7 wins and 3 losses. Alex Bogomolov Jr. and Travis Parrott started the match with a 5–2 set win in the opening set of men's doubles. Audra Cohen won the women's singles set, 5–3. Parrott teamed with Lisa Raymond for a 5–2 set win in the third set of mixed doubles. Raymond and Cohen won a tiebreaker in the fourth set of women's doubles. Bogomolov completed the five-set sweep for the Freedoms by winning a men's singles tiebreaker in the closing set to secure a 25–15 victory.

The next evening, the Freedoms visited the Washington Kastles, who had 5 wins and 6 losses and were in the thick of the race for the WTT wild card playoff berth. Bogomolov won the opening set of men's singles and teamed with Parrott to win the third set of men's doubles. Raymond paired with Cohen to win the second set of women's doubles and with Parrott to win the fourth set of mixed doubles. After Cohen lost the final set of women's singles, she clinched a 23–19 triumph by winning the first game of overtime.

The Freedoms closed their regular season on July 21, 2008, with a dominant home win over the Delaware Smash. Raymond teamed with Parrott for a 5–2 set win in the third set of mixed doubles and with Cohen for a 5–1 set win in the fourth set of women's doubles. Bogomolov paired with Parrott for a 5–3 set win in the opening set of men's doubles and closed out the match by posting a dominant 5–1 margin in the closing set of men's singles. The 23–12 victory evened the Freedoms' record at 7 wins and 7 losses and kept them alive in the WTT playoff race.

=== Elimination from playoff contention ===
With their schedule completed, the Freedoms became interested spectators on the final day of the WTT regular season. They were fourth in the Eastern Conference, and their record stood at 7–7, identical to that of the Boston Lobsters, who held a tiebreaker edge over them. The Washington Kastles entered the final day fifth in the Eastern Conference at 5–8 and were eliminated. The Newport Beach Breakers held third place in the Western Conference at 5–8 and were also eliminated. It would seem that the Freedoms had no hope and that the Lobsters had already clinched the wild card. However, the wild card berth was to be awarded to the team that had the highest overall seeding without finishing in the top two places in its conference. That is not necessarily identical to the third place team with the best record. In the overall seeding of the teams, it remained possible for the 7–6 Sacramento Capitals, who had already clinched second place in the Western Conference, to finish 7–7, creating a three-way tie with the Lobsters and Freedoms. The games won against common opponents tiebreaker step would apply, and the Freedoms would be first with 157, the Lobsters second with 152 and the Capitals third with 133 plus the number of games they would win in a loss to the Sportimes. The maximum number of wins against common opponents the Capitals could reach in a loss was 157. Therefore, the tiebreaker would have given the Freedoms the wild card and the #4 seed in the WTT playoffs. The Capitals, as the second-place team in the Western Conference, would have been the #5 seed. The Lobsters would be eliminated, even though they held a head-to-head tiebreaker edge over the Freedoms, and even if they finished second in the three-team tiebreaker for the #4 and #5 seeds. Therefore, the Freedoms needed a Sportimes victory, which would give the Capitals a 7–7 record and create the three-way tie.

In a tightly contested match that ended the WTT regular season, which would have given the Sportimes the Eastern Conference title had they won, the Capitals prevailed in a final-set tiebreaker, 20–19. The Freedoms were eliminated from playoff contention on what was literally the season's final point played.

== Event chronology ==
- March 19, 2008: The Freedoms announced their home matches would be played at the King of Prussia Mall.
- March 19, 2008: The Freedoms protected Venus Williams in the WTT Marquee Player Draft.
- April 1, 2008: The Freedoms protected Lisa Raymond and Travis Parrott and selected Audra Cohen at the WTT Roster Player Draft. They traded their third-round selection in the draft for Alex Bogomolov Jr. Jamea Jackson, Daniel Nestor, Frédéric Niemeyer and Olga Savchuk were left unprotected.
- July 3, 2008: The Freedoms signed Carly Gullickson and Mouna Sabri as substitute players.
- July 6, 2008: The Freedoms signed Robin Stephenson as a substitute player.
- July 13, 2008: The Freedoms released Robin Stephenson.
- July 23, 2008: With a record of 7 wins and 7 losses, the Freedoms were eliminated from playoff contention, when the Sacramento Capitals defeated the New York Sportimes, 20–19.

== Draft picks ==
Since the Freedoms had the worse regular-season record of the two 2007 WTT conference championship match losers, they selected fourth from the bottom (eighth) in each round of WTT's two drafts.

=== Marquee Player Draft ===
In the Marquee Player Draft on March 19, 2008, the Freedoms protected Venus Williams in the first round. They did not make a second-round selection.

=== Roster Player Draft ===
The league conducted its 2008 Roster Player Draft on April 1, in Miami, Florida. The selections made by the Freedoms are shown in the table below.

Round	No.	Overall	Player chosen	Prot?
1	8	8	(United States) Lisa Raymond	Y
2	8	19	(United States) Travis Parrott	Y
4	8	41	(United States) Audra Cohen	N

The Freedoms traded their third-round selection (30th overall) to the Delaware Smash for American Alex Bogomolov Jr.

The Freedoms did not select any roster-exempt players.

== Match log ==
Legend
Freedoms Win	Freedoms Loss
Home team in CAPS

Match	Date	Venue and location	Result and details	Record
1	July 4	King of Prussia Mall; Upper Merion Township, Pennsylvania	Washington Kastles 23, PHILADELPHIA FREEDOMS 19 (overtime) * MS: Vince Spadea (Kastles) 5, Alex Bogomolov Jr. (Freedoms) 3 * WS: Mashona Washington (Kastles) 5, Audra Cohen (Freedoms) 3 * MD: Scott Oudsema/Vince Spadea (Kastles) 5, Alex Bogomolov Jr./Travis Parrott (Freedoms) 3 * WD: Audra Cohen/Carly Gullickson (Freedoms) 5, Mashona Washington/Sacha Jones (Kastles) 4 * XD: Carly Gullickson/Travis Parrott (Freedoms) 5, Mashona Washington/Scott Oudsema (Kastles) 3 * OT - XD: Mashona Washington/Scott Oudsema (Kastles) 1, Carly Gullickson/Travis Parrott (Freedoms) 0	0–1
2	July 5	Mediacom Stadium at Cooper Tennis Complex; Springfield, Missouri	SPRINGFIELD LASERS 23, Philadelphia Freedoms 22 (super tiebreaker, 7–2) * MS: Alex Bogomolov Jr. (Freedoms) 5, Glenn Weiner (Lasers) 3 * XD: Audra Cohen/Travis Parrott (Freedoms) 5, Shenay Perry/Todd Perry (Lasers) 2 * MD: Alex Bogomolov Jr./Travis Parrott (Freedoms) 5, Glenn Weiner/Todd Perry (Lasers) 3 * WS: Chanelle Scheepers (Lasers) 5, Audra Cohen (Freedoms) 3 * WD: Shenay Perry/Chanelle Scheepers (Lasers) 5, Audra Cohen/Mouna Sabri (Freedoms) 4 * OT - WD: Shenay Perry/Chanelle Scheepers (Lasers) 4, Audra Cohen/Mouna Sabri (Freedoms) 0 * STB - WD: Shenay Perry/Chanelle Scheepers (Lasers) 7, Audra Cohen/Mouna Sabri (Freedoms) 2	0–2
3	July 7	Sportime Stadium at Harbor Island; Mamaroneck, New York	NEW YORK SPORTIMES 21, Philadelphia Freedoms 18 (overtime) * MD: Brian Wilson/Jesse Witten (Sportimes) 5, Alex Bogomolov Jr./Travis Parrott (Freedoms) 3 * WD: Audra Cohen/Robin Stephenson (Freedoms) 5, Bethanie Mattek/Hana Šromová (Sportimes) 3 * MS: Alex Bogomolov Jr. (Freedoms) 5, Jesse Witten (Sportimes) 3 * WS: Bethanie Mattek (Sportimes) 5, Audra Cohen (Freedoms) 0 * XD: Robin Stephenson/Travis Parrott (Freedoms) 5, Bethanie Mattek/Brian Wilson (Sportimes) 4 *** Robin Stephenson substituted for Audra Cohen at 4–4 * OT - XD: Bethanie Mattek/Brian Wilson (Sportimes) 1, Robin Stephenson/Travis Parrott (Freedoms) 0	0–3
4	July 8	DuPont Country Club; Brandywine Hundred, Delaware	Philadelphia Freedoms 25, DELAWARE SMASH 15 (overtime) * XD: Venus Williams/Travis Parrott (Freedoms) 5, Liezel Huber/Chris Haggard (Smash) 3 * WS: Venus Williams (Freedoms) 5, Madison Brengle (Smash) 2 * MD: Alex Bogomolov Jr./Travis Parrott (Freedoms) 5, Chris Haggard/Ryler DeHeart (Smash) 3 * WD: Venus Williams/Lisa Raymond (Freedoms) 5, Christina Fusano/Liezel Huber (Smash) 2 *** Christina Fusano substituted for Madison Brengle at 1–1 * MS: Ryler DeHeart (Smash) 5, Alex Bogomolov Jr. (Freedoms) 4 * OT - MS: Alex Bogomolov Jr. (Freedoms) 1, Ryler DeHeart (Smash) 0	1–3
5	July 9	King of Prussia Mall; Upper Merion Township, Pennsylvania	PHILADELPHIA FREEDOMS 19, Delaware Smash 17 * XD: Liezel Huber/Chris Haggard (Smash) 5, Venus Williams/Travis Parrott (Freedoms) 2 * WS: Venus Williams (Freedoms) 5, Madison Brengle (Smash) 4 * MD: Alex Bogomolov Jr./Travis Parrott (Freedoms) 5, Chris Haggard/Ryler DeHeart (Smash) 2 * WD: Liezel Huber/Madison Brengle (Smash) 5, Venus Williams/Lisa Raymond (Freedoms) 2 * MS: Alex Bogomolov Jr. (Freedoms) 5, Ryler DeHeart (Smash) 1	2–3
6	July 10	Ferncroft Country Club; Middleton, Massachusetts	Philadelphia Freedoms 22, BOSTON LOBSTERS 21 (super tiebreaker, 7–6) * WS: Venus Williams (Freedoms) 5, Marie-Ève Pelletier (Lobsters) 4 * WD: Venus Williams/Lisa Raymond (Freedoms) 5, Raquel Kops-Jones/Marie-Ève Pelletier (Lobsters) 2 * XD: Raquel Kops-Jones/Amir Hadad (Lobsters) 5, Venus Williams/Travis Parrott (Freedoms) 3 * MS: Jan-Michael Gambill (Lobsters) 5, Alex Bogomolov Jr. (Freedoms) 4 * MD: Amir Hadad/Jan-Michael Gambill (Lobsters) 5, Alex Bogomolov Jr./Travis Parrott (Freedoms) 4 * STB - MD: Alex Bogomolov Jr./Travis Parrott (Freedoms) 7, Amir Hadad/Jan-Michael Gambill (Lobsters) 6	3–3
7	July 12	Sportime Stadium at Harbor Island; Mamaroneck, New York	NEW YORK SPORTIMES 19, Philadelphia Freedoms 18 (super tiebreaker, 7–5) * MD: Alex Bogomolov Jr./Travis Parrott (Freedoms) 5, Brian Wilson/Jesse Witten (Sportimes) 1 * WD: Lisa Raymond/Audra Cohen (Freedoms) 5, Bethanie Mattek/Hana Šromová (Sportimes) 4 * MS: Jesse Witten (Sportimes) 5, Alex Bogomolov Jr. (Freedoms) 2 * XD: Lisa Raymond/Travis Parrott (Freedoms) 5, Bethanie Mattek/Brian Wilson (Sportimes) 3 * WS: Bethanie Mattek (Sportimes) 5, Lisa Raymond (Freedoms) 1 * STB - WS: Bethanie Mattek (Sportimes) 7, Lisa Raymond (Freedoms) 5	3–4
8	July 13	Washington Avenue Armory Sports and Convention Arena; Albany, New York	Philadelphia Freedoms 22, NEW YORK BUZZ 18 (overtime) * XD: Lisa Raymond/Travis Parrott (Freedoms) 5, Yaroslava Shvedova/Nathan Healey (Buzz) 3 * MS: Nathan Healey (Buzz) 5, Alex Bogomolov Jr. (Freedoms) 4 * WD: Lisa Raymond/Audra Cohen (Freedoms) 5, Gabriela Navrátilová/Yaroslava Shvedova (Buzz) 3 * WS: Audra Cohen (Freedoms) 5, Yaroslava Shvedova (Buzz) 2 * MD: Patrick Briaud/Nathan Healey (Buzz) 5, Alex Bogomolov Jr./Travis Parrott (Freedoms) 2 * OT - MD: Alex Bogomolov Jr./Travis Parrott (Freedoms) 1, Patrick Briaud/Nathan Healey (Buzz) 0	4–4
9	July 14	King of Prussia Mall; Upper Merion Township, Pennsylvania	New York Sportimes 21, PHILADELPHIA FREEDOMS 15 * MD: Alex Bogomolov Jr./Travis Parrott (Freedoms) 5, John McEnroe/Brian Wilson (Sportimes) 1 * WD: Milagros Sequera/Hana Šromová (Sportimes) 5, Lisa Raymond/Audra Cohen (Freedoms) 4 * MS: John McEnroe (Sportimes) 5, Alex Bogomolov Jr. (Freedoms) 4 * WS: Milagros Sequera (Sportimes) 5, Lisa Raymond (Freedoms) 1 *** Lisa Raymond substituted for Audra Cohen at 0–3 * XD: Milagros Sequera/Brian Wilson (Sportimes) 5, Lisa Raymond/Travis Parrott (Freedoms) 1	4–5
10	July 16	King of Prussia Mall; Upper Merion Township, Pennsylvania	Kansas City Explorers 23, PHILADELPHIA FREEDOMS 18 (overtime) * MD: Bob Bryan/Mike Bryan (Explorers) 5, Alex Bogomolov Jr./Travis Parrott (Freedoms) 4 * WD: Rennae Stubbs/Květa Peschke (Explorers) 5, Lisa Raymond/Audra Cohen (Freedoms) 2 * XD: Rennae Stubbs/Mike Bryan (Explorers) 5, Lisa Raymond/Travis Parrott (Freedoms) 3 * WS: Květa Peschke (Explorers) 5, Audra Cohen (Freedoms) 4 * MS: Alex Bogomolov Jr. (Freedoms) 5, Dušan Vemić (Explorers) 2 * OT - MS: Dušan Vemić (Explorers) 1, Alex Bogomolov Jr. (Freedoms) 0	4–6
11	July 17	King of Prussia Mall; Upper Merion Township, Pennsylvania	Boston Lobsters 23, PHILADELPHIA FREEDOMS 15 * MD: Amir Hadad/Jan-Michael Gambill (Lobsters) 5, Alex Bogomolov Jr./Travis Parrott (Freedoms) 3 * WS: Marie-Ève Pelletier (Lobsters) 5, Audra Cohen (Freedoms) 2 * XD: Lisa Raymond/Travis Parrott (Freedoms) 5, Raquel Kops-Jones/Amir Hadad (Lobsters) 3 * WD: Raquel Kops-Jones/Marie-Ève Pelletier (Lobsters) 5, Lisa Raymond/Audra Cohen (Freedoms) 1 * MS: Jan-Michael Gambill (Lobsters) 5, Alex Bogomolov Jr. (Freedoms) 4	4–7
12	July 19	King of Prussia Mall; Upper Merion Township, Pennsylvania	PHILADELPHIA FREEDOMS 25, New York Buzz 15 * MD: Alex Bogomolov Jr./Travis Parrott (Freedoms) 5, Nathan Healey/Patrick Briaud (Buzz) 2 * WS: Audra Cohen (Freedoms) 5, Yaroslava Shvedova (Buzz) 3 * XD: Lisa Raymond/Travis Parrott (Freedoms) 5, Yaroslava Shvedova/Nathan Healey (Buzz) 2 * WD: Lisa Raymond/Audra Cohen (Freedoms) 5, Gabriela Navrátilová/Yaroslava Shvedova (Buzz) 4 * MS: Alex Bogomolov Jr. (Freedoms) 5, Jay Udwadia (Buzz) 4 *** Jay Udwadia substituted for Nathan Healey at 4–4	5–7
13	July 20	Kastles Stadium at CityCenterDC; Washington, District of Columbia	Philadelphia Freedoms 23, WASHINGTON KASTLES 19 (overtime) * MS: Alex Bogomolov Jr. (Freedoms) 5, Scott Oudsema (Kastles) 3 * WD: Lisa Raymond/Audra Cohen (Freedoms) 5, Mashona Washington/Sacha Jones (Kastles) 4 * MD: Alex Bogomolov Jr./Travis Parrott (Freedoms) 5, Scott Oudsema/Justin Gimelstob (Kastles) 3 * XD: Lisa Raymond/Travis Parrott (Freedoms) 5, Mashona Washington/Justin Gimelstob (Kastles) 4 * WS: Sacha Jones (Kastles) 5, Audra Cohen (Freedoms) 2 * OT - WS: Audra Cohen (Freedoms) 1, Sacha Jones (Kastles) 0	6–7
14	July 21	King of Prussia Mall; Upper Merion Township, Pennsylvania	PHILADELPHIA FREEDOMS 23, Delaware Smash 12 * MD: Alex Bogomolov Jr./Travis Parrott (Freedoms) 5, Chris Haggard/Josh Cohen (Smash) 3 * WS: Madison Brengle (Smash) 5, Audra Cohen (Freedoms) 3 * XD: Lisa Raymond/Travis Parrott (Freedoms) 5, Christina Fusano/Chris Haggard (Smash) 2 * WD: Lisa Raymond/Audra Cohen (Freedoms) 5, Christina Fusano/Madison Brengle (Smash) 1 * MS: Alex Bogomolov Jr. (Freedoms) 5, Josh Cohen (Smash) 1	7–7

== Team personnel ==
=== On-court personnel ===
- (United States) Craig Kardon – Coach
- (United States) Alex Bogomolov Jr.
- (United States) Audra Cohen
- (United States) Carly Gullickson (Note: Player appeared in fewer than three matches during the season as a substitute player and was not eligible to be protected in the following year's draft.)
- (United States) Travis Parrott
- (United States) Lisa Raymond
- (Morocco) Mouna Sabri
- (United States) Robin Stephenson (Note: Player was released by the team during the regular season after appearing in fewer than three matches as a substitute player. She was signed by the New York Sportimes on July 13, 2008. She was not eligible to be protected in the following year's draft.)
- (United States) Venus Williams

=== Front office ===
- Billie Jean King – Owner
- Jeff Harrison – General Manager

== Statistics ==
Players are listed in order of their game-winning percentage provided they played in at least 40% of the Freedoms' games in that event, which is the WTT minimum for qualification for league leaders in individual statistical categories.

Men's singles

Player	GP	GW	GL	PCT
Alex Bogomolov Jr.	114	61	53	.535
Total	114	61	53	.535

Women's singles

Player	GP	GW	GL	PCT
Audra Cohen	71	28	43	.394
Venus Williams	25	15	10	.600
Lisa Raymond	10	2	8	.200
Total	106	45	61	.425

Men's doubles

Player	GP	GW	GL	PCT
Alex Bogomolov Jr.	109	61	48	.560
Travis Parrott	109	61	48	.560
Total	109	61	48	.560

Women's doubles

Player	GP	GW	GL	PCT
Lisa Raymond	84	44	40	.524
Audra Cohen	94	46	48	.489
Robin Stephenson	8	5	3	.625
Venus Williams	21	12	9	.571
Carly Gullickson	9	5	4	.556
Mouna Sabri	14	4	10	.286
Total	115	58	57	.504

Mixed doubles

Player	GP	GW	GL	PCT
Lisa Raymond	61	34	27	.557
Travis Parrott	110	59	51	.536
Audra Cohen	15	9	6	.600
Carly Gullickson	9	5	4	.556
Robin Stephenson	2	1	1	.500
Venus Williams	23	10	13	.435
Total	110	59	51	.536

Team totals

Event	GP	GW	GL	PCT
Men's singles	114	61	53	.535
Women's singles	106	45	61	.425
Men's doubles	109	61	48	.560
Women's doubles	115	58	57	.504
Mixed doubles	110	59	51	.536
Total	554	284	270	.513

== Transactions ==
- March 19, 2008: The Freedoms protected Venus Williams in the WTT Marquee Player Draft.
- April 1, 2008: The Freedoms protected Lisa Raymond and Travis Parrott and selected Audra Cohen at the WTT Roster Player Draft. They traded their third-round selection in the draft for Alex Bogomolov Jr. Jamea Jackson, Daniel Nestor, Frédéric Niemeyer and Olga Savchuk were left unprotected.
- July 3, 2008: The Freedoms signed Carly Gullickson and Mouna Sabri as substitute players.
- July 6, 2008: The Freedoms signed Robin Stephenson as a substitute player.
- July 13, 2008: The Freedoms released Robin Stephenson.

== Individual honors and achievements ==
Travis Parrott was named WTT Male Rookie of the Year.

== See also ==
- Sports in Philadelphia
