= 2008 New York Buzz season =

World TeamTennis champions

Eastern Conference champions
- Conference: 1st Eastern

Record
- 2008 record: 10 wins, 4 losses
- Home record: 6 wins, 1 loss
- Road record: 4 wins, 3 losses
- Games won–lost: 305–251

Team info
- Owner(s): Nitty Singh
- President/CEO: Nitty Singh
- General manager: Nitty Singh
- Coach: Jay Udwadia
- Stadium: Washington Avenue Armory Sports and Convention Arena (capacity: 4,000)

The 2008 New York Buzz season was the 14th season of the franchise in World TeamTennis (WTT).

Led by 2008 WTT Female Rookie of the Year Yaroslava Shvedova, the Buzz had 10 wins and 4 losses, winning the Eastern Conference championship. It went on to defeat the Kansas City Explorers, 21–18, in the WTT Final to win its first King Trophy as WTT champions.

== Season recap ==
=== Drafts ===
For the third straight season, the Buzz passed on making a selection in the Marquee Player Draft. In the Roster Player Draft, the defending Eastern Conference champions left 2007 WTT Championship Most Valuable Player Rik de Voest unprotected in the first round and instead chose Yaroslava Shvedova. Nathan Healey was taken in the second round, leaving Ashley Fisher unprotected. The Buzz protected Gabriela Navrátilová in the third round, which gave the team two full-time female players and forced it to leave Gréta Arn unprotected. Vladimir Obradović was the Buzz's final selection in the draft. The team did not select any roster-exempt players. The Buzz named Jay Udwadia as its new head coach.

=== Move to Albany ===
On May 8, 2008, the Buzz announced that after 13 seasons at CDPHP Tennis Complex in Schenectady, New York, it would move its home matches to the larger Washington Avenue Armory Sports and Convention Arena in Albany. Buzz ownership said that it moved to the air-conditioned indoor arena which seats about 4,000 people for tennis, because it has secure parking to serve the team's growing fan base and to "give the team much more visibility and awareness and help increase the level of hospitality the Buzz wish to provide."

=== Briaud replaces Obradović ===
In June 2008, Vladimir Obradović suffered a knee injury that would cause him to miss the entire season. Just two days before the season opener, the Buzz signed Patrick Briaud to take Obradović's place on the roster.

=== Regular season ===
During the regular season, the Buzz did not have a winning streak of more than three matches but never lost consecutive matches. The team relied heavily on Yaroslava Shvedova and Nathan Healey, both of whom typically played three of the five sets in each match, while Gabriela Navrátilová and Patrick Briaud usually only played women's and men's doubles.

The Buzz started the season with two road victories before winning its home opener against the Boston Lobsters. On July 8, the Buzz visited the New York Sportimes and found themselves trailing, 15–10, after dropping the first three sets. Shvedova won the fourth set of women's singles, and Healey won the fifth set of men's singles to cut the Sportimes' lead to 21–20 and send the match to overtime. Jesse Witten took the first game of overtime from Healey to give the Sportimes the victory and hand the Buzz its first loss of the season, dropping its record to 3 wins and 1 loss.

The Buzz bounced back the next evening at home against the expansion Washington Kastles, but not without falling behind early again. The Kastles won the first two sets and then sent Serena Williams onto the court to face Shvedova in women's singles. Williams took the set in a tiebreaker to give the Kastles a 15–11 lead. Shvedova and Healey won a tiebreaker in mixed doubles to cut the lead to 19–16, and Healey's 5–2 set win over Justin Gimelstob in men's singles tied the score at 21 all and sent the match to a super tiebreaker, which Healey won, 7–4, to improve the Buzz's record to 4 wins and 1 loss.

Two nights later, the Buzz visited Washington for a rematch. The Buzz won three of the first four sets to build an 18–13 lead. But Robby Ginepri won the final set of men's singles, 5–3, over Healey and then won three straight games in overtime to send the match to a super tiebreaker. Ginepri completed the furious comeback by taking the super tiebreaker game, 7–4, to give the Kastles the win and drop the Buzz's record to 4 wins and 2 losses.

The Buzz went on the road on July 15, to face the 7–0 Kansas City Explorers, the only undefeated team remaining in WTT. With the match tied at 13 all after three sets, Navrátilová and Shvedova dominated Rennae Stubbs and Květa Peschke, 5–0, in women's doubles. Briaud and Healey closed out a 23–17 victory by taking a tiebreaker in the final set of men's doubles. The win improved the Buzz's record to 6 wins and 3 losses.

On July 18, the Buzz hosted the defending WTT Champion Sacramento Capitals in a rematch of the 2007 WTT Finals. Shvedova won the fourth set of women's singles, 5–2, and teamed with Navrátilová to win the opening set of women's doubles in a tiebreaker and with Healey to win the second set of mixed doubles, 5–3. Leading 18–14 after four sets, Briaud and Healey dropped the fifth set of men's doubles in a tiebreaker, but they won the second game of overtime to secure a 23–20 victory for the Buzz that improved its record to 7 wins and 3 losses.

Coming off a road loss to the Philadelphia Freedoms that included an appearance by coach Jay Udwadia playing the tiebreaker game of the men's singles set, the Buzz hosted the first-place Sportimes on July 20. The Sportimes could clinch the Eastern Conference championship with a win. Shvedova won the fourth set of women's singles, 5–1, and paired with Navrátilová for a 5–0 set win in women's doubles in the opening set and with Healey to take the second set of mixed doubles, 5–3. Briaud and Healey closed out a dominant 23–11 victory with a 5–2 set win in men's doubles. The win clinched the second consecutive playoff appearance for the Buzz and improved its record to 8 wins and 4 losses.

After the win over the Sportimes, the Buzz closed the regular season by winning all five sets in each of its final two matches to finish with 10 wins and 4 losses and a three-match winning streak.

=== Eastern Conference title ===
Under the 2008 playoff format, the WTT conference championships were decided in the regular season. After the Buzz completed its regular season on July 23, it trailed the New York Sportimes by one-half match in the Eastern Conference but held a standings tiebreaker edge based on games won in head-to-head matches, 43–33. Later that evening, the Sportimes lost on the road to the Sacramento Capitals, 20–19, when Eric Butorac and Sam Warburg took a fifth-set tiebreaker from Brian Wilson and Jesse Witten, giving the Buzz its second consecutive Eastern Conference championship.

=== Shvedova named Rookie of the Year ===
Yaroslava Shvedova was named WTT Female Rookie of the Year. She was second in the league in winning percentage in women's singles and fourth in women's doubles.

=== Battle for New York in WTT Semifinals ===
The Buzz was the overall number 2 seed which matched it with the number 3 seed, the New York Sportimes, in the WTT Semifinals on July 26, at Allstate Stadium at Westfield Galleria at Roseville in Roseville, California, the site of WTT's 2008 Championship Weekend. In the first ever postseason meeting between the two New York clubs, the Buzz dominated the match winning the first four sets. Nathan Healey and Yaroslava Shvedova opened the match with a 5–3 set win against John McEnroe and Hana Šromová in mixed doubles. Shvedova followed with a 5–2 women's singles win over Ashley Harkleroad. Healy took care of Jesse Witten, 5–2, in men's singles. Gabriela Navrátilová and Shvedova needed a tiebreaker to beat Harkleroad and Šromová, 5–4, and give the Buzz a 20–11 lead heading to the final set. McEnroe and Witten won a tiebreaker over Patrick Briaud and Healy in men's doubles to force overtime with the Buzz leading 24–16. Briaud and Healy won the second game of overtime to give the Buzz a 25–17 victory and send it to its fourth WTT Final.

=== WTT Final ===
On July 27, in the WTT Final, the Buzz faced the number 1 seed Kansas City Explorers, who were coming off a regular season record of 13 wins and 1 loss (coming at the hands of the Buzz on July 15) and thrashed the defending champion Sacramento Capitals 21–10 in the semifinals. Nathan Healey got the Buzz off to a good start with a win in the first set of men's singles over Dušan Vemić, 5–3. Yaroslava Shvedova followed with a 5–3 set win over Květa Peschke in women's singles to give the Buzz a 10–6 lead. The Explorers fought back with a 5–3 set win by Rennae Stubbs and Vemić in mixed doubles over Shvedova and Healey. Stubbs and Peschke then registered a 5–3 set win over Shvedova and Gabriela Navrátilová in women's doubles to tie the match at 16 all. In the final set, Healey and Patrick Briaud topped James Auckland and Vemić in men's doubles, 5–2, to secure the first King Trophy in Buzz history. Despite playing for the losing team, Stubbs was named WTT Championship Most Valuable Player.

== Event chronology ==
- April 1, 2008: The Buzz protected Gabriela Navrátilová and selected Yaroslava Shvedova, Nathan Healey and Vladimir Obradović at the WTT Roster Player Draft. The Buzz left Rik de Voest, Ashley Fisher and Gréta Arn unprotected. Jay Udwadia was named the team's head coach.
- May 8, 2008: The Buzz announced that it would move its home matches to the Washington Avenue Armory Sports and Convention Arena in Albany, New York.
- July 1, 2008: The Buzz signed Patrick Briaud as a roster player.
- July 20, 2008: With a record of 8 wins and 4 losses, the Buzz clinched a berth in the WTT playoffs for the second consecutive season with a 23–11 home victory against the New York Sportimes.
- July 23, 2008: With a record of 10 wins and 4 losses, the Buzz clinched the Eastern Conference championship, when the Sacramento Capitals defeated the New York Sportimes, 20–19.
- July 26, 2008: The Buzz defeated the New York Sportimes, 25–17, in the WTT Semifinals to reach the WTT Final for the second consecutive season.
- July 27, 2008: The Buzz won the King Trophy as WTT champions, when it defeated the Kansas City Explorers, 21–18, in the WTT Final. It is the first WTT championship for the franchise.

== Draft picks ==
Since the Buzz lost in the 2007 WTT Finals, it had the next-to-last (10th) selection in each round of WTT's two drafts. The Buzz passed on making any selections in the Marquee Player Draft. The league conducted its 2008 Roster Player Draft on April 1, in Miami, Florida. The selections made by the Buzz are shown in the table below.

| Round | No. | Overall | Player chosen | Prot? |
|---|---|---|---|---|
| 1 | 10 | 10 | (Russia) Yaroslava Shvedova | N |
| 2 | 10 | 21 | (Australia) Nathan Healey | N |
| 3 | 10 | 32 | (Czech Republic) Gabriela Navrátilová | Y |
| 4 | 10 | 43 | (Serbia) Vladimir Obradović | N |

The Buzz did not select any roster-exempt players.

== Match log ==
=== Regular season ===
Legend
| Buzz Win | Buzz Loss |
Home team in CAPS

| Match | Date | Venue and location | Result and details | Record |
|---|---|---|---|---|
| 1 | July 3 | DuPont Country Club; Brandywine Hundred, Delaware | New York Buzz 24, DELAWARE SMASH 16 * WD: Gabriela Navrátilová/Yaroslava Shvedova (Buzz) 5, Madison Brengle/Christina Fusano (Smash) 2 * WS: Madison Brengle (Smash) 5, Yaroslava Shvedova (Buzz) 4 * MD: Patrick Briaud/Nathan Healey (Buzz) 5, Ryler DeHeart/Chris Haggard (Smash) 4 * MS: Nathan Healey (Buzz) 5, Ryler DeHeart (Smash) 2 * XD: Gabriela Navrátilová/Nathan Healey (Buzz) 5, Christina Fusano/Chris Haggard (Smash) 3 | 1–0 |
| 2 | July 5 | Dwight Davis Memorial Tennis Center; St. Louis, Missouri | New York Buzz 23, ST. LOUIS ACES 18 * XD: Travis Rettenmaier/Jasmin Wöhr (Aces) 5, Nathan Healey/Yaroslava Shvedova (Buzz) 4 * WD: Gabriela Navrátilová/Yaroslava Shvedova (Buzz) 5, Jelena Pandžić/Jasmin Wöhr (Aces) 2 * MS: Uladzimir Ignatik (Aces) 5, Nathan Healey (Buzz) 4 * WS: Yaroslava Shvedova (Buzz) 5, Jelena Pandžić (Aces) 2 * MD: Patrick Briaud/Nathan Healey (Buzz) 5, Travis Rettenmaier/Uladzimir Ignatik (Aces) 4 | 2–0 |
| 3 | July 6 | Washington Avenue Armory Sports and Convention Arena; Albany, New York | NEW YORK BUZZ 23, Boston Lobsters 16 * WD: Gabriela Navrátilová/Yaroslava Shvedova (Buzz) 5, Raquel Kops-Jones/Marie-Ève Pelletier (Lobsters) 4 * XD: Nathan Healey/Yaroslava Shvedova (Buzz) 5, Jan-Michael Gambill/Marie-Ève Pelletier (Lobsters) 2 * MS: Amir Hadad (Lobsters) 5, Nathan Healey (Buzz) 3 * MD: Patrick Briaud/Nathan Healey (Buzz) 5, Jan-Michael Gambill/Amir Hadad (Lobsters) 3 * WS: Yaroslava Shvedova (Buzz) 5, Raquel Kops-Jones (Lobsters) 2 | 3–0 |
| 4 | July 8 | Sportime Stadium at Harbor Island; Mamaroneck, New York | NEW YORK SPORTIMES 22, New York Buzz 20 (overtime) * MD: Brian Wilson/Jesse Witten (Sportimes) 5, Patrick Briaud/Nathan Healey (Buzz) 3 * WD: Bethanie Mattek/Hana Šromová (Sportimes) 5, Gabriela Navrátilová/Yaroslava Shvedova (Buzz) 4 * XD: Bethanie Mattek/Brian Wilson (Sportimes) 5, Yaroslava Shvedova/Nathan Healey (Buzz) 3 * WS: Yaroslava Shvedova (Buzz) 5, Bethanie Mattek (Sportimes) 3 * MS: Nathan Healey (Buzz) 5, Jesse Witten (Sportimes) 3 * OT - MS: Jesse Witten (Sportimes) 1, Nathan Healey (Buzz) 0 | 3–1 |
| 5 | July 9 | Washington Avenue Armory Sports and Convention Arena; Albany, New York | NEW YORK BUZZ 22, Washington Kastles 21 (super tiebreaker, 7–4) * MD: Justin Gimelstob/Scott Oudsema (Kastles) 5, Patrick Briaud/Nathan Healey (Buzz) 3 * WD: Serena Williams/Mashona Washington (Kastles) 5, Gabriela Navrátilová/Yaroslava Shvedova (Buzz) 4 * WS: Serena Williams (Kastles) 5, Yaroslava Shvedova (Buzz) 4 * XD: Yaroslava Shvedova/Nathan Healey (Buzz) 5, Serena Williams/Justin Gimelstob (Kastles) 4 * MS: Nathan Healey (Buzz) 5, Justin Gimelstob (Kastles) 2 * STB - MS: Nathan Healey (Buzz) 7, Justin Gimelstob (Kastles) 4 | 4–1 |
| 6 | July 11 | Kastles Stadium at CityCenterDC; Washington, District of Columbia | WASHINGTON KASTLES 22, New York Buzz 21 (super tiebreaker, 7–4) * XD: Yaroslava Shvedova/Nathan Healey (Buzz) 5, Mashona Washington/Scott Oudsema (Kastles) 3 * WD: Sacha Jones/Mashona Washington (Kastles) 5, Gabriela Navrátilová/Yaroslava Shvedova (Buzz) 3 * MD: Patrick Briaud/Nathan Healey (Buzz) 5, Robby Ginepri/Scott Oudsema (Kastles) 4 * WS: Yaroslava Shvedova (Buzz) 5, Mashona Washington (Kastles) 1 * MS: Robby Ginepri (Kastles) 5, Nathan Healey (Buzz) 3 * OT - MS: Robby Ginepri (Kastles) 3, Nathan Healey (Buzz) 0 * STB - MS: Robby Ginepri (Kastles) 7, Nathan Healey (Buzz) 4 | 4–2 |
| 7 | July 12 | Ferncroft Country Club; Middleton, Massachusetts | New York Buzz 20, BOSTON LOBSTERS 19 (super tiebreaker, 7–4) * WS: Yaroslava Shvedova (Buzz) 5, Marie-Ève Pelletier (Lobsters) 2 * WD: Gabriela Navrátilová/Yaroslava Shvedova (Buzz) 5, Raquel Kops-Jones/Marie-Ève Pelletier (Lobsters) 3 * XD: Yaroslava Shvedova/Nathan Healey (Buzz) 5, Raquel Kops-Jones/Amir Hadad (Lobsters) 4 * MS: Jan-Michael Gambill (Lobsters) 5, Nathan Healey (Buzz) 0 * MD: Amir Hadad/Jan-Michael Gambill (Lobsters) 5, Patrick Briaud/Nathan Healey (Buzz) 4 * STB - MD: Patrick Briaud/Nathan Healey (Buzz) 7, Amir Hadad/Jan-Michael Gambill (Lobsters) 4 | 5–2 |
| 8 | July 13 | Washington Avenue Armory Sports and Convention Arena; Albany, New York | Philadelphia Freedoms 22, NEW YORK BUZZ 18 (overtime) * XD: Lisa Raymond/Travis Parrott (Freedoms) 5, Yaroslava Shvedova/Nathan Healey (Buzz) 3 * MS: Nathan Healey (Buzz) 5, Alex Bogomolov Jr. (Freedoms) 4 * WD: Lisa Raymond/Audra Cohen (Freedoms) 5, Gabriela Navrátilová/Yaroslava Shvedova (Buzz) 3 * WS: Audra Cohen (Freedoms) 5, Yaroslava Shvedova (Buzz) 2 * MD: Patrick Briaud/Nathan Healey (Buzz) 5, Alex Bogomolov Jr./Travis Parrott (Freedoms) 2 * OT - MD: Alex Bogomolov Jr./Travis Parrott (Freedoms) 1, Patrick Briaud/Nathan Healey (Buzz) 0 | 5–3 |
| 9 | July 15 | Barney Allis Plaza; Kansas City, Missouri | New York Buzz 23, KANSAS CITY EXPLORERS 17 * XD: Rennae Stubbs/Dušan Vemić (Explorers) 5, Yaroslava Shvedova/Nathan Healey (Buzz) 4 * WS: Yaroslava Shvedova (Buzz) 5, Květa Peschke (Explorers) 3 * MS: Dušan Vemić (Explorers) 5, Nathan Healey (Buzz) 4 * WD: Gabriela Navrátilová/Yaroslava Shvedova (Buzz) 5, Rennae Stubbs/Květa Peschke (Explorers) 0 * MD: Patrick Briaud/Nathan Healey (Buzz) 5, Dušan Vemić/James Auckland (Explorers) 4 | 6–3 |
| 10 | July 18 | Washington Avenue Armory Sports and Convention Arena; Albany, New York | NEW YORK BUZZ 23, Sacramento Capitals 20 (overtime) * WD: Gabriela Navrátilová/Yaroslava Shvedova (Buzz) 5, Elena Likhovtseva/Tammy Hendler (Capitals) 4 * XD: Yaroslava Shvedova/Nathan Healey (Buzz) 5, Elena Likhovtseva/Eric Butorac (Capitals) 3 * MS: Sam Warburg (Capitals) 5, Nathan Healey (Buzz) 3 * WS: Yaroslava Shvedova (Buzz) 5, Tammy Hendler (Capitals) 2 * MD: Eric Butorac/Sam Warburg (Capitals) 5, Patrick Briaud/Nathan Healey (Buzz) 4 * OT - MD: Patrick Briaud/Nathan Healey (Buzz) 1, Eric Butorac/Sam Warburg (Capitals) 1 | 7–3 |
| 11 | July 19 | King of Prussia Mall; Upper Merion Township, Pennsylvania | PHILADELPHIA FREEDOMS 25, New York Buzz 15 * MD: Alex Bogomolov Jr./Travis Parrott (Freedoms) 5, Nathan Healey/Patrick Briaud (Buzz) 2 * WS: Audra Cohen (Freedoms) 5, Yaroslava Shvedova (Buzz) 3 * XD: Lisa Raymond/Travis Parrott (Freedoms) 5, Yaroslava Shvedova/Nathan Healey (Buzz) 2 * WD: Lisa Raymond/Audra Cohen (Freedoms) 5, Gabriela Navrátilová/Yaroslava Shvedova (Buzz) 4 * MS: Alex Bogomolov Jr. (Freedoms) 5, Jay Udwadia (Buzz) 4 *** Jay Udwadia substituted for Nathan Healey at 4–4 | 7–4 |
| 12 | July 20 | Washington Avenue Armory Sports and Convention Arena; Albany, New York | NEW YORK BUZZ 23, New York Sportimes 11 * WD: Gabriela Navrátilová/Yaroslava Shvedova (Buzz) 5, Milagros Sequera/Hana Šromová (Sportimes) 0 * XD: Yaroslava Shvedova/Nathan Healey (Buzz) 5, Milagros Sequera/Brian Wilson (Sportimes) 3 * MS: Jesse Witten (Sportimes) 5, Nathan Healey (Buzz) 3 * WS: Yaroslava Shvedova (Buzz) 5, Hana Šromová (Sportimes) 1 *** Hana Šromová substituted for Milagros Sequera at 0–1 * MD: Patrick Briaud/Nathan Healey (Buzz) 5, Brian Wilson/Jesse Witten (Sportimes) 2 | 8–4 |
| 13 | July 22 | Washington Avenue Armory Sports and Convention Arena; Albany, New York | NEW YORK BUZZ 25, St. Louis Aces 13 * WD: Gabriela Navrátilová/Yaroslava Shvedova (Buzz) 5, Anna Kournikova/Jasmin Wöhr (Aces) 2 * XD: Yaroslava Shvedova/Nathan Healey (Buzz) 5, Anna Kournikova/Travis Rettenmaier (Aces) 2 * MS: Nathan Healey (Buzz) 5, Uladzimir Ignatik (Aces) 4 * WS: Yaroslava Shvedova (Buzz) 5, Jelena Pandžić (Aces) 3 * MD: Patrick Briaud/Nathan Healey (Buzz) 5, Travis Rettenmaier/Uladzimir Ignatik (Aces) 2 | 9–4 |
| 14 | July 23 | Washington Avenue Armory Sports and Convention Arena; Albany, New York | NEW YORK BUZZ 25, Delaware Smash 9 * WD: Gabriela Navrátilová/Yaroslava Shvedova (Buzz) 5, Madison Brengle/Christina Fusano (Smash) 0 * WS: Yaroslava Shvedova (Buzz) 5, Madison Brengle (Smash) 4 * MS: Nathan Healey (Buzz) 5, Josh Cohen (Smash) 2 * XD: Gabriela Navrátilová/Patrick Briaud (Buzz) 5, Christina Fusano/Josh Cohen (Smash) 3 *** Gabriela Navrátilová substituted for Yaroslava Shvedova at 2–2 *** Patrick Briaud substituted for Nathan Healey at 3–3 *** Josh Cohen substituted for Chris Haggard at 3–4 * MD: Patrick Briaud/Nathan Healey (Buzz) 5, Josh Cohen/Chris Haggard (Smash) 0 | 10–4 |

=== Playoffs ===
Legend
| Buzz Win | Buzz Loss |
Home team in CAPS

World TeamTennis Semifinals

| Date | Venue and location | Result and details |
|---|---|---|
| July 26 | Allstate Stadium at Westfield Galleria at Roseville; Roseville, California | NEW YORK BUZZ 25, New York Sportimes 17 (overtime) * XD: Yaroslava Shvedova/Nathan Healey (Buzz) 5, Hana Šromová/John McEnroe (Sportimes) 3 * WS: Yaroslava Shvedova (Buzz) 5, Ashley Harkleroad (Sportimes) 2 * MS: Nathan Healey (Buzz) 5, Jesse Witten (Sportimes) 2 * WD: Gabriela Navrátilová/Yaroslava Shvedova (Buzz) 5, Ashley Harkleroad/Hana Šromová (Sportimes) 4 * MD: John McEnroe/Jesse Witten (Sportimes) 5, Patrick Briaud/Nathan Healey (Buzz) 4 * OT - MD: Patrick Briaud/Nathan Healey (Buzz) 1, John McEnroe/Jesse Witten (Sportimes) 1 |

World TeamTennis Final

| Date | Venue and location | Result and details |
|---|---|---|
| July 27 | Allstate Stadium at Westfield Galleria at Roseville; Roseville, California | New York Buzz 21, KANSAS CITY EXPLORERS 18 * MS: Nathan Healey (Buzz) 5, Dušan Vemić (Explorers) 3 * WS: Yaroslava Shvedova (Buzz) 5, Květa Peschke (Explorers) 3 * XD: Rennae Stubbs/Dušan Vemić (Explorers) 5, Yaroslava Shvedova/Nathan Healey (Buzz) 3 * WD: Rennae Stubbs/Květa Peschke (Explorers) 5, Gabriela Navrátilová/Yaroslava Shvedova (Buzz) 3 * MD: Patrick Briaud/Nathan Healey (Buzz) 5, Dušan Vemić/James Auckland (Explorers) 2 |

== Team personnel ==
=== Players and coaches ===
- (United States) Jay Udwadia, Player-Coach
- (United States) Patrick Briaud
- (Australia) Nathan Healey
- (Czech Republic) Gabriela Navrátilová
- (Serbia) Vladimir Obradović (Note: Injured, did not play.)
- (Russia) Yaroslava Shvedova

=== Front office ===
- Nitty Singh, Owner, President and General Manager

== Statistics ==
Players are listed in order of their game-winning percentage provided they played in at least 40% of the Buzz's games in that event, which is the WTT minimum for qualification for league leaders in individual statistical categories.

Men's singles - regular season

| Player | GP | GW | GL | PCT |
|---|---|---|---|---|
| Nathan Healey | 116 | 55 | 61 | .474 |
| Jay Udwadia | 1 | 0 | 1 | .000 |
| Total | 117 | 55 | 62 | .470 |

Women's singles - regular season

| Player | GP | GW | GL | PCT |
|---|---|---|---|---|
| Yaroslava Shvedova | 106 | 63 | 43 | .594 |
| Total | 106 | 63 | 43 | .594 |

Men's doubles - regular season

| Player | GP | GW | GL | PCT |
|---|---|---|---|---|
| Patrick Briaud | 115 | 63 | 52 | .548 |
| Nathan Healey | 115 | 63 | 52 | .548 |
| Total | 115 | 63 | 52 | .548 |

Women's doubles - regular season

| Player | GP | GW | GL | PCT |
|---|---|---|---|---|
| Gabriela Navrátilová | 105 | 63 | 42 | .600 |
| Yaroslava Shvedova | 105 | 63 | 42 | .600 |
| Total | 105 | 63 | 42 | .600 |

Mixed doubles - regular season

| Player | GP | GW | GL | PCT |
|---|---|---|---|---|
| Nathan Healey | 111 | 59 | 52 | .532 |
| Yaroslava Shvedova | 101 | 53 | 48 | .525 |
| Patrick Briaud | 2 | 2 | 0 | 1.000 |
| Gabriela Navrátilová | 12 | 8 | 4 | .667 |
| Total | 113 | 61 | 52 | .540 |

Team totals - regular season

| Event | GP | GW | GL | PCT |
|---|---|---|---|---|
| Men's singles | 117 | 55 | 62 | .470 |
| Women's singles | 106 | 63 | 43 | .594 |
| Men's doubles | 115 | 63 | 52 | .548 |
| Women's doubles | 105 | 63 | 42 | .600 |
| Mixed doubles | 113 | 61 | 52 | .540 |
| Total | 556 | 305 | 251 | .549 |

Men's singles - playoffs

| Player | GP | GW | GL | PCT |
|---|---|---|---|---|
| Nathan Healey | 15 | 10 | 5 | .667 |
| Total | 15 | 10 | 5 | .667 |

Women's singles - playoffs

| Player | GP | GW | GL | PCT |
|---|---|---|---|---|
| Yaroslava Shvedova | 15 | 10 | 5 | .667 |
| Total | 15 | 10 | 5 | .667 |

Men's doubles - playoffs

| Player | GP | GW | GL | PCT |
|---|---|---|---|---|
| Patrick Briaud | 18 | 10 | 8 | .556 |
| Nathan Healey | 18 | 10 | 8 | .556 |
| Total | 18 | 10 | 8 | .556 |

Women's doubles - playoffs

| Player | GP | GW | GL | PCT |
|---|---|---|---|---|
| Gabriela Navrátilová | 17 | 8 | 9 | .471 |
| Yaroslava Shvedova | 17 | 8 | 9 | .471 |
| Total | 17 | 8 | 9 | .471 |

Mixed doubles - playoffs

| Player | GP | GW | GL | PCT |
|---|---|---|---|---|
| Nathan Healey | 16 | 8 | 8 | .500 |
| Yaroslava Shvedova | 16 | 8 | 8 | .500 |
| Total | 16 | 8 | 8 | .500 |

Team totals - playoffs

| Event | GP | GW | GL | PCT |
|---|---|---|---|---|
| Men's singles | 15 | 10 | 5 | .667 |
| Women's singles | 15 | 10 | 5 | .667 |
| Men's doubles | 18 | 10 | 8 | .556 |
| Women's doubles | 17 | 8 | 9 | .471 |
| Mixed doubles | 16 | 8 | 8 | .500 |
| Total | 81 | 46 | 35 | .568 |

Men's singles - all matches

| Player | GP | GW | GL | PCT |
|---|---|---|---|---|
| Nathan Healey | 131 | 65 | 66 | .496 |
| Jay Udwadia | 1 | 0 | 1 | .000 |
| Total | 132 | 65 | 67 | .492 |

Women's singles - all matches

| Player | GP | GW | GL | PCT |
|---|---|---|---|---|
| Yaroslava Shvedova | 121 | 73 | 48 | .603 |
| Total | 121 | 73 | 48 | .603 |

Men's doubles - all matches

| Player | GP | GW | GL | PCT |
|---|---|---|---|---|
| Patrick Briaud | 133 | 73 | 60 | .549 |
| Nathan Healey | 133 | 73 | 60 | .549 |
| Total | 133 | 73 | 60 | .549 |

Women's doubles - all matches

| Player | GP | GW | GL | PCT |
|---|---|---|---|---|
| Gabriela Navrátilová | 122 | 71 | 51 | .582 |
| Yaroslava Shvedova | 122 | 71 | 51 | .582 |
| Total | 122 | 71 | 51 | .582 |

Mixed doubles - all matches

| Player | GP | GW | GL | PCT |
|---|---|---|---|---|
| Nathan Healey | 127 | 67 | 60 | .528 |
| Yaroslava Shvedova | 117 | 61 | 56 | .521 |
| Patrick Briaud | 2 | 2 | 0 | 1.000 |
| Gabriela Navrátilová | 12 | 8 | 4 | .667 |
| Total | 129 | 69 | 60 | .535 |

Team totals - all matches

| Event | GP | GW | GL | PCT |
|---|---|---|---|---|
| Men's singles | 132 | 65 | 67 | .492 |
| Women's singles | 121 | 73 | 48 | .603 |
| Men's doubles | 133 | 73 | 60 | .549 |
| Women's doubles | 122 | 71 | 51 | .582 |
| Mixed doubles | 129 | 69 | 60 | .535 |
| Total | 637 | 351 | 286 | .551 |

== Transactions ==
- April 1, 2008: The Buzz protected Gabriela Navrátilová and selected Yaroslava Shvedova, Nathan Healey and Vladimir Obradović at the WTT Roster Player Draft. The Buzz left Rik de Voest, Ashley Fisher and Gréta Arn unprotected. Jay Udwadia was named the team's head coach.
- July 1, 2008: The Buzz signed Patrick Briaud as a roster player.

== Individual honors and achievements ==
Yaroslava Shvedova was named WTT Female Rookie of the Year. She was second in the league in winning percentage in women's singles and fourth in women's doubles.

== See also ==
- Sports in New York's Capital District
- Athletics in upstate New York
- Sports in New York
