= 2008 Washington Kastles season =

American tennis team season

- Conference: 5th Eastern

Record
- 2008 record: 6 wins, 8 losses
- Home record: 3 wins, 4 losses
- Road record: 3 wins, 4 losses
- Games won–lost: 261–284

Team info
- Owner(s): Mark Ein
- Coach: Thomas Blake
- Stadium: Kastles Stadium at CityCenterDC (capacity: 2,020)

The 2008 Washington Kastles season was the inaugural season of the franchise in World TeamTennis (WTT). The Kastles finished fifth in WTT's Eastern Conference with 6 wins and 8 losses and failed to qualify for the postseason.

== Season recap ==
=== Founding of franchise ===
The founding of the Washington Kastles as an expansion franchise was announced by WTT CEO/commissioner Ilana Kloss on February 14, 2008. The team was founded by a group led by venture capitalist and entrepreneur Mark Ein, a resident of the Washington metropolitan area. At the press conference announcing the team's creation, Ein said, "I am thrilled to bring World TeamTennis to our area. WTT tennis is great entertainment emphasizing fan interaction, and it is the only major sport with men and women playing together on the same team. The Washington Kastles season will be an exciting summertime addition to our local economy and a fun activity for our entire community." The team was named after Kastle Systems, LLC, a provider of building and office security systems, of which Ein was the majority owner and managing member. The Kastles became the first franchise in WTT history to be based in Washington.

=== Drafts ===
Serena Williams became the first player in history to sign with the Kastles, when she was selected by the team in the first round of the WTT Marquee Player Draft on March 19, 2008.

In the Roster Player Draft on April 1, 2008, the Kastles selected Justin Gimelstob, Sacha Jones, Scott Oudsema and Mashona Washington.

=== Kastles get a home ===
At a press conference on April 30, 2008, that included Kastles owner Mark Ein, WTT CEO/commissioner Ilana Kloss, WTT co-founder Billie Jean King and Washington mayor Adrian Fenty, the Kastles announced plans for the construction of a temporary 2,020-seat stadium on the parking lot on which CityCenterDC was expected to be built in the future. The Washington Convention Center had formerly stood on the site. The temporary stadium was to feature both courtside premium box seating and affordable bleachers close to the action. Located at 11th and H Streets, the stadium could be reached by fans using the Washington Metro. After extolling the virtues of the stadium and its location, Ein said, "We’re going to take this parking lot and turn it into a home worth defending."

The team announced that season tickets as well as three-match packages that included the inaugural home match in which Serena Williams was scheduled to appear and visits by John McEnroe and the New York Sportimes and by Anna Kournikova and the St. Louis Aces were on sale. Ein said that the Kastles were committed to integrating charitable and community-based initiatives into all of their activities. There would be a designated charity beneficiary for each home match, and the Kastles planned to host community-based programs at the stadium. The team expected to provide internship and volunteer opportunities for area youth. The Kastles planned to give away more than 1,000 tennis racquets to local children attending their matches and at community clinics sponsored by the team.

=== Gimelstob suspension ===
Justin Gimelstob appeared on The Junkies, a local radio sports and lifestyle talk show, in June 2008. During an hour-long interview, Gimelstob made several disparaging comments about female tennis players. He said, "Female tennis players lack the social skills. They don’t go to high school; they don’t go to parties." Gimelstob used the term "sexpot" to describe both Tatiana Golovin and Alizé Cornet. He commented that there were fewer lesbians on the women's tour than there had been 15 years earlier "because they're all Russian chicks, and there are some cute ones out there." Regarding Anna Kournikova of the St. Louis Aces, alongside whom he once trained, Gimelstob said, "She's a bitch. Hate's a very strong word. I just despise her to the maximum level just below hate." Looking ahead to his upcoming meeting on the court with Kournikova in mixed doubles, Gimelstob said that he wanted to hit her hard in the midriff when serving in her direction. He added, "If she’s not crying by the time she walks off the court, then I did not do my job." Asked by the hosts if he would ever date Kournikova, Gimelstob responded, "Definitely not. I have no attraction to her. She has a great body but her face is a five. I really have no interest in her ... I wouldn’t mind having my younger brother, who’s a kind of a stud, nail her and then reap the benefits of that."

Following Gimelstob's comments, on June 25, 2008, WTT suspended him for one match without pay for violating the league's player code of conduct. In a statement released by the league, Gimelstob apologized and said that there was no excuse for his comments. He expressed "heartfelt remorse" and said that his comments did not represent who he is and the respect he has for women. Gimelstob said that he would be making a donation to the Women's Sports Foundation with the hope that positive action can speak louder than his words.

On July 3, 2008, the Kastles signed Vince Spadea as a substitute player to replace Gimelstob in their inaugural match.

=== Season-opening road trip ===
The Kastles met the Philadelphia Freedoms in their inaugural match on July 4, 2008, at the King of Prussia Mall in Upper Merion Township, Pennsylvania. Vince Spadea was the first player on the court for the Kastles, and he won the opening set of men's singles, 5–3. Mashona Washington followed with a 5–3 set win in women's singles. After Spadea teamed with Scott Oudsema to take the third set of men's doubles, the Kastles had a 15–9 lead. The Freedoms won the fourth set of women's doubles in a tiebreaker and followed by taking the final set of mixed doubles, 5–3, to send the match to overtime with the Kastles leading, 22–19. Washington and Oudsema won the first game of overtime to seal the Kastles' victory.

The following day, the Kastles signed Tripp Phillips as a substitute player to fill in for Justin Gimelstob for their match in Delaware that evening. Gimelstob was unavailable, because he was working as a television analyst at Wimbledon. Washington and Oudsema carried the Kastles to their second straight win to start the season. They opened the match with a 5–2 set win in mixed doubles. Oudsema teamed with Phillips in the third set of men's doubles for a 5–3 set win. Washington paired with Sacha Jones to take the fourth set of women's doubles in a tiebreaker that gave the Kastles an 18–14 lead. After Oudsema dropped the final set of men's singles to cut the Kastles' lead to 20–19, he won the first game of overtime to clinch a 21–19 triumph over the Delaware Smash.

=== Home opener ===
The Kastles inaugural match at home was the climax of an all-day event. The team conducted a youth tennis clinic at Kastles Stadium, and Serena Williams, fresh off a loss in the Wimbledon Ladies' Final to her sister, Venus, and a transatlantic flight arrived about an hour late. She participated in the clinic for 19 minutes, giving advice about both tennis and life and hitting volleys with some of the 50 children present. After an interview with the Tennis Channel, Williams held a press conference for the 20 reporters on hand, who quizzed her about the loss to her sister. Later in the day, Williams stopped by the Kastles VIP tent to speak with the guests.

Kastles owner Mark Ein joined the sellout crowd, taking his courtside seat, flanked by Washington mayor Adrian Fenty and WTT co-founder Billie Jean King, prepared to watch his undefeated team. However, when the players hit the court, the visiting Boston Lobsters quickly erased the festive mood. In the opening set of men's doubles, Amir Hadad and Jan-Michael Gambill thumped Scott Oudsema and Justin Gimelstob, who was making his season debut, 5–1. Williams and Gimelstob followed by dropping the second set of mixed doubles, 5–2. After Gimelstob lost the third set of men's singles in a tiebreaker, the Lobsters had a 15–7 lead. Williams and Mashona Washington managed to take the fourth set of women's doubles in a tiebreaker to cut the lead to 19–12. Williams converted a break point in the sixth game and won the closing set of women's singles, 5–2, over Marie-Ève Pelletier to send the match to overtime with the Lobsters leading, 21–17. Williams won the first two overtime games, before Pelletier held serve in the third to secure a 22–19 victory for the Lobsters.

On the day of their home opener, the Kastles announced they had signed Robby Ginepri as a substitute player to fill in for Gimelstob on July 11, 2008.

=== First home victory sparks a winning streak ===
After their home debut, the Kastles embarked on a two-match New York road trip and lost to both the New York Buzz and the New York Sportimes. The Kastles returned home to face the Buzz on July 11, 2008, looking to secure their first home victory and break their three-match losing streak, having dropped all three matches in which Serena Williams appeared. After the Kastles dropped the opening set, Sacha Jones and Mashona Washington evened the match at 8 all with a 5–3 set win in women's doubles. The Buzz took the next two sets and held an 18–13 lead heading to the final set of men's singles. Robby Ginepri, making his Kastles debut, won the set, 5–3, over Nathan Healey to send the match to overtime. Ginepri then won three straight overtime games over Healey to tie the match at 21 all and force a super tiebreaker. Ginepri completed the dramatic comeback by taking the super tiebreaker, 7–4, to give the Kastles their first home victory in franchise history.

The following day, the Kastles announced they had signed Kevin Kim as a substitute player to replace Justin Gimelstob in their July 13 match at Newport Beach.

Williams and Kim were the key players in the Kastles' victory over the Newport Beach Breakers. They opened the match with a 5–2 set win in mixed doubles. After the Breakers took both the women's and men's doubles sets, they held a 12–8 lead. Williams dominated Lilia Osterloh, 5–0, in women's singles to put the Kastles in front, 13–12. Kim faced eventual 2008 WTT Male Most Valuable Player Ramón Delgado in the final set of men's singles. Delgado entered the match leading WTT in men's singles winning percentage having taken 31 of 47 games played and had not yet dropped a set in the event all season. Delgado went up a break in the set and pushed to a 4–1 lead while giving the Breakers a 16–14 lead in the match. Kim used strong baseline play to hold in the sixth game, break back in the seventh and hold in the eighth game. The set went to a tiebreaker with the Kastles leading, 17–16. Kim won the set tiebreaker, 5–2, to avoid the super tiebreaker and give the Kastles an 18–16 win.

== Event chronology ==
- February 14, 2008: WTT announced the founding of the Washington Kastles to begin play in the 2008 season.
- March 19, 2008: The Kastles selected Serena Williams at the WTT Marquee Player Draft.
- April 1, 2008: The Kastles selected Justin Gimelstob, Sacha Jones, Scott Oudsema and Mashona Washington at the WTT RosterPlayer Draft.
- April 30, 2008: The Kastles announced their home matches would be played in a temporary stadium to be erected on the proposed future site of CityCenterDC.
- June 25, 2008: Justin Gimelstob was suspended by WTT for one match without pay for violating the league's player code of conduct.
- July 3, 2008: The Kastles signed Vince Spadea as a substitute player.
- July 4, 2008: The Kastles defeated the Philadelphia Freedoms, 23–19 in overtime, in the inaugural match for the franchise.
- July 5, 2008: The Kastles signed Tripp Phillips as a substitute player.
- 'July 6, 2008: The Kastles lost the franchise's inaugural home match to the Boston Lobsters, 22–19 in overtime.
- July 6, 2008: The Kastles signed Robby Ginepri as a substitute player.
- July 11, 2008: The Kastles earned the first home win in franchise history, 22–21 in a super tiebreaker, over the New York Buzz.
- July 12, 2008: The Kastles signed Kevin Kim as a substitute player.

== Draft picks ==
With 11 teams making selections in WTT's two 2008 drafts, the Kastles, as an expansion team, were assigned the middle pick (sixth) in each round.

=== Marquee Player Draft ===
In the Marquee Player Draft on March 19, 2008, the Kastles selected Serena Williams in the first round. They did not make a second-round selection.

=== Roster Player Draft ===
The league conducted its 2008 Roster Player Draft on April 1, in Miami, Florida. The selections made by the Kastles are shown in the table below.

| Round | No. | Overall | Player chosen | Prot? |
|---|---|---|---|---|
| 1 | 6 | 6 | (United States) Justin Gimelstob | N |
| 2 | 6 | 17 | (New Zealand) Sacha Jones | N |
| 3 | 6 | 28 | (United States) Scott Oudsema | N |
| 4 | 6 | 39 | (United States) Mashona Washington | N |

The Kastles did not select any roster-exempt players.

== Match log ==
Legend
| Kastles Win | Kastles Loss |
Home team in CAPS

| Match | Date | Venue and location | Result and details | Record |
|---|---|---|---|---|
| 1 | July 4 | King of Prussia Mall; Upper Merion Township, Pennsylvania | Washington Kastles 23, PHILADELPHIA FREEDOMS 19 (overtime) * MS: Vince Spadea (Kastles) 5, Alex Bogomolov Jr. (Freedoms) 3 * WS: Mashona Washington (Kastles) 5, Audra Cohen (Freedoms) 3 * MD: Scott Oudsema/Vince Spadea (Kastles) 5, Alex Bogomolov Jr./Travis Parrott (Freedoms) 3 * WD: Audra Cohen/Carly Gullickson (Freedoms) 5, Mashona Washington/Sacha Jones (Kastles) 4 * XD: Carly Gullickson/Travis Parrott (Freedoms) 5, Mashona Washington/Scott Oudsema (Kastles) 3 * OT - XD: Mashona Washington/Scott Oudsema (Kastles) 1, Carly Gullickson/Travis Parrott (Freedoms) 0 | 1–0 |
| 2 | July 5 | DuPont Country Club; Brandywine Hundred, Delaware | Washington Kastles 21, DELAWARE SMASH 19 (overtime) * XD: Mashona Washington/Scott Oudsema (Kastles) 5, Christina Fusano/Chris Haggard (Smash) 2 *** Christina Fusano substituted for Madison Brengle at 1–3 * WS: Madison Brengle (Smash) 5, Mashona Washington (Kastles) 3 * MD: Scott Oudsema/Tripp Phillips (Kastles) 5, Chris Haggard/Ryler DeHeart (Smash) 3 * WD: Mashona Washington/Sacha Jones (Kastles) 5, Christina Fusano/Madison Brengle (Smash) 4 * MS: Ryler DeHeart (Smash) 5, Scott Oudsema (Kastles) 2 * OT - MS: Scott Oudsema (Kastles) 1, Ryler DeHeart (Smash) 0 | 2–0 |
| 3 | July 8 | Kastles Stadium at CityCenterDC; Washington, District of Columbia | Boston Lobsters 22, WASHINGTON KASTLES 19 (overtime) * MD: Amir Hadad/Jan-Michael Gambill (Lobsters) 5, Scott Oudsema/Justin Gimelstob (Kastles) 1 * XD: Raquel Kops-Jones/Amir Hadad (Lobsters) 5, Serena Williams/Justin Gimelstob (Kastles) 2 * MS: Jan-Michael Gambill (Lobsters) 5, Justin Gimelstob (Kastles) 4 * WD: Mashona Washington/Serena Williams (Kastles) 5, Raquel Kops-Jones/Marie-Ève Pelletier (Lobsters) 4 * WS: Serena Williams (Kastles) 5, Marie-Ève Pelletier (Lobsters) 2 * OT - WS: Serena Williams (Kastles) 2, Marie-Ève Pelletier (Lobsters) 1 | 2–1 |
| 4 | July 9 | Washington Avenue Armory Sports and Convention Arena; Albany, New York | NEW YORK BUZZ 22, Washington Kastles 21 (super tiebreaker, 7–4) * MD: Justin Gimelstob/Scott Oudsema (Kastles) 5, Patrick Briaud/Nathan Healey (Buzz) 3 * WD: Serena Williams/Mashona Washington (Kastles) 5, Gabriela Navrátilová/Yaroslava Shvedova (Buzz) 4 * WS: Serena Williams (Kastles) 5, Yaroslava Shvedova (Buzz) 4 * XD: Yaroslava Shvedova/Nathan Healey (Buzz) 5, Serena Williams/Justin Gimelstob (Kastles) 4 * MS: Nathan Healey (Buzz) 5, Justin Gimelstob (Kastles) 2 * STB - MS: Nathan Healey (Buzz) 7, Justin Gimelstob (Kastles) 4 | 2–2 |
| 5 | July 10 | Sportime Stadium at Harbor Island; Mamaroneck, New York | NEW YORK SPORTIMES 21, Washington Kastles 20 * MD: Brian Wilson/Jesse Witten (Sportimes) 5, Scott Oudsema/Justin Gimelstob (Kastles) 4 * WD: Mashona Washington/Serena Williams (Kastles) 5, Bethanie Mattek/Hana Šromová (Sportimes) 4 * XD: Serena Williams/Justin Gimelstob (Kastles) 5, Bethanie Mattek/Brian Wilson (Sportimes) 2 * WS: Bethanie Mattek (Sportimes) 5, Mashona Washington (Kastles) 2 *** Mashona Washington substituted for Serena Williams at 1–3 * MS: Jesse Witten (Sportimes) 5, Scott Oudsema (Kastles) 4 | 2–3 |
| 6 | July 11 | Kastles Stadium at CityCenterDC; Washington, District of Columbia | WASHINGTON KASTLES 22, New York Buzz 21 (super tiebreaker, 7–4) * XD: Yaroslava Shvedova/Nathan Healey (Buzz) 5, Mashona Washington/Scott Oudsema (Kastles) 3 * WD: Sacha Jones/Mashona Washington (Kastles) 5, Gabriela Navrátilová/Yaroslava Shvedova (Buzz) 3 * MD: Patrick Briaud/Nathan Healey (Buzz) 5, Robby Ginepri/Scott Oudsema (Kastles) 4 * WS: Yaroslava Shvedova (Buzz) 5, Mashona Washington (Kastles) 1 * MS: Robby Ginepri (Kastles) 5, Nathan Healey (Buzz) 3 * OT - MS: Robby Ginepri (Kastles) 3, Nathan Healey (Buzz) 0 * STB - MS: Robby Ginepri (Kastles) 7, Nathan Healey (Buzz) 4 | 3–3 |
| 7 | July 13 | Breakers Stadium at the Newport Beach Country Club; Newport Beach, California | Washington Kastles 18, NEWPORT BEACH BREAKERS 16 * XD: Serena Williams/Kevin Kim (Kastles) 5, Lilia Osterloh/Kaes Van't Hof (Breakers) 2 * WD: Lilia Osterloh/Michaela Paštiková (Breakers) 5, Mashona Washington/Serena Williams (Kastles) 3 * MD: Ramón Delgado/Kaes Van't Hof (Breakers) 5, Scott Oudsema/Kevin Kim (Kastles) 0 * WS: Serena Williams (Kastles) 5, Lilia Osterloh (Breakers) 0 * MS: Kevin Kim (Kastles) 5, Ramón Delgado (Breakers) 4 | 4–3 |
| 8 | July 15 | Kastles Stadium at CityCenterDC; Washington, District of Columbia | WASHINGTON KASTLES 18, New York Sportimes 17 (super tiebreaker, 7–5) * XD: Milagros Sequera/Brian Wilson (Sportimes) 5, Mashona Washington/Justin Gimelstob (Kastles) 1 * WS: Milagros Sequera (Sportimes) 5, Mashona Washington (Kastles) 1 * MS: Scott Oudsema (Kastles) 5, John McEnroe (Sportimes) 2 * MD: Scott Oudsema/Justin Gimelstob (Kastles) 5, Brian Wilson/John McEnroe (Sportimes) 4 * WD: Mashona Washington/Sacha Jones (Kastles) 5, Milagros Sequera/Hana Šromová (Sportimes) 1 * STB - WD: Mashona Washington/Sacha Jones (Kastles) 7, Milagros Sequera/Hana Šromová (Sportimes) 5 | 5–3 |
| 9 | July 17 | Kastles Stadium at CityCenterDC; Washington, District of Columbia | Sacramento Capitals 20, WASHINGTON KASTLES 15 * WS: Sacha Jones (Kastles) 5, Elena Likhovtseva (Capitals) 2 *** Elena Likhovtseva substituted for Tamaryn Hendler at 0–4 * XD: Mashona Washington/Scott Oudsema (Kastles) 5, Elena Likhovtseva/Eric Butorac (Capitals) 3 * MS: Sam Warburg (Capitals) 5, Scott Oudsema (Kastles) 3 * MD: Sam Warburg/Eric Butorac (Capitals) 5, Scott Oudsema/Justin Gimelstob (Kastles) 2 * WD: Elena Likhovtseva/Tamaryn Hendler (Capitals) 5, Mashona Washington/Sacha Jones (Kastles) 0 | 5–4 |
| 10 | July 18 | Ferncroft Country Club; Middleton, Massachusetts | BOSTON LOBSTERS 23, Washington Kastles 14 * MD: Amir Hadad/Jan-Michael Gambill (Lobsters) 5, Scott Oudsema/Justin Gimelstob (Kastles) 3 * XD: Raquel Kops-Jones/Amir Hadad (Lobsters) 5, Mashona Washington/Scott Oudsema (Kastles) 2 * MS: Jan-Michael Gambill (Lobsters) 5, Scott Oudsema (Kastles) 2 * WS: Marie-Ève Pelletier (Lobsters) 5, Sacha Jones (Kastles) 2 * WD: Mashona Washington/Sacha Jones (Kastles) 5, Raquel Kops-Jones/Marie-Ève Pelletier (Lobsters) 2 * OT - WD: Raquel Kops-Jones/Marie-Ève Pelletier (Lobsters) 1, Mashona Washington/Sacha Jones (Kastles) 0 | 5–5 |
| 11 | July 19 | Barney Allis Plaza; Kansas City, Missouri | KANSAS CITY EXPLORERS 24, Washington Kastles 13 * MS: Scott Oudsema (Kastles) 5, Dušan Vemić (Explorers) 4 * WS: Květa Peschke (Explorers) 5, Sacha Jones (Kastles) 4 * XD: Rennae Stubbs/Bob Bryan (Explorers) 5, Mashona Washington/Scott Oudsema (Kastles) 2 * WD: Rennae Stubbs/Květa Peschke (Explorers) 5, Mashona Washington/Sacha Jones (Kastles) 0 * MD: Bob Bryan/Mike Bryan (Explorers) 5, Scott Oudsema/Justin Gimelstob (Kastles) 2 | 5–6 |
| 12 | July 20 | Kastles Stadium at CityCenterDC; Washington, District of Columbia | Philadelphia Freedoms 23, WASHINGTON KASTLES 19 (overtime) * MS: Alex Bogomolov Jr. (Freedoms) 5, Scott Oudsema (Kastles) 3 * WD: Lisa Raymond/Audra Cohen (Freedoms) 5, Mashona Washington/Sacha Jones (Kastles) 4 * MD: Alex Bogomolov Jr./Travis Parrott (Freedoms) 5, Scott Oudsema/Justin Gimelstob (Kastles) 3 * XD: Lisa Raymond/Travis Parrott (Freedoms) 5, Mashona Washington/Justin Gimelstob (Kastles) 4 * WS: Sacha Jones (Kastles) 5, Audra Cohen (Freedoms) 2 * OT - WS: Audra Cohen (Freedoms) 1, Sacha Jones (Kastles) 0 | 5–7 |
| 13 | July 22 | Kastles Stadium at CityCenterDC; Washington, District of Columbia | Delaware Smash 20, WASHINGTON KASTLES 16 * MS: Scott Oudsema (Kastles) 5, Josh Cohen (Smash) 0 * WD: Madison Brengle/Christina Fusano (Smash) 5, Mashona Washington/Sacha Jones (Kastles) 1 * MD: Josh Cohen/Chris Haggard (Smash) 5, Scott Oudsema/Justin Gimelstob (Kastles) 4 * XD: Christina Fusano/Chris Haggard (Smash) 5, Mashona Washington/Scott Oudsema (Kastles) 4 * WS: Madison Brengle (Smash) 5, Sacha Jones (Kastles) 2 | 5–8 |
| 14 | July 23 | Kastles Stadium at CityCenterDC; Washington, District of Columbia | WASHINGTON KASTLES 22, St. Louis Aces 17 (overtime) * MS: Scott Oudsema (Kastles) 5, Travis Rettenmaier (Aces) 2 * WS: Jelena Pandžić (Aces) 5, Sacha Jones (Kastles) 3 * MD: Scott Oudsema/Justin Gimelstob (Kastles) 5, Travis Rettenmaier/Uladzimir Ignatik (Aces) 3 * XD: Mashona Washington/Justin Gimelstob (Kastles) 5, Anna Kournikova/Uladzimir Ignatik (Aces) 2 *** Justin Gimelstob substituted for Scott Oudsema at 2–0 * WD: Anna Kournikova/Jasmin Wöhr (Aces) 5, Mashona Washington/Sacha Jones (Kastles) 3 * OT - WD: Mashona Washington/Sacha Jones (Kastles) 1, Anna Kournikova/Jasmin Wöhr (Aces) 0 | 6–8 |

== Team personnel ==
=== On-court personnel ===
- (United States) Thomas Blake, Coach
- (United States) Justin Gimelstob
- (United States) Robby Ginepri (Note: Player appeared in fewer than three matches during the season as a substitute player and was not eligible to be protected in the following year's draft.)
- (New Zealand) Sacha Jones
- (United States) Kevin Kim
- (United States) Scott Oudsema
- (United States) Tripp Phillips
- (United States) Vince Spadea
- (United States) Mashona Washington
- (United States) Serena Williams

=== Front office ===
- Mark Ein, Owner

== Transactions ==
- March 19, 2008: The Kastles selected Serena Williams at the WTT Marquee Player Draft.
- April 1, 2008: The Kastles selected Justin Gimelstob, Sacha Jones, Scott Oudsema and Mashona Washington at the WTT RosterPlayer Draft.
- July 3, 2008: The Kastles signed Vince Spadea as a substitute player.
- July 5, 2008: The Kastles signed Tripp Phillips as a substitute player.
- July 6, 2008: The Kastles signed Robby Ginepri as a substitute player.
- July 12, 2008: The Kastles signed Kevin Kim as a substitute player.

== See also ==
- Sports in Washington, D.C.
