= 2008 World TeamTennis season =

- League: World TeamTennis
- Sport: Team tennis
- Duration: July 3–27, 2008
- Matches: Regular season: 77 (14 for each team); Postseason: 4
- Teams: 11
- TV partner(s): Versus; Tennis Channel

Draft
- Top draft pick: (United States) Lindsay Davenport
- Picked by: Newport Beach Breakers

Regular season
- Top seed: Kansas City Explorers
- Season MVP: (Paraguay) Ramón Delgado (Male MVP) (Newport Beach); (Australia) Rennae Stubbs; (Female MVP) (Kansas City)

Eastern Conference
- Season champions: New York Buzz
- Runners-up: New York Sportimes

Western Conference
- Season champions: Kansas City Explorers
- Runners-up: Sacramento Capitals

World TeamTennis Final
- Venue: Allstate Stadium at Westfield Galleria at Roseville
- Champions: New York Buzz
- Runners-up: Kansas City Explorers
- Championship MVP: (Australia) Rennae Stubbs (Kansas City)

World TeamTennis seasons
- ← 2007 2009 →

The 2008 World TeamTennis season was the 33rd season of the top professional team tennis league in the United States.

The New York Buzz defeated the Kansas City Explorers, 21–18, in the WTT Final to win the King Trophy as WTT champions.

== Competition format ==
The 2008 World TeamTennis season included 11 teams split into two conferences (Eastern and Western). The Eastern Conference had six teams, and the Western Conference had five teams. Each team played a 14-match regular-season schedule with seven home and seven away matches. The top teams in each conference were the conference champions. WTT Championship Weekend matches were played at Allstate Stadium at Westfield Galleria at Roseville in Roseville, California. The conference champions and runners-up qualified for the playoffs. In addition, there was a wild-card team that was either the host team (the Sacramento Capitals) or the team with the best record among teams that did not finish first or second in their conference, if the Capitals qualified based on finishing first or second. The teams were seeded 1 through 5, regardless of conference, with the top three seeds getting a bye to the WTT Semifinals. The fourth seed and the wild card met in a wild card match with the winner facing the number 1 seed in the semifinals. The other semifinal match pitted the number 2 seed against the number 3 seed. The winners of the semifinal matches met in the WTT Final to decide the winner of the King Trophy and the league championship. Higher seeded teams were treated as "home" teams in playoff matches and had the right to determine order of play.

== Franchise contraction and expansion ==
The Houston Wranglers folded following the 2007 season. Owner Linda McIngvale said, "This is not the right type of community for the Wranglers. We're just too big of a city with too many options. There's a jillion other things to do in the summertime in Houston." The team sold fewer than half of the 4,500 available tickets for a match that featured Anna Kournikova playing for the visitors. Late in the 2007 season, attendance at Wranglers' home matches was typically less than 1,000.

The Washington Kastles joined the league as an expansion franchise, making their debut in 2008. The team was founded by a group led by venture capitalist and entrepreneur Mark Ein, a native of Washington, D.C. At the press conference announcing the team's creation, Ein said, "I am thrilled to bring World TeamTennis to our area. WTT tennis is great entertainment emphasizing fan interaction, and it is the only major sport with men and women playing together on the same team. The Washington Kastles season will be an exciting summertime addition to our local economy and a fun activity for our entire community." The team was named after Kastle Systems, LLC, a provider of building and office security systems, of which Ein is the majority owner and managing member.

== Drafts ==
=== Marquee player draft ===
The 2008 WTT Marquee Player Draft was conducted in New York City on March 19, 2008. The order in which teams selected was based on the results the teams achieved in 2007 with weaker teams selecting earlier and stronger teams selecting later. The draft order is ordinarily determined as follows:

1. Nonplayoff teams ranked from worst regular-season record to best
2. Conference championship loser with the worse record of the two
3. Conference championship loser with the better record of the two
4. WTT Final loser
5. WTT champion

Expansion teams select in the middle of each round. If there is an even number of teams, an expansion team selects in the middle position that is closest to the first pick. There were seven nonplayoff teams in 2007, and ranked from worst record to best record, they were

1. Houston Wranglers
2. Newport Beach Breakers
3. St. Louis Aces
4. Boston Lobsters
5. New York Sportimes
6. Delaware Smash
7. Kansas City Explorers

However, the Wranglers folded prior to the draft. Therefore, the Breakers, Aces, Lobsters, Sportimes, Smash and Explorers were assigned the preliminary first through sixth draft positions. The Philadelphia Freedoms lost the 2007 Eastern Conference Championship Match and had a worse record than the Springfield Lasers, who lost the Western Conference Championship Match. Therefore, the Freedoms were assigned the preliminary seventh draft position and the Lasers the eighth. The New York Buzz lost the 2007 WTT Final and were assigned the preliminary ninth draft position. The 2007 WTT champion Sacramento Capitals were assigned the preliminary tenth draft position. The addition of the expansion Washington Kastles resulted in 11 teams in the league, and the Kastles were assigned the sixth draft position putting them in the middle with five teams drafting before them, and five teams drafting after them. This resulted in the Explorers, Freedoms, Lasers, Buzz and Capitals each moving down one position.

Teams could protect up to two marquee players or doubles teams to which they held the rights from the previous season or acquired in a trade. Rights to marquee players could be traded from one team to another before or during the draft, and the acquiring team could protect and then select those players. The selections made are shown in the tables below.

First round

No.	Team	Player chosen	Prot?	Notes
1	Newport Beach Breakers	(United States) Lindsay Davenport	N	
2	St. Louis Aces	(Russia) Anna Kournikova	Y	
3	Boston Lobsters	(United States) Martina Navratilova	N	
4	New York Sportimes	(United States) John McEnroe	Y	
5	Delaware Smash	Pass	–	
6	Washington Kastles	(United States) Serena Williams	N	
7	Kansas City Explorers	(United States) Bob and Mike Bryan	Y	Doubles team
8	Philadelphia Freedoms	(United States) Venus Williams	Y	
9	Springfield Lasers	Pass	–	
10	New York Buzz	Pass	–	
11	Sacramento Capitals	Pass	–	

Second round

No.	Team	Player chosen	Prot?	Notes
1	Newport Beach Breakers	Pass	–	
2	St. Louis Aces	(United States) Andy Roddick	N	
3	Boston Lobsters	Pass	–	
4	New York Sportimes	Pass	–	
5	Delaware Smash	Pass	–	
6	Washington Kastles	Pass	–	
7	Kansas City Explorers	Pass	–	
8	Philadelphia Freedoms	Pass	–	
9	Springfield Lasers	Pass	–	
10	New York Buzz	Pass	–	
11	Sacramento Capitals	Pass	–	

=== Roster player draft ===
The 2008 WTT Roster Player Draft was conducted in Miami on April 1, 2008. Teams selected in the same order as was determined for the Marquee Player Draft. Teams could protect up to four players to which they held the rights from the previous season or acquired in a trade. Rights to roster players could be traded from one team to another before or during the draft, and the acquiring team could protect and then select those players. In addition, the rights to make a selection in a particular position within the draft could be traded from one team to another. The selections made are shown in the tables below.

First round

No.	Team	Player chosen	Prot?
1	Newport Beach Breakers	(Paraguay) Ramón Delgado	Y
2	Sacramento Capitals (Note: The St. Louis Aces traded the second pick in the first round to the Sacramento Capitals in exchange for the rights to Anna Kournikova and the 11th pick in the second round.)	(United States) Eric Butorac	N
3	Boston Lobsters	(United States) Jan-Michael Gambill	N
4	New York Sportimes	(United States) Bethanie Mattek	N
5	Kansas City Explorers (Note: The Delaware Smash traded the fifth pick in the first round to the Kansas City Explorers in exchange for the seventh pick in the first round and other undisclosed consideration. The Smash used the seventh pick to select Alex Bogomolov Jr. and then traded him to the Philadelphia Freedoms for the eighth pick in the third round and other undisclosed consideration.)	(Australia) Rennae Stubbs	N
6	Washington Kastles	(United States) Justin Gimelstob	N
7	Delaware Smash	(United States) Alex Bogomolov Jr.	N
8	Philadelphia Freedoms	(United States) Lisa Raymond	Y
9	Springfield Lasers	(Thailand) Tamarine Tanasugarn	Y
10	New York Buzz	(Russia) Yaroslava Shvedova	N
11	Sacramento Capitals	(Russia) Elena Likhovtseva	Y

Second round

No.	Team	Player chosen	Prot?
1	Newport Beach Breakers	(Germany) Angelika Bachmann	N
2	St. Louis Aces	(Croatia) Jelena Pandžić	N
3	Boston Lobsters	(Israel) Amir Hadad	Y
4	New York Sportimes	(United States) Jesse Witten	Y
5	Delaware Smash	(United States) Ryler DeHeart	N
6	Washington Kastles	(New Zealand) Sacha Jones	N
7	Kansas City Explorers	(Czech Republic) Květa Peschke	N
8	Philadelphia Freedoms	(United States) Travis Parrott	Y
9	Springfield Lasers	(United States) Shenay Perry	N
10	New York Buzz	(Australia) Nathan Healey	N
11	St. Louis Aces	(Germany) Jasmin Wöhr	Y

Third round

No.	Team	Player chosen	Prot?
1	Newport Beach Breakers	(Mexico) Bruno Echagaray	N
2	St. Louis Aces	(Belarus) Uladzimir Ignatik	N
3	Boston Lobsters	(Canada) Marie-Ève Pelletier	N
4	New York Sportimes	(Czech Republic) Hana Šromová	Y
5	Delaware Smash	(South Africa) Chris Haggard	Y
6	Washington Kastles	(United States) Scott Oudsema	N
7	Kansas City Explorers	(United Kingdom) James Auckland	N
8	Delaware Smash	(United States) Madison Brengle	N
9	Springfield Lasers	(Australia) Todd Perry	Y
10	New York Buzz	(Czech Republic) Gabriela Navrátilová	Y
11	Sacramento Capitals	(Belgium) Tamaryn Hendler	N

Fourth round

No.	Team	Player chosen	Prot?
1	Newport Beach Breakers	(Czech Republic) Michaela Paštiková	Y
2	St. Louis Aces	(United States) Travis Rettenmaier	N
3	Boston Lobsters	(United States) Raquel Kops-Jones	N
4	New York Sportimes	(United States) Brian Wilson	N
5	Delaware Smash	(United States) Christina Fusano	N
6	Washington Kastles	(United States) Mashona Washington	N
7	Kansas City Explorers	(Serbia) Dušan Vemić	Y
8	Philadelphia Freedoms	(United States) Audra Cohen	N
9	Springfield Lasers	(United States) Glenn Weiner	Y
10	New York Buzz	(Serbia) Vladimir Obradović	N
11	Sacramento Capitals	(United States) Sam Warburg	Y

=== Roster-Exempt Player Draft ===
WTT conducted its 2008 Roster-Exempt Player Draft on the same day as its Roster Player Draft. Teams drafted in the same order as in the Marquee Player Draft and the Roster Player Draft. Teams were permitted to select part-time players classified by the league as either roster-exempt based on their recent appearances in international team events or featured roster players based on WTT's discretion. The selections made are shown in the table below.

No.	Team	Player chosen	Prot?	Notes
1	Newport Beach Breakers	Pass	–	
2	St. Louis Aces	Pass	–	
3	Boston Lobsters	Pass	–	
4	New York Sportimes	Pass	–	
5	Delaware Smash	(United States) Liezel Huber	Y	
6	Washington Kastles	Pass	–	
7	Kansas City Explorers	Pass	–	
8	Philadelphia Freedoms	Pass	–	
9	Springfield Lasers	Pass	–	
10	New York Buzz	Pass	–	
11	Sacramento Capitals	(Russia) Dmitry Tursunov	N	Featured roster player

== Event chronology ==
=== Off-season ===
- July 25, 2007: The Houston Wranglers announced that the franchise would fold.
- February 14, 2008: WTT announced that an expansion franchise had been awarded to Washington, D.C. to begin play in the 2008 season. The team was founded by a group led by Mark Ein, and it was named the Washington Kastles.
- March 18, 2008: The Boston Lobsters announced that their home matches would be played at the Ferncroft Country Club in Middleton, Massachusetts starting with the 2008 season.
- March 19, 2008: WTT conducted its Marquee Player Draft.
- March 19, 2008: The Philadelphia Freedoms announced that their home matches would be played at King of Prussia Mall in Upper Merion Township, Pennsylvania starting with the 2008 season.
- April 1, 2008: WTT conducted its Roster Player Draft and its Roster-Exempt Player Draft.
- April 30, 2008: The Washington Kastles announced that their home matches would be played in a temporary stadium to be constructed on the future site of CityCenterDC in Downtown Washington.

=== Regular season ===
- July 4, 2008: The Washington Kastles played their inaugural match and recorded a 23–19 overtime victory on the road against the Philadelphia Freedoms. Vince Spadea was the first player on the court representing the Kastles, winning the opening set of men's singles, 5–3. Mashona Washington and Scott Oudsema closed out the victory by winning the first game of overtime playing mixed doubles.
- July 8, 2008: The Washington Kastles made their home debut and suffered a 22–19 overtime loss to the Boston Lobsters.
- July 8, 2008: In an early-season matchup of two undefeated teams, the New York Sportimes defeated the New York Buzz at home, 22–20, in overtime, to improve their record to 3 wins and 0 losses and take sole possession of first place in the Eastern Conference. The Sportimes would remain in first place until the final day of the regular season.
- July 11, 2008: The Washington Kastles earned their first-ever home victory, a 22–21 win over the New York Buzz in a super tiebreaker. The Buzz led the match, 18–13, after four sets. Robby Ginepri won the closing set of men's singles against Nathan Healey, 5–3, to cut the deficit to 21–18. Ginepri then won three straight overtime games to send the match to a super tiebreaker, which he won, 7–4.
- July 13, 2008: After starting the season with six consecutive wins, the New York Sportimes suffered their first loss, a 23–17 defeat on the road against the Boston Lobsters.
- July 15, 2008: After starting the season with seven consecutive wins, the Kansas City Explorers suffered their only loss of the regular season, a 23–17 defeat at home against the New York Buzz.
- July 18, 2008: With a record of 9 wins and 1 loss, the Kansas City Explorers clinched their first playoff berth since 1993, when the New York Buzz defeated the Sacramento Capitals, 23–20 in overtime.
- July 18, 2008: With a record of 9 wins and 1 loss, the Kansas City Explorers clinched the Western Conference championship, when the New York Sportimes defeated the Newport Beach Breakers, 22–14.
- July 19, 2008: With a record of 2 wins and 9 losses, the Delaware Smash was eliminated from playoff contention, when it lost at home to the Sacramento Capitals, 20–18 in overtime.
- July 19, 2008: With a record of 10 wins and 1 loss, the Kansas City Explorers clinched a bye to the WTT Semifinals, when they defeated the Washington Kastles at home, 24–13. The loss by the Kastles also clinched a playoff berth and a bye to the WTT Semifinals for the New York Sportimes, who had a record of 9 wins and 2 losses.
- July 20, 2008: With a record of 8 wins and 4 losses, the New York Buzz clinched a playoff berth for the second consecutive season, when they defeated the New York Sportimes at home, 23–11. The Sportimes would have clinched the Eastern Conference championship had they won the match.
- July 20, 2008: With a record of 3 wins and 9 losses, the St. Louis Aces were eliminated from playoff contention when they lost at home to the Kansas City Explorers, 20–19 in a super tiebreaker.
- July 21, 2008: With a record of 8 wins and 4 losses, the New York Buzz clinched a bye to the WTT Semifinals, when the Boston Lobsters defeated the Newport Beach Breakers, 18–16 in overtime.
- July 22, 2008: With a record of 5 wins and 8 losses, the Washington Kastles were eliminated from playoff contention when they lost at home to the Delaware Smash, 20–16.
- July 22, 2008: With a record of 12 wins and 1 loss, the Kansas City Explorers clinched the best overall record in WTT with a 23–16 road victory over the Springfield Lasers, who were eliminated from playoff contention with a record of 5 wins and 9 losses.
- July 22, 2008: With a record of 5 wins and 8 losses, the Newport Beach Breakers were eliminated from playoff contention when they lost at home to the New York Sportimes, 17–15 in overtime. The Breakers' loss clinched second place in the Western Conference for the Sacramento Capitals, who had won earlier in the evening to improve their record to 7 wins and 6 losses. With the Capitals finishing among the top two positions in the Western Conference, the WTT wild card became available to the team with the best record among those not finishing first or second in their conference.
- July 23, 2008: With a record of 10 wins and 4 losses, the New York Buzz clinched its second straight Eastern Conference championship, when the Sacramento Capitals defeated the New York Sportimes, 20–19. The Capitals, who were guaranteed a playoff berth as the host of WTT Championship Weekend, finished the season with 8 wins and 6 losses and earned the fourth seed in the WTT playoffs with the victory. The Capitals' victory also clinched a playoff berth for the Boston Lobsters and eliminated the Philadelphia Freedoms, both of which had records of 7 wins and 7 losses. It was the first postseason appearance for the Lobsters since 2005.

=== Playoffs ===
- July 24, 2008: The Sacramento Capitals defeated the Boston Lobsters, 22–15, in the Wild Card Match. Sam Warburg won the opening set of men's singles for the Capitals and teamed with Eric Butorac to win the closing set of men's doubles. Butorac and Elena Likhovtseva had a set win in mixed doubles. Tamaryn Hendler won the women's singles set for the Capitals.
- July 25, 2008: The Kansas City Explorers defeated the Sacramento Capitals 21–10 in the WTT Semifinals. Květa Peschke won the women's singles set for the Explorers and teamed with Rennae Stubbs for a 5–0 set win in the closing set of women's doubles. Stubbs and Dušan Vemić won the mixed doubles set. Vemić and James Auckland had a set win in men's doubles.
- July 26, 2008: In the first-ever playoff matchup between the two New York teams, the New York Buzz defeated the New York Sportimes, 25–17, in overtime in the WTT Semifinals. Yaroslava Shvedova won the women's singles set and teamed with Nathan Healey for a set win in the opening set of mixed doubles and with Gabriela Navrátilová to take the fourth set of women's doubles in a tiebreaker. Healey won the men's singles set and then paired with Patrick Briaud to close out the match by winning the second game of overtime over John McEnroe and Jesse Witten, who recorded the Sportimes only set win of the match in men's doubles.
- July 27, 2008: The New York Buzz won the King Trophy as WTT champions with a 21–18 victory over the top-seeded Kansas City Explorers. The Buzz won the first two sets led by Nathan Healey in men's singles and Yaroslava Shvedova in women's singles to take a 10–6 lead. The Explorers won the third and fourth sets to tie the match at 16 all. First, Rennae Stubbs and Dušan Vemić earned a set win in mixed doubles. Next, Stubbs teamed with Květa Peschke to win the women's doubles set. In the decisive fifth set, Healey and Patrick Briaud converted both of their break-point opportunities while not facing one against Vemić and James Auckland to take the set, 5–2, and clinch the championship. The Buzz was awarded the final point of the match, when Vemić was ruled to have touched the net. Buzz coach Jay Udwadia said, "We played point by point today, and we never looked at the finish line. We really came together as a team this weekend, and this is a team I really want to keep together for next year. This is an absolutely great experience." Buzz owner Nitty Singh added, "We knew, from the time we drafted this team, we were going to win this year. This championship has been a long time coming, and things worked out well for us this year. We felt it was our year, our destiny." Stubbs was named Championship Most Valuable Player. She had the best combined winning percentage of any player in the semifinals and final. It was the first WTT title for the Buzz in its 14th season in the league and making its second consecutive and fourth overall trip to the Final.

== Standings ==
Eastern Conference
Pos	Team	MP	W	L	PCT	MB
1	New York Buzz	14	10	4	.714	0
2	New York Sportimes	14	10	4	.714	0
3	Boston Lobsters	14	7	7	.500	3
4	Philadelphia Freedoms	14	7	7	.500	3
5	Washington Kastles	14	6	8	.429	4
6	Delaware Smash	14	3	11	.214	7

New York Buzz and New York Sportimes split their head-to-head meetings during the regular season, 1 match each. Buzz wins the tiebreaker on games won in head-to-head meetings, 43–33.

Boston and Philadelphia split their head-to-head meetings during the regular season, 1 match each. Boston wins the tiebreaker on games won in head-to-head meetings, 44–37.

Western Conference
Pos	Team	MP	W	L	PCT	MB
1	Kansas City Explorers	14	13	1	.929	0
2	Sacramento Capitals	14	8	6	.571	5
3	Springfield Lasers	14	5	9	.357	8
4	Newport Beach Breakers	14	5	9	.357	8
5	St. Louis Aces	14	3	11	.214	10

Newport Beach and Springfield split their head-to-head meetings during the regular season, 1 match each. In those two head-to-head matches, the teams won 37 games each. Newport Beach played 11 matches against common opponents and won 205 games in those matches. Springfield played 9 matches against common opponents and won 165 games in those matches. Under WTT Rule 117, the number of games won in Newport Beach's two matches that were closest to and exceeding its average number of games won in matches with common opponents of 18.6 were disregarded. This eliminated 20 games won from one match and 21 from another, resulting in an adjusted number of games won in matches against common opponents of 164. Springfield wins the tiebreaker on games won in matches against common opponents, 165–164.

Delaware won its only head-to-head meeting during the regular season with St. Louis and wins the tiebreaker in the overall standings.

Qualified for 2008 WTT Playoffs

== Results table ==
Abbreviation and Color Key: Boston Lobsters – BOS • Delaware Smash – DEL • Kansas City Explorers – KAN • New York Buzz – NYB New York Sportimes – NYS • Newport Beach Breakers – NPB • Philadelphia Freedoms – PHI Sacramento Capitals – SAC • Springfield Lasers – SPR • St. Louis Aces – STL • Washington Kastles – WAS Win • Loss • Home • Away
Team	Match													
Team	1	2	3	4	5	6	7	8	9	10	11	12	13	14
Boston Lobsters	NYS	NYB	DEL	WAS	PHI	NYB	NYS	KAN	SPR	PHI	WAS	NPB	NPB	SAC
Boston Lobsters	18–19	16–23	23–19 (OT)	22–19 (OT)	21–22 (STB, 6–7)	19–20 (STB, 4–7)	23–17	17–22	23–19 (OT)	23–15	23–14 (OT)	18–21 (OT)	18–16 (OT)	13–21
Delaware Smash	NYB	STL	WAS	BOS	PHI	PHI	NYS	SPR	SPR	KAN	SAC	PHI	WAS	NYB
Delaware Smash	16–24	21–20	19–21 (OT)	19–23 (OT)	15–25 (OT)	17–19	17–22 (OT)	20–19 (STB, 7–6)	21–23	20–22 (OT)	18–20 (OT)	12–23	20–16	9–25
Kansas City Explorers	SAC	NPB	SPR	SAC	STL	STL	BOS	NYB	PHI	DEL	WAS	STL	SPR	NPB
Kansas City Explorers	22–21	20–18 (OT)	24–19 (OT)	25–15	22–18	25–17 (OT)	22–17	17–23	23–18 (OT)	22–20 (OT)	24–13	20–19 (STB, 7–6)	23–16	23–16
New York Buzz	DEL	STL	BOS	NYS	WAS	WAS	BOS	PHI	KAN	SAC	PHI	NYS	STL	DEL
New York Buzz	24–16	23–18	23–16	20–22 (OT)	22–21 (STB, 7–4)	21–22 (STB, 4–7)	20–19 (STB, 7–4)	18–22 (OT)	23–17	23–20 (OT)	15–25	23–11	25–13	25–9
New York Sportimes	BOS	PHI	NYB	WAS	DEL	PHI	BOS	PHI	WAS	SPR	NPB	NYB	NPB	SAC
New York Sportimes	19–18	21–18 (OT)	22–20 (OT)	21–20	22–17 (OT)	19–18 (STB, 7–5)	17–23	21–15	17–18 (STB, 5–7)	24–19 (OT)	22–14	11–23	17–15 (OT)	19–20
Newport Beach Breakers	SAC	KAN	SPR	STL	SPR	SAC	WAS	SAC	STL	NYS	BOS	BOS	NYS	KAN
Newport Beach Breakers	21–16 (OT)	18–20 (OT)	18–22	18–22 (OT)	19–15	20–21 (STB, 3–7)	16–18	23–16	23–14	14–22	21–18 (OT)	16–18 (OT)	15–17 (OT)	16–23
Philadelphia Freedoms	WAS	SPR	NYS	DEL	DEL	BOS	NYS	NYB	NYS	KAN	BOS	NYB	WAS	DEL
Philadelphia Freedoms	19–23 (OT)	22–23 (STB, 2–7)	18–21 (OT)	25–15 (OT)	19–17	22–21 (STB, 7–6)	18–19 (STB, 5–7)	22–18 (OT)	15–21	18–23 (OT)	15–23	25–15	23–19 (OT)	23–12
Sacramento Capitals	NPB	KAN	STL	SPR	KAN	SPR	NPB	NPB	STL	WAS	NYB	DEL	BOS	NYS
Sacramento Capitals	16–21 (OT)	21–22	22–21	19–22	15–25	18–14	21–20 (STB, 7–3)	16–23	25–12	20–15	20–23 (OT)	20–18 (OT)	21–13	20–19
Springfield Lasers	STL	PHI	KAN	NPB	SAC	NPB	SAC	DEL	DEL	BOS	NYS	STL	STL	KAN
Springfield Lasers	23–21 (OT)	23–22 (STB, 7–2)	19–24 (OT)	22–18	22–19	15–19	14–18	19–20 (STB, 6–7)	23–21	19–23 (OT)	19–24 (OT)	23–24 (STB, 5–7)	10–25	16–23
St. Louis Aces	SPR	DEL	NYB	SAC	NPB	KAN	KAN	SAC	NPB	SPR	SPR	KAN	NYB	WAS
St. Louis Aces	21–23 (OT)	20–21	18–23	21–22	22–18 (OT)	18–22	17–25 (OT)	12–25	14–23	24–23 (STB, 7–5)	25–10	19–20 (STB, 6–7)	13–25	17–22 (OT)
Washington Kastles	PHI	DEL	BOS	NYB	NYS	NYB	NPB	NYS	SAC	BOS	KAN	PHI	DEL	STL
Washington Kastles	23–19 (OT)	21–19 (OT)	19–22 (OT)	21–22 (STB, 4–7)	20–21	22–21 (STB, 7–4)	18–16	18–17 (STB, 7–5)	15–20	14–23 (OT)	13–24	19–23 (OT)	16–20	22–17 (OT)

== Playoff bracket ==
Wild Card Match (July 24)
4	Sacramento Capitals	22
5	Boston Lobsters	15

Semifinals (July 25–26)
1	Kansas City Explorers	21
4	Sacramento Capitals	10
2	New York Buzz	25*
3	New York Sportimes	17

WTT Final (July 27)
1	Kansas City Explorers	18
2	New York Buzz	21

*Indicates match went to overtime

== Playoff match summaries ==
All playoff matches were played as part of WTT Championship Weekend at Allstate Stadium at Westfield Galleria at Roseville in Roseville, California. Higher seeded teams (shown in CAPS below) were treated as "home" teams and had the right to determine the order of play.

=== Wild Card Match ===
July 24: #4 SACRAMENTO CAPITALS 22, #5 Boston Lobsters 15

- Men's singles: Sam Warburg (Capitals) def. Jan-Michael Gambill (Lobsters), 5–2
- Women's doubles: Raquel Kops-Jones and Marie-Ève Pelletier (Lobsters) def. Tamaryn Hendler and Elena Likhovtseva (Capitals), 5–2
- Mixed doubles: Elena Likhovtseva and Eric Butorac (Capitals) def. Raquel Kops-Jones and Amir Hadad (Lobsters), 5–2
- Women's singles: Tamaryn Hendler (Capitals) def. Marie-Ève Pelletier (Lobsters), 5–4
- Men's doubles: Eric Butorac and Sam Warburg (Capitals) def. Jan-Michael Gambill and Amir Hadad (Lobsters), 5–2

=== WTT Semifinals ===
July 25: #1 KANSAS CITY EXPLORERS 21, #4 Sacramento Capitals 10

- Men's singles: Sam Warburg (Capitals) def. Dušan Vemić (Explorers), 5–1
- Women's singles: Květa Peschke (Explorers) def. Elena Likhovtseva (Capitals), 5–1
- *** Elena Likhovtseva substituted for Tamaryn Hendler at 1–3
- Men's doubles: James Auckland and Dušan Vemić (Explorers) def. Eric Butorac and Sam Warburg (Capitals), 5–1
- Mixed doubles: Rennae Stubbs and Dušan Vemić (Explorers) def. Elena Likhovtseva and Eric Butorac (Capitals), 5–3
- Women's doubles: Květa Peschke and Rennae Stubbs (Explorers) def. Tamaryn Hendler and Elena Likhovtseva (Capitals), 5–0

July 26: #2 NEW YORK BUZZ 25, #3 New York Sportimes 17 (overtime)

- Mixed doubles: Yaroslava Shvedova and Nathan Healey (Buzz) def. Hana Šromová and John McEnroe (Sportimes), 5–3
- Women's singles: Yaroslava Shvedova (Buzz) def. Ashley Harkleroad (Sportimes), 5–2
- Men's singles: Nathan Healey (Buzz) def. Jesse Witten (Sportimes), 5–2
- Women's doubles: Gabriela Navrátilová and Yaroslava Shvedova (Buzz) def. Ashley Harkleroad and Hana Šromová (Sportimes), 5–4
- Men's doubles: John McEnroe and Jesse Witten (Sportimes) def. Patrick Briaud and Nathan Healey (Buzz), 5–4
- Overtime – Men's doubles: Patrick Briaud and Nathan Healey (Buzz) tied John McEnroe and Jesse Witten (Sportimes), 1–1

=== WTT Final ===
July 27: #2 New York Buzz 21, #1 KANSAS CITY EXPLORERS 18

- Men's singles: Nathan Healey (Buzz) def. Dušan Vemić (Explorers), 5–3
- Women's singles: Yaroslava Shvedova (Buzz) def. Květa Peschke (Explorers), 5–3
- Mixed doubles: Rennae Stubbs and Dušan Vemić (Explorers) def. Yaroslava Shvedova and Nathan Healey (Buzz), 5–3
- Women's doubles: Květa Peschke and Rennae Stubbs (Explorers) def. Gabriela Navrátilová and Yaroslava Shvedova (Buzz), 5–3
- Men's doubles: Patrick Briaud and Nathan Healey (Buzz) def. James Auckland and Dušan Vemić (Explorers), 5–2

== Individual honors ==
Award	Recipient	Team
Female Most Valuable Player	Rennae Stubbs	Kansas City Explorers
Male Most Valuable Player	Ramón Delgado	Newport Beach Breakers
Female Rookie of the Year	Yaroslava Shvedova	New York Buzz
Male Rookie of the Year	Travis Parrott	Philadelphia Freedoms
Coach of the Year	Brent Haygarth	Kansas City Explorers
WTT Championship Most Valuable Player	Rennae Stubbs	Kansas City Explorers

== Television ==
There were seven WTT regular-season matches telecast nationally on the Tennis Channel. These matches all featured marquee players and were recorded and premiered between two and eight days after they were played. The WTT Final was telecast live on Versus. It was the first live telecast of the WTT Final since 2004. Select matches shown on the Tennis Channel were also rebroadcast by regional sports networks.

== See also ==
- Team tennis
