= Mouna Sabri =

Moroccan tennis player (born 1984)

- Country (sports): Morocco
- Born: 2 February 1984 (age 42) Morocco
- College: Drury University
- Prize money: $675

Singles
- Career record: 0–5
- Highest ranking: 1,100 (22 July 2002)

Doubles
- Career record: 0–1

Team competitions
- Fed Cup: 0–1

Mouna Sabri (born 2 February 1984) is a former Moroccan tennis player, who played at the Morocco on the Fed Cup in 2003.

Sabri has a career-high ITF juniors ranking of 577, achieved on 3 January 2000.

She played at Drury University, in 2007 won Great Lakes Valley Conference player of the year award.

== National representation ==
=== Fed Cup ===
Sabri made her Fed Cup debut for Morocco in 2003, while the team was competing in the Europe/Africa Zone Group II, when she was 19 years and 87 days old.

==== Fed Cup (0–1) ====
Group membership World Group (0–0) World Group Play-off (0–0) World Group II (0–0) World Group II Play-off (0–0) Europe/Africa Group (0–1)	Matches by surface Hard (0–0) Clay (0–1) Grass (0–0) Carpet (0–0)	Matches by type Singles (0–0) Doubles (0–1)	Matches by setting Indoors (0–0) Outdoors (0–1)

===== Doubles (0–1) =====
Edition	Stage	Date	Location	Against	Surface	Partner	Opponents	W/L	Score
2003 Fed Cup; Europe/Africa Zone Group II	Pool D	30 April 2003	Estoril, Portugal	Malta	Clay	Bahia Mouhtassine	Lisa Camenzuli; Carol Cassar-Torreggiani	L	6–4, 1–6, 3–6
