= New York Buzz =

Professional tennis team in New York, United States

- Sport: Team tennis
- Founded: 1995
- League: World TeamTennis
- Conference: Eastern (2000 to 2010)
- Team history: New York OTBzz; 1995–1998; Schenectady County Electrics; 1999–2000; New York Buzz; 2001–2010; New York Sportimes; 2011–2013; San Diego Aviators; 2014–present
- Based in: Guilderland, New York
- Stadium: SEFCU Arena (Capacity: 2,100)
- Colors: Black, royal blue, yellow, alizarin crimson
- Owner: Nitty Singh
- President: Nitty Singh
- Head coach: Jay Udwadia
- Championships: 2008
- Conference titles: 3 Eastern Conference Championships 2002, 2007, 2008
- Playoff berths: 6 – 1995, 1998, 1999, 2002, 2007, 2008
- Website: www.nybuzzwtt.com

The New York Buzz was a professional tennis team competing in World TeamTennis (WTT). The team was originally based in Schenectady, New York, from 1995 to 2007, before moving to Albany, New York, in 2008, and Guilderland, New York, in 2009. The team was founded as the New York OTBzz in 1995, before changing its name to the Schenectady County Electrics in 1999, and finally adopting the name New York Buzz in 2001. In 2008, the team won its third Eastern Conference Championship and went on to defeat the Kansas City Explorers to capture its first and only King Trophy in its fourth appearance in the WTT Final.

On February 14, 2011, WTT announced that the New York Buzz and New York Sportimes had merged and would play the 2011 season as the New York Sportimes. In the three seasons following the merger, the Sportimes played home matches in both New York City and the Capital District every year. In 2013, a majority (five of seven) of the Sportimes' home matches were played in Guilderland. On January 16, 2014, Claude Okin, CEO of the New York Sportimes announced that the franchise had been sold to businessman Russell Geyser and his minority partner Jack McGrory, and the team would be relocated to San Diego, California, and renamed the San Diego Aviators.

== Team history of the New York Buzz up to the 2011 merger with the New York Sportimes ==
=== Early years as New York OTBzz ===
New York OTBzz logo used from 1995 to 1998.

The New York OTBzz were founded by Nitty Singh as a WTT expansion franchise in 1995. The team was named pursuant to a sponsorship agreement with the Capital Region Off-Track Betting Corp. The OTBzz made their debut with a 23–21 overtime loss on the road against the Florida Twist at the Country Club of Sarasota Tennis Center in Sarasota, Florida on July 14, 1995. Their home debut the following day resulted in a victory against the Charlotte Express. The four primary players for the OTBzz during their first season were Brenda Schultz-McCarthy, Roger Smith, Dave Randall and Rachel Jensen. Schultz-McCarty and Randall were the top-ranked mixed doubles team in WTT in 1995. The OTBzz finished their first regular season with 10 wins and 6 losses, second in the East Division, and lost 28–19 in the semifinals to the defending champion New Jersey Stars who went on to repeat as champions led by Martina Navratilova. Schultz-McCarthy was named WTT Female Rookie of the Year.

For their first 13 seasons (1995–2007), the OTBzz played most of their home matches outdoors at Central Park Tennis Stadium in Schenectady, New York. In instances where heavy rain was in the forecast making it impossible to play outdoors, and in the case of a power failure at Central Park Tennis Stadium before the opening match of the 2005 season, matches were occasionally moved indoors to Sportime Schenectady in Rotterdam, New York, just outside Schenectady or to the Tri-City Racquet Club in Latham, New York, a bit further away from Schenectady. Some matches featuring opposing teams with marquee players were scheduled to be played indoors. For the OTBzz's first season at Central Park Tennis Stadium, the team had to play all its matches in the daytime, because the stadium had no lights. The Schenectady Common Council had lights installed in the stadium allowing night matches to be played starting in 1996. No admission was charged to the OTBzz's home matches for their first three seasons. In 1998, the team started charging $7 for general admission tickets.

In 1996, Dave Randall was the only one of the OTBzz's four regular players from the successful 1995 team to return, and New York dropped off to a record of 5 wins and 7 losses, fifth in WTT, and missed the playoffs. The OTBzz finished 1997, with 5 wins and 9 losses, sixth in WTT, and again missed the playoffs.

=== First appearance in WTT Final ===
In 1998, spurred on by the performances of male rookie of the year Geoff Grant, female rookie of the year Nana Miyagi and veteran Dave Randall, the OTBzz finished first in WTT with a regular season record of 11 wins and 3 losses. Mary Joe Fernández also appeared for the OTBzz during the regular season as a marquee player. After beating the St. Louis Aces, 28–18, in a semifinal match, the OTBzz faced the defending champion Sacramento Capitals in the team's first ever WTT Final. The OTBzz were routed by the Capitals, 30–13, losing all five sets. OTBzz coach Inderjit Singh (husband of team founder and owner Nitty Singh) was named WTT Coach of the Year. Singh retired following the season and was replaced by Gerry Cuva. Randall, the last player remaining on the team from its inaugural 1995 season, also retired at the end of 1998.

=== Name change to Schenectady County Electrics ===
Schenectady County Electrics logo used from 1999 to 2000.

Following the 1998 season, Capital District Off-Track Betting Corp. withdrew from its sponsorship agreement with the OTBzz, and the team changed its name to the Schenectady County Electrics for the 1999 season. The name of the team's location was changed from New York to Schenectady County in exchange for a subsidy approved by the Schenectady County legislature.

The Electrics drafted the legendary Martina Navratilova as their marquee player prior to the 1999 season. Navratilova committed to play two matches. After losing their first two matches of the 1999 season, the Electrics bounced back in the next two matches to even their record. Jana Novotná, then ranked number 4 in the world, was scheduled to play for the Electrics in their fifth match. However, she had to pull out with a left ankle injury and never ended up appearing in a match for the Electrics. Despite the presence of Navratilova, the Electrics finished with 5 wins and 7 losses, fourth in WTT and lost to the Sacramento Capitals in the semifinals.

The Electrics protected Navratilova for the 2000 season, and she was the only holdover player from the previous year. In the marquee player draft, the Electrics selected Mary Pierce, then ranked number 4 in the world, and Pierce committed to play at least three matches. In the roster draft, the Electrics selected Rita Grande, then the number 1 Italian player, Nannie DeVilliers, former WTT male rookie of the year Michael Hill and Brent Haygarth. The Electrics traded their own former male rookie of the year, Geoff Grant, to the Delaware Smash for cash consideration. The Electrics finished the season with 8 wins and 6 losses, second place in the Eastern Conference.

=== Name change to New York Buzz ===
Following the 2000 season, the Electrics were renamed the New York Buzz. The Buzz continued to retain the rights to Martina Navratilova, but for the second consecutive season, she was the only returning player. The new players selected by the Buzz in the roster draft were Mahesh Bhupathi (frequent mixed doubles partner of Navratilova), Justin Bower, Jana Nejedly (top ranked Canadian female at the time) and 1996 NCAA singles champion Jill Craybas. In May, Navratilova announced should would not be able to play for the Buzz in 2001, due to scheduling conflicts. In July, she signed with the Delaware Smash and played two matches with them filling in for Serena Williams. The Buzz finished the season with 9 wins and 5 losses, second in the Eastern Conference, just one match behind conference champion Philadelphia Freedoms.

=== Eastern Conference Championship ===
Prior to the 2002 season, improvements were made to Central Park Tennis Stadium, and the venue was renamed Central Park MVP Stadium. The Buzz selected former world number 1 Lindsay Davenport (ranked number 9 at the time) as their marquee player replacing Navratilova. Mahesh Bhupathi and Nannie DeVilliers returned to the team. Justin Bower and Liezel Huber were added to the roster, and the Buzz had its best season to date winning the Eastern Conference championship with 11 wins and 3 losses, the best record in WTT. Bhupati was named WTT Male Most Valuable Player. Buzz coach Eric Kutner was named WTT Coach of the Year. Because she advanced deep into a WTA tournament, Davenport was not available for the WTT Final. In the second trip to the WTT Final for the Buzz franchise, they met the same opponent as in 1998, the Sacramento Capitals who defeated the Buzz, 21–13, for their fifth title in six years. Bhupathi was not available for the final, because he was playing in an ATP Tour doubles match that had been rained out the previous day.

=== Buzz falls on hard times ===
Boris Becker was chosen by the Buzz in the 2003 marquee player draft. Nannie DeVilliers and Justin Bower returned from the 2002 Eastern Conference Champions. Don Johnson and Eva Dyrberg were the other newcomers. Jolene Watanabe was named the new coach of the Buzz becoming the first female coach in WTT history. The Buzz struggled in 2003, finishing the season with 4 wins and 10 losses.

Martina Navratilova returned to the Buzz for the 2004 season after a four-year absence when she was selected in the marquee player draft. Justin Bower was the only returning player from the previous season. Marissa Irvin, Bryanne Stewart and Shaun Rudman made up the rest of the team. The Buzz struggled again in 2004, posting only 5 wins against 9 losses and finishing fourth in the Eastern Conference.

In 2005, Jim Courier was selected by the Buzz as its marquee player. Bryanne Stewart was the only player returning from the previous season. Evie Dominikovic, Brian Vahaly and Jaymon Crabb were newcomers. For the second straight year, the Buzz finished with 5 wins and 9 losses. They were fifth in the Eastern Conference.

For the 2006 season, Central Park MVP Stadium was renamed CDPHP Tennis Complex pursuant to a sponsorship agreement with Capital District Physicians Health Plan. The Buzz decided not to draft a marquee player for the 2006 season, and none of their players from 2005 returned to the team. The players the Buzz selected in the roster draft were Viktoriya Kutuzova, Gastón Etlis, Scott Lipsky and Julie Ditty. Jolene Watanable continued coaching the team. Despite the completely new roster, the results were the same as the Buzz finished with 5 wins and 9 losses for the third consecutive season, last place in the Eastern Conference by virtue of the Boston Lobsters winning the standings tiebreaker.

=== Another Eastern Conference Championship ===
The Buzz completely remade its roster again in 2007. For the second straight year, the team elected to pass on making a selection in the marquee player draft. Julie Ditty was traded to the Boston Lobsters. The Buzz selected 2005 WTT Rookie of the Year Rik de Voest in the first round of the roster draft and Ashley Fisher in the second round. In the third round, the Buzz traded down in exchange for cash consideration from the Newport Beach Breakers. The Breakers used the Buzz's number 2 pick to select Lauren Albanese while the Buzz used the Breakers' number 10 choice to take Gabriela Navrátilová. The Buzz drafted Gréta Arn in the fourth round. After four straight losing seasons, the Buzz finally turned its fortunes finishing with 8 wins and 6 losses tied for first place with the Philadelphia Freedoms in the highly competitive Eastern Conference. Only 2 match wins separated first place from last place in the conference. The Buzz won a standings tiebreaker over the Freedoms making it the top seed in the conference.

The Buzz squared off against the Freedoms in the Eastern Conference Championship Match. The Buzz fell behind 10–6 after two sets losing mixed doubles and women's doubles. In the third set, de Voest and Fisher topped Frédéric Niemeyer and Daniel Nestor in men's doubles, 5–2, to cut the Freedoms' lead to 12–11 at halftime. Olga Savchuk won a tiebreaker against Arn to take women's singles, 5–4, and give the Freedoms a 17–15 lead heading to the final set. De Voest stepped up big taking the men's singles from Niemeyer, 5–2, to squeeze out a 20–19 victory and give the Buzz their second Eastern Conference Championship.

The following day, the Buzz played in its third WTT Final, and for the third time, it met the Sacramento Capitals. The Capitals won the first four sets, three of them in tiebreakers, to take a 20–15 lead to the final set. De Voest and Fisher beat Mark Knowles and Sam Warburg in men's doubles, 5–3 to take that final set and send the match to overtime with the Capitals leading 23–20. Knowles and Warburg won the first game of overtime to give the Capitals the title, 24–20. Despite the Buzz's loss, de Voest was named WTT Championship Most Valuable Player.

=== Move to Albany and first King Trophy ===
For the 2008 season, the defending Eastern Conference Champion Buzz moved to the larger Washington Avenue Armory Sports and Convention Center in Albany, New York. Buzz ownership said that it moved to the air-conditioned indoor arena which seats about 4,000 people for tennis, because it has secure parking to serve the team's growing fan base and to "give the team much more visibility and awareness and help increase the level of hospitality the Buzz wish to provide."

For the third straight season, the Buzz passed on selecting a player in the marquee player draft. Gabriela Navrátilová was the only player returning from the previous season's conference champions. Yaroslava Shvedova was selected in the first round of the roster player draft, and Nathan Healey was taken in the second round. Navrátilová was taken as a protected pick in the third round, and Vladimir Obradović was the final selection. Jay Udwadia was named new coach of the Buzz. Before the season started, Obradović suffered a knee injury that would prevent him from playing for the Buzz. Owner/general manager Nitty Singh signed Patrick Briaud as a free agent just two days before the start of the season to take Obradović's roster spot.

A change in the WTT playoff format for 2008, meant that the conference championship was determined by regular-season results. The Buzz posted a record of 10 wins and 4 losses which was identical to the record of the New York Sportimes. The two teams split the two matches they played during the regular season, but the Buzz won more games in those two matches giving them the tiebreaker edge and their second consecutive Eastern Conference Championship. Yaroslava Shvedova was named WTT female rookie of the year.

As the number 2 overall seed in the WTT playoffs, the Buzz was matched against the number 3 seeded Sportimes. In the first ever postseason matchup between the two New York clubs, the Buzz dominated the match winning the first four sets. Nathan Healey and Yaroslava Shvedova opened the match with a 5–3 set win against John McEnroe and Hana Šromová in mixed doubles. Shvedova followed with a 5–2 women's singles win over Ashley Harkleroad. Healy took care of Jesse Witten, 5–2, in men's singles. Gabriela Navrátilová and Shvedova needed a tiebreaker to beat Harkleroad and Šromová, 5–4, and give the Buzz a 20–11 lead heading to the final set. McEnroe and Witten won a tiebreaker over Patrick Briaud and Healy in the men's doubles to force overtime with the Buzz leading 24–16. Briaud and Healy won the second game of overtime to give the Buzz a 25–17 victory and send it to its fourth WTT Final.

In the WTT Final, the Buzz faced the Kansas City Explorers who were coming off a regular season record of 13 wins and 1 loss and thrashed the defending champion Sacramento Capitals 21–10 in the semifinals. Nathan Healey got the Buzz off to a good start with a win in the first set of men's singles over Dušan Vemić, 5–3. Yaroslava Shvedova followed with a 5–3 set win over Květa Peschke in women's singles to give the Buzz a 10–6 lead. The Explorers fought back with a 5–3 set win by Rennae Stubbs and Vemić in mixed doubles over Shvedova and Healey. Stubbs and Peschke then registered a 5–3 set win over Shvedova and Gabriela Navrátilová in women's doubles to tie the match, 16–16. In the final set, Healey and Patrick Briaud topped James Auckland and Vemić in men's doubles, 5–2, to secure the first King Trophy in Buzz history. Despite playing for the losing team, Stubbs was named WTT Championship Most Valuable Player.

=== Another move ===
After just one season at the Washington Avenue Armory, the Buzz moved again to SEFCU Arena in Guilderland, New York on the campus of the University at Albany. Longtime Buzz owner Nitty Singh cited problems with the air conditioning, parking and location of the armory as reasons for moving. She said, "We want something that is easily accessible. We don’t want to worry about the neighborhood. Last year, a lot of local people, especially [from] Schenectady, were a little leery about going down to the Armory.”

In 2009, the Buzz continued its practice of passing on drafting a marquee player. Despite being the defending WTT champions, the Buzz did not protect any of their players from the previous year's team. Instead, it drafted four new players in the roster draft and put together the youngest team in WTT history. In the order selected, the players drafted by the Buzz and their ages at the time were Sloane Stephens, 16, Christina McHale, 16, Evan King, 17, and Alex Domijan, 17. Roger Smith, who played for the OTBzz in their inaugural 1995 season was named the new Buzz coach. After the roster draft, Buzz owner Nitty Singh said, “We are extremely excited to showcase America’s finest juniors on our New York Buzz team this season. This keeps with our tradition of presenting the game’s future stars such as Andre Agassi, Pete Sampras and Lindsay Davenport who also played tournaments here in the Capital Region during the early part of their careers.” With three of their four regular full-time players having other commitments during the season, none of them other than Domijan were able to play in every match. The Buzz ended up using 13 different players in 2009, all of which were young amateurs. The optimism at the outset of the season evolved into the chaos of a rotating door through which players came and went resulting in a record for the Buzz of 4 wins and 10 losses, fourth in the Eastern Conference and barely avoided a last place finish by winning a standings tiebreaker over the Philadelphia Freedoms.

=== Martina Hingis plays full-time for the Buzz ===
The Buzz selected former world number 1 Martina Hingis in the 2010 marquee player draft, and Hingis committed to playing full-time. Alex Domijan was the only player to return from the 2009 squad. Although he wasn't protected by the Buzz, the team chose him in the third round of the roster draft. In the first two rounds, the Buzz selected Scoville Jenkins and Sarah Borwell. With Hingis committed to playing full-time, the Buzz didn't need its fourth round choice in the roster draft and sold the pick to the Sacramento Capitals for cash consideration. Jay Udwadia, who coached the Buzz to its only WTT championship in 2008, returned as the team's coach after a one-year absence. While the team continued to call SEFCU Arena its home, the July 9 home match against the Washington Kastles was played at the larger Glens Falls Civic Center in Glens Falls, New York, since it was expected to feature Hingis against Serena Williams in the women's singles set. Williams, who had just won her fourth Wimbledon ladies' singles title a few days before, did not play in the match in Glens Falls. With the Buzz struggling with 2 wins and 9 losses, Yvette Hyndman started getting some playing time late in the season. Despite the full-time presence of Hingis, the Buzz suffered the worst season in team history finishing with 2 wins and 12 losses, the worst record in WTT in 2010.

=== Merger with Sportimes ===
On February 14, 2011, WTT announced that the New York Buzz and New York Sportimes had merged with the resulting combined team to be called the New York Sportimes. The team would play five of its seven home matches each season in New York City and the other two at SEFCU Arena in Guilderland, former home of the Buzz. Nitty Singh, founder and longtime owner and general manager of the Buzz said that she wanted to refocus her efforts on two big events rather than operation of a year-round franchise. “We’re taking the fan and sponsor experience to a higher level with two fantastic nights of World TeamTennis action,” said Singh. “It’s a Grand Slam tennis experience. We will have big names coming to Albany each night, and our most loyal fans will follow the team back and forth from New York City. It will be a great new era for World TeamTennis in the Capital Region.”

== Season-by-season records ==
The following table shows regular season records, playoff results and titles won by the New York Buzz franchise prior to its merger with the New York Sportimes in 2011.

Year	Team Name	W	L	PCT	Playoff result	Titles won
1995	New York OTBzz	10	6	.625	Lost in WTT Semifinals	
1996	New York OTBzz	5	7	.417	Missed playoffs	
1997	New York OTBzz	5	7	.357	Missed playoffs	
1998	New York OTBzz	11	3	.786	Won WTT Semifinal Match; Lost in WTT Final	Best regular-season record in WTT
1999	Schenectady County Electrics	5	7	.417	Lost in WTT Semifinals	
2000	Schenectady County Electrics	8	6	.571	Missed playoffs	
2001	New York Buzz	9	5	.643	Missed playoffs	
2002	New York Buzz	11	3	.786	Lost in WTT Final	Eastern Conference Champions; Best regular-season record in WTT
2003	New York Buzz	4	10	.286	Missed playoffs	
2004	New York Buzz	5	9	.357	Missed playoffs	
2005	New York Buzz	5	9	.357	Missed playoffs	
2006	New York Buzz	5	9	.357	Missed playoffs	
2007	New York Buzz	8	6	.571	Won Eastern Conference Championship Match; Lost in WTT Final	Eastern Conference Champions
2008	New York Buzz	10	4	.714	Won WTT Semifinal Match; Won WTT Final Match	WTT Champions; Eastern Conference Champions
2009	New York Buzz	4	10	.286	Missed playoffs	
2010	New York Buzz	2	12	.143	Missed playoffs	
Totals		107	113	.486	WTT Finals: 1 win, 3 losses, .250; All Playoff Matches: 4 wins, 5 losses, .444	WTT Champions - 1 (2008); Eastern Conference Champions - 3 (2002, 2007, 2008); Best regular-season record in WTT - 2 (1998, 2002)

== Home courts ==
The following table shows home courts used by the New York Buzz franchise prior to its merger with the New York Sportimes in 2011.

Venue	Location	Duration		Notes
Venue	Location	Start	End	Notes
CDPHP Tennis Complex (Note: The stadium was called Central Park Tennis Stadium from 1995 to 2001. It was called Central Park MVP Stadium from 2002 to 2005. It was renamed CDPHP Tennis Complex before the 2006 season.)	Schenectady, New York	1995	2007	Primary home venue
Sportime Schenectady	Rotterdam, New York	1995	2007	Alternate venue in case of rain
Tri-City Racquet Club	Latham, New York	2005	2005	Alternate venue used because of a power failure at Central Park MVP Stadium
Washington Avenue Armory Sports and Convention Center	Albany, New York	2008	2008	Primary home venue
SEFCU Arena	Guilderland, New York	2009	2010	Primary home venue
Glens Falls Civic Center	Glens Falls, New York	2010	2010	One marquee match played at the venue

== Individual honors ==
The following table shows individual honors bestowed upon players and coaches of the New York Buzz franchise prior to its merger with the New York Sportimes in 2011.

Year	Player/Coach	Award
1995	Brenda Schultz-McCarthy	Female Rookie of the Year
1998	Nana Miyagi	Female Rookie of the Year
1998	Geoff Grant	Male Rookie of the Year
1998	Inderjit Singh	Coach of the Year
2002	Mahesh Bhupathi	Male Most Valuable Player
2002	Eric Kutner	Coach of the Year
2007	Rik de Voest	Championship Most Valuable Player
2008	Yaroslava Shvedova	Female Rookie of the Year

== Hall of Fame players ==
The following players who are enshrined in the International Tennis Hall of Fame played for the New York Buzz franchise prior to its merger with the New York Sportimes in 2011:

- Martina Navratilova 1999–2000, 2004
- Lindsay Davenport 2002
- Boris Becker 2003
- Jim Courier 2005
- Martina Hingis 2010

== See also ==
- World TeamTennis
- New York Sportimes
- San Diego Aviators
