= Audra Cohen =

American tennis player

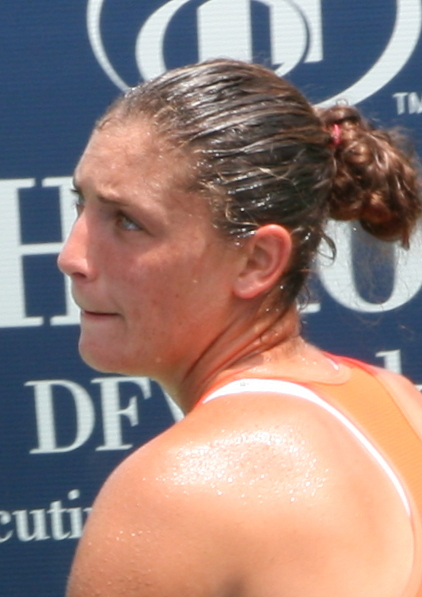
- Cohen in 2009
- Full name: Audra Marie Cohen
- Country (sports): United States
- Residence: Plantation, Florida, U.S.
- Born: April 21, 1986 (age 39) California, U.S.
- Height: 5 ft 9 in (1.75 m)
- Turned pro: 2003
- Retired: 2011
- Plays: Right-handed (two-handed backhand)
- College: Northwestern; Miami
- Prize money: $ 72,967

Singles
- Career record: 59–63
- Career titles: 0 WTA, 1 ITF
- Highest ranking: No. 229 (03 November 2009)

Grand Slam singles results
- US Open: 1R (2007)

Doubles
- Career record: 25–23
- Career titles: 0 WTA, 2 ITF
- Highest ranking: No. 271 (27 April 2009)

Grand Slam doubles results
- US Open: 2R (2004)
- Last updated on: 20 April 2011.

Audra Marie Cohen (born April 21, 1986) is an American former professional tennis player and current college tennis coach. She was the # 1 collegiate female tennis player in the United States in 2007. At the University of Miami in 2005-2006 she was named the ITA National Player of the Year and was the National Indoor Champion, and in 2006-07 she won the ITA National Indoor Intercollegiate Championship, the NCAA Singles Championship, and the ITA National Player of the Year award. She is currently the head women's tennis coach at the University of Oklahoma.

Her career-high world rank was 229 in singles, and 271 in doubles.

== Early life ==
Cohen was born in California and is Jewish. When Cohen was a child, she first excelled at swimming, but she picked up a tennis racquet at the age of nine, and became a self-described “club rat,” who would hit as much as possible. She learned tennis at Bill Clark's Tennis Academy.

== High school ==
Cohen attended St. Thomas Aquinas High School in Fort Lauderdale, Florida. She won the Florida state championship in singles and doubles as a junior and a senior, and was undefeated and an All American and was named the Miami Herald and Sun-Sentinel Player of the Year during both her junior and senior seasons. She was a four-time All-State and All-County Award recipient. As a senior, she earned the USTA National Sportsmanship Award and was named USTA Florida Player of the Year. In her senior year she also won the Easter Bowl doubles championship, and was a doubles champion in the Clay Courts Super Nationals, Hard Court Super Nationals, and Winter Super Nationals.

== College career ==
Cohen attended Northwestern University in the Fall of 2004, and won her first 23 singles matches. She then won the ITA National Singles Title, the ITA National Indoor Doubles Championship, and the ITA Midwest Championships. In 2004–05 at Northwestern, Cohen played No. 1 singles and was 51–7. Her 51 wins tied her for third all-time since 1988. She was named All-American in both singles and doubles, received the ITA Midwest Regional Rookie Player of the Year Award and the ITA National Rookie of the Year Award, was named Big Ten Freshman of the Year and Athlete of the Year, was named to the All-Big Ten team.

Cohen later transferred after her freshman year and attended the University of Miami, and played tennis for the Miami Hurricanes. In 2005–2006 at Miami she was 34–2 in singles and 30–6 in doubles. She sat out the fall season while recovering from injury that required serious back surgery. She was named the ITA National Player of the Year, National Indoor Champion, ACC Player of the Year, and All-ACC team. She completed her first season ranked #1 in singles and #2 in doubles. She was voted All-American in singles and doubles, and named to the All-NCAA tournament team at the No. 1 position.

In the Fall of 2006 she was 11–1, and won the National Indoor Championship. During 2006–07, Cohen won the ITA National Indoor Intercollegiate Championship and the NCAA Singles championship. She won the ITA National Player of the Year and ACC Player of the Year awards. She also won the 2007 Honda Sports Award as the nation's best female tennis player. Cohen was honored by Miami-Dade County with “Audra Cohen Day” on June 29, 2007.

Cohen left Miami after her junior year to turn professional, with a record of 76–4 in singles. She earned her B.A. in Psychology cum laude in 2009.

She was voted into the University of Miami Sports Hall of Fame in 2017.

== Pro tournaments ==
She defeated world No. 92 Olga Savchuk, in August 2006 in New Haven, Connecticut. Cohen defeated world No 93 Varvara Lepchenko in a three-set match, in October 2006 in Augusta, Georgia.

In August 2007 in Forest Hills, New York, in her greatest upset to date, Cohen defeated world No. 59 Elena Likhovtseva of Russia. At the 2007 US Open, she entered as a wild card and was defeated in the first round by Andrea Petkovic of Germany. In April 2008 in Amelia Island she beat world No. 89 Galina Voskoboeva. In May 2008, partnering with Heidi El Tabakh, she won the Landisville doubles.

In September 2008 in Beijing she defeated world No. 84 Anne Keothavong of Great Britain in straight sets. Cohen's season-ending rankings were No. 579 in 2006, No. 384 in 2007, and No. 230 in 2008. In 2011, she retired from tennis.

== Pan American Games ==
Cohen was a captain on the 2007 Pan-American Games Team USA, playing both singles and doubles in tennis.

== Coaching career ==
Starting in 2009, Cohen began her collegiate coaching career with a two-year stint as an assistant women's tennis coach at the University of Wisconsin.

in 2011 she joined the University of North Florida, as the head coach of the women's tennis team, the Ospreys. She was a three-time Atlantic Sun Coach of the Year in five seasons, leading the team to a 77–27 record (.740 winning percentage), four NCAA Tournament appearances, and four Atlantic Sun Tournament titles. She was three-time Atlantic Sun Coach of the Year.

In 2016 she became the women's tennis program head coach at the University of Oklahoma.

== ITF finals ==
=== Singles: 2 (1–1) ===
Legend $100,000 tournaments $75,000 tournaments $50,000 tournaments $25,000 tournaments $15,000 tournaments $10,000 tournaments	Finals by surface Hard (1–1) Clay (0–0) Grass (0–0) Carpet (0–0)

Outcome	No.	Date	Tournament	Surface	Opponent	Score
Winner	1.	July 25, 2006	Evansville, United States	Hard	(United States) Lauren Albanese	2–6, 6–2, 6–1
Runner-up	2.	January 13, 2008	St. Leo, United States	Hard	(Russia) Anastasia Pivovarova	4–6, 0–6

=== Doubles: 2 (2–0) ===
$100,000 tournaments
$75,000 tournaments
$50,000 tournaments
$25,000 tournaments
$10,000 tournaments

Outcome	No.	Date	Tournament	Surface	Partner	Opponents in the final	Score
Winner	1.	May 25, 2008	Landisville, United States	Hard	(Canada) Heidi El Tabakh	(Switzerland) Stefania Boffa (United Kingdom) Anna Fitzpatrick	6–3, 7–6^{(7–3)}
Winner	2.	November 18, 2008	Puebla, Mexico	Hard	(United States) Megan Moulton-Levy	(Bolivia) María Fernanda Álvarez Terán (Argentina) Veronica Spiegel	6–2, 6–4

== See also ==
- List of select Jewish tennis players
