= Delaware Smash =

- Founded: 1987 (moved to Delaware in 1996)
- Folded: January 30, 2009
- League: World TeamTennis
- Team history: New Jersey Stars; 1987–1995; Delaware Smash; 1996–2008
- Based in: Wilmington, Delaware
- Stadium: DuPont Country Club
- Colors: Red and Black
- Head coach: Mariaan de Swardt
- Championships: 1994, 1995 (as New Jersey Stars); 2003 (as Delaware Smash)

The Delaware Smash was a World TeamTennis (WTT) team that was founded in 1987 as the New Jersey Stars. The team moved to Delaware in 1996, and changed its name to the Smash. The franchise won three WTT championships—in 1994 and 1995, as the Stars and in 2003, as the Smash. The franchise folded after the 2008 season.

== Team history ==
=== Inaugural season ===
New Jersey Stars logo

The Stars were founded in 1987, by commercial real estate developer Larry Rosenthal. They played their home matches at the Somerset Hilton in Franklin Township, Somerset County, New Jersey in a new stadium which was built for the team and had a seating capacity of 1,200. Rosenthal chose to put the team in Central Jersey instead of New York City, because he believed Somerset County was a hotbed for tennis enthusiasts, and said, "We know we have a minimum of 600 to 700 spectators for each home match." The Stars' mascot was a wizard that put a hex on the opposing team. Rosenthal also hired male dancers who usually performed on ladies' night at the Somerset Hilton lounge to wear skimpy costumes and heckle female opposing players.

The first match in Stars history was on July 11, 1987, a 24–21 loss on the road against the Miami Beach Breakers. The team's first home match was also a loss to the Breakers, 24–21, on July 15, 1987. The 1987 Stars featured JoAnne Russell, Molly Van Nostrand, Hank Pfister and player-coach Colin Dibley. The Stars were winless in their inaugural season, losing all 14 of their matches.

=== A trip to the TeamTennis Final ===
The Stars returned in 1988, with a completely new lineup and vastly improved results. Player-coach Peter Fleming led Jenny Byrne, Belinda Cordwell, Matt Mitchell and Chip Hooper to a record of 9 wins and 5 losses and an appearance in the TeamTennis Final. The Stars' regular-season record was good for third place in the league and put them in the TeamTennis Semifinals against the South Florida Breakers. Byrne and Cordwell were a formidable pair in women's doubles, winning 57% of their regular-season games.

The semifinal match was originally scheduled for August 2. However, TeamTennis granted the Breakers' request to push the match back by a day, because South Florida had its final two regular-season matches on the previous two days and wanted an extra day to prepare for the Stars. With the Breakers winning those final two matches, they finished 10–4, one match ahead of the Stars and hosted the semifinal match at Deer Creek Tennis Resort in Deerfield Beach, Florida. The Stars dominated the match from start to finish and won all five sets on their way to a 30–15 victory. Fleming and Hooper opened the match with a 6–2 set win over Horacio de la Peña and 1988 TeamTennis Male Most Valuable Player Blaine Willenborg in men's doubles. Hooper followed by taking the men's singles set, 6–4, over de la Peña. Byrne and Corwell took care of Susan Mascarin and Heather Ludloff in women's doubles, 6–3, and Byrne dominated Mascarin in the singles, 6–1. The final set of mixed doubles went to a tiebreaker, which was won, 5–3, by Fleming and Byrne over Willenborg and Ludloff. The Stars played the match under protest following the league's decision to postpone it by a day. Stars owner Larry Rosenthal threatened to sue TeamTennis if his team had lost. After the match, he said, "Even with seven days rest, we were still going to beat the heck out of them tonight."

On August 7, 1988, the Stars faced the defending champion Charlotte Heat in the TeamTennis Final in Charlotte, North Carolina. In a close match, the Heat prevailed, 27–22.

=== Move to Chatham ===
In 1989, the Stars relocated to a 1,200-seat grandstand court at the Center Court Tennis Club in Chatham Borough, New Jersey.

=== Move to Delaware ===
On March 1, 1996, the two-time defending champion Stars announced that the team had been purchased by Billie Jean King and International Management Group and would relocate to the Bob Carpenter Center on the campus of the University of Delaware in Newark for the 1996 season. IMG had previously owned the Florida Twist, which folded after the 1995 season.

Home matches for the club were played at the DuPont Country Club in Wilmington, Delaware in 1998 and 2000 to 2003, the University of Delaware's Bob Carpenter Center in 1999, and then at courts near AstraZeneca headquarters (2004–2006) before returning to the country club in 2007.

During the initial years the Smash played at DuPont Country Club, the matches were played on har-tru club courts. The team transitioned to hard courts when it moved to AstraZeneca, and continued to play on hard courts when it returned to DuPont CC. In order to be in compliance with WTT regulations, a temporary hard court was laid during the summer on two of the courts at the country club.

On January 30, 2009 the owner announced that the Smash would be closing down due to lack of sponsorship.

== Final season squad ==
- (South Africa) Mariaan de Swardt, Head Coach
- (United States) Madison Brengle
- (United States) Ryler DeHeart
- (United States) Christina Fusano
- (South Africa) Chris Haggard
- (South Africa) Liezel Huber

== See also ==
- World TeamTennis
- List of professional sports teams in Delaware
- Marion Jessup
- Margaret Osborne duPont
