= List of former professional sports teams in Houston =

- American football
  - Oilers, 1960–97 (AFL/NFL) – Now the Tennessee Titans, the team relocated to Memphis and later to Nashville, Tennessee.
  - Texans, 1974–75 (WFL) – The team relocated to Shreveport, Louisiana.
  - Herricanes, 1976–79 (NWFL)
  - Gamblers, 1984–85 (USFL)
  - Terror/Thunderbears, 1996–2001 (AFL)
  - Gunners, 1998–2014 (NPSFL/APSFL)
  - Outlaws, 1999 (RFL)
  - Marshals, 2000 (SFL)
  - Copperheads, 2006–2008 (NIFL/AF2)
  - Wild Riders, 2007 (NIFL)
  - Ruff Riders, 2007–08 (Intense Football League) – The team relocated to Abilene.
  - Texas Cyclones, 2008–10 (NWFA/WFA/IWFL)
  - Lightning, 2009–2010 (SIFL)
  - Stallions, 2010–2012 (SIFL/LSFL)
  - Power, 2010–2023 (WFA)
  - Lady Oilers, 2011–2013 (WAFL)
  - Wildcats, 2016–2017 (USWFL)
  - Roughnecks, 2018–2024 (XFL)
  - Gamblers/Roughnecks, 2021–2026 (United States Football League/UFL)
  - Jets, 2021–2022 (AFA)
  - Mambas, 2022–2025 (WNFC)
- Baseball
  - Buffaloes (Buffs), 1888–1961 (Texas League, American Association), reorganized and relocated to Oklahoma City after their buyout by the Houston Astros. The team still exists as the Oklahoma City Comets.
  - Eagles, 1949-c.1950s (Negro league baseball team, remnants of legendary Newark Eagles)
  - Apollos, 2002–2021 (Big States League/Pecos League/AAIPB)
  - Toros, 2007–2009 (CBL)
  - Strykers, 2012—2016 (TCL)
- Basketball
  - Ada Oilers, 1952–57 (Amateur Athletic Association/NIBL)
  - Mavericks, 1967–69 (ABA)
  - Angels, 1978–1980 (Women's Professional Basketball League)
  - Shamrocks, 1984 (WABA)
  - Comets, 1997–2008 (WNBA)
  - Flames, 2000 (WSBL)
  - Stealth, 2002–2004 (NWBA)
  - Undertakers/Takers/Red Storm, 2006–2012 (ABA)
  - Asteroids, 2010 (GPBL 2)
  - Legends, 2012-2015 (ABA)
  - Assault, 2013–2015 (ABA)
  - Strikers, 2013–2014 (IBL)
  - Inferno, 2013–2015 (BBA)
  - Bandits, 2015 (ABA)
  - Wolverines, 2017 (NABL)
  - Galaxy, 2017–20 (WMLBA)
  - Toros, 2018 (NABL)
  - Ballers, 2018–19 (JBA)
  - Push, 2021 (TBL)
  - Imperials, 2022 (TBL)
  - Warriors, 2023 (TBL)
- Hockey
  - Skippers, 1946–47 (USHL)
  - Huskies, 1947–48 (USHL)
  - Apollos, 1965–69; 1979–81 (CHL)
  - Aeros, 1972–78 (WHA)
  - Aeros, 1994–2013 (IHL/AHL) – Now the Iowa Wild, the team relocated to Des Moines, Iowa.
  - Blast, 2001–02 (Gulf Coast Hockey League)
  - Imperials, 2013–2016 (NA3HL)
- Soccer
  - Stars, 1967–68 (USA/NASL)
  - Hurricane, 1978–80 (NASL)
  - Summit, 1978–80 (MISL)
  - Dynamos, 1983–91 (USL/LSSA)
  - Express, 1988–90 (SISL)
  - Alianza, 1988–91 (LSSA)
  - Hotshots, 1994–97 (CISL)
  - Force, 1995 (USL-2)
  - Hurricanes, 1996–2000 (USL-2)
  - Hotshots, 1999–2000 (WISL)
  - Tornados, 1999–2001 (W-League)
  - Toros, 2002–2003 (PDL)
  - Stars, 2003-2005 (WPSL)
  - Tornadoes, 2003 (WPSL)
  - Leones, 2007–2010 (PDL)
  - South Select, 2007–2016 (WPSL)
  - Dutch Lions, 2011–2019 (NPSL)
  - Aces, 2012–2024 (WPSL/UWS)
  - Hurricanes FC, 2012–2013 (NPSL)
  - Regals SCA, 2013; 2015–2018 (NPSL)
  - Hotshots, 2015–2017 (PASL)
  - 1895 FC/CF10 HFC, 2017–2025 (NPSL)
  - Bolt FC, 2024–2025 (MASL3)
- Team tennis
  - E-Z Riders, 1974 (World Team Tennis)
  - Astro-Knots, 1982–1983 (TeamTennis)
  - Wranglers, 2005–2007 (World TeamTennis)
- Cricket
  - Arrow Heads, 2004 (Pro Cricket)
- Softball
  - Thunder, 2004–2006 (National Pro Fastpitch)
  - Scrap Yard Dawgs, 2016–2017 (National Pro Fastpitch)
- Esports
  - Outlaws, 2017–2023 (Overwatch League)
- Rugby union
  - SaberCats, 2017–2025 (Major League Rugby)
- Drum and bugle corps
  - Guardians, 2015–2022 (DCI)
