= 2008 New York Sportimes season =

- Conference: 2nd Eastern

Record
- 2008 record: 10 wins, 4 losses
- Home record: 7 wins, 0 losses
- Road record: 3 wins, 4 losses
- Games won–lost: 272–258

Team info
- Owner(s): Sportime Clubs et al
- President/CEO: Claude Okin
- General manager: Ann Marie Gaudio
- Coach: Dustin Taylor
- Captain: John McEnroe
- Stadium: Sportime Stadium at Harbor Island (capacity: 1,843)

The 2008 New York Sportimes season was the ninth season of the franchise in World TeamTennis (WTT).

The Sportimes had 10 wins and 4 losses and finished second in the Eastern Conference, missing the conference championship by losing a standings tiebreaker to the New York Buzz. The Sportimes lost to the Buzz, 25–17 in overtime, in the WTT Semifinals.

== Season recap ==
=== Draft ===
The Sportimes protected John McEnroe in the Marquee Player Draft. In the Roster Player Draft, the Sportimes had the fourth pick in each round. They protected Jesse Witten and Hana Šromová in the second and third rounds, respectively. The Sportimes left Ashley Harkleroad unprotected in the first round and instead chose Bethanie Mattek. Brian Wilson was taken in the fourth round, leaving Mirko Pehar unprotected. The team did not select any roster-exempt players. Dustin Taylor replaced Chuck Adams as the head coach.

=== Luzhanska signed to substitute for Mattek ===
With Bethanie Mattek's availability in doubt, because she and her partner Sania Mirza reached the quarterfinals of the ladies' doubles tournament at Wimbedon, the Sportimes signed Tetiana Luzhanska as a substitute player to replace her. The team announced on July 2, 2008, that, with Mattek eliminated from Wimbledon the previous day, Luzhanska would play only in the season-opening match, and Mattek would be available beginning with the second match of the season on July 7.

=== A brilliant start ===
The Sportimes started their season with a four-match homestand that pitted them against the Boston Lobsters in the opener on July 3, 2008. The Sportimes found themselves trailing, 12–9, after three sets. Jesse Witten started the comeback with a 5–3 men's singles set win over Jan-Michael Gambill. Hana Šromová and Brian Wilson took the final set of mixed doubles, 5–3, and the Sportimes squeezed out a 19–18 victory.

After three days off, the Sportimes returned to the court to host the Philadelphia Freedoms. Again, the Sportimes dug themselves a hole, trailing, 13–11, after three sets. Bethanie Mattek, making her Sportimes debut, dominated Audra Cohen, 5–0, in the women's singles set to give New York a 16–13 lead. After Mattek and Wilson dropped a tiebreaker in the fifth set of mixed doubles, they won the first game of overtime to give the Sportimes a 21–18 win.

The following evening, the Sportimes built a 15–10 lead over the New York Buzz after three sets. Wilson and Witten opened the match with a 5–3 set win in men's doubles. Mattek and Šromová followed by taking a tiebreaker in women's doubles. Mattek and Wilson won the mixed doubles set, 5–3. The Buzz answered with Yaroslava Shvedova taking the women's singles set from Mattek, 5–3, and Nathan Healey topping Witten in men's singles by the same score. With the Sportimes clinging to a 21–20 lead, Witten won the first game of overtime over Healey to secure a 22–20 triumph.

On July 10, 2008, the Sportimes welcomed Serena Williams and the expansion Washington Kastles to Harbor Island. Wilson and Witten won the opening set of men's doubles in a tiebreaker, and Williams and Mashona Washington did the same in women's doubles to tie the match at 9 all. In the third set, Williams teamed with Justin Gimelstob for a 5–2 mixed doubles set win over Mattek and Wilson that gave the Kastles a 14–11 lead. Facing Williams in women's singles, Mattek built a 3–1 lead, before the Kastles inserted Washington as a substitute. Mattek closed out the set win, 5–2, to tie the match at 16 all. In the final set of men's singles, Witten won a tiebreaker over Scott Oudsema to clinch a 21–20 victory for the Sportimes and complete their perfect homestand with a record of 4 wins and 0 losses.

The following evening, the Sportimes faced their first challenge on the road, when they visited the Delaware Smash. Witten opened the match by winning a tiebreaker in men's singles. Mattek followed with a 5–0 set win over Madison Brengle in women's singles. After the Smash won the men's doubles set in a tiebreaker, Mattek and Šromová earned a 5–3 set win in women's doubles that gave the Sportimes a 19–12 lead. A 5–2 mixed doubles set win by Liezel Huber and Chris Haggard cut the lead to 21–17, but Mattek and Wilson responded by winning the first game of overtime to secure a 22–17 win.

The Sportimes returned home on July 12, 2008, to face the Freedoms for the second time. The Freedoms won the first two sets to build a 10–5 lead. Witten won the men's singles set, 5–2, to cut the lead to 12–10. After the Freedoms won the fourth set of mixed doubles, the Sportimes found themselves trailing, 17–13. Mattek took on Lisa Raymond in women's singles and won the set, 5–1, to tie the match at 18 all and send it to a super tiebreaker. Mattek completed the comeback by taking the super tiebreaker from Raymond, 7–5. The 19–18 victory improved the Sportimes' record to 6 wins and 0 losses and left them as one of only two undefeated teams in WTT.

=== Mattek departs, and the Sportimes struggle ===
Without any formal announcement by the Sportimes or WTT, Bethanie Mattek vanished from the team after its sixth match. Mattek had played a key role in the early-season success of the Sportimes, who won all five matches in which she appeared. After the WTT season ended, Mattek was still featured prominently on the Sportimes' website home page. She was apparently not injured, since she appeared in the LA Women's Tennis Championships, which opened on July 21, before the WTT season had concluded. Mattek was replaced for the Sportimes' July 13 road match against the Boston Lobsters by Robin Stephenson, who had appeared against them earlier in the season as a member of the Philadelphia Freedoms but had been released.

The Sportimes opened a three-match road trip by falling behind the Lobsters, 10–3, after two sets. Set tiebreaker wins by Jesse Witten in men's singles and Hana Šromová in women's singles cut the deficit to 18–13. But the Lobsters won a tiebreaker in the final set of mixed doubles to put away a 23–17 victory and hand the Sportimes their first loss of the season.

On July 14, 2008, the Sportimes signed Milagros Sequera with the apparent intention of replacing Mattek for the remainder of the season. Her first match with the team came that same day on the road against the Freedoms, and John McEnroe also made his season debut in that match. The Freedoms opened the match with a 5–1 set win over McEnroe and Brian Wilson in men's doubles. Sequera teamed with Šromová to win a tiebreaker in the women's doubles set. McEnroe managed to take a men's singles tiebreaker over Alex Bogomolov Jr. that cut the Freedoms' lead to 13–11. The Sportimes pushed in front, when Sequera won the women's singles set, 5–1. Sequera then teamed with Wilson for a 5–1 set win in mixed doubles that clinched a 21–15 win for the Sportimes.

The next evening, the Sportimes built an early 10–2 lead in the finale of their road trip against the Washington Kastles. They were led by Sequera who teamed with Wilson for a 5–1 set win in the opening set of mixed doubles and followed by taking the women's singles set by the same score. However, the Kastles won the next three sets and tied the match at 17 all, when Mashona Washington and Sacha Jones took the final set of women's doubles from Sequera and Šromová, 5–1. Washington and Jones won the super tiebreaker, 7–5, to give the Kastles an 18–17 victory.

After an off day, the Sportimes returned to Harbor Island for the final two home matches on their schedule. They won the first four sets of their match against the Springfield Lasers, the first three in tiebreakers, to take a 20–14 lead. After dropping the final set of mixed doubles, Sequera and Wilson won the first game of overtime to secure a 24–19 victory.

The following evening, the Sportimes hosted the Newport Beach Breakers. After dropping the opening set of men's doubles in a tiebreaker, the Sportimes took a 9–5 lead, when Sequera and Šromová dominated Michaela Paštiková and Rebecca Bernhard in women's doubles, 5–0. Sequera later teamed with Wilson for a 5–3 set win in the fourth set of mixed doubles and closed out a 22–14 win by taking the final set of women's singles, 5–1. The victory gave the Sportimes a perfect record of 7 wins and 0 losses at home and improved their overall record to 9 wins and 2 losses with three road matches to play to close the regular season.

On July 22, 2008, the Sportimes opened their three-match road trip to close the season against the second-place New York Buzz. The Sportimes' magic number for clinching the Eastern Conference championship stood at 2. A victory in this match would not only clinch the conference title but also no worse than the number 2 seed in the WTT playoffs. While the Sportimes enjoyed a day off the previous day, they clinched a playoff berth and a bye to the WTT semifinals when the Kansas City Explorers defeated the Kastles, 24–13. On this day, however, the Sportimes struggled. They dropped the first two sets and fell behind, 10–3. Witten won the third set of men's singles to cut the deficit to 13–8. But the Buzz cruised to easy set wins in the fourth and fifth sets on their way to a 23–11 victory. The dominant win assured the Buzz of the standings tiebreaker edge against the Sportimes, since the teams had split their two regular season matches, but the Buzz had a 43–33 advantage in games won in those matches.

After a win over the Breakers, the Sportimes' magic number for winning the Eastern Conference title was reduced to 1. Playing on the West Coast in the Pacific Time Zone against the defending champion Sacramento Capitals on the final day of the regular season, the Sportimes and Capitals closed the WTT regular season in a match with myriad implications. A Capitals victory would give them the number 4 seed in the WTT playoffs, clinch a playoff berth for the Lobsters, eliminate the Freedoms and give the Buzz the Eastern Conference championship and the number 2 seed. A Sportimes win would give them the Eastern Conference title and the number 2 seed, clinch a playoff berth for the Freedoms, eliminate the Lobsters, drop the Buzz to the number 3 seed and drop the Capitals to the number 5 seed. Witten opened the match with a 5–3 set win in men's singles. The Capitals won the next two sets to take a 13–10 lead. Sequera continued to be reliable for the Sportimes and won the fourth set of women's singles, 5–2, to tie the match at 15 all. The final set of men's doubles came down to a tiebreaker, and Sam Warburg and Eric Butorac squeezed out the victory over Wilson and Witten to give the Capitals a 20–19 triumph. Thus, the Sportimes' chances of winning the Eastern Conference title vanished on what was literally the final point played of the WTT regular season, after they had spent virtually the entire season as frontrunners.

=== Battle for New York in WTT Semifinals ===
The Sportimes were the overall number 3 seed which matched them with the number 2 seed, the New York Buzz, in the WTT Semifinals on July 26, at Allstate Stadium at Westfield Galleria at Roseville in Roseville, California, the site of WTT's 2008 Championship Weekend. Just hours before the match, WTT announced that Milagros Sequera had been injured and would be unavailable for the postseason. In her place, the Sportimes re-signed Ashley Harkleroad.

In the first ever postseason meeting between the two New York clubs, the Buzz dominated the match winning the first four sets. Nathan Healey and Yaroslava Shvedova opened the match with a 5–3 set win against John McEnroe and Hana Šromová in mixed doubles. Shvedova followed with a 5–2 women's singles win over Harkleroad. Healy took care of Jesse Witten, 5–2, in men's singles. Gabriela Navrátilová and Shvedova needed a tiebreaker to beat Harkleroad and Šromová, 5–4, and give the Buzz a 20–11 lead heading to the final set. McEnroe and Witten won a tiebreaker over Patrick Briaud and Healy in men's doubles to force overtime with the Buzz leading 24–16. Briaud and Healy won the second game of overtime to give the Buzz a 25–17 victory and end the Sportimes' season.

== Event chronology ==
- March 19, 2008: The Sportimes protected John McEnroe at the WTT Marquee Player Draft.
- April 1, 2008: The Sportimes protected Jesse Witten and Hana Šromová and selected Bethanie Mattek and Brian Wilson at the WTT Roster Player Draft. The Sportimes left Ashley Harkleroad and Mirko Pehar unprotected.
- July 2, 2008: The Sportimes signed Tetiana Luzhanska as a substitute player.
- July 13, 2008: The Sportimes signed Robin Stephenson, who had appeared against them earlier in the season for the Philadelphia Freedoms and been released, as a substitute player.
- July 14, 2008: The Sportimes signed Milagros Sequera as a substitute player.
- July 19, 2008: With a record of 9 wins and 2 losses, the Sportimes clinched playoff berth and a bye to the WTT Semifinals, when the Kansas City Explorers defeated the Washington Kastles, 24–13.
- July 14, 2008: The Sportimes re-signed Ashley Harkleroad as a substitute player.
- July 26, 2008: The Sportimes lost to the New York Buzz, 25–17 in overtime, in the WTT Semifinals.

== Draft picks ==
With 6 wins and 8 losses, the Sportimes had the fifth worst record in WTT in 2007. Since the Houston Wranglers folded after the 2007 season, the Sportimes selected fourth in each round of the WTT's two drafts.

=== Marquee player draft ===
The Sportimes protected John McEnroe in the first round of the WTT Marquee Player Draft and did not make a second-round selection.

=== Roster player draft ===
The league conducted its 2008 Roster Player Draft on April 1, in Miami, Florida. The selections made by the Sportimes are shown in the table below.

Round	No.	Overall	Player chosen	Prot?
1	4	4	(United States) Bethanie Mattek	N
2	4	15	(United States) Jesse Witten	Y
3	4	26	(Czech Republic) Hana Šromová	Y
4	4	37	(United States) Brian Wilson	N

The Sportimes did not select any roster-exempt players.

== Match log ==
=== Regular season ===
Legend
Sportimes Win	Sportimes Loss
Home team in CAPS

Match	Date	Venue and location	Result and details	Record
1	July 3	Sportime Stadium at Harbor Island; Mamaroneck, New York	NEW YORK SPORTIMES 19, Boston Lobsters 18 * MD: Brian Wilson/Jesse Witten (Sportimes) 5, Jan-Michael Gambill/Amir Hadad (Lobsters) 2 * WD: Raquel Kops-Jones/Marie-Ève Pelletier (Lobsters) 5, Tetiana Luzhanska/Hana Šromová (Sportimes) 2 * WS: Marie-Ève Pelletier (Lobsters) 5, Tetiana Luzhanska (Sportimes) 2 * MS: Jesse Witten (Sportimes) 5, Jan-Michael Gambill (Lobsters) 3 * XD: Hana Šromová/Brian Wilson (Sportimes) 5, Raquel Kops-Jones/Amir Hadad (Lobsters) 3	1–0
2	July 7	Sportime Stadium at Harbor Island; Mamaroneck, New York	NEW YORK SPORTIMES 21, Philadelphia Freedoms 18 (overtime) * MD: Brian Wilson/Jesse Witten (Sportimes) 5, Alex Bogomolov Jr./Travis Parrott (Freedoms) 3 * WD: Audra Cohen/Robin Stephenson (Freedoms) 5, Bethanie Mattek/Hana Šromová (Sportimes) 3 * MS: Alex Bogomolov Jr. (Freedoms) 5, Jesse Witten (Sportimes) 3 * WS: Bethanie Mattek (Sportimes) 5, Audra Cohen (Freedoms) 0 * XD: Robin Stephenson/Travis Parrott (Freedoms) 5, Bethanie Mattek/Brian Wilson (Sportimes) 4 *** Robin Stephenson substituted for Audra Cohen at 4–4 * OT - XD: Bethanie Mattek/Brian Wilson (Sportimes) 1, Robin Stephenson/Travis Parrott (Freedoms) 0	2–0
3	July 8	Sportime Stadium at Harbor Island; Mamaroneck, New York	NEW YORK SPORTIMES 22, New York Buzz 20 (overtime) * MD: Brian Wilson/Jesse Witten (Sportimes) 5, Patrick Briaud/Nathan Healey (Buzz) 3 * WD: Bethanie Mattek/Hana Šromová (Sportimes) 5, Gabriela Navrátilová/Yaroslava Shvedova (Buzz) 4 * XD: Bethanie Mattek/Brian Wilson (Sportimes) 5, Yaroslava Shvedova/Nathan Healey (Buzz) 3 * WS: Yaroslava Shvedova (Buzz) 5, Bethanie Mattek (Sportimes) 3 * MS: Nathan Healey (Buzz) 5, Jesse Witten (Sportimes) 3 * OT - MS: Jesse Witten (Sportimes) 1, Nathan Healey (Buzz) 0	3–0
4	July 10	Sportime Stadium at Harbor Island; Mamaroneck, New York	NEW YORK SPORTIMES 21, Washington Kastles 20 * MD: Brian Wilson/Jesse Witten (Sportimes) 5, Scott Oudsema/Justin Gimelstob (Kastles) 4 * WD: Mashona Washington/Serena Williams (Kastles) 5, Bethanie Mattek/Hana Šromová (Sportimes) 4 * XD: Serena Williams/Justin Gimelstob (Kastles) 5, Bethanie Mattek/Brian Wilson (Sportimes) 2 * WS: Bethanie Mattek (Sportimes) 5, Mashona Washington (Kastles) 2 *** Mashona Washington substituted for Serena Williams at 1–3 * MS: Jesse Witten (Sportimes) 5, Scott Oudsema (Kastles) 4	4–0
5	July 11	DuPont Country Club; Brandywine Hundred, Delaware	New York Sportimes 22, DELAWARE SMASH 17 (overtime) * MS: Jesse Witten (Sportimes) 5, Ryler DeHeart (Smash) 4 * WS: Bethanie Mattek (Sportimes) 5, Madison Brengle (Smash) 0 * MD: Chris Haggard/Ryler DeHeart (Smash) 5, Brian Wilson/Jesse Witten (Sportimes) 4 * WD: Bethanie Mattek/Hana Šromová (Sportimes) 5, Liezel Huber/Christina Fusano (Smash) 3 *** Christina Fusano substituted for Madison Brengle at 1–2 * XD: Liezel Huber/Chris Haggard (Smash) 5, Bethanie Mattek/Brian Wilson (Sportimes) 2 * OT - XD: Bethanie Mattek/Brian Wilson (Sportimes) 1, Liezel Huber/Chris Haggard (Smash) 0	5–0
6	July 12	Sportime Stadium at Harbor Island; Mamaroneck, New York	NEW YORK SPORTIMES 19, Philadelphia Freedoms 18 (super tiebreaker, 7–5) * MD: Alex Bogomolov Jr./Travis Parrott (Freedoms) 5, Brian Wilson/Jesse Witten (Sportimes) 1 * WD: Lisa Raymond/Audra Cohen (Freedoms) 5, Bethanie Mattek/Hana Šromová (Sportimes) 4 * MS: Jesse Witten (Sportimes) 5, Alex Bogomolov Jr. (Freedoms) 2 * XD: Lisa Raymond/Travis Parrott (Freedoms) 5, Bethanie Mattek/Brian Wilson (Sportimes) 3 * WS: Bethanie Mattek (Sportimes) 5, Lisa Raymond (Freedoms) 1 * STB - WS: Bethanie Mattek (Sportimes) 7, Lisa Raymond (Freedoms) 5	6–0
7	July 13	Ferncroft Country Club; Middleton, Massachusetts	BOSTON LOBSTERS 23, New York Sportimes 17 * MD: Amir Hadad/Jan-Michael Gambill (Lobsters) 5, Brian Wilson/Jesse Witten (Sportimes) 2 * WD: Raquel Kops-Jones/Marie-Ève Pelletier (Lobsters) 5, Hana Šromová/Robin Stephenson (Sportimes) 1 * MS: Jesse Witten (Sportimes) 5, Jan-Michael Gambill (Lobsters) 4 * WS: Hana Šromová (Sportimes) 5, Marie-Ève Pelletier (Lobsters) 4 * XD: Raquel Kops-Jones/Amir Hadad (Lobsters) 5, Robin Stephenson/Brian Wilson (Sportimes) 4 *** Robin Stephenson substituted for Hana Šromová at 0–1	6–1
8	July 14	King of Prussia Mall; Upper Merion Township, Pennsylvania	New York Sportimes 21, PHILADELPHIA FREEDOMS 15 * MD: Alex Bogomolov Jr./Travis Parrott (Freedoms) 5, John McEnroe/Brian Wilson (Sportimes) 1 * WD: Milagros Sequera/Hana Šromová (Sportimes) 5, Lisa Raymond/Audra Cohen (Freedoms) 4 * MS: John McEnroe (Sportimes) 5, Alex Bogomolov Jr. (Freedoms) 4 * WS: Milagros Sequera (Sportimes) 5, Lisa Raymond (Freedoms) 1 *** Lisa Raymond substituted for Audra Cohen at 0–3 * XD: Milagros Sequera/Brian Wilson (Sportimes) 5, Lisa Raymond/Travis Parrott (Freedoms) 1	7–1
9	July 15	Kastles Stadium at CityCenterDC; Washington, District of Columbia	WASHINGTON KASTLES 18, New York Sportimes 17 (super tiebreaker, 7–5) * XD: Milagros Sequera/Brian Wilson (Sportimes) 5, Mashona Washington/Justin Gimelstob (Kastles) 1 * WS: Milagros Sequera (Sportimes) 5, Mashona Washington (Kastles) 1 * MS: Scott Oudsema (Kastles) 5, John McEnroe (Sportimes) 2 * MD: Scott Oudsema/Justin Gimelstob (Kastles) 5, Brian Wilson/John McEnroe (Sportimes) 4 * WD: Mashona Washington/Sacha Jones (Kastles) 5, Milagros Sequera/Hana Šromová (Sportimes) 1 * STB - WD: Mashona Washington/Sacha Jones (Kastles) 7, Milagros Sequera/Hana Šromová (Sportimes) 5	7–2
10	July 17	Sportime Stadium at Harbor Island; Mamaroneck, New York	NEW YORK SPORTIMES 24, Springfield Lasers 19 (overtime) * MD: Brian Wilson/Jesse Witten (Sportimes) 5, Glenn Weiner/Todd Perry (Lasers) 4 * WD: Milagros Sequera/Hana Šromová (Sportimes) 5, Shenay Perry/Chanelle Scheepers (Lasers) 4 * MS: Jesse Witten (Sportimes) 5, Glenn Weiner (Lasers) 4 * WD: Milagros Sequera (Sportimes) 5, Chanelle Scheepers (Lasers) 2 * XD: Shenay Perry/Todd Perry (Lasers) 5, Milagros Sequera/Brian Wilson (Sportimes) 3 * OT - XD: Milagros Sequera/Brian Wilson (Sportimes) 1, Shenay Perry/Todd Perry (Lasers) 0	8–2
11	July 18	Sportime Stadium at Harbor Island; Mamaroneck, New York	NEW YORK SPORTIMES 22, Newport Beach Breakers 14 * MD: Ramón Delgado/Kaes Van't Hof (Breakers) 5, Brian Wilson/Jesse Witten (Sportimes) 4 * WD: Milagros Sequera/Hana Šromová (Sportimes) 5, Michaela Paštiková/Rebecca Bernhard (Breakers) 0 * MS: Ramón Delgado (Breakers) 5, Jesse Witten (Sportimes) 3 * XD: Milagros Sequera/Brian Wilson (Sportimes) 5, Michaela Paštiková/Kaes Van't Hof (Breakers) 3 * WS: Milagros Sequera (Sportimes) 5, Michaela Paštiková (Breakers) 1	9–2
12	July 20	Washington Avenue Armory Sports and Convention Arena; Albany, New York	NEW YORK BUZZ 23, New York Sportimes 11 * WD: Gabriela Navrátilová/Yaroslava Shvedova (Buzz) 5, Milagros Sequera/Hana Šromová (Sportimes) 0 * XD: Yaroslava Shvedova/Nathan Healey (Buzz) 5, Milagros Sequera/Brian Wilson (Sportimes) 3 * MS: Jesse Witten (Sportimes) 5, Nathan Healey (Buzz) 3 * WS: Yaroslava Shvedova (Buzz) 5, Hana Šromová (Sportimes) 1 *** Hana Šromová substituted for Milagros Sequera at 0–1 * MD: Patrick Briaud/Nathan Healey (Buzz) 5, Brian Wilson/Jesse Witten (Sportimes) 2	9–3
13	July 22	Breakers Stadium at the Newport Beach Country Club; Newport Beach, California	New York Sportimes 17, NEWPORT BEACH BREAKERS 15 (overtime) * WD: Milagros Sequera/Hana Šromová (Sportimes) 5, Lilia Osterloh/Michaela Paštiková (Breakers) 1 * XD: Milagros Sequera/John McEnroe (Sportimes) 5, Michaela Paštiková/Kaes Van't Hof (Breakers) 2 * MD: Ramón Delgado/Kaes Van't Hof (Breakers) 5, John McEnroe/Jesse Witten (Sportimes) 0 * WS: Milagros Sequera (Sportimes) 5, Lilia Osterloh (Breakers) 2 * MS: Ramón Delgado (Breakers) 5, Jesse Witten (Sportimes) 1 * OT - MS: Jesse Witten (Sportimes) 1, Ramón Delgado (Breakers) 0	10–3
14	July 23	Allstate Stadium at Westfield Galleria at Roseville; Roseville, California	SACRAMENTO CAPITALS 20, New York Sportimes 19 * MS: Jesse Witten (Sportimes) 5, Sam Warburg (Capitals) 3 * WD: Elena Likhovtseva/Tamaryn Hendler (Capitals) 5, Milagros Sequera/Hana Šromová (Sportimes) 3 * XD: Elena Likhovtseva/Eric Butorac (Capitals) 5, Milagros Sequera/Jesse Witten (Sportimes) 2 *** Jesse Witten substituted for Brian Wilson at 1–4 * WS: Milagros Sequera (Sportimes) 5, Tamaryn Hendler (Capitals) 2 * MD: Sam Warburg/Eric Butorac (Capitals) 5, Brian Wilson/Jesse Witten (Sportimes) 4	10–4

=== Playoffs ===
Legend
Sportimes Win	Sportimes Loss
Home team in CAPS

World TeamTennis Semifinals

Date	Venue and location	Result and details
July 26	Allstate Stadium at Westfield Galleria at Roseville; Roseville, California	NEW YORK BUZZ 25, New York Sportimes 17 (overtime) * XD: Yaroslava Shvedova/Nathan Healey (Buzz) 5, Hana Šromová/John McEnroe (Sportimes) 3 * WS: Yaroslava Shvedova (Buzz) 5, Ashley Harkleroad (Sportimes) 2 * MS: Nathan Healey (Buzz) 5, Jesse Witten (Sportimes) 2 * WD: Gabriela Navrátilová/Yaroslava Shvedova (Buzz) 5, Ashley Harkleroad/Hana Šromová (Sportimes) 4 * MD: John McEnroe/Jesse Witten (Sportimes) 5, Patrick Briaud/Nathan Healey (Buzz) 4 * OT - MD: Patrick Briaud/Nathan Healey (Buzz) 1, John McEnroe/Jesse Witten (Sportimes) 1

== Team personnel ==
=== Players and coaches ===
- (United States) Dustin Taylor, Coach
- (United States) Ashley Harkleroad (Note: Player appeared in fewer than three matches during the season as a substitute player and was not eligible to be protected in the following year's draft.)
- (Ukraine) Tetiana Luzhanska
- (United States) Bethanie Mattek (Note: Player left the team during the regular season for undisclosed reasons. It is not clear whether her departure was excused.)
- (United States) John McEnroe
- (Venezuela) Milagros Sequera
- (Czech Republic) Hana Šromová
- (United States) Robin Stephenson
- (United States) Brian Wilson
- (United States) Jesse Witten

=== Front office ===
- Claude Okin, President
- Ann Marie Gaudio, General Manager

== Statistics ==
Players are listed in order of their game-winning percentage provided they played in at least 40% of the Sportimes' games in that event, which is the WTT minimum for qualification for league leaders in individual statistical categories.

Men's singles - regular season

Player	GP	GW	GL	PCT
Jesse Witten	99	52	47	.525
John McEnroe	16	7	9	.438
Total	115	59	56	.513

Women's singles - regular season

Player	GP	GW	GL	PCT
Milagros Sequera	40	30	10	.750
Bethanie Mattek	32	24	8	.750
Hana Šromová	14	6	8	.429
Tetiana Luzhanska	7	2	5	.286
Total	93	62	31	.667

Men's doubles - regular season

Player	GP	GW	GL	PCT
Brian Wilson	103	47	56	.456
Jesse Witten	93	42	51	.452
John McEnroe	20	5	15	.250
Total	108	47	61	.435

Women's doubles - regular season

Player	GP	GW	GL	PCT
Milagros Sequera	49	24	25	.490
Bethanie Mattek	43	21	22	.488
Hana Šromová	105	48	57	.457
Tetiana Luzhanska	7	2	5	.286
Robin Stephenson	6	1	5	.167
Total	105	48	57	.457

Mixed doubles - regular season

Player	GP	GW	GL	PCT
Milagros Sequera	51	29	22	.569
Brian Wilson	100	50	50	.500
John McEnroe	7	5	2	.714
Hana Šromová	9	5	4	.556
Robin Stephenson	8	4	4	.500
Jesse Witten	2	1	1	.500
Bethanie Mattek	41	18	23	.439
Total	109	56	53	.514

Team totals - regular season

Event	GP	GW	GL	PCT
Men's singles	115	59	56	.513
Women's singles	93	62	31	.667
Men's doubles	108	47	61	.435
Women's doubles	105	48	57	.457
Mixed doubles	109	56	53	.514
Total	530	272	258	.513

Men's singles - playoffs

Player	GP	GW	GL	PCT
Jesse Witten	7	2	5	.286
Total	7	2	5	.286

Women's singles - playoffs

Player	GP	GW	GL	PCT
Ashley Harkleroad	7	2	5	.286
Total	7	2	5	.286

Men's doubles - playoffs

Player	GP	GW	GL	PCT
John McEnroe	11	6	5	.545
Jesse Witten	11	6	5	.545
Total	11	6	5	.545

Women's doubles - playoffs

Player	GP	GW	GL	PCT
Ashley Harkleroad	9	4	5	.444
Hana Šromová	9	4	5	.444
Total	9	4	5	.444

Mixed doubles - playoffs

Player	GP	GW	GL	PCT
John McEnroe	8	3	5	.375
Hana Šromová	8	3	5	.375
Total	8	3	5	.375

Team totals - playoffs

Event	GP	GW	GL	PCT
Men's singles	7	2	5	.286
Women's singles	7	2	5	.286
Men's doubles	11	6	5	.545
Women's doubles	9	4	5	.444
Mixed doubles	8	3	5	.375
Total	42	17	25	.405

Men's singles - all matches

Player	GP	GW	GL	PCT
Jesse Witten	106	54	52	.509
John McEnroe	16	7	9	.438
Total	122	61	61	.500

Women's singles - all matches

Player	GP	GW	GL	PCT
Milagros Sequera	40	30	10	.750
Bethanie Mattek	32	24	8	.750
Hana Šromová	14	6	8	.429
Ashley Harkleroad	7	2	5	.286
Tetiana Luzhanska	7	2	5	.286
Total	100	64	36	.640

Men's doubles - all matches

Player	GP	GW	GL	PCT
Jesse Witten	104	48	56	.462
Brian Wilson	103	47	56	.456
John McEnroe	31	11	20	.355
Total	119	53	66	.445

Women's doubles - all matches

Player	GP	GW	GL	PCT
Milagros Sequera	49	24	25	.490
Bethanie Mattek	43	21	22	.488
Hana Šromová	114	52	62	.456
Ashley Harkleroad	9	4	5	.444
Tetiana Luzhanska	7	2	5	.286
Robin Stephenson	6	1	5	.167
Total	114	52	62	.456

Mixed doubles - all matches

Player	GP	GW	GL	PCT
Milagros Sequera	51	29	22	.569
Brian Wilson	100	50	50	.500
John McEnroe	15	8	7	.533
Robin Stephenson	8	4	4	.500
Jesse Witten	2	1	1	.500
Hana Šromová	17	8	9	.471
Bethanie Mattek	41	18	23	.439
Total	117	59	58	.504

Team totals - all matches

Event	GP	GW	GL	PCT
Men's singles	122	61	61	.500
Women's singles	100	64	36	.640
Men's doubles	119	53	66	.445
Women's doubles	114	52	62	.456
Mixed doubles	117	59	58	.504
Total	572	289	283	.505

== Transactions ==
- March 19, 2008: The Sportimes protected John McEnroe at the WTT Marquee Player Draft.
- April 1, 2008: The Sportimes protected Jesse Witten and Hana Šromová and selected Bethanie Mattek and Brian Wilson at the WTT Roster Player Draft. The Sportimes left Ashley Harkleroad and Mirko Pehar unprotected.
- July 2, 2008: The Sportimes signed Tetiana Luzhanska as a substitute player.
- July 13, 2008: The Sportimes signed Robin Stephenson as a substitute player.
- July 14, 2008: The Sportimes signed Milagros Sequera as a substitute player.
- July 14, 2008: The Sportimes re-signed Ashley Harkleroad as a substitute player.

== See also ==
- Sports in New York
