= 2008 Boston Lobsters season =

- Conference: 3rd Eastern

Record
- 2008 record: 7 wins, 7 losses
- Home record: 4 wins, 3 losses
- Road record: 3 wins, 4 losses
- Games won–lost: 277–267

Team info
- Owner(s): Bahar Uttam
- President/CEO: Bahar Uttam
- Coach: Tim Mayotte
- Stadium: Ferncroft Country Club

The 2008 Boston Lobsters season was the fourth season of the franchise (in its current incarnation) in World TeamTennis (WTT).

The Lobsters finished the regular season with 7 wins and 7 losses and qualified for the WTT playoffs. They lost the WTT Wild Card Match to the Sacramento Capitals, 22–15.

== Season recap ==
=== Move to Middleton led by Mayotte ===
In January 2008, after playing their home matches during the previous three seasons on the campus of Harvard University, the Lobsters announced plans to move to the North Shore region. On March 18, 2008, the Lobsters selected Ferncroft Country Club in Middleton, Massachusetts as their new home. Lobsters owner and CEO Bahar Uttam said a stadium with a seating capacity between 1,500 and 2,000 would be constructed on the grounds of the club. Uttam said that studies conducted by the team revealed that the North Shore had the highest concentration of tennis players in Greater Boston. The Lobsters had also considered moving to the Bass River Tennis Club, but that club only has indoor courts and scrapped plans to build an outdoor stadium, because management felt the $40,000 rent the Lobsters offered to pay did not justify the projected $300,000 stadium construction costs. While announcing the move, the Lobsters also named Tim Mayotte their new head coach, replacing Anne Smith.

=== Drafts ===
In announcing the team's move to Middleton the previous day, the Lobsters also made known their intention to draft and sign Martina Navratilova for the 2008 season. On March 19, 2008, it became official, as Navratilova was selected with the third pick in the Marquee Player Draft. In the Roster Player Draft, the Lobsters chose Jan-Michael Gambill in the first round and left Christina Fusano unprotected. Fusano was selected in the fourth round by the Delaware Smash. In the second round, the Lobsters protected Amir Hadad. This filled the Lobsters' quota of two full-time male players and meant they could not protect Nikita Kryvonos in the third round, where they selected Marie-Ève Pelletier. Raquel Kops-Jones was the team's final selection in the draft, leaving Julie Ditty unprotected. The Lobsters did not select any roster-exempt players.

=== Regular season ===
The Lobsters opened their season on the road against the New York Sportimes on July 3, 2008, and found themselves leading 12–9 after three sets on the strength of Marie-Ève Pelletier's set win in women's singles which followed her women's doubles set win paired with Raquel Kops-Jones. However, the Sportimes won the final two sets and squeezed out of 19–18 victory.

After another loss on the road at the hands of the New York Buzz, the Lobsters hosted the Delaware Smash in the inaugural match on their new home court at the Ferncroft Country Club on July 7, 2008. Jan-Michael Gambill gave the Lobsters an early lead with a 5–3 set win in the opening set of men's singles. Kops-Jones teamed with Pelletier and Amir Hadad for set wins in women's and mixed doubles. After dropping the final set of women's singles to Madison Brengle, Pelletier clinched a 23–19 victory for the Lobsters when she won the third game of overtime.

The following evening, the Lobsters visited Serena Williams and the expansion Washington Kastles in the inaugural home match for the Kastles. Hadad and Gambill opened the match with a 5–1 set win in men's doubles. Hadad then teamed with Kops-Jones for a 5–2 set win over Williams and Justin Gimelstob in mixed doubles. In the third set, Gambill won a men's singles tiebreaker to give the Lobsters a 15–7 lead. Williams and Mashona Washington took the women's doubles set over Kops-Jones and Pelletier in a tiebreaker. After Williams won the final set of women's singles, Pelletier won the third game of overtime to give the Lobsters a 22–19 triumph that evened their record at 2 wins and 2 losses.

Venus Williams led the Philadelphia Freedoms into Ferncroft Country Club on July 10, 2008. She won the opening set of women's singles over Pelletier in a tiebreaker. Williams then paired with Lisa Raymond for a 5–2 set win in women's doubles over Pelletier and Kops-Jones. The Lobsters rebounded when Kops-Jones and Hadad earned a 5–3 set win over Williams and Travis Parrott. After Gambill won a tiebreaker in men's singles, he teamed with Hadad to take another tiebreaker in men's doubles that sent the match to a super tiebreaker. The match came down to a deciding point, which Parrott and Alex Bogomolov Jr. were able to win, giving the Freedoms a 22–21 victory.

The Lobsters' record stood at 3 wins and 5 losses on July 16, 2008, when Martina Navratilova made her season debut in a home match against the Springfield Lasers. Gambill won the opening set of men's singles and teamed with Hadad to win the third set of men's doubles and give the Lobsters a 13–11 lead. Navratilova and Kops-Jones extended the lead to 18–13 by taking the women's doubles set, 5–2. Navratilova and Hadad lost a tiebreaker in the final set of mixed doubles but won the second game of overtime to secure a 23–19 win for the Lobsters.

The Lobsters hit the road the following evening looking to avenge their home loss against the Freedoms. Hadad and Gambill opened the match with a 5–3 set win in men's doubles. Pelletier followed by taking the women's singles, 5–2. After the Freedoms won the mixed doubles set, Kops-Jones and Pelletier dominated women's doubles, 5–1, to give the Lobsters an 18–11 lead. Gambill closed out the match by winning a tiebreaker in men's singles that gave the Lobsters a 23–15 victory. In the midst of a tight playoff race, the split in the season series gave the Lobsters a tiebreaker edge over the Freedoms on the basis of games won in head-to-head meetings, 44–37.

Returning home the next night, the Lobsters faced another playoff contender, the Kastles. Boston won the first four sets of the match to take a 20–9 lead. Hadad paired with Gambill in the opening set and with Kops-Jones in the second set to take the men's and mixed doubles. Gambill and Pelletier each recorded 5–2 set wins in men's and women's doubles, respectively. After the Kastles won the final set of women's doubles, Kops-Jones and Pelletier won the first game of overtime to secure a 23–14 victory. The win gave the Lobsters a season-high three-match winning streak and a record of 6 wins and 5 losses, the first time all season the team had a winning record. It also gave them a sweep of the season series with the Kastles and another important tiebreaker edge.

Playing for the fourth consecutive day, the Lobsters started a home-and-home series with the Newport Beach Breakers. The Breakers won the first four sets to take a 20–13 lead. Navratilova and Kops-Jones blanked Michaela Paštiková and Rebecca Bernhard, 5–0, in the final set of women's doubles to send the match to overtime with the Lobsters trailing, 20–18. However, the Breakers won the first game of overtime to take a 21–18 win and end the Lobsters' winning streak.

After an off day as the teams traveled to the West Coast, the Lobsters carried the momentum they had built at the end of the first match with the Breakers into the start of the second match. Navratilova and Hadad won the opening set of mixed doubles, 5–1. Pelletier followed with a 5–0 set win in women's singles that gave the Lobsters a 10–1 lead. The Breakers turned things around when Ramón Delgado won the third set of men's singles, 5–2, over Gambill, and they went on to win the final three sets, sending the match to overtime with the Lobsters holding a slim 17–16 lead. Hadad and Gambill won the first game of overtime to secure an 18–16 victory that improved the Lobsters' record to 7 wins and 6 losses. With the teams splitting their two regular-season matches, the Breakers, who were also playoff contenders, earned a tiebreaker edge over the Lobsters by winning more games in head-to-head matchups, 37–36.

On July 22, 2008, the Lobsters played their regular-season finale on the road against the defending WTT champion Sacramento Capitals. The Lobsters found themselves in a difficult position on their playoff quest. A victory would have given them a record of 8–6, and guaranteed them the best record among third-place teams in WTT. However, that would not necessarily be enough to secure the WTT wild card berth. The Capitals, as host of WTT Championship Weekend, were guaranteed the wild card berth if they did not finish first or second in the Western Conference. The Capitals record stood at 6–6, and they were in second place. The Breakers were third at 5–7, and the Lasers were fourth at 5–8. Thus, a Capitals loss would keep the Breakers and Lasers in the hunt for second place in the West. The Breakers held a tiebreaker edge over the Capitals, and the Lasers held a tiebreaker edge in the case of a three-way tie with the Capitals and Breakers at 6–8. However, a Capitals win coupled with a Breakers loss (to the Sportimes) would guarantee the Capitals second place in the Western Conference and make the wild card available to the best team not finishing first or second in its conference.

In the match, the Capitals blitzed the Lobsters, winning four of the five sets. Pelletier's dominant 5–1 set win in women's singles was not enough as the Lobsters fell, 21–13, and saw their record drop to 7 wins and 7 losses. Later that evening, the Breakers lost to the Sportimes, clinching second place in the Western Conference for the Capitals.

=== Clinching a playoff berth ===
With their schedule completed, the Lobsters became interested spectators on the final day of the WTT regular season. They were third in the Eastern Conference, and their record stood at 7–7, identical to that of the Philadelphia Freedoms over whom they held a tiebreaker edge. The Washington Kastles entered the final day fifth in the Eastern Conference at 5–8 and were eliminated. The Newport Beach Breakers held third place in the Western Conference at 5–8 and were also eliminated. It would seem that the Lobsters had already clinched the wild card. However, the wild card berth was to be awarded to the team that had the highest overall seeding without finishing in the top two places in its conference. That is not necessarily identical to the third-place team with the best record. In the overall seeding of the teams, it remained possible for the 7–6 Sacramento Capitals, who had already clinched second place in the Western Conference, to finish 7–7, creating a three-way tie with the Lobsters and Freedoms. The games won against common opponents tiebreaker step would apply, and the Freedoms would be first with 157, the Lobsters second with 152 and the Capitals third with 133 plus the number of games they would win in a loss to the Sportimes. The maximum number of wins against common opponents the Capitals could reach in a loss was 157. Therefore, the tiebreaker would have given the Freedoms the wild card and the #4 seed in the WTT playoffs. The Capitals, as the second-place team in the Western Conference, would have been the #5 seed. The Lobsters would be eliminated, even though they held a head-to-head tiebreaker edge over the Freedoms, and even if they finished second in the three-team tiebreaker for the #4 and #5 seeds. Therefore, the Lobsters needed a Capitals victory, which would give Sacramento an 8–6 record to avoid the three-way tie, allowing the Lobsters to win the head-to-head tiebreaker over the Freedoms.

In a tightly contested match that ended the WTT regular season, which would have given the Sportimes the Eastern Conference title had they won, the Capitals prevailed in a final-set tiebreaker, 20–19. The Lobsters made the playoffs on what was literally the season's final point played.

=== WTT Wild Card Match ===
Making their first postseason appearance since 2005, the Lobsters met the Sacramento Capitals in the Wild Card Match on July 24, 2008, at Allstate Stadium at Westfield Galleria at Roseville in Roseville, California, the predetermined site for WTT Championship Weekend, which was also the Capitals' home court. There was some familiarity between the teams, since they had played just two days earlier in the same venue. The Capitals, as the higher seed, set the order of play and opened with Sam Warburg taking the men's singles set, 5–2, from Jan-Michael Gambill. Raquel Kops-Jones and Marie-Ève Pelletier responded for the Lobsters with a 5–2 set win in women's doubles that tied the score at 7 all. After the Capitals won the mixed doubles set, 5–2, the Lobsters turned to Pelletier, who had closed the regular season by winning four of her final five women's singles sets, including a 5–1 triumph over Tamaryn Hendler in the season finale. However, Hendler turned the tables on Pelletier and won the set in a tiebreaker to give the Capitals a 17–13 lead. The Capitals closed out a 22–15 victory by winning the final set of men's doubles.

== Event chronology ==
- March 18, 2008: The Lobsters announced their home matches would be played at Ferncroft Country Club.
- March 18, 2008: The Lobsters announced they had signed Tim Mayotte as the team's new head coach, replacing Anne Smith.
- March 19, 2008: The Lobsters selected Martina Navratilova in the WTT Marquee Player Draft.
- April 1, 2008: The Lobsters protected Amir Hadad and selected Jan-Michael Gambill, Marie-Ève Pelletier and Raquel Kops-Jones at the WTT Roster Player Draft. Christina Fusano, Nikita Kryvonos and Julie Ditty were left unprotected.
- May 1, 2008: The Lobsters' rights to re-sign Arantxa Sánchez Vicario as a wildcard player expired.
- July 23, 2008: With a record of 7 wins and 7 losses, the Lobsters clinched a playoff berth, when the Sacramento Capitals defeated the New York Sportimes, 20–19.
- July 24, 2008: The Lobsters lost the WTT Wild Card Match to the Sacramento Capitals, 22–15.

== Draft picks ==
Since the Lobsters finished with the fourth worst record among nonplayoff teams in WTT in 2007, they selected third in each round of WTT's two drafts, after the Houston Wranglers folded.

=== Marquee Player Draft ===
In the Marquee Player Draft on March 19, 2008, the Lobsters selected Martina Navratilova in the first round. They did not make a second-round selection.

=== Roster Player Draft ===
The league conducted its 2008 Roster Player Draft on April 1, in Miami, Florida. The selections made by the Lobsters are shown in the table below.

Round	No.	Overall	Player chosen	Prot?
1	3	3	(United States) Jan-Michael Gambill	N
2	3	14	(Israel) Amir Hadad	Y
3	3	25	(Canada) Marie-Ève Pelletier	N
4	3	36	(United States) Raquel Kops-Jones	N

The Lobsters did not select any roster-exempt players.

== Match log ==
=== Regular season ===
Legend
Lobsters Win	Lobsters Loss
Home team in CAPS

Match	Date	Venue and location	Result and details	Record
1	July 3	Sportime Stadium at Harbor Island; Mamaroneck, New York	NEW YORK SPORTIMES 19, Boston Lobsters 18 * MD: Brian Wilson/Jesse Witten (Sportimes) 5, Jan-Michael Gambill/Amir Hadad (Lobsters) 2 * WD: Raquel Kops-Jones/Marie-Ève Pelletier (Lobsters) 5, Tetiana Luzhanska/Hana Šromová (Sportimes) 2 * WS: Marie-Ève Pelletier (Lobsters) 5, Tetiana Luzhanska (Sportimes) 2 * MS: Jesse Witten (Sportimes) 5, Jan-Michael Gambill (Lobsters) 3 * XD: Hana Šromová/Brian Wilson (Sportimes) 5, Raquel Kops-Jones/Amir Hadad (Lobsters) 3	0–1
2	July 6	Washington Avenue Armory Sports and Convention Arena; Albany, New York	NEW YORK BUZZ 23, Boston Lobsters 16 * WD: Gabriela Navrátilová/Yaroslava Shvedova (Buzz) 5, Raquel Kops-Jones/Marie-Ève Pelletier (Lobsters) 4 * XD: Nathan Healey/Yaroslava Shvedova (Buzz) 5, Jan-Michael Gambill/Marie-Ève Pelletier (Lobsters) 2 * MS: Amir Hadad (Lobsters) 5, Nathan Healey (Buzz) 3 * MD: Patrick Briaud/Nathan Healey (Buzz) 5, Jan-Michael Gambill/Amir Hadad (Lobsters) 3 * WS: Yaroslava Shvedova (Buzz) 5, Raquel Kops-Jones (Lobsters) 2	0–2
3	July 7	Ferncroft Country Club; Middleton, Massachusetts	BOSTON LOBSTERS 23, Delaware Smash 19 (overtime) * MS: Jan-Michael Gambill (Lobsters) 5, Ryler DeHeart (Smash) 3 * MD: Chris Haggard/Ryler DeHeart (Smash) 5, Amir Hadad/Jan-Michael Gambill (Lobsters) 4 * WD: Raquel Kops-Jones/Marie-Ève Pelletier (Lobsters) 5, Christina Fusano/Madison Brengle (Smash) 3 * XD: Raquel Kops-Jones/Amir Hadad (Lobsters) 5, Christina Fusano/Chris Haggard (Smash) 1 * WS: Madison Brengle (Smash) 5, Marie-Ève Pelletier (Lobsters) 3 * OT - WS: Madison Brengle (Smash) 2, Marie-Ève Pelletier (Lobsters) 1	1–2
4	July 8	Kastles Stadium at CityCenterDC; Washington, District of Columbia	Boston Lobsters 22, WASHINGTON KASTLES 19 (overtime) * MD: Amir Hadad/Jan-Michael Gambill (Lobsters) 5, Scott Oudsema/Justin Gimelstob (Kastles) 1 * XD: Raquel Kops-Jones/Amir Hadad (Lobsters) 5, Serena Williams/Justin Gimelstob (Kastles) 2 * MS: Jan-Michael Gambill (Lobsters) 5, Justin Gimelstob (Kastles) 4 * WD: Mashona Washington/Serena Williams (Kastles) 5, Raquel Kops-Jones/Marie-Ève Pelletier (Lobsters) 4 * WS: Serena Williams (Kastles) 5, Marie-Ève Pelletier (Lobsters) 2 * OT - WS: Serena Williams (Kastles) 2, Marie-Ève Pelletier (Lobsters) 1	2–2
5	July 10	Ferncroft Country Club; Middleton, Massachusetts	Philadelphia Freedoms 22, BOSTON LOBSTERS 21 (super tiebreaker, 7–6) * WS: Venus Williams (Freedoms) 5, Marie-Ève Pelletier (Lobsters) 4 * WD: Venus Williams/Lisa Raymond (Freedoms) 5, Raquel Kops-Jones/Marie-Ève Pelletier (Lobsters) 2 * XD: Raquel Kops-Jones/Amir Hadad (Lobsters) 5, Venus Williams/Travis Parrott (Freedoms) 3 * MS: Jan-Michael Gambill (Lobsters) 5, Alex Bogomolov Jr. (Freedoms) 4 * MD: Amir Hadad/Jan-Michael Gambill (Lobsters) 5, Alex Bogomolov Jr./Travis Parrott (Freedoms) 4 * STB - MD: Alex Bogomolov Jr./Travis Parrott (Freedoms) 7, Amir Hadad/Jan-Michael Gambill (Lobsters) 6	2–3
6	July 12	Ferncroft Country Club; Middleton, Massachusetts	New York Buzz 20, BOSTON LOBSTERS 19 (super tiebreaker, 7–4) * WS: Yaroslava Shvedova (Buzz) 5, Marie-Ève Pelletier (Lobsters) 2 * WD: Gabriela Navrátilová/Yaroslava Shvedova (Buzz) 5, Raquel Kops-Jones/Marie-Ève Pelletier (Lobsters) 3 * XD: Yaroslava Shvedova/Nathan Healey (Buzz) 5, Raquel Kops-Jones/Amir Hadad (Lobsters) 4 * MS: Jan-Michael Gambill (Lobsters) 5, Nathan Healey (Buzz) 0 * MD: Amir Hadad/Jan-Michael Gambill (Lobsters) 5, Patrick Briaud/Nathan Healey (Buzz) 4 * STB - MD: Patrick Briaud/Nathan Healey (Buzz) 7, Amir Hadad/Jan-Michael Gambill (Lobsters) 4	2–4
7	July 13	Ferncroft Country Club; Middleton, Massachusetts	BOSTON LOBSTERS 23, New York Sportimes 17 * MD: Amir Hadad/Jan-Michael Gambill (Lobsters) 5, Brian Wilson/Jesse Witten (Sportimes) 2 * WD: Raquel Kops-Jones/Marie-Ève Pelletier (Lobsters) 5, Hana Šromová/Robin Stephenson (Sportimes) 1 * MS: Jesse Witten (Sportimes) 5, Jan-Michael Gambill (Lobsters) 4 * WS: Hana Šromová (Sportimes) 5, Marie-Ève Pelletier (Lobsters) 4 * XD: Raquel Kops-Jones/Amir Hadad (Lobsters) 5, Robin Stephenson/Brian Wilson (Sportimes) 4 *** Robin Stephenson substituted for Hana Šromová at 0–1	3–4
8	July 14	Barney Allis Plaza; Kansas City, Missouri	KANSAS CITY EXPLORERS 22, Boston Lobsters 17 * MS: Jan-Michael Gambill (Lobsters) 5, Dušan Vemić (Explorers) 4 * WS: Marie-Ève Pelletier (Lobsters) 5, Květa Peschke (Explorers) 4 * MD: Amir Hadad/Jan-Michael Gambill (Lobsters) 5, Dušan Vemić/James Auckland (Explorers) 4 * XD: Rennae Stubbs/Dušan Vemić (Explorers) 5, Raquel Kops-Jones/Amir Hadad (Lobsters) 2 * WD: Rennae Stubbs/Květa Peschke (Explorers) 5, Raquel Kops-Jones/Marie-Ève Pelletier (Lobsters) 0	3–5
9	July 16	Ferncroft Country Club; Middleton, Massachusetts	BOSTON LOBSTERS 23, Springfield Lasers 19 (overtime) * MS: Jan-Michael Gambill (Lobsters) 5, Glenn Weiner (Lasers) 2 * WS: Chanelle Scheepers (Lasers) 5, Marie-Ève Pelletier (Lobsters) 3 * MD: Amir Hadad/Jan-Michael Gambill (Lobsters) 5, Glenn Weiner/Todd Perry (Lasers) 4 * WD: Martina Navratilova/Raquel Kops-Jones (Lobsters) 5, Shenay Perry/Chanelle Scheepers (Lasers) 2 * XD: Shenay Perry/Todd Perry (Lasers) 5, Martina Navratilova/Amir Hadad (Lobsters) 4 *** Shenay Perry substituted for Chanelle Scheepers at 1–2 * OT - XD: Martina Navratilova/Amir Hadad (Lobsters) 1, Shenay Perry/Todd Perry (Lasers) 1	4–5
10	July 17	King of Prussia Mall; Upper Merion Township, Pennsylvania	Boston Lobsters 23, PHILADELPHIA FREEDOMS 15 * MD: Amir Hadad/Jan-Michael Gambill (Lobsters) 5, Alex Bogomolov Jr./Travis Parrott (Freedoms) 3 * WS: Marie-Ève Pelletier (Lobsters) 5, Audra Cohen (Freedoms) 2 * XD: Lisa Raymond/Travis Parrott (Freedoms) 5, Raquel Kops-Jones/Amir Hadad (Lobsters) 3 * WD: Raquel Kops-Jones/Marie-Ève Pelletier (Lobsters) 5, Lisa Raymond/Audra Cohen (Freedoms) 1 * MS: Jan-Michael Gambill (Lobsters) 5, Alex Bogomolov Jr. (Freedoms) 4	5–5
11	July 18	Ferncroft Country Club; Middleton, Massachusetts	BOSTON LOBSTERS 23, Washington Kastles 14 * MD: Amir Hadad/Jan-Michael Gambill (Lobsters) 5, Scott Oudsema/Justin Gimelstob (Kastles) 3 * XD: Raquel Kops-Jones/Amir Hadad (Lobsters) 5, Mashona Washington/Scott Oudsema (Kastles) 2 * MS: Jan-Michael Gambill (Lobsters) 5, Scott Oudsema (Kastles) 2 * WS: Marie-Ève Pelletier (Lobsters) 5, Sacha Jones (Kastles) 2 * WD: Mashona Washington/Sacha Jones (Kastles) 5, Raquel Kops-Jones/Marie-Ève Pelletier (Lobsters) 2 * OT - WD: Raquel Kops-Jones/Marie-Ève Pelletier (Lobsters) 1, Mashona Washington/Sacha Jones (Kastles) 0	6–5
12	July 19	Ferncroft Country Club; Middleton, Massachusetts	Newport Beach Breakers 21, BOSTON LOBSTERS 18 (overtime) * MS: Ramón Delgado (Breakers) 5, Jan-Michael Gambill (Lobsters) 4 * WS: Michaela Paštiková (Breakers) 5, Marie-Ève Pelletier (Lobsters) 3 * MD: Ramón Delgado/Kaes Van't Hof (Breakers) 5, Amir Hadad/Jan-Michael Gambill (Lobsters) 3 * XD: Michaela Paštiková/Kaes Van't Hof (Breakers) 5, Martina Navratilova/Amir Hadad (Lobsters) 3 * WD: Martina Navratilova/Raquel Kops-Jones (Lobsters) 5, Michaela Paštiková/Rebecca Bernhard (Breakers) 0 * OT - WD: Michaela Paštiková/Rebecca Bernhard (Breakers) 1, Martina Navratilova/Raquel Kops-Jones (Lobsters) 0	6–6
13	July 21	Breakers Stadium at the Newport Beach Country Club; Newport Beach, California	Boston Lobsters 18, NEWPORT BEACH BREAKERS 16 (overtime) * XD: Martina Navratilova/Amir Hadad (Lobsters) 5, Lilia Osterloh/Kaes Van't Hof (Breakers) 1 * WS: Marie-Ève Pelletier (Lobsters) 5, Lilia Osterloh (Breakers) 0 * MS: Ramón Delgado (Breakers) 5, Jan-Michael Gambill (Lobsters) 2 * WD: Lilia Osterloh/Michaela Paštiková (Breakers) 5, Martina Navratilova/Raquel Kops-Jones (Lobsters) 3 * MD: Ramón Delgado/Kaes Van't Hof (Breakers) 5, Amir Hadad/Jan-Michael Gambill (Lobsters) 2 * OT - MD: Amir Hadad/Jan-Michael Gambill (Lobsters) 1, Ramón Delgado/Kaes Van't Hof (Breakers) 0	7–6
14	July 22	Allstate Stadium at Westfield Galleria at Roseville; Roseville, California	SACRAMENTO CAPITALS 21, Boston Lobsters 13 * MS: Sam Warburg (Capitals) 5, Jan-Michael Gambill (Lobsters) 2 * WD: Elena Likhovtseva/Tamaryn Hendler (Capitals) 5, Raquel Kops-Jones/Marie-Ève Pelletier (Lobsters) 1 * XD: Elena Likhovtseva/Eric Butorac (Capitals) 5, Raquel Kops-Jones/Amir Hadad (Lobsters) 3 * WS: Marie-Ève Pelletier (Lobsters) 5, Tamaryn Hendler (Capitals) 1 * MD: Sam Warburg/Eric Butorac (Capitals) 5, Amir Hadad/Jan-Michael Gambill (Lobsters) 2	7–7

=== Playoffs ===
Legend
Lobsters Win	Lobsters Loss
Home team in CAPS

World TeamTennis Wild Card Match

Date	Venue and location	Result and details
July 24	Allstate Stadium at Westfield Galleria at Roseville; Roseville, California	SACRAMENTO CAPITALS 22, Boston Lobsters 15 * MS: Sam Warburg (Capitals) 5, Jan-Michael Gambill (Lobsters) 2 * WD: Raquel Kops-Jones/Marie-Ève Pelletier (Lobsters) 5, Elena Likhovtseva/Tamaryn Hendler (Capitals) 2 * XD: Elena Likhovtseva/Eric Butorac (Capitals) 5, Raquel Kops-Jones/Amir Hadad (Lobsters) 2 * WS: Tamaryn Hendler (Capitals) 5, Marie-Ève Pelletier (Lobsters) 4 * MD: Sam Warburg/Eric Butorac (Capitals) 5, Amir Hadad/Jan-Michael Gambill (Lobsters) 2

== Team personnel ==
=== On-court personnel ===
- (United States) Tim Mayotte – Coach
- (United States) Jan-Michael Gambill
- (Israel) Amir Hadad
- (United States) Raquel Kops-Jones
- (United States) Martina Navratilova
- (Canada) Marie-Ève Pelletier

=== Front office ===
- Bahar Uttam – Owner and CEO

== Statistics ==
Players are listed in order of their game-winning percentage provided they played in at least 40% of the Lobsters' games in that event, which is the WTT minimum for qualification for league leaders in individual statistical categories.

Men's singles - regular season

Player	GP	GW	GL	PCT
Jan-Michael Gambill	103	55	48	.534
Amir Hadad	8	5	3	.625
Total	111	60	51	.541

Women's singles - regular season

Player	GP	GW	GL	PCT
Marie-Ève Pelletier	103	53	50	.515
Raquel Kops-Jones	7	2	5	.286
Total	110	55	55	.500

Men's doubles - regular season

Player	GP	GW	GL	PCT
Jan-Michael Gambill	114	57	57	.500
Amir Hadad	114	57	57	.500
Total	114	57	57	.500

Women's doubles - regular season

Player	GP	GW	GL	PCT
Raquel Kops-Jones	100	50	50	.500
Marie-Ève Pelletier	79	37	42	.468
Martina Navratilova	21	13	8	.619
Total	100	50	50	.500

Mixed doubles - regular season

Player	GP	GW	GL	PCT
Amir Hadad	102	53	49	.520
Raquel Kops-Jones	77	40	37	.519
Martina Navratilova	25	13	12	.520
Jan-Michael Gambill	7	2	5	.286
Marie-Ève Pelletier	7	2	5	.286
Total	109	55	54	.505

Team totals - regular season

Event	GP	GW	GL	PCT
Men's singles	111	60	51	.541
Women's singles	110	55	55	.500
Men's doubles	114	57	57	.500
Women's doubles	100	50	50	.500
Mixed doubles	109	55	54	.505
Total	544	277	267	.509

Men's singles - playoffs

Player	GP	GW	GL	PCT
Jan-Michael Gambill	7	2	5	.286
Total	7	2	5	.286

Women's singles - playoffs

Player	GP	GW	GL	PCT
Marie-Ève Pelletier	9	4	5	.444
Total	9	4	5	.444

Men's doubles - playoffs

Player	GP	GW	GL	PCT
Jan-Michael Gambill	7	2	5	.286
Amir Hadad	7	2	5	.286
Total	7	2	5	.286

Women's doubles - playoffs

Player	GP	GW	GL	PCT
Raquel Kops-Jones	7	5	2	.714
Marie-Ève Pelletier	7	5	2	.714
Total	7	5	2	.714

Mixed doubles - playoffs

Player	GP	GW	GL	PCT
Amir Hadad	7	2	5	.286
Raquel Kops-Jones	7	2	5	.286
Total	7	2	5	.286

Team totals - playoffs

Event	GP	GW	GL	PCT
Men's singles	7	2	5	.286
Women's singles	9	4	5	.444
Men's doubles	7	2	5	.286
Women's doubles	7	5	2	.714
Mixed doubles	7	2	5	.286
Total	37	15	22	.405

Men's singles - all matches

Player	GP	GW	GL	PCT
Jan-Michael Gambill	110	57	53	.518
Amir Hadad	8	5	3	.625
Total	118	62	56	.525

Women's singles - all matches

Player	GP	GW	GL	PCT
Marie-Ève Pelletier	112	57	55	.509
Raquel Kops-Jones	7	2	5	.286
Total	119	59	60	.496

Men's doubles - all matches

Player	GP	GW	GL	PCT
Jan-Michael Gambill	121	59	62	.488
Amir Hadad	121	59	62	.488
Total	121	59	62	.488

Women's doubles - all matches

Player	GP	GW	GL	PCT
Raquel Kops-Jones	107	55	52	.514
Marie-Ève Pelletier	86	42	44	.488
Martina Navratilova	21	13	8	.619
Total	107	55	52	.514

Mixed doubles - all matches

Player	GP	GW	GL	PCT
Amir Hadad	109	55	54	.505
Raquel Kops-Jones	84	42	42	.500
Martina Navratilova	25	13	12	.520
Jan-Michael Gambill	7	2	5	.286
Marie-Ève Pelletier	7	2	5	.286
Total	116	57	59	.491

Team totals - all matches

Event	GP	GW	GL	PCT
Men's singles	118	62	56	.525
Women's singles	119	59	60	.496
Men's doubles	121	59	62	.488
Women's doubles	107	55	52	.514
Mixed doubles	116	57	59	.491
Total	581	292	289	.503

== Transactions ==
- March 18, 2008: The Lobsters announced they had signed Tim Mayotte as the team's new head coach, replacing Anne Smith.
- March 19, 2008: The Lobsters selected Martina Navratilova in the WTT Marquee Player Draft.
- April 1, 2008: The Lobsters protected Amir Hadad and selected Jan-Michael Gambill, Marie-Ève Pelletier and Raquel Kops-Jones at the WTT Roster Player Draft. Christina Fusano, Nikita Kryvonos and Julie Ditty were left unprotected.
- May 1, 2008: The Lobsters' rights to re-sign Arantxa Sánchez Vicario as a wildcard player expired.

== See also ==
- Sports in Boston
