= 2013 Bikini Basketball Association season =

- League: Bikini Basketball Association
- Sport: Women's basketball
- Duration: June 22, 2013 - September 21, 2013

Regular season
- Season champions: Miami Spice

BBA Championship
- Finals champions: Illinois Heart
- Runners-up: Miami Spice

Bikini Basketball Association seasons
- N/A 2014 →

The 2013 Bikini Basketball Association season was the first season of the Bikini Basketball Association. The regular season began on June 22 and ended on August 17 with a championship series on September 21. While the Miami Spice went 5–0 to claim the regular season crown they were defeated by the Illinois Heart in the championship game.

== Regular season ==
The league began its inaugural season on June 22, 2013, with five teams of women selected for looks, personality, and playing ability. In late June 2013, the Philadelphia Diamonds shut down before their inaugural game. This reduced the league to four teams playing a combined total of 12 games over 10 weeks. The Miami Spice went 5–0, the Illinois Heart went 3–2, the Houston Inferno struggled to a 1–4 finish, and the Las Vegas Fantasy went 0–3 before folding in late July 2013. The Las Vegas collapse further reduced the number of completed games in the inaugural regular season to 9.

== Playoffs ==
Several weeks after the regular season ended, the league announced that the three surviving teams would compete in a two-game single-elimination tournament at the Kroc Center in Chicago on September 21, 2013. The Illinois Heart defeated the Houston Inferno 94–77 to advance to the championship later that day. Illinois defeated the regular season champion Miami Spice 96–89 to claim the league championship.

== 2013 schedule ==
=== Regular season ===
Week	Date	Home team	Visitor	Results	
Week	Date	Home team	Visitor	Score	Winner
1	June 22	Houston Inferno	Las Vegas Fantasy	46–42	Houston
1	June 22	Illinois Heart	Miami Spice	57–64	Miami
2	June 29	Las Vegas Fantasy	Illinois Heart	30–101	Illinois
3	July 6	Miami Spice	Houston Inferno	102–68	Miami
4	July 13	Houston Inferno	Illinois Heart	42–53	Illinois
5	July 20	Miami Spice	Las Vegas Fantasy	82–76	Miami
6	~~July 27~~	Las Vegas Fantasy	Houston Inferno	–	(cancelled)
6	July 27	Miami Spice	Illinois Heart	101–79	Miami
7	~~August 3~~	Illinois Heart	Las Vegas Fantasy	–	(cancelled)
8	August 10	Houston Inferno	Miami Spice	49–77	Miami
9	August 17	Illinois Heart	Houston Inferno	73–54	Illinois
10	~~August 24~~	Las Vegas Fantasy	Miami Spice	–	(cancelled)

=== Championship ===
Game	Date	Home team	Visitor	Results	
Game	Date	Home team	Visitor	Score	Winner
Semi	September 21	Illinois Heart	Houston Inferno	94–77	Illinois
Final	September 21	Illinois Heart	Miami Spice	96–89	Illinois

== League standings ==
2013 Bikini Basketball Association standings
	W	L	T	PCT	GB	STK
Miami Spice	5	0	0	1.000	0.0	W5
Illinois Heart	3	2	0	0.600	2.0	W1
Houston Inferno	1	4	0	0.200	4.0	L4
Las Vegas Fantasy (folded)	0	3	0	0.000	4.0	L3
