= 2014 Bikini Basketball Association season =

- League: Bikini Basketball Association
- Sport: Women's basketball
- Duration: June 2014 - September 2014

Regular season
- Season champions: Illinois Heart

BBA Championship
- Finals champions: Illinois Heart
- Runners-up: Houston Inferno

Bikini Basketball Association seasons
- ← 2013 2015 →

The 2014 Bikini Basketball Association season was the second season of the Bikini Basketball Association. The regular season began on June 21 and ended on August 23 with a championship series on September 27 in Atlanta, Georgia. The Illinois Heart went undefeated during the regular season and won their second consecutive BBA Championship.

== Regular season ==
The Houston Inferno, Miami Spice, and reigning league champion Illinois Heart franchises all returned for 2014. The league expanded to include a new team dubbed the Atlanta Storm. In late May, the league released its 2014 schedule with league play set to begin on June 21 and conclude on August 30. Each team was scheduled to play 6 games over 11 weeks with the league taking July 5 and August 9 as bye weeks.

However, the Miami Spice folded just before the season started and they were dropped from the schedule. This meant each remaining team was scheduled to play 4 games over 10 weeks with the season ending on August 23. Illinois ended the regular season a perfect 4–0, Houston split for a 2–2 record, and expansion Atlanta was winless at 0–4.

== Playoffs ==
The league announced a three-team playoff to be held in Atlanta, Georgia, on September 27, 2014. The Atlanta Storm hosted the Houston Inferno in the first round for the right to face the Illinois Heart in the Finals. Houston won the first game but fell to Illinois in the second, giving the Heart back-to-back BBA playoff championships.

== 2014 schedule ==
=== Regular season ===
Week	Date	Home team	Visitor	Results	
Week	Date	Home team	Visitor	Score	Winner
1	June 21	Houston Inferno	Miami Spice	-	-
1	June 21	Illinois Heart	Atlanta Storm	forfeit	Illinois
2	June 28	Miami Spice	Illinois Heart	-	-
3	July 5	BYE			
4	July 12	Houston Inferno	Illinois Heart	55–60	Illinois
5	July 19	Illinois Heart	Miami Spice	-	-
5	July 19	Atlanta Storm	Houston Inferno	66–73	Houston
6	July 26	Miami Spice	Atlanta Storm	-	-
7	August 2	Miami Spice	Houston Inferno	-	-
7	August 2	Atlanta Storm	Illinois Heart	73–84	Illinois
8	August 9	BYE			
9	August 16	Illinois Heart	Houston Inferno	61–52	Illinois
10	August 23	Houston Inferno	Atlanta Storm	??–??	Houston
11	August 30	Atlanta Storm	Miami Spice	-	-

=== Post-season ===
Game	Date	Home team	Visitor	Results	
Game	Date	Home team	Visitor	Score	Winner
1	September 27	Atlanta Storm	Houston Inferno	56–74	Houston
2	September 27	Illinois Heart	Houston Inferno	79–76	Illinois

== League standings ==
2014 Bikini Basketball Association standings
	W	L	T	PCT	GB	STK
Illinois Heart	4	0	0	1.000	0.0	W4
Houston Inferno	2	2	0	0.500	2.0	W1
Atlanta Storm	0	4	0	0.000	4.0	L4
Miami Spice (folded)	-	-	-	-	-	-
