= Bikini Basketball Association =

Defunct American women's basketball league

- Most recent season or competition: 2014 Bikini Basketball Association season
- Sport: Basketball
- Founded: 2012; 14 years ago
- First season: 2013
- CEO: A. J. McArthur
- Motto: "In a League of its Own"
- No. of teams: 3
- Country: United States
- Most recent champion: Illinois Heart
- Most titles: Illinois Heart (2 titles)
- Website: bikinibasketball.com

The Bikini Basketball Association (BBA) was an American women's basketball league, created by Cedric Mitchell and A. J. McArthur in 2012. The announcement received wide press coverage with pundits finding it variously funny, offensive, and smart business. Contrary to the name, the players wear sports bras and boy shorts, not bikinis, during games.

The league launched its 2013 season on June 22 with five teams but only three teams completed the abbreviated regular season on August 17. The undefeated Miami Spice claimed the regular season title but fell in the September 21 championship game to the Illinois Heart. The 2014 season began on June 21 with four teams, including the expansion Atlanta Storm, but the Miami Spice forfeited their first game then folded. The remaining three teams completed their abbreviated season on August 23, 2014, with Illinois going undefeated, Houston at 2-2, and Atlanta remaining winless. Illinois defeated Houston in the September 27 championship final to repeat as BBA champs. The league did not play a schedule in 2015.

== History ==
=== Getting organized ===
In September 2012, the league originally announced seven teams with league operations to begin on November 3, 2012, and play to begin in 2013. The originally announced teams were the Atlanta Fleet Angels, Chicago Desire, Hollywood Hotties, Los Angeles Ice, Miami Spice, New York Knockouts, and Orlando LadyCats. In early October, league officials told the press they were seeking to add franchises "in Dallas and Minnesota, plus one more."

In November 2012, the league announced that the Minnesota Mist had joined the league, the Fleet Angels had changed their name to the Atlanta Peaches, and the league would start play in May 2013. In late November 2012, the Chicago Desire franchise was disbanded by the league and replaced by a new franchise, the Chicago Crave. In early January 2013, the league's website dropped mention of the Hollywood Hotties and added a new team called the Illinois Heart.

In mid-January 2013, the Atlanta Peaches announced the signing of Deiondra Sanders, daughter of sports legend and broadcaster Deion Sanders. The Peaches (and Sanders) left the league on March 13, 2013.

When the full BBA website debuted on January 18, 2013, the start date for the league was announced as June 1, 2013, with eight teams: Atlanta Peaches, Chicago Crave, Los Angeles Ice, Miami Spice, Orlando Lady Cats, Minnesota Mist, Illinois Heart, and Philadelphia Diamonds. The newly announced Philadelphia team replaced the previously announced New York Knockouts. By the end of January, both the Chicago Crave and Los Angeles Ice had withdrawn from the league.

On March 13, the Minnesota Mist, Atlanta Peaches, and Orlando Lady Cats announced that they had moved on to a new Reebok-sponsored "Beautiful Ballers League" along with new teams in Brooklyn, Los Angeles, New Orleans, and Miami. By late March, only the Illinois, Miami, and Philadelphia teams were listed on the BBA site, a new "Las Vegas Fantasy" franchise was announced, and the league's start date had been changed from June to "Summer". In early April, the Houston Inferno were added to the now 5-team league.

=== 2013 season ===
In January 2013, the league announced a schedule but that schedule was taken down in February as the league's membership was in flux. On April 15, the league announced a 10-week regular season schedule featuring 2 games each Saturday from June 22 to August 24. Each BBA team was originally scheduled to play 8 games during the season.

The league began its inaugural season on June 22, 2013, with five teams of women selected for looks, personality, and playing ability. These five teams were the Houston Inferno, Illinois Heart, Las Vegas Fantasy, Miami Spice, and the Philadelphia Diamonds.

The Philadelphia Diamonds had been set to play their first game on June 29, hosting Houston at Competitive Edge Sports in King of Prussia (relocated from the Pennsylvania National Guard Armory in Philadelphia), under coach Wanda Williams. In late June and without apparent notice, the game was cancelled and the team removed from the league's schedule and official website.

This reduced the league to four teams playing a combined total of 12 games over 10 weeks. In late July 2013, the Las Vegas Fantasy went dormant, further reducing the number of completed games in the inaugural season to 9. The Miami Spice compiled a 5–0 record to claim the regular season title. A playoff series was played at the Kroc Center in Chicago on September 21, 2013, and the Illinois Heart emerged as league champion.

2013 Bikini Basketball Association standings
	W	L	T	PCT	GB	STK
Miami Spice	5	0	0	1.000	0.0	W5
Illinois Heart	3	2	0	0.600	2.0	W1
Houston Inferno	1	4	0	0.200	4.0	L4
Las Vegas Fantasy (folded)	0	3	0	0.000	4.0	L3

=== 2014 season ===
The Houston Inferno, Miami Spice, and reigning league champion Illinois Heart franchises all returned for 2014. The league announced expansion plans for 2014 and beyond, including a new team for this season known as the Atlanta Storm. The 2014 season began shakily with the first two games won by forfeit but play resumed in earnest in July. The Miami Spice, however, did not return to the court and the franchise was folded. The reduced schedule saw each remaining team play two home games and two road games before the season ended on August 23, 2014.

Illinois won all four of its games, home and road, while the Houston team split their home and road series, and Atlanta went winless on the season. The league announced a three-team playoff to be held in Atlanta on September 27, 2014. The Atlanta Storm hosted the Houston Inferno in the first round for the right to face the Illinois Heart in the Finals. Houston won the first game but fell to Illinois in the second, giving the Heart back-to-back BBA playoff championships.

2014 Bikini Basketball Association standings
	W	L	T	PCT	GB	STK
Illinois Heart	4	0	0	1.000	0.0	W4
Houston Inferno	2	2	0	0.500	2.0	W1
Atlanta Storm	0	4	0	0.000	4.0	L4
Miami Spice (folded)	-	-	-	-	-	-

== Teams ==
Each BBA team features between 14 and 21 women on their rosters.

2013 Teams
Team	City	Arena	Coach
Atlanta Storm	Atlanta, Georgia	TBA	TBA
Houston Inferno	Houston, Texas	Delmar Fieldhouse	Tony Gatlin
Illinois Heart	Chicago, Illinois	Quest Multisport Chicago	Lionel Miller
Miami Spice	Miami, Florida	Jose Marti Gym/Coral Springs Gym	Nicholas Greer

== Players ==
League officials told Miami New Times that player auditions include "an on-court component, as well as a videotaped interview" and that "just looking pretty ain't gonna cut it — you've gotta be good with a ball, too." In addition to a test of standard basketball skills, prospective players are interviewed to see "if they have the mind frame and personality" the league is looking for. Chicago Desire general manager Donovan Price defended the league to the press, noting "It's not all about the bikinis. You know, Hooters is what it is, but the wings are actually good."

While the league's publicity images show players in skimpy bikinis, league commissioner and Miami Spice franchise owner A.J. McArthur told The Miami Herald, "The girls wear sports bras and shorts, nothing you won't see on a beach." He later clarified that they "plan to go in the same direction of the Olympic Volleyball uniforms." In December 2012 and January 2013, the Miami New Times ran a series of interviews with the initial 12 players on the Miami Spice roster, including photographs of the women in uniform.

== Similar leagues ==
Media reports compare the league to the financially successful Lingerie Football League and the fledgling Bikini Hockey League. Rick Chandler of NBC Sports opined, "Considering the success of the Lingerie Football League [...] it’s no wonder that someone would try a league with hot girls playing basketball." Unlike the Lingerie Hockey League, which operates with just two teams and includes a reality show component, the BBA plans eight teams in regular league competition.

The Bikini Basketball Association should not be confused with the rival Lingerie Basketball League which began play in 2011 with four teams (Divas, Glam, Starlets, and Beauties) all based in the greater Los Angeles area. Nor should it be confused with the proposed Bikini Basketball League which planned to field teams across the United States, including the Texas Hot Sauce, California Wildfire, New York Dimes, Indiana Milkshake, Florida Honeydrippers, and Kentucky Cupcakes.

== Critical reaction ==
Some pundits found humor in the BBA's announcement. Writing for The Miami Herald, columnist Greg Cote quipped "If teams in that league have a merchandise sale and the signs read, 'All our clothing 75 percent off' — they mean it." The staff of the New England Sports Network wrote "Women in bikinis add interest to anything." The International Business Times wondered "What's next? The Nude Baseball League?"

Others declared the idea sexist and demeaning. Gender equality expert Janet Fink, associate professor in Sport Management at University of Massachusetts Amherst, told The Boston Globe that the idea behind the BBA "drives me nuts." Krystie Yandoli, writing for The Nation, said her issue was not with the players but rather "the larger systems and economic forces that circumscribe choices and channel female athletes into choosing to play ball in a bikini for pay" and that the league "sends a message that we only take women's sports seriously when players prance around nearly nude."

== Controversy ==
Bloggers were quick to note that the original Miami Spice logo was strikingly similar to one made famous by the now-defunct Seattle SuperSonics. Royce Young of CBS Sports wrote that the Spice "took no shame in completely ripping off" the logo. The Spice logo was redesigned in late 2012.

The Miami Spice also generated controversy when the Miami-Dade County Public Schools banned the team from its high school campuses, reacting in part to the sexy images on the team's recruiting poster. Planned tryouts for prospective players were to be held at Miami Edison Senior High School until the school board stepped in, noting that the use of the school "was never officially authorized". The tryouts were moved to an indoor gym at Elizabeth Virrick Park in the Coconut Grove section of Miami.

== See also ==
- Legends Football League
