= Texarkana Bandits (GCHL) =

- City: Texarkana, Arkansas
- League: Gulf Coast Hockey League
- Founded: 2001
- Folded: 2003
- Home arena: Four States Arena
- Colors: Green, Blue and Black
- General manager: Fay J. Durant
- Head coach: Colby Van Tassel

Championships
- Regular season titles: 2001–02
- Playoff championships: 2002

The Texarkana Bandits were an American minor professional ice hockey team located in Texarkana, Arkansas. The franchise existed for one season in the Gulf Coast Hockey League before folding a year after the league dissolved.

== History ==
In the brief history of the GCHL, Texarkana was the class of the league. In its lone season of existence, the Bandits won 28 of 30 games (.933 %) and won the league championship by over 30 points. Texarkana's lone playoff game was in line with the earlier scores and they defeated the Dallas Sabres 8–1.

Though the league initially planned to return for a second season, the GCHL disbanded without much fanfare over the summer. The Bandits played one more season as an independent team, before folding themselves.

== Season-by-season record ==
Season	GP	W	L	T	Pts	Place	Playoffs
2001–02	30	28	2	0	56	1st	Champions
