= Dallas Sabres =

- City: Fort Worth, Texas
- League: Gulf Coast Hockey League
- Founded: 2001
- Folded: 2002
- Home arena: Blue Line Ice Complex
- Colors: Red and Black
- General manager: Jane Goss
- Head coach: Rob Lewis

The Dallas Sabres were an American minor professional ice hockey team located in Fort Worth, Texas. The franchise existed for one season in the Gulf Coast Hockey League before folding when the league dissolved.

== History ==
Dallas was one of four teams arranged for the inaugural season of the Gulf Coast Hockey League in 2001. The roster was put together by team owner Pete Griffith and he an appointed Rob Lewis as the player/coach for the first season. After one of the teams failed to materialize, Dallas found itself as the middle child of the group and the squad was able to play most of its scheduled games. In late February, the league approved the sale of the franchise to a new group headed by Jane Goss, who took over as general manager. Dallas finished the year in second place and met Houston in the semifinals. The Sabres won the right to face the Texarkana Bandits for the championship but were routed 1–8 in their final game.

Though the league initially planned to return for a second season, the GCHL disbanded without much fanfare over the summer and all three existing teams permanently suspended operations.

== Season-by-season record ==
Season	GP	W	L	T	Pts	Place	Playoffs
2001–02	29	11	17	1	23	2nd	Runner-Up
