= Sports in Houston =

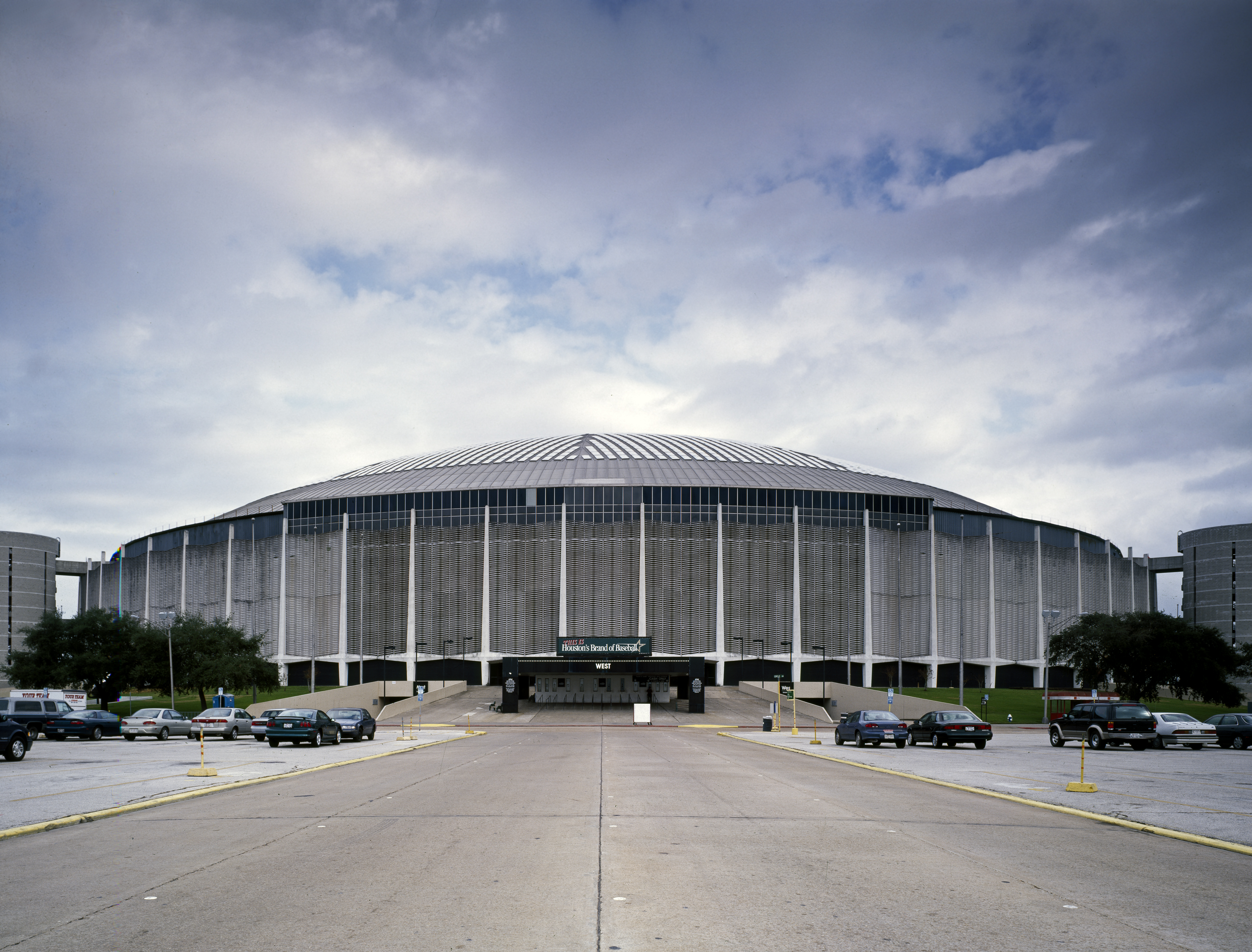
Astrodome, the world's first domed stadium

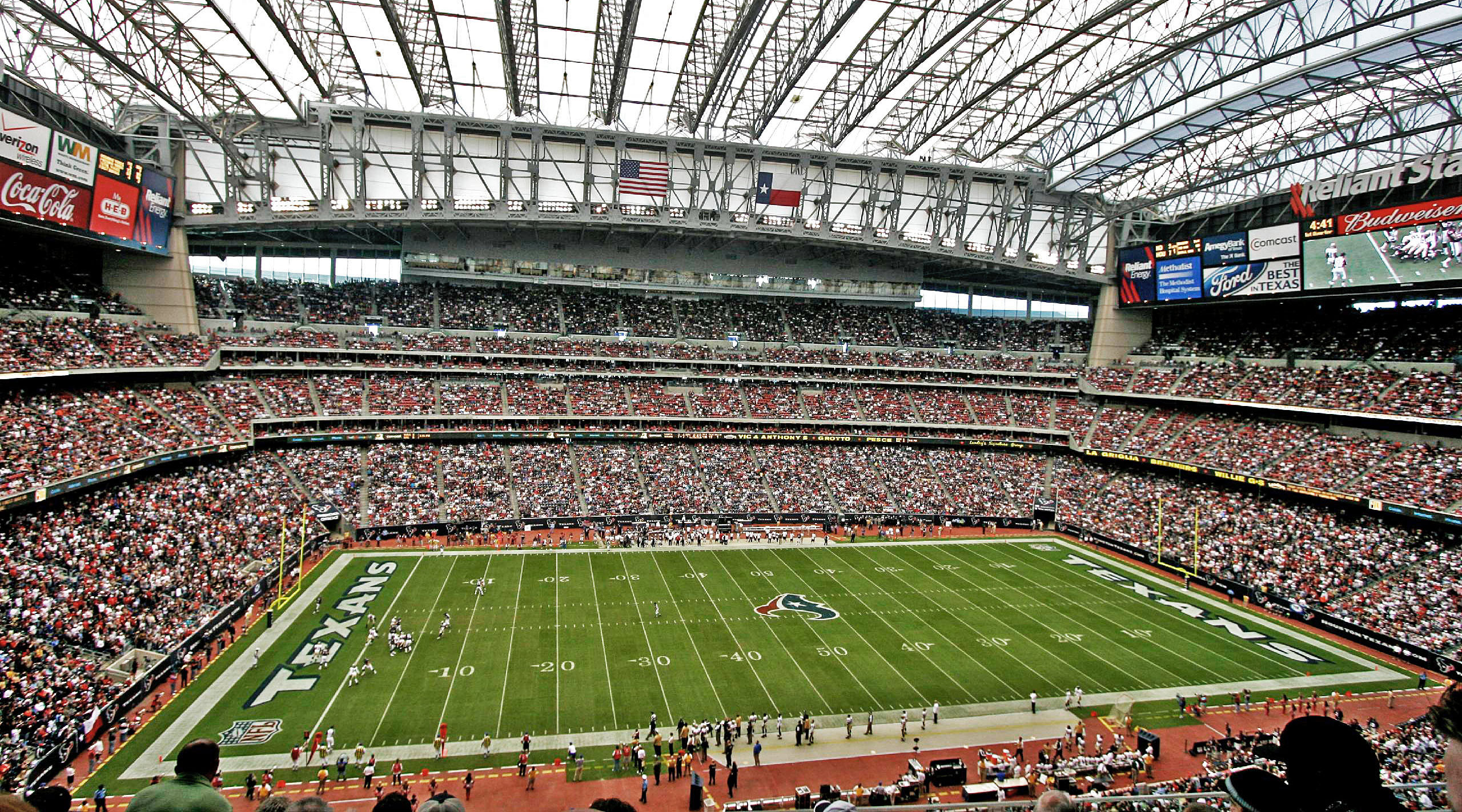
Reliant Stadium, home of the NFL's Texans

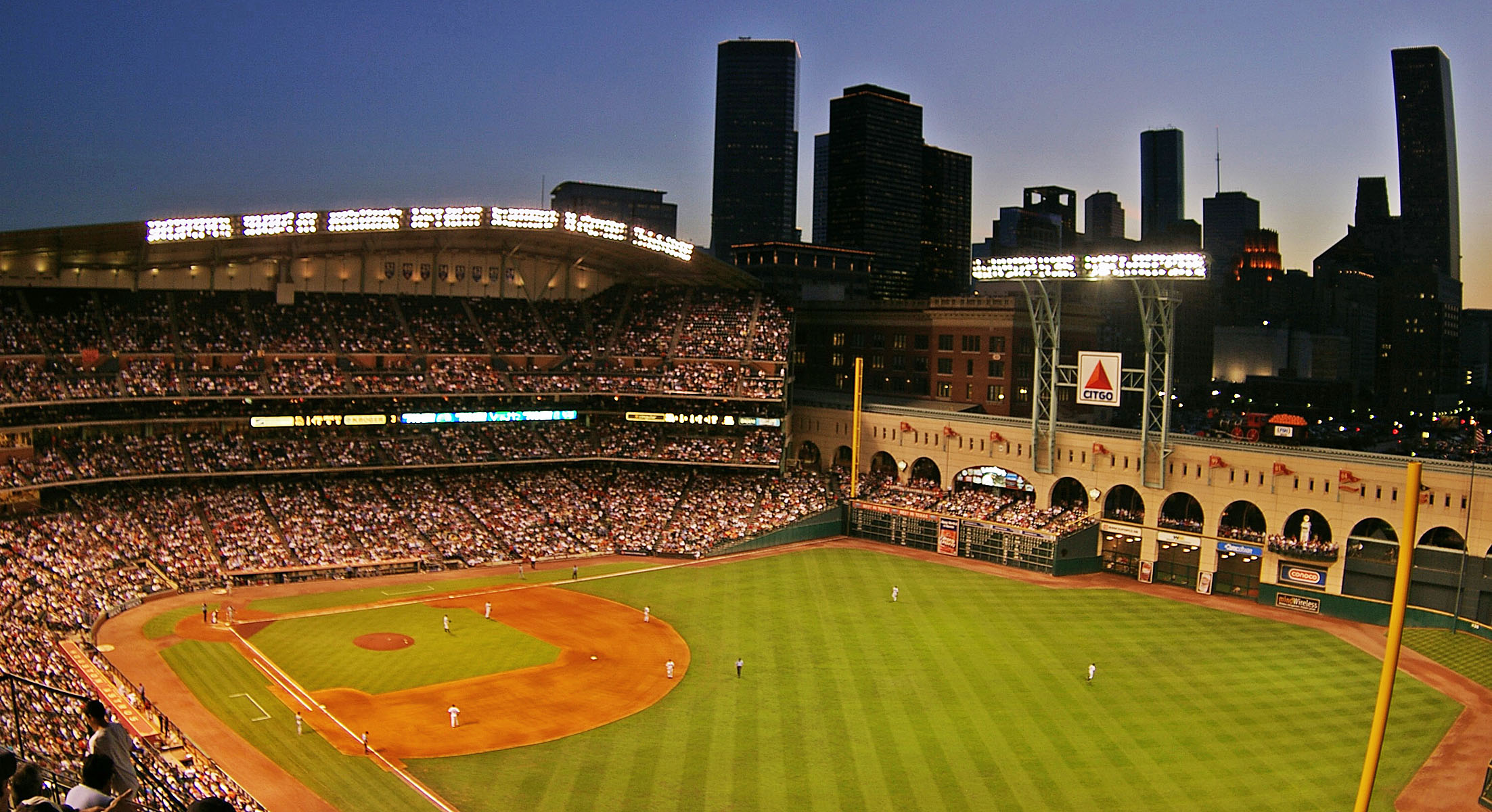
Daikin Park, home of MLB's Astros

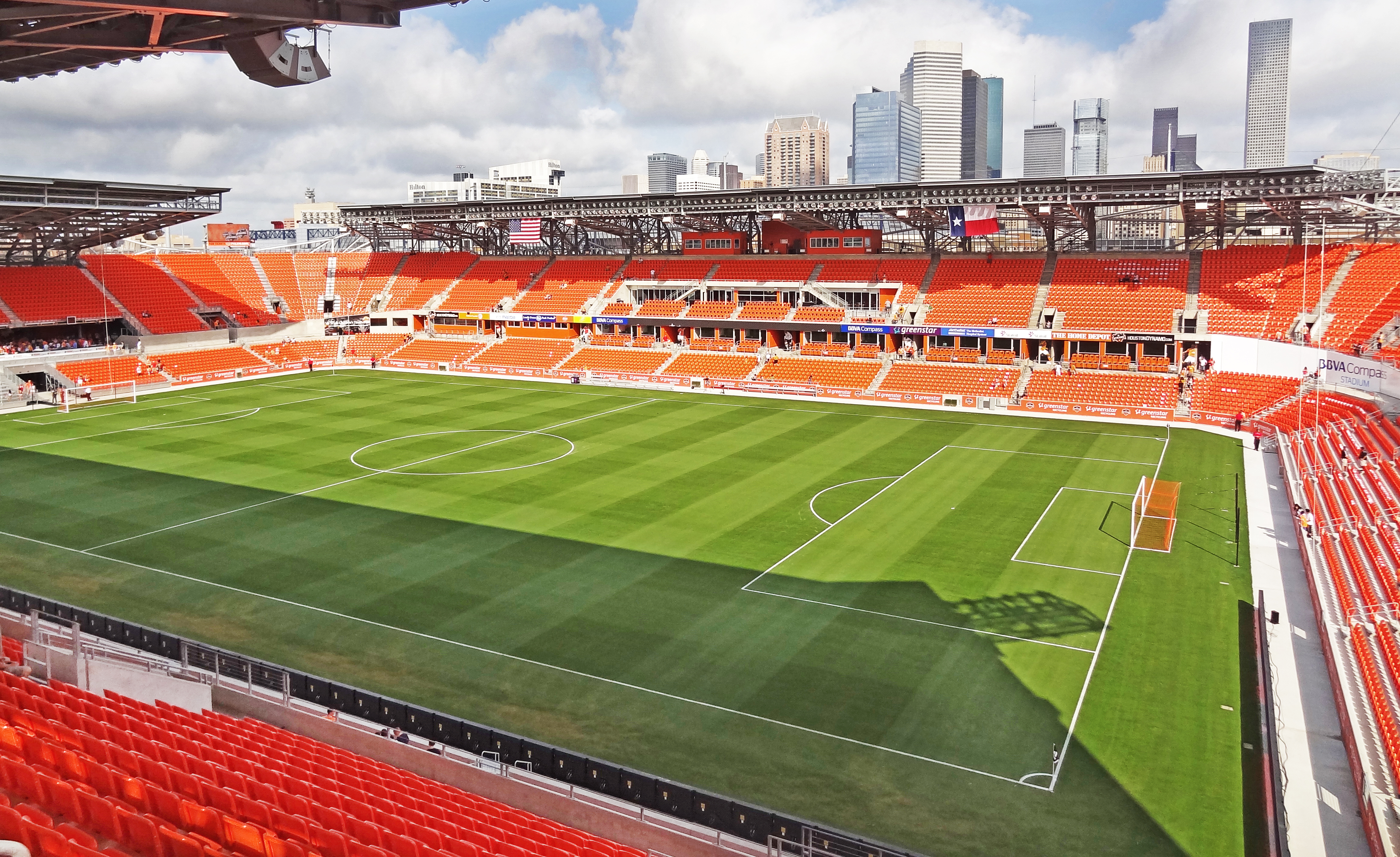
Shell Energy Stadium, home of MLS's Dynamo and NWSL's Dash

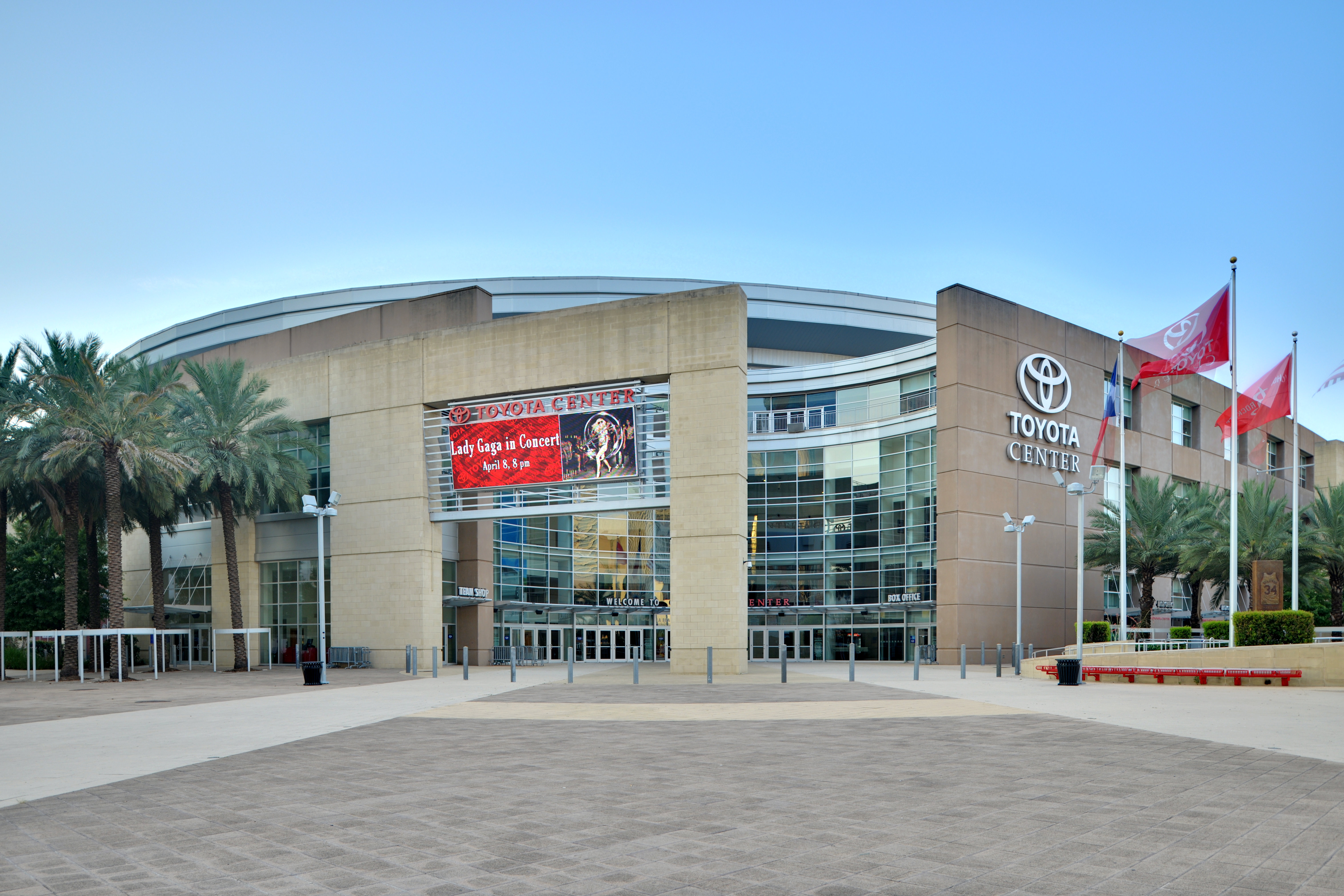
Toyota Center, home of the NBA's Rockets

The U.S. city of Houston and its metropolitan area have a rich sporting culture and the area residents are active in many spectator and participant sports. Spectators attend events including teams from four major professional sports leagues and collegiate sports. Participants enjoy activities from running in Memorial Park to sailing on Galveston Bay and Clear Lake. Several other sports are also available, including nearly a dozen fencing clubs, ranging from recreational clubs to elite competitive organizations.

== Major league sports ==
Location of major league teams in the Houston area

Houston has four major professional sports league teams: the Houston Astros (MLB), Houston Rockets (NBA), Houston Texans (NFL), and Houston Dynamo FC (MLS). Houston does not have an NHL team, however talks have been ongoing to bring one to the area.

The Astros have won two World Series titles in 2017 and 2022. In 2006, the Dynamo won the MLS Cup in their first year after moving from San Jose, California, and in 2007 became the first MLS franchise since 1997 to repeat a championship. Meanwhile, the Rockets similarly obtained two championships, winning back-to-back NBA titles in 1994 and 1995.

Daikin Park (home of the Astros) and Toyota Center (home of the Rockets) are located in Downtown Houston—contributing to an urban renaissance that has transformed Houston's centre into a day-and-night destination. Also, the city has the first domed stadium in the United States, now known as the Reliant Astrodome, and also holds the NFL's first retractable roof stadium—Reliant Stadium. Other facilities for major league teams in Houston include Shell Energy Stadium, a soccer-specific stadium.

Professional major league teams
Club	League	Sport	Venue	Founded	Titles	Attendance
Houston Texans	NFL	Football	Reliant Stadium	2002	0	71,644
Houston Astros	MLB	Baseball	Daikin Park	1962	2 (2017, 2022)	41,168
Houston Dynamo FC	MLS	Soccer	Shell Energy Stadium	2006	2 (2006, 2007)	20,117
Houston Dash	NWSL	Soccer	Shell Energy Stadium	2014	0	7,000
Houston Rockets	NBA	Basketball	Toyota Center	1967	2 (1994, 1995)	18,104
Houston Comets	WNBA	Basketball	Toyota Center	2027	0	12,000
Houston Rig Hands	BIG3	Basketball	Toyota Center	2024	0	None
LOVB Houston	LOVB	Volleyball	Fort Bend Epicenter	2023	0	2,000

== Other sports ==
Club	League	Sport	Venue	Founded	Titles
Bayou Warriors	UBA	Basketball		2012	0
Houston Bounty Hunters	NDL	Dodgeball		2009	0
Houston Energy	WFA	Women's football	Pearland Stadium	2000	4 (2000, 2001, 2002, 2018)
Houston FC	USL2	Soccer	San Jacinto College	2017	0
Houston Hornets	USARL	Rugby league		2011	0
Houston Lonestars	USAFL	Australian rules football		2005	0
Houston Mud Turtles	USAU	Ultimate Frisbee		2016	0
Houston Roller Derby	WFTDA	Roller derby	Bayou Music Center	2005	0
Houston Sparks	WBCBL	Women's basketball		2013	0
Houston Spirit	UBL	Basketball		2008	0
Houston Venom	MLRH	In-line hockey		2013	0
Houston Warriors	UBA	Basketball		2010	0
Houston Xperience	ABA	Basketball	Lone Star College-Kingwood	2011	0
Sugar Land Space Cowboys	PCL	Baseball	Constellation Field	2010	4 (2016, 2018, 2020, 2024)
Houston Legends	MLQ	Quidditch (real-life sport)		2016	0
Houston APL	APL	American football	Rice Stadium	2018	0
Houston Stampede	WFLA	Women's American football		2020	0
Houston Hurricanes	NGFFL	Flag football		2010	0
AHFC Royals	USL2	Soccer	British International School of Houston	2017	0
Houston Hurricanes	MiLC	Cricket	Prairie View Cricket Complex	2020	0
AC Houston Sur	USL2	Soccer		2021	0
Houston Havoc	UFA	Ultimate	SaberCats Stadium	2022	0
Lone Star Athletics	MiLC	Cricket	Moosa Stadium	2020	0
Houston Dynamo 2	MLSNP	Soccer	SaberCats Stadium	2021	0
Houston Power	AWFL	Women's American football		2010	0
Houston Doom	AWFL	Women's American football		2023	1 (2025)
Houston Bandits	AWFL	Women's American football		2026	0
Houston Bulls	NAHL	Ice hockey	Deep South Ice & Sports Center	2026	0
Houston Volts	PPL	Padel (sport)		2023	0
Houston Firehawks	USA Team Handball Nationals	Handball	Crossover Athletics	2004	0
Houston Hitmen	TBL	Boxing		2023	0
Houston Wranglers	PGF	Grappling		2026	0
Houston Bandits	UGL	Bodybuilding		2024	0
Houston Falcons	AIF	Indoor football		2026	0
Houston Hammers	MLP	Pickleball		2026	0

== Former teams ==
Houston was home to the now-defunct WNBA Comets from 1997 to 2008. The Comets won four consecutive WNBA Championships, which is still the most championships of any sports team in Houston, and the biggest title streak in Texas.

The AFL/NFL Oilers called Houston home from 1960 to 1997 before the team moved to Tennessee and became the Titans. The Oilers also provided the city with two AFL championships in 1960 and 1961, before the merger with the NFL.

The Houston Aeros of the International Hockey League and the American Hockey League existed in Houston from 1994 until 2013 when they were moved to become the Iowa Wild. They won the Turner Cup (IHL) in 1999 and the Calder Cup (AHL) in 2003.

The Houston Aeros of the World Hockey Association played in Houston from 1972 to 1978 until the WHA dissolved. They won the Avco World Trophy as champions of the WHA in 1974 and 1975.

Houston has three teams in World TeamTennis: The E-Z Riders in 1974, the Astro-Knots in 1982 and 1983, and the Wranglers from 2005 to 2007.

== College sports ==
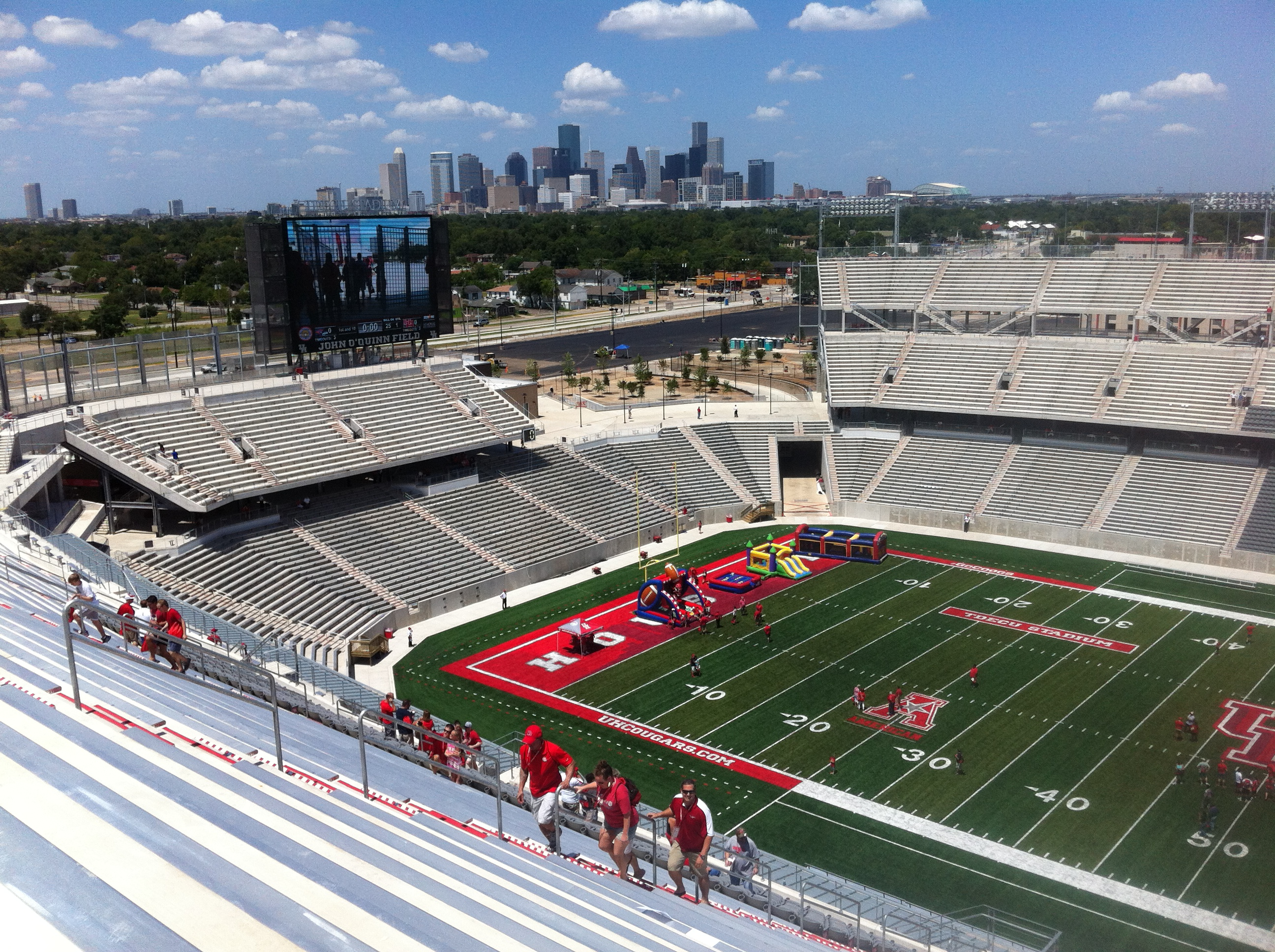
TDECU Stadium

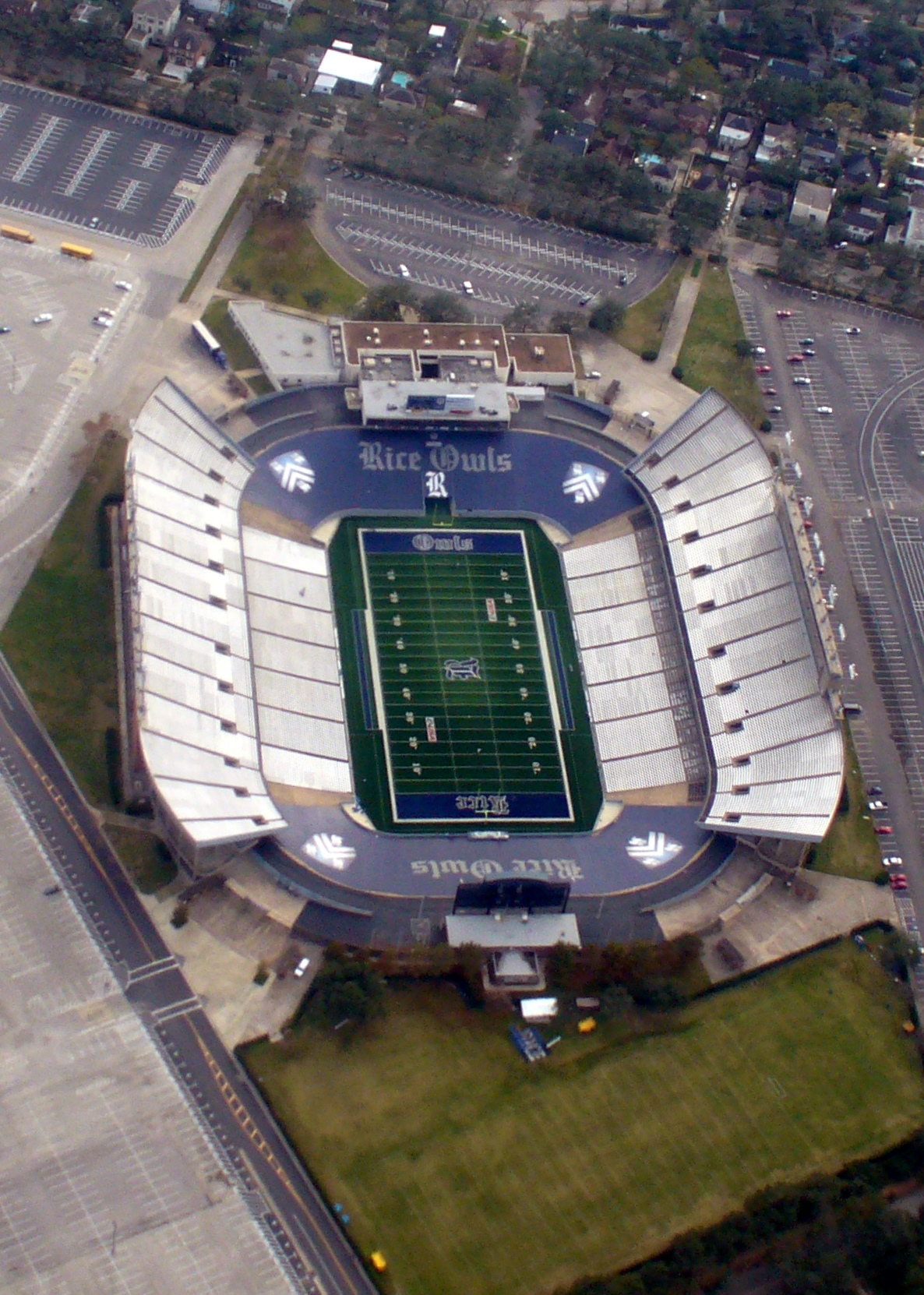
First Community Stadium

Four NCAA Division I college athletic programs play within the city of Houston, with the University of Houston as the sole member of a Power Four conference. A fifth, Prairie View A&M University, is located in the metropolitan area. A new venue, TDECU Stadium, opened in 2014 on the University of Houston campus at the former site of Robertson Stadium. Other college sports facilities in Houston include the Fertitta Center and First Community Stadium.

NCAA Division I programs
School	Nickname	Major venues	Conference
University of Houston	Cougars	TDECU Stadium, Fertitta Center	Big 12 (FBS)
Rice University	Owls	First Community Stadium, Tudor Fieldhouse	American (FBS)
Houston Christian University	Huskies	Husky Stadium, Sharp Gymnasium	Southland (FCS)
Texas Southern University	Tigers	Health and Physical Education Arena	SWAC (FCS)
Prairie View A&M University (in Prairie View)	Panthers	Panther Stadium at Blackshear Field, William Nicks Building	SWAC (FCS)

== Annual events ==
Houston hosts annual sporting events such as the PGA Tour's Houston Open, the college football Texas Bowl, and college baseball's Houston College Classic. Since 1971, Houston's two NCAA Division I FBS football teams, the Rice Owls and Houston Cougars, have faced off in the annual Bayou Bucket Classic. Since 1985, the Texas Southern Tigers and Prairie View A&M Panthers compete in the annual Labor Day Classic.

Every June since 2012, the U.S. national rugby team has played an international match against a top European team at BBVA Stadium, breaking attendance records for rugby matches in the U.S. The U.S. Men's Clay Court Championships, an ATP World Tour 250 series tournament, has been held in Houston since 2001.

From 1998 to 2001, the CART World Series held the Grand Prix of Houston auto race on downtown streets. CART's successor series, Champ Car, revived the race for 2006 and 2007 on the streets surrounding Reliant Park. The race was discontinued again in 2008, following Champ Car's merger with the rival IndyCar Series. The Grand Prix of Houston returned for the 2013 season. In motorcycling, the Astrodome hosted an AMA Supercross Championship round from 1974 to 2003 and Reliant Stadium since 2003.

Several annual sporting events are no longer held in Houston. The Virginia Slims of Houston was a women's tennis tournament held from 1970 to 1995 as part of the WTA Tour. The final official event of the LPGA golf season, the LPGA Tour Championship, was held in Houston in 2009 but moved to Orlando, Florida in 2010.

Event	Month	Sport	Venue	Established
Houston Marathon	January	Running	Convention Center and streets of Houston	1972
Houston College Classic	February	Baseball	Minute Maid Park	2001
Houston Livestock Show and Rodeo	February / March	Rodeo	NRG Park	1932
Houston Open	March	Golf	Golf Club of Houston	1946
U.S. Men's Clay Court Championships	April	Tennis	River Oaks Country Club	2001
U.S. International Rugby Match	June	Rugby	Shell Energy Stadium	2012
Texas Bowl	December	Football	Reliant Stadium	2006
Bayou Bucket Classic	Varies	Football	Rice Stadium, TDECU Stadium, or Reliant Stadium	1971
SWAC Championship Game	December	Football	Reliant Stadium	2013
SWAC Basketball Tournament	March	Basketball	Toyota Center	2013

== Other major events ==
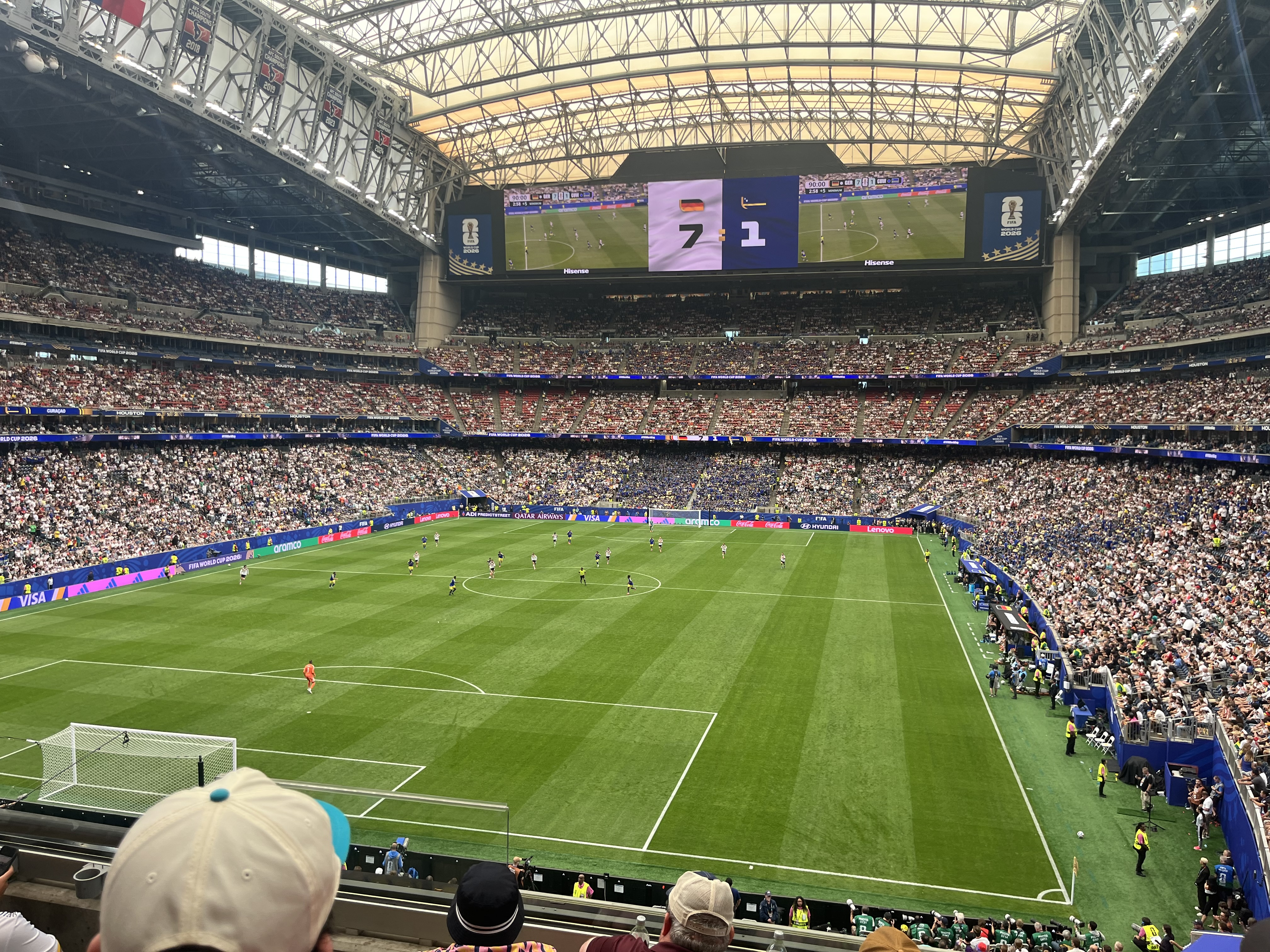
Inside NRG Stadium during the Germany vs. Curaçao match at the 2026 FIFA World Cup.

In addition to the events listed below, Houston hosted the Masters Grand Prix in 1976 and the Tennis Masters Cup in 2003 and 2004. Houston hosted multiple matches during the 2026 FIFA World Cup.

Event	Host	Sport	Venue	Date
UFC 69: Shootout	UFC	Mixed martial arts	Toyota Center	April 7, 2007
Wrestlemania X-Seven	WWE	Professional wrestling	Astrodome	April 1, 2001
Wrestlemania XXV	WWE	Professional wrestling	Reliant Stadium	April 5, 2009
Super Bowl VIII	NFL	Football	Rice Stadium	January 13, 1974
Super Bowl XXXVIII	NFL	Football	Reliant Stadium	February 1, 2004
2005 CONCACAF Gold Cup	CONCACAF	Soccer	Reliant Stadium	July 13 and 17, 2005
2005 World Series	MLB	Baseball	Minute Maid Park	October 2005
1968 MLB All-Star Game	MLB	Baseball	Astrodome	July 9, 1968
1986 MLB All-Star Game	MLB	Baseball	Astrodome	July 15, 1986
2004 MLB All-Star Game	MLB	Baseball	Minute Maid Park	July 13, 2004
2006 NBA All-Star Game	NBA	Basketball	Toyota Center	February 19, 2006
1971 NCAA Men's Final Four	NCAA	Basketball	Astrodome	March 25 and 27, 1971
2007 CONCACAF Gold Cup	CONCACAF	Soccer	Reliant Stadium	June 13 and 17, 2007
2009 CONCACAF Gold Cup	CONCACAF	Soccer	Reliant Stadium	July 9, 2009
2010 MLS All-Star Game	MLS	Soccer	Reliant Stadium	July 28, 2010
2011 CONCACAF Gold Cup	CONCACAF	Soccer	Reliant Stadium	June 22, 2011
2011 NCAA Men's Final Four	NCAA	Basketball	Reliant Stadium	April 2 and 4, 2011
Big 12 Championship Game	Big 12	Football	Reliant Stadium	December 2002 and 2005
2013 USA Women's Sevens	IRB	Rugby sevens	BBVA Compass Stadium	February 1–2, 2013
2013 NBA All-Star Game	NBA	Basketball	Toyota Center	February 17, 2013
2013 CONCACAF Gold Cup	CONCACAF	Soccer	BBVA Compass Stadium	July 15, 2013
2015 CONCACAF Gold Cup	CONCACAF	Soccer	BBVA Compass Stadium	July 11, 2015
2016 NCAA Men's Final Four	NCAA	Basketball	NRG Stadium	April 2 and 4, 2016
Copa América Centenario	CONMEBOL	Soccer	NRG Stadium	June 11,13, and 21, 2016
Super Bowl LI	NFL	Football	NRG Stadium	February 5, 2017
2017 CONCACAF Gold Cup	CONCACAF	Soccer	BBVA Compass Stadium	July 11, 2017
2017 World Series	MLB	Baseball	Minute Maid Park	October 2017
2018 U.S. Open Cup Final	USSF	Soccer	BBVA Compass Stadium	September 26, 2018
2019 CONCACAF Gold Cup	CONCACAF	Soccer	BBVA Stadium and NRG Stadium	June 21 and 29, 2019
2019 World Series	MLB	Baseball	Minute Maid Park	October 2019
2021 CONCACAF Gold Cup	CONCACAF	Soccer	BBVA Stadium and NRG Stadium	July 13, 17, 20 and 29, 2021
2021 World Series	MLB	Baseball	Minute Maid Park	October/November 2021
2022 World Series	MLB	Baseball	Minute Maid Park	October/November 2022
2023 NCAA Men's Final Four	NCAA	Basketball	NRG Stadium	April 1 and 3, 2023
2023 CONCACAF Gold Cup	CONCACAF	Soccer	NRG Stadium and Shell Energy Stadium	June 25, and July 1, and 4, 2023
2024 College Football Playoff National Championship	NCAA	Football	NRG Stadium	January 8, 2024
2024 Copa América	CONMEBOL	Soccer	NRG Stadium	June 22, 24, and July 4, 2024
2025 CONCACAF Gold Cup	CONCACAF	Soccer	NRG Stadium and Shell Energy Stadium	June 14–July 6, 2025
2026 World Baseball Classic	WBSC	Baseball	Daikin Park	March 5–17, 2026
2026 FIFA World Cup	FIFA	Soccer	NRG Stadium	June 14, 17, 20, 23, 26, 29 and July 4, 2026

== Intramural sports ==
Houston has a cricket league for adults which, in 2016, had 30 teams and with the majority of players being immigrants from cricket-oriented countries; this league was established in the 1970s. In 2013 the first cricket club for children, Katy Youth Cricket, was established. The first youth league, Triggers Colts Cricket League, was established in 2014, as was the Sugar Land Youth Cricket Club and the North West Children's Cricket Club. In 2015 Energy Corridor Cricket, also a children's club, was established. In September 2018, a cricket complex in Prairie View was scheduled to open.

In 2020, during the COVID-19 pandemic in Texas, there was a renewed interest in roller skating in Houston.
