= Ferncroft Country Club =

- Location within Massachusetts
- Type: Country club
- Location: Essex County, Massachusetts
- Coordinates: 42°36′12″N 70°58′41″W
- Area: 287 acres (116.14 ha; 0.45 sq mi)
- Elevation: 129 feet (39 m)
- Opened: 1970
- Founder: Joe Mass
- Designer: Robert Trent Jones (championship golf course)
- Operator: Carlisle Capital
- Parking: On premises
- Website: www.ferncroftcc.com

Ferncroft Country Club is a country club owned and operated by Affinity Management, located in Essex County, Massachusetts with portions of the club's grounds in the towns of Middleton and Topsfield. The club's entrance is at 10 Village Road in Middleton.

== Facilities ==
=== Golf facilities ===
The club's championship golf course was designed by Robert Trent Jones. It hosted the LPGA's Boston Five Classic from 1980 through 1990. The total yardage of the course from the back tees is 6,632, and it plays at a par of 72 for men and 73 for ladies. The 543-yard par-5 18th hole is regarded by many, including North Shore Golf and Northshore Magazine, as one of the best finishing holes in Massachusetts.

The club also has an executive course, a practice range and short-game area. Instruction is available.

=== Tennis courts ===
The club has four clay courts and four hardcourts, all of which are outdoors. Private lessons, clinics and junior programs are offered.

The Boston Lobsters of World TeamTennis played their home matches at the club from 2008 through 2012. Notable players appearing at the club in that time were Serena & Venus Williams, Anna Kournikova, and Martina Navratilova.

=== Other facilities ===
The club has a pool, a fitness room, and a full-service snack bar. The clubhouse has four rooms that are available for hosting weddings and other catered events, including a ballroom, roof deck party space. The Bell & Cannon Room near the ballroom is home to a reclaimed fireplace mantle made by Paul Revere's foundry for the family brownstone in Boston. It was donated by Ferncroft member John Driscoll.
