= Gulf Coast Hockey League =

The Gulf Coast Hockey League was a short-lived minor professional ice hockey league in the Gulf Coast region of the United States. The league existed for the 2001–02 season, before folding. Texarkana won both the regular season and postseason championships.

== Teams ==
- Dallas Sabres
- Houston Blast
- Little Rock Wildcats (withdrew before playing a game)
- Texarkana Bandits

== Standings ==
Season	GP	W	L	T	Pts	Playoff results
Texarkana	30	28	2	0	56	Champions
Dallas	29	11	17	1	23	Runner-Up
Houston	24	2	21	1	5	Semifinal
