= Houston Lightning =

- Founded: 2009
- Folded: 2010
- League: Southern Indoor Football League
- Team history: Houston Lightning (2010)
- Based in: Houston, Texas
- Arena: Reliant Arena
- Colors: Black, Gold, White
- President: Wilbert Brown
- Head coach: Bryan Blake
- Championships: 0

The Houston Lightning were an indoor football team which was to begin Southern Indoor Football League play in 2010. Based in Houston, Texas, their home arena was announced as the Reliant Arena.

The Lightning were to be the second indoor/arena team to play in the city of Houston, and the fourth to play in the Greater Houston area. Previously, the city had the Houston Thunderbears (previously known as the Texas Terror) of the Arena Football League from 1996 until 2001. In addition, Greater Houston was previously home to the Texas Copperheads of the National Indoor Football League and later af2 from 2006 until 2008 (in the NIFL, the team was the Katy Copperheads), as well as the Katy Ruff Riders of the Intense Football League from 2007 until the team moved to the Indoor Football League and the city of Abilene after the 2008 season.

The Lightning's logo is one of the few in American sports to contain a verse from the Bible; the verse cited is Isaiah 40:31: "They that hope in the LORD will renew their strength, they will soar as with eagles' wings; They will run and not grow weary, walk and not grow faint." (NAB)

On March 10, 2010, the Lightning announced that they were suspending operations, claiming that the arena (unnamed in the announcement) had reneged on a lease agreement, and that there wasn't time to find an alternate home.
