= Houston Blast =

- City: Houston, Texas
- League: Gulf Coast Hockey League
- Founded: 2001
- Folded: 2002
- Home arena: Sharpstown Ice Center
- Colors: Blue and Silver
- General manager: Derek Eichele

The Houston Blast were an American minor professional ice hockey team located in Houston, Texas. The franchise existed for one season in the Gulf Coast Hockey League before folding when the league dissolved.

== History ==
Houston was one of the founding teams of the Gulf Coast Hockey League and played in the inaugural match on October 19, 2001. However, not much went right for the franchise afterwards. Houston proceeded to win just 2 games all season, finishing last in the 3-team league. Despite this, Houston did make the postseason, but a 0–10 loss proved just how far behind they were.

Though the league initially planned to return for a second season, the GCHL disbanded without much fanfare over the summer and all three existing teams permanently suspended operations.

== Season-by-season record ==
Season	GP	W	L	T	Pts	Place	Playoffs
2001–02	24	2	21	1	5	3rd	Semifinal
