= Sportime Harbor Island =

Tennis club in Village of Mamaroneck, New York

- Location within New York
- Type: Athletic club
- Motto: Sportime... Fitness for Real Life.
- Location: Village of Mamaroneck, New York
- Coordinates: 40°56′42″N 73°43′55″W
- Elevation: 13 feet (4 m)
- Founder: Claude Okin
- Operator: Sportime NY
- Open: Memorial Day through Labor Day 8:00 am–8:00 pm Rest of the year: Monday through Thursday 8:00 am–11:00 pm Friday 7:30 am–10:00 pm Saturday and Sunday 7:00 am–10:00 pm Hours vary on major holidays
- Parking: On premises
- Public transit: Bee-Line Bus System Route 60 at Palmer Avenue and Mamaroneck Avenue; Metro-North Railroad New Haven Line Mamaroneck station
- Website: www.sportimeny.com/Harbor-Island

Sportime Harbor Island is a tennis club owned and operated by Sportime NY, located in the Village of Mamaroneck, New York inside Harbor Island Park. The club has eight outdoor red clay tennis courts that are bubbled during colder times of the year. It also has a lounge and a pro shop. The club offers private lessons, adult leagues, tennis kinetics programs, elite tournament training, a 10-and-under tennis program, a match play program, tennis parties and a children's summer camp.

The New York Sportimes of World TeamTennis, of which Sportime NY was the majority owner, played their home matches at the club from 2003 through 2008. A temporary stadium with a seating capacity of 1,843 spectators was erected for Sportimes matches. During their residency at Sportime Harbor Island, the Sportimes won the 2005 King Trophy as World TeamTennis champions. In 2009, the team relocated its home matches to another facility owned and operated by Sportime NY on Randall's Island in New York City.
