= Houston Wranglers =

Professional tennis team based in Houston, Texas, U.S.

- Sport: Team tennis
- Founded: February 9, 2005
- Folded: July 25, 2007
- League: World TeamTennis
- Conference: Western
- Team history: Houston Wranglers; 2005–2007
- Based in: Houston, Texas
- Stadium: Westside Tennis Club (capacity: 5,240)
- Colors: Yellow, black and storm dust
- Owner: Jim and Linda McIngvale
- Head coach: Thomas Blake
- General manager: Bronwyn Greer
- Championships: None
- Conference titles: None
- Playoff berths: None

The Houston Wranglers was a professional tennis team based in Houston, Texas, United States competing in World TeamTennis (WTT). The team made its debut in the 2005 season, and folded after the 2007 season, citing a lack of fan interest. The Wranglers never had a winning season and never qualified for the WTT playoffs.

== Team history ==
=== Inaugural season ===
After many years of supporting and sponsoring local sports teams and events in Houston, Jim and Linda McIngvale, owners of Gallery Furniture and the Westside Tennis Club, founded a new franchise to bring professional team tennis back to Houston for the first time since the Houston Astro-Knots folded following the 1983 season. The team was to play its home matches at the Westside Tennis Club, home at the time to the U.S. Men's Clay Court Championships. Initially, the team was identified simply as Houston. The name Wranglers was announced a few weeks later.

At the 2005 WTT Draft, the Wranglers selected former world number 1 female player Steffi Graf as a marquee player and Mardy Fish, a member of the 2004 United States Davis Cup team, as a roster-exempt player. Ashley Fisher, Edina Gallovits, Ansley Cargill and Ryan Newport were drafted as roster players. Immediately following the draft, the Wranglers acquired Tommy Haas in a trade with the St. Louis Aces in exchange for undisclosed consideration. After being selected by the Wranglers in the draft, Graf said, "Playing for Houston and owners Jim and Linda McIngvale will be special. I have wonderful memories of winning a title in Houston on my last visit there, so I am looking forward to playing in front of those fans again." Graf, who had not played competitive tennis since 1999, agreed to play for the Wranglers out of gratitude for the support the McIngvales had given to the Agassi Foundation, a charity run by her and her husband, Andre Agassi.

The Wranglers signed former Houston Rockets basketball star John Lucas, who also had experience as a WTT player, as their head coach. The Wranglers also signed a broadcasting deal with KNWS-TV Channel 51 to have all their home matches televised locally.

As is customary in WTT, the Wranglers encouraged all their fans to enjoy this brand of tennis by making noise and cheering on the team. The Wranglers were the only team in the league with cheerleaders. The Wranglers' debut was a home loss to the Aces on July 6, 2005, in front of an enthusiastic crowd of 3,628 fans. Haas had been scheduled to play in the Wranglers' opener. However, he suffered an injury at Wimbledon that forced him to retire during his first-round match against Janko Tipsarević. Haas never appeared in a match for the Wranglers.

Graf made her only appearance of the season in a home match against the Sacramento Capitals on July 12, 2005. Her star power along with Anna Kournikova and Elena Likhovtseva, then ranked number 16 in the world, playing for the Capitals drew a paid crowd of 4,862. Graf lost the women's singles set to Likhovtseva in a tiebreaker, and the Capitals handed the Wranglers their sixth straight loss to start the season, 20–18, in overtime. The Wranglers first ever victory came the following evening, at home against the Boston Lobsters, 23–22, in a super tiebreaker. The Wranglers finished the 2005 season with 3 wins and 11 losses, WTT's worst record.

=== A remade roster, but same results ===
Since the Wranglers had WTT's worst record in 2005, they selected first in each round of the 2006 draft. The Wranglers traded the first overall pick in the draft to the Newport Beach Breakers in exchange for the 11th pick in the first round of the Marquee Player Draft plus financial consideration. The Breakers used the top pick to select Pete Sampras, who was immediately scheduled to play a road match in Houston. The Wranglers passed on making a selection with the 11th pick, leaving Steffi Graf unprotected, and they did not select a marquee player in the second round. Venus Williams, who had been acquired by the Philadelphia Freedoms in a trade, was scheduled to play in Houston. In the Roster-Exempt Player Draft, the Wranglers protected Mardy Fish in the first round and selected Anna-Lena Grönefeld in the second round. In the first round of the Roster Player Draft, the Wranglers selected Jan-Michael Gambill and left Ashley Fisher unprotected. In the second round, they chose Ahsha Rolle and left Edina Gallovits unprotected. In the third round, the Wranglers selected Bryanne Stewart and left Ansley Cargill unprotected. The Wranglers used their final pick on Johan Landsberg and left Ryan Newport unprotected. By the end of the draft, Fish was the only returning player from the previous year's squad. None of the players left unprotected by the Wranglers were chosen by other teams.

On May 22, 2006, the Wranglers announced they had hired Jim Mavity to coach the team. Mavity was the tennis coach at James E. Taylor High School in Katy, Texas. Mavity, 67 years old at the time, held the state record for guiding his team to the Texas final four 11 times. He had previously won multiple coach of the year honors including the 2003 award presented by the National Federation of State High School Associations. Since the WTT season took place during the summer break, Mavity did not leave his high school coaching job.

Landsberg experienced problems with his visa and was unable to play for the Wranglers. The team signed doubles specialist Graydon Oliver to replace him just before the start of the season. Jan-Michael Gambill's younger brother, Torrey, also appeared in matches for the Wranglers as a substitute player. The new coach and remade roster did not change the results. The Wranglers repeated their 3 win and 11 loss performance and again finished with WTT's worst record. Two of the Wranglers' three victories came against the 2006 WTT champion Freedoms.

=== Final season ===
The Wranglers again passed on making any selections at the 2007 WTT Marquee Player Draft on February 7, 2007. However, a visit to Houston by Anna Kournikova was scheduled. At the WTT Roster Draft on March 27, 2007, the Wranglers did not protect roster-exempt players Mardy Fish and Anna-Lena Grönefeld. They did protect Jan-Michael Gambill and Bryanne Stewart in the first and third rounds, respectively. In the second round, the Wranglers selected Mashona Washington and left Ahsha Rolle unprotected. With their final pick, the Wranglers chose Goran Dragicevic and left Graydon Oliver and Torrey Gambill unprotected. Thomas Blake was named new head coach of the Wranglers. Bronwyn Greer replaced Michael Kopp as the team's general manager.

The Wranglers struggled even more in 2007, than they had in their first two seasons. Their only victory came at home over the St. Louis Aces, 23–19, in overtime. Jan-Michael Gambill clinched the match in overtime after losing the final set of men's singles. Following a 1 win and 13 loss season, the Wranglers announced that the team was folding. Owner Linda McIngvale said, "This is not the right type of community for the Wranglers. We're just too big of a city with too many options. There's a jillion other things to do in the summertime in Houston." The team sold fewer than half of the 4,500 tickets it made available for the match that featured Kournikova playing for the visitors. Late in the 2007 season, attendance at Wranglers' home matches was typically less than 1,000.

== Season-by-season records ==
The following table shows regular season records, playoff results and titles won by the Houston Wranglers.

Year	W	L	PCT	Playoff result	Titles won
2005	3	11	.214	Did not qualify	
2006	3	11	.214	Did not qualify	
2007	1	13	.071	Did not qualify	
Totals	7	35	.167	All Playoff Matches: 0 wins, 0 losses, –	None

== Hall of Fame players ==
Steffi Graf is the only player enshrined in the International Tennis Hall of Fame who played for the Houston Wranglers.

== Final roster ==
- (United States) Thomas Blake – Coach
- (United States) Goran Dragicevic
- (United States) Jan-Michael Gambill
- (Australia) Bryanne Stewart
- (United States) Mashona Washington

== See also ==
- Sports in Houston
- List of former professional sports teams in Houston
- List of defunct Texas sports teams
