= Ray & Joan Kroc Corps Community Centers =

Subsidiary of The Salvation Army

- Ray & Joan Kroc Corps Community Centers
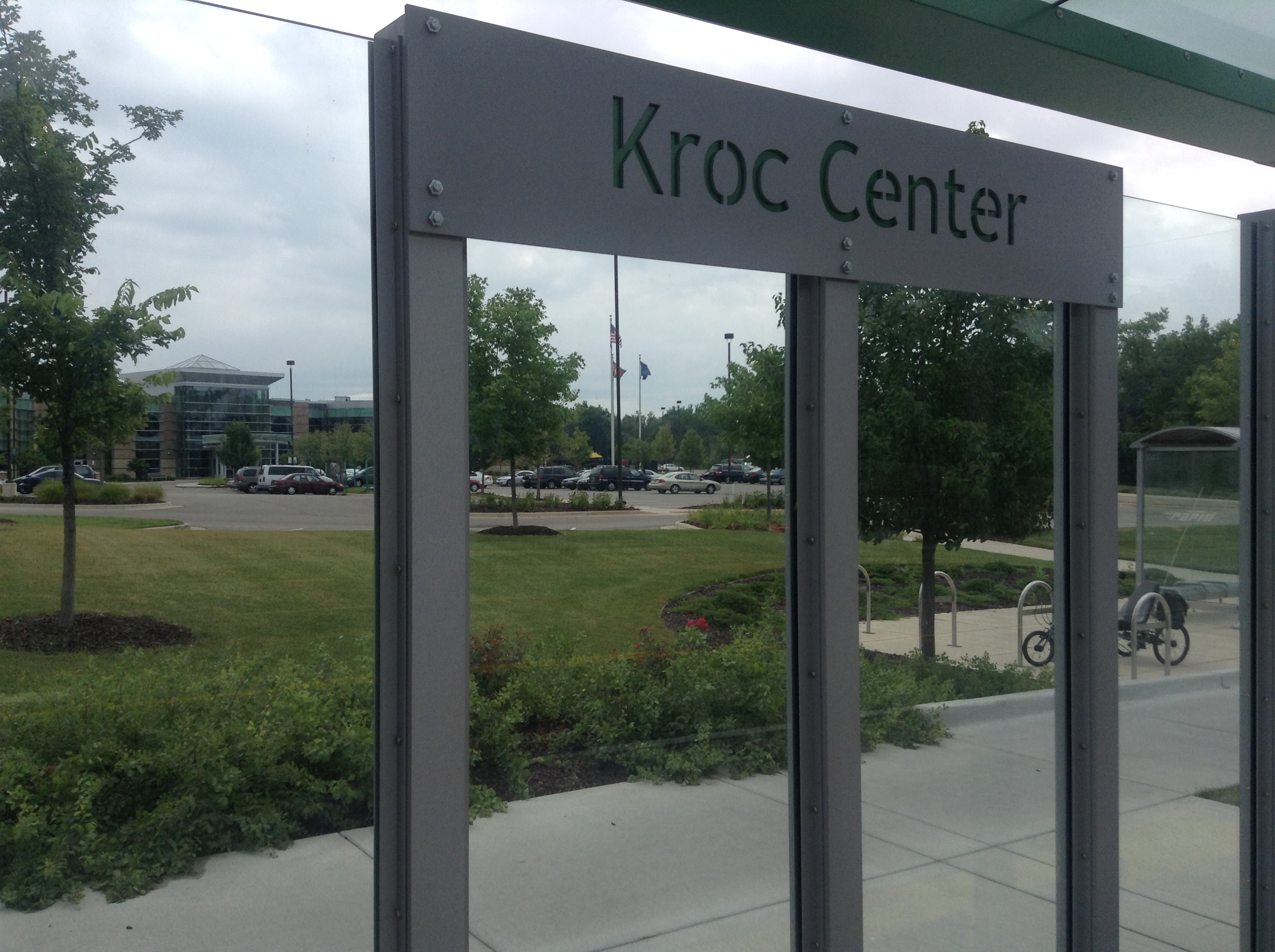
- Kroc Center Station, Silver Line, Grand Rapids, Michigan
- Nickname: Kroc Center
- Region served: United States
- Parent organization: Salvation Army
- Website: kroccenter.org

The Ray & Joan Kroc Corps Community Centers, or Kroc Centers, is a group of community centers run by the Salvation Army.

The centres have been funded by Joan Kroc, the widow of McDonald's restaurants executive Ray Kroc.

== Kroc Center background ==
In 1998, Joan Kroc donated $87 million (equivalent to $172 million in 2025) to the Salvation Army to build and endow the first Kroc Center in San Diego, California, on what was an abandoned grocery store and other empty land. The center opened in June 2002. Currently, it is home to the American Basketball Association's San Diego Wildcats.

Upon her death in 2003, Kroc bequeathed $1.5 billion (equivalent to $3 billion in 2025) to The Salvation Army solely for the purpose of establishing centers of opportunity, education, recreation and inspiration throughout the United States to be known as "Salvation Army Ray and Joan Kroc Corps Community Centers".

The Kroc Center in San Francisco, California, broke ground in June 2006, and the Kroc Center in Atlanta, Georgia, formally known as The Salvation Army Ray and Joan Kroc Center: A Center for Worship and Education, broke ground in 2007. The San Francisco Kroc Center received $53 million (equivalent to $105 million in 2025).

As of 2023, there are 25 Kroc Centers across 20 US states, as well as one in Puerto Rico.

== Kroc Center work ==
The centers work to reach their local community with services including sports, health education, music, youth groups, counselling, financial literacy classes, food distribution and emergency help. Each center also holds at least one church service every week.

Every year about five million people visit the Kroc Centers.
