= 599 Lexington Avenue =

Office skyscraper in Manhattan, New York

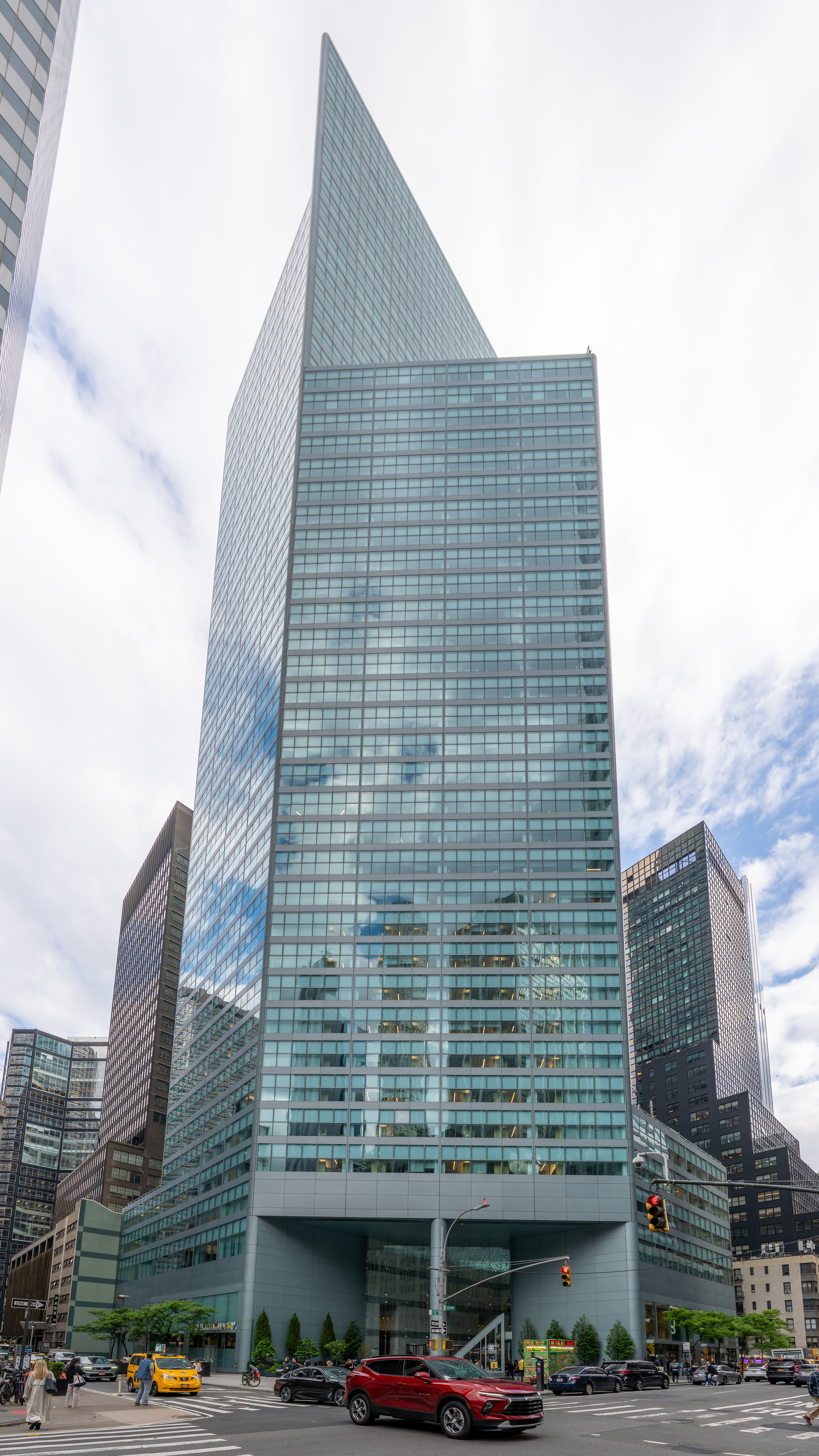
- 2026

General information
- Type: Office
- Location: Midtown Manhattan, New York City
- Coordinates: 40.75784°N 73.97073°W
- Construction started: 1984
- Completed: 1986
- Opening: 1986
- Cost: $300 million
- Owner: Boston Properties

Height
- Roof: 653 ft (199 m)

Technical details
- Floor count: 50
- Lifts/elevators: 24

Design and construction
- Architects: Edward Larrabee Barnes and John MY Lee Architects
- Developer: Boston Properties

599 Lexington Avenue is a 653-foot (199 m) tall, 50-story skyscraper in Midtown Manhattan, New York City, designed by Edward Larrabee Barnes/John MY Lee Architects. It was the first building constructed by Mortimer Zuckerman and his company Boston Properties in New York City. The site was acquired for $84 million in 1984, and completed in 1986. The building is adjacent to the Citigroup Center and is considered a well-designed contextual partner to the area.

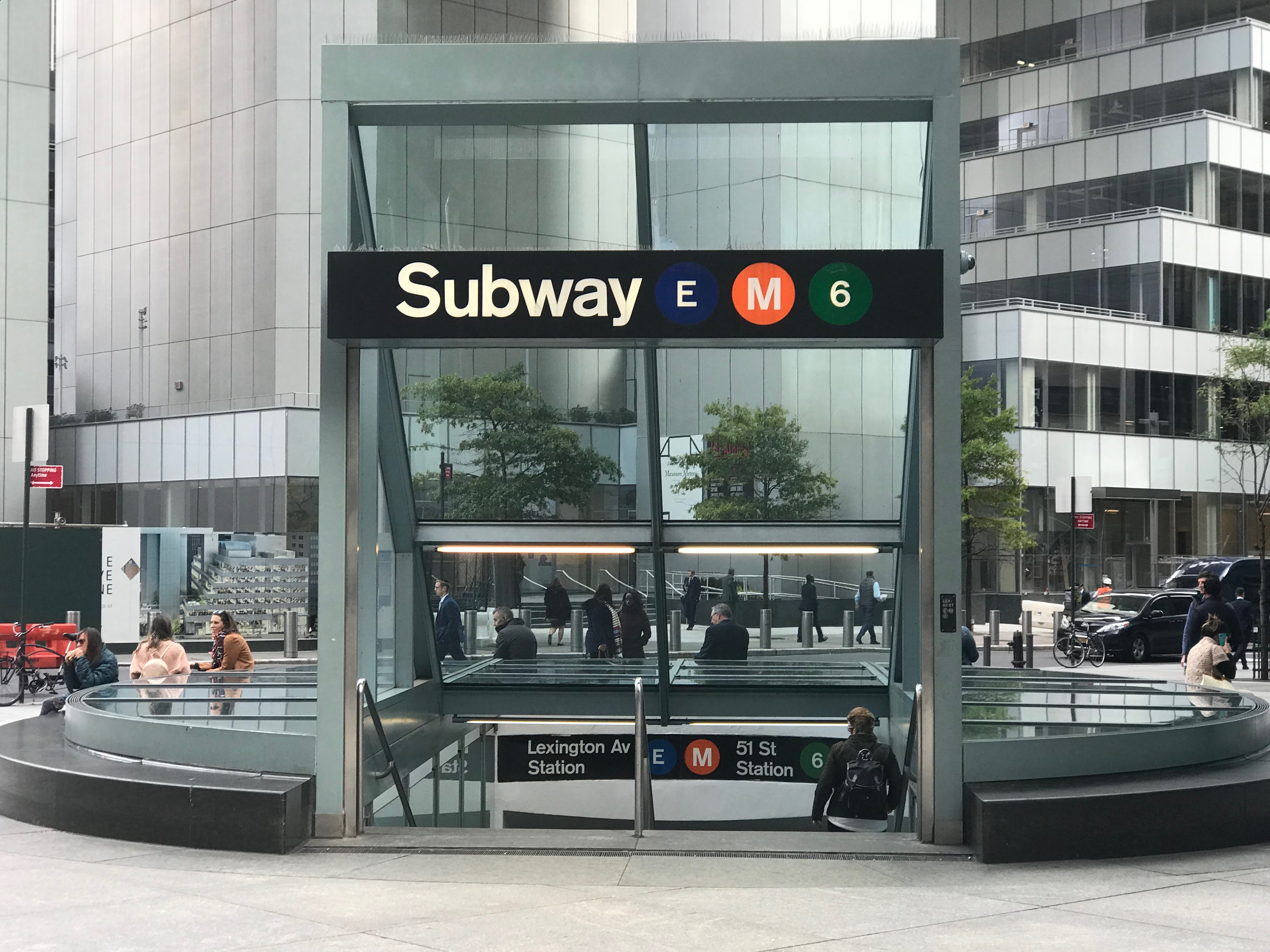
Entrance to the Lexington Avenue/51st Street subway station

It is tied with both of the Silver Towers as the 104th tallest building in New York City. The lobby contains Frank Stella's Salto nel Mio Sacco. The property also contains an entry to the Lexington Avenue/51st Street station of the New York City Subway, served by the 6, <6>, E, F, and <F> trains. The entryway to the station features a sloped glass canopy. The building was completed without an anchor tenant.

In 2016, FXFowle Architects completed a remodel of the interior lobby, hallways, and elevators to better light the Stella artwork and brighten the lobby space. The project's lead architect Bruce Fowle was a protegé of Edward Larrabee Barnes, the building's original designer. Advertising firm Pentagram assisted with the graphic design of the way-finding information.

== Awards ==
599 Lexington Avenue was awarded the University of Virginia's Thomas Jefferson Award for Architecture in 1981.

== Tenants ==
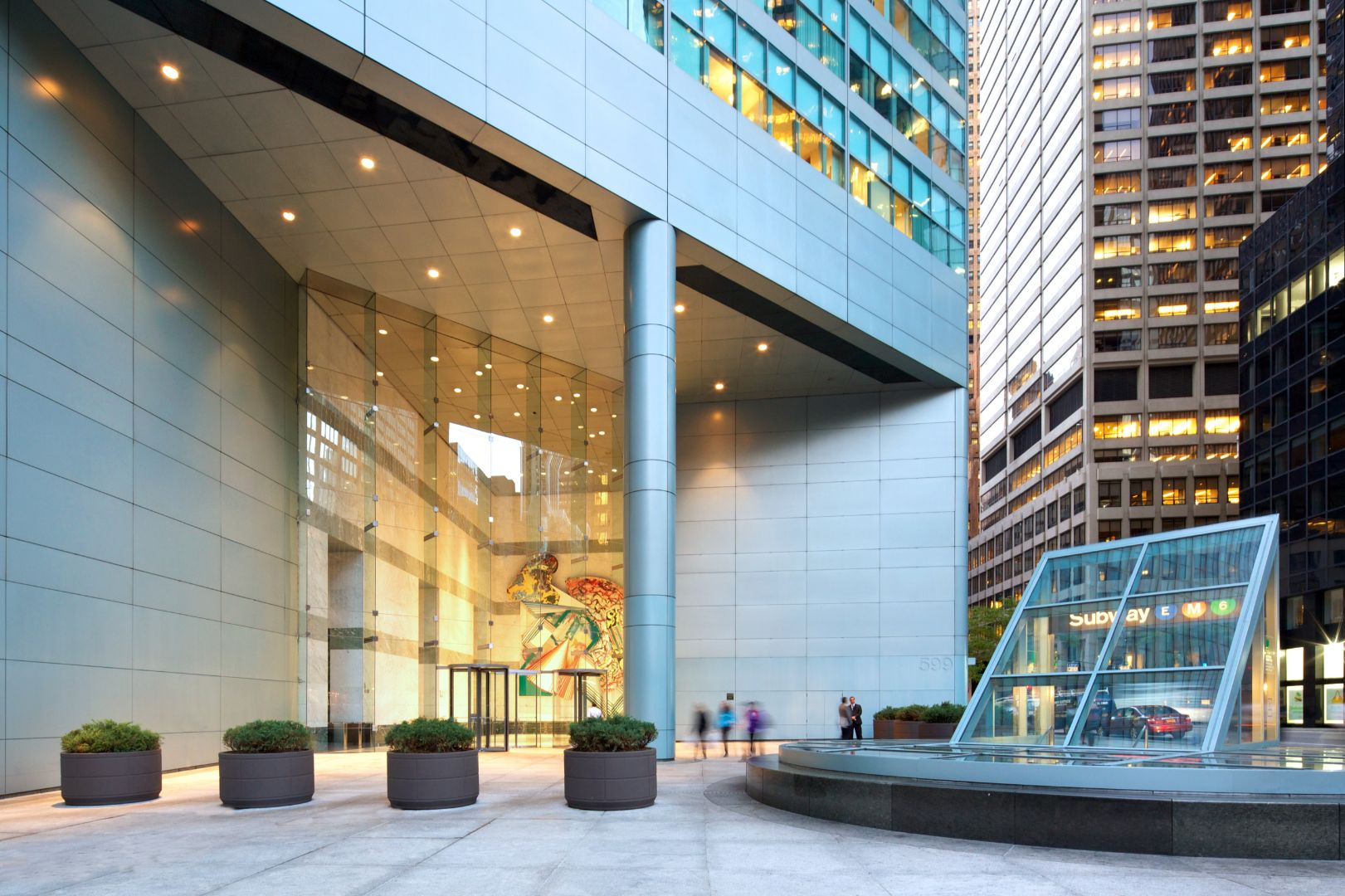
Entrance

- A&O Shearman (the major tenant; expanded holdings by six floors in 2002)
- Cowen Group
- K&L Gates
- Welsh, Carson, Anderson & Stowe (17th floor & entire 18th floor), having moved from 320 Park Avenue
- Reed Smith (22nd floor)
- Commonwealth Bank North American Branch (30th floor)
- Atreaus Capital, Cogent Partners and Istithmar World (each occupying part of the 38th floor)
- Cornerstone Research (41st floor & entire 42nd, 43rd and 44th floors)
- Retromer Therapeutics (47th floor)

== See also ==
- List of tallest buildings in New York City
