= Edward Larrabee Barnes =

American architect (1915–2004)

- Born: April 22, 1915; Chicago, Illinois, US
- Died: September 22, 2004 (aged 89); Cupertino, California, US
- Education: Milton Academy; Harvard College; Harvard Graduate School of Design
- Occupation: Architect

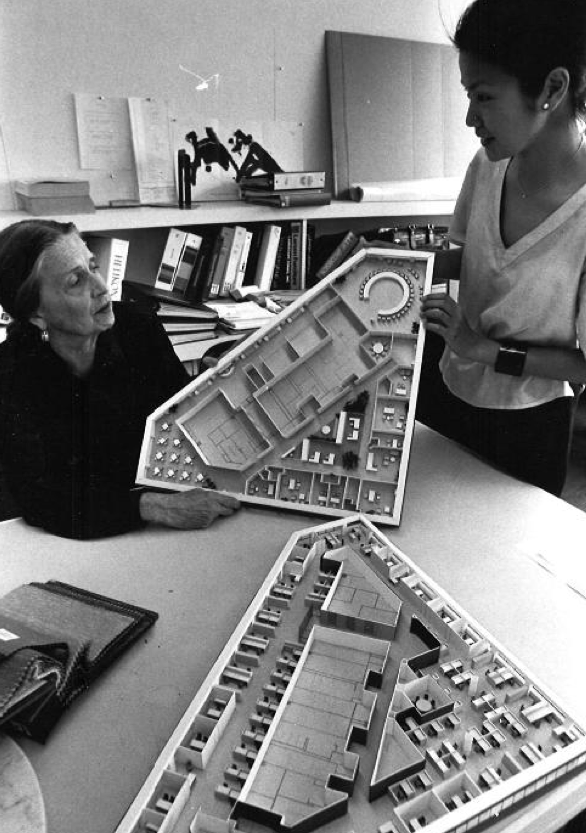
Mary Barnes, Edward Barnes' wife, was an integral member of the design team. Working on 590 Madison Avenue, interior designs with Toshiko Mori in 1979.

Edward Larrabee Barnes (April 22, 1915 – September 22, 2004) was an American architect. His work was characterized by the "fusing [of] Modernism with vernacular architecture and understated design." Barnes was best known for his adherence to strict geometry, simple monolithic shapes and attention to material detail. Among his best-known projects are the Haystack School, Christian Theological Seminary, Dallas Museum of Art, the Walker Art Center, 599 Lexington Avenue, the Thurgood Marshall Federal Judiciary Building, and the IBM Building at 590 Madison Avenue.

== Early life and education ==
Barnes was born in Chicago, Illinois, into a family he described as "incense-swinging High Episcopalians", consisting of Cecil Barnes, a lawyer, and Margaret Helen Ayer, recipient of a Pulitzer Prize for the novel Year of Grace. Barnes graduated from Harvard in 1938 after studying English and Art History before switching to architecture, then taught at his alma mater Milton Academy, before returning to Harvard for further studies under Walter Gropius and Marcel Breuer. He graduated from the Harvard Graduate School of Design in 1942 and served in the Navy during World War II. After the war he worked for Henry Dreyfuss in Los Angeles designing prototypes for mass-produced homes.

== Career ==
In 1949, Barnes founded Edward Larrabee Barnes Associates in Manhattan. During his long career, Barnes, with his wife Mary Barnes as interior designer, designed office buildings, museums, botanical gardens, private houses, churches, schools, camps, colleges, campus master plans, and housing. Although best known for the Haystack Mountain College of Arts and other smaller residential homes, the firm also completed a number of master planning urban development projects.

The firm's planning projects include:

- Crown Center
- State University of NY at Purchase (SUNY)
- Florida Atlantic University School of Arts and Letters
- National University of Singapore Housing
- Southwestern Medical Center, Texas
- Stonecrest, San Diego
- SUNY Potsdam
- Indiana University/Purdue

Over the years, he also taught at Harvard University, the Pratt Institute, and the University of Virginia, and served as a member of the Urban Design Council of New York and as vice-president of the American Academy in Rome. In 1969, Barnes was elected into the National Academy of Design as an Associate member and became a full member in 1974. He was elected a Fellow of the American Academy of Arts and Sciences in 1978. In 2007, he was posthumously honored with the American Institute of Architects' highest award, the AIA Gold Medal. He also received the Thomas Jefferson Medal in Architecture, the Harvard University 350th Anniversary Medal, and some forty other awards. His Haystack Mountain School of Crafts won the AIA Twenty-five Year Award.

In 1993, Barnes announced his retirement but he continued to work as a consultant for Lee / Timchula Architects, founded by Barnes' lead partner, John M.Y. Lee, and associate, Michael Timchula. Lee / Timchula inherited various projects that the Barnes' office was awarded.

The AIA Board of Directors posthumously awarded the 2007 AIA Gold Medal to Edward Larrabee Barnes, FAIA.

Barnes died in 2004 in Cupertino, California. His archives are located at the Frances Loeb Library at Harvard University. He is buried on Mt. Desert Island, Maine.

== Notable partners, associates, collaborators, and mentees ==
Sources:

- Mark Cavagnero
- Alexander Cooper
- Charles Gwathmey
- Toshiko Mori
- Laurie Olin
- Robert Siegel

== Selected projects list ==
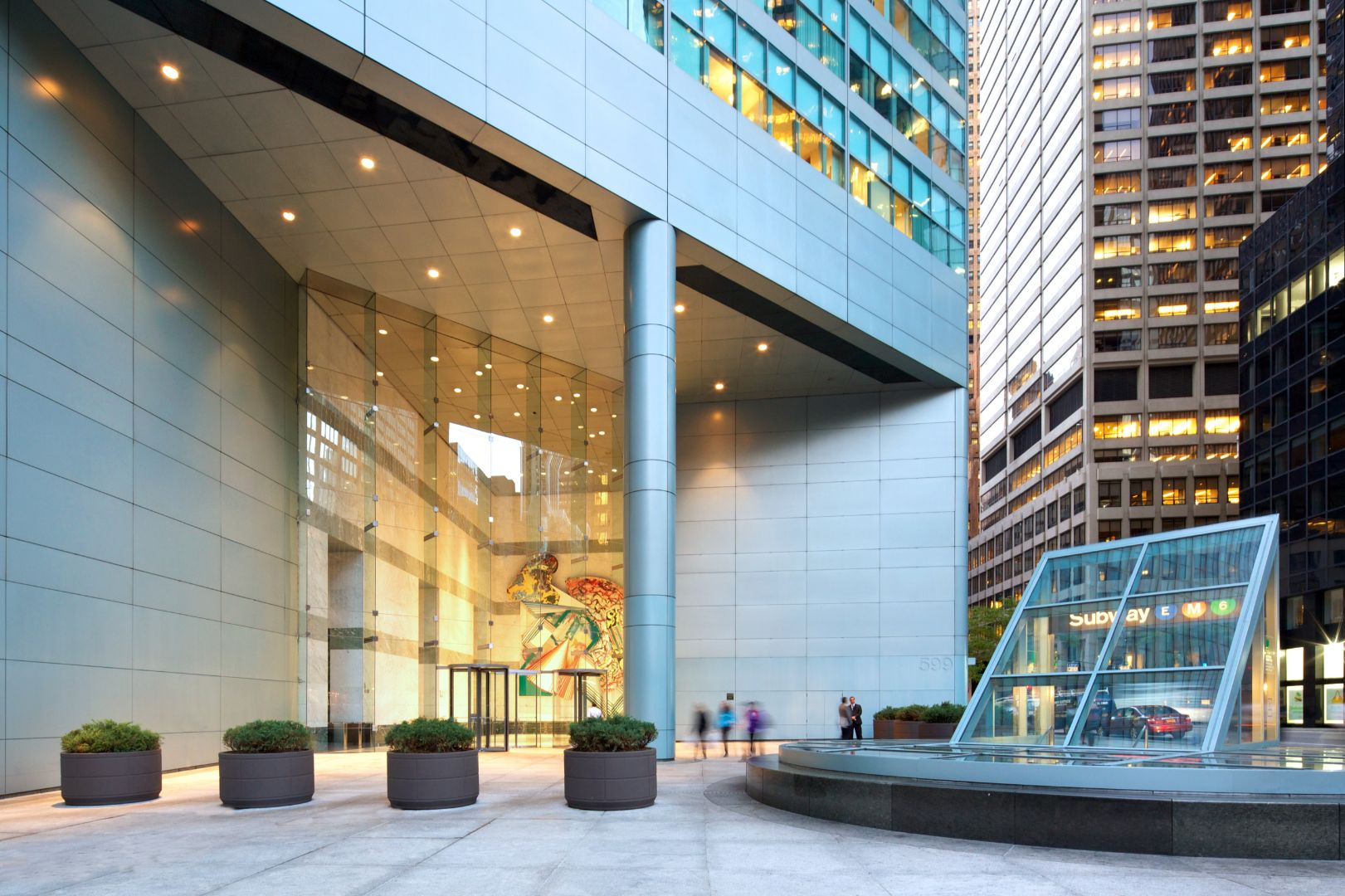
599 Lexington Avenue, New York City (1986)

- Haystack Mountain School of Arts and Crafts Master Plan, Deer Isle, ME, 1962
- Christian Theological Seminary, Indianapolis, IN, 1966
- Bennington College student housing, Bennington, VT 1966
- Crown Center Master Plan, Kansas City, MO 1970s
- 28 State Street, Boston, MA, 1969
- Walker Art Center, Minneapolis, MN, 1971
- Minneapolis Sculpture Garden, Minneapolis MN, 1971
- Smart Museum, Chicago, IL, 1974
- Carnegie Museum of Art, Pittsburgh, PA, 1974
- Cochrane-Woods Art Center, Chicago, IL, 1974
- Visual Arts Center at Bowdoin College, Brunswick, ME, 1975
- Cross Campus Library, Yale University, 1976 (Remodeled in 2007)
- Citigroup Center, New York City (collaboration), 1977
- Cathedral of the Immaculate Conception, Burlington, VT, 1977
- Asia Society building, New York City, 1980
- Hyatt Regency Kansas City, 1981 (lobby redesign)
- Nora Eccles Harrison Museum of Art, Utah State University, Logan, UT, 1982
- 590 Madison Avenue, New York City, 1983
- Dallas Museum of Art, Dallas, TX, 1984
- 121 South Main Street, Providence, Rhode Island, 1984
- Gooch Dillard, University of Virginia, Charlottesville, VA, 1984
- Museum of Art Fort Lauderdale, Fort Lauderdale, FL 1986
- 599 Lexington Avenue, New York City, 1986
- AXA Center, New York City, 1986 (Equitable Building)
- 125 West 55th Street, New York City, 1988
- Hyde Collection, Glens Falls, NY, 1989 (expansion)
- Hammer Museum, Los Angeles, CA, 1990
- Knoxville Museum of Art, Knoxville, TN, 1990
- Thurgood Marshall Federal Judiciary Building, Washington, DC, 1992
- Birmingham Museum of Art, Birmingham, AL, 1993 (expansion)
- IUPUI Campus Master Plan, Indianapolis, IN, 1994
- National University of Singapore, Master Plan 2 1990's

== Gallery ==
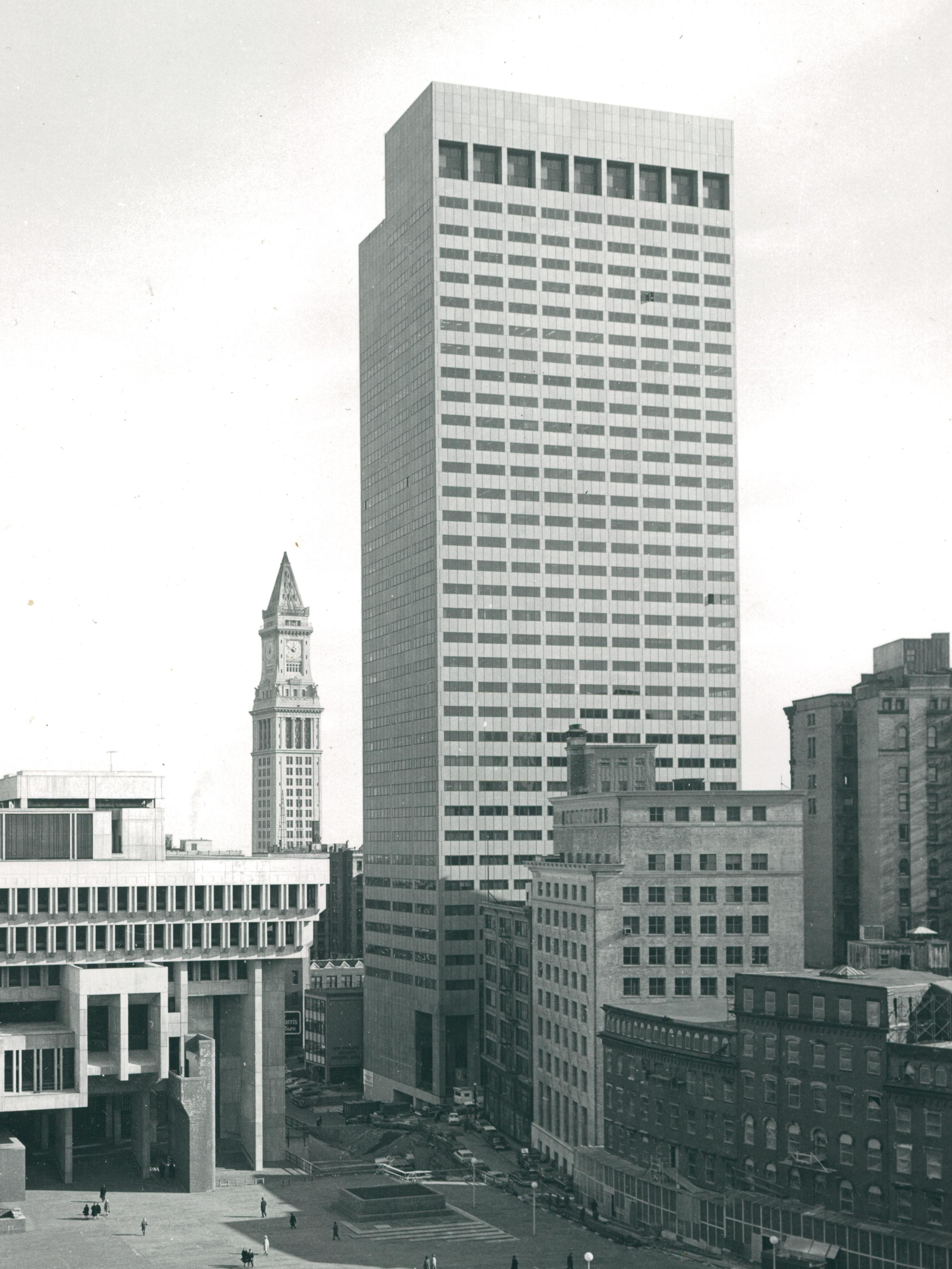
28 State Street, 1969

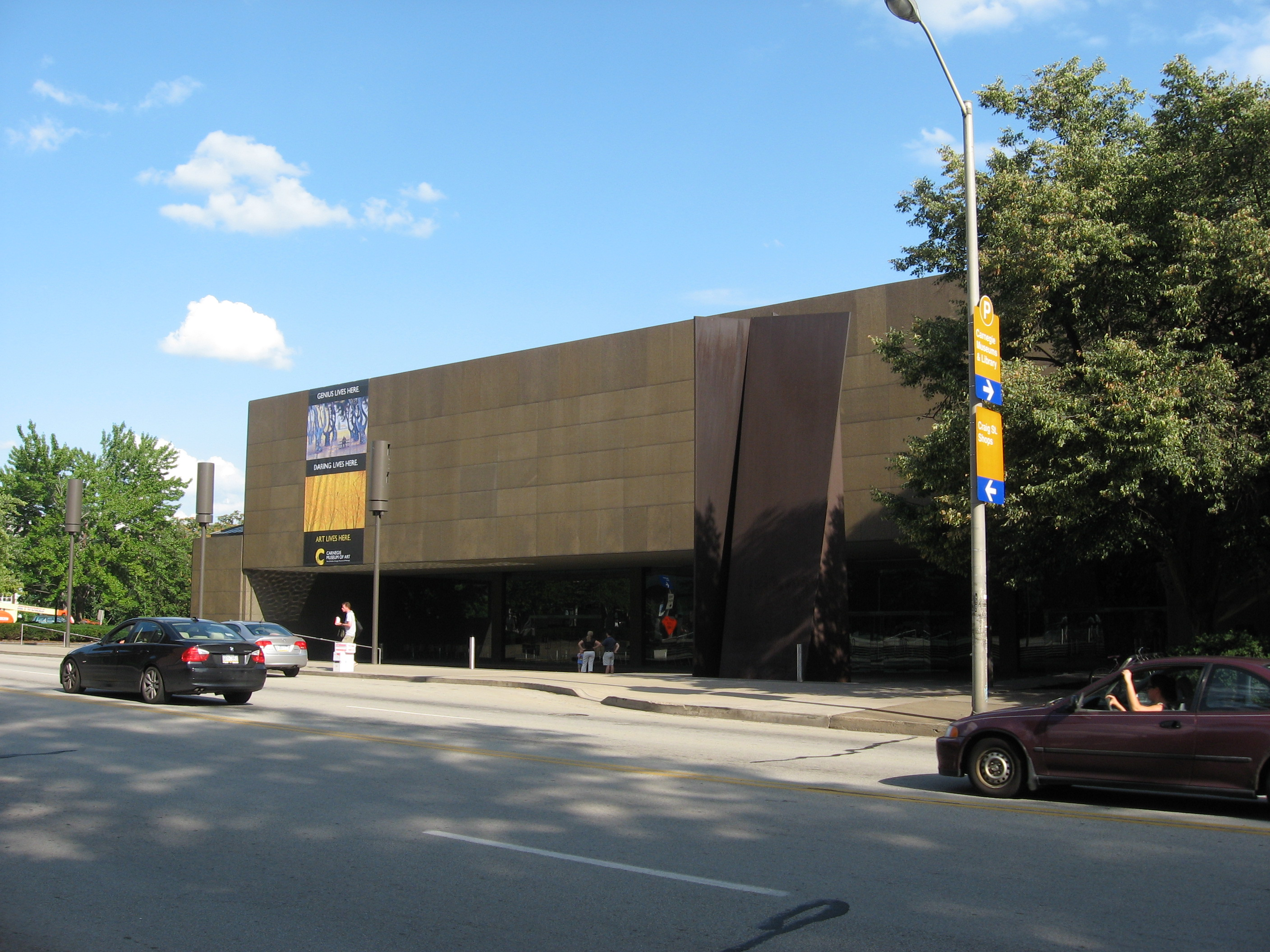
Carnegie Museum of Art, Sarah Scaife Galleries, 1974

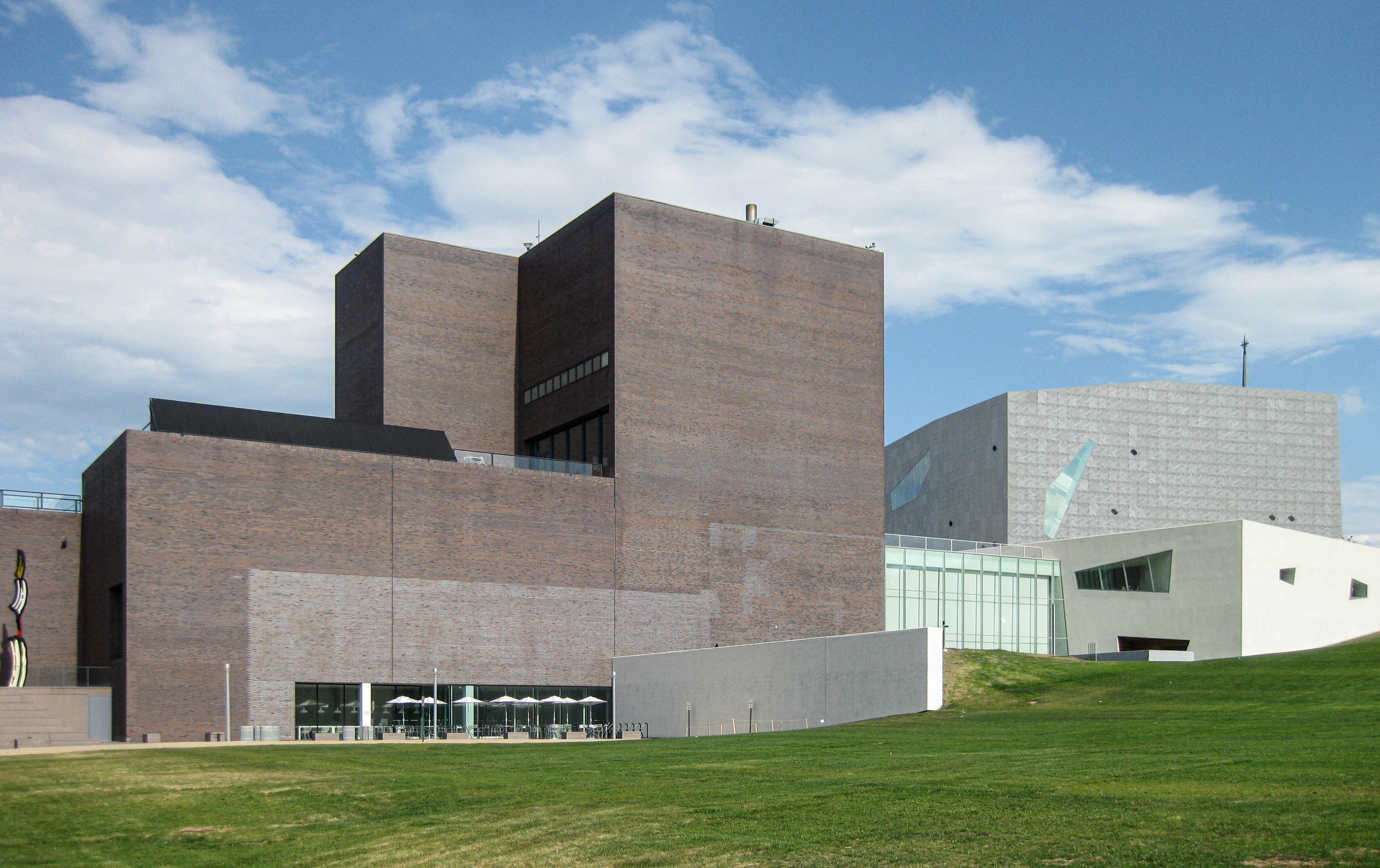
Walker Art Center, 1971

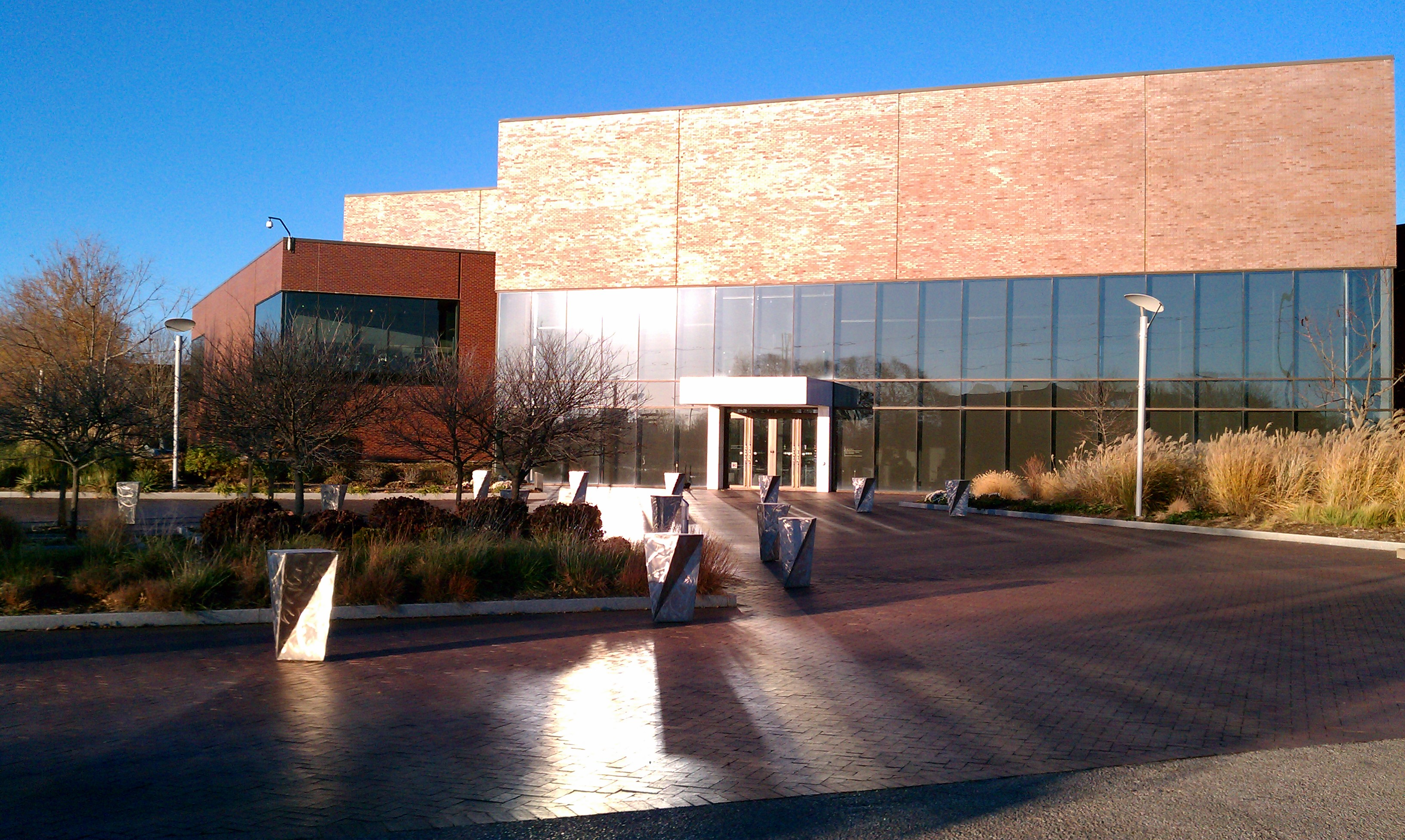
Wichita Art Museum, 1977

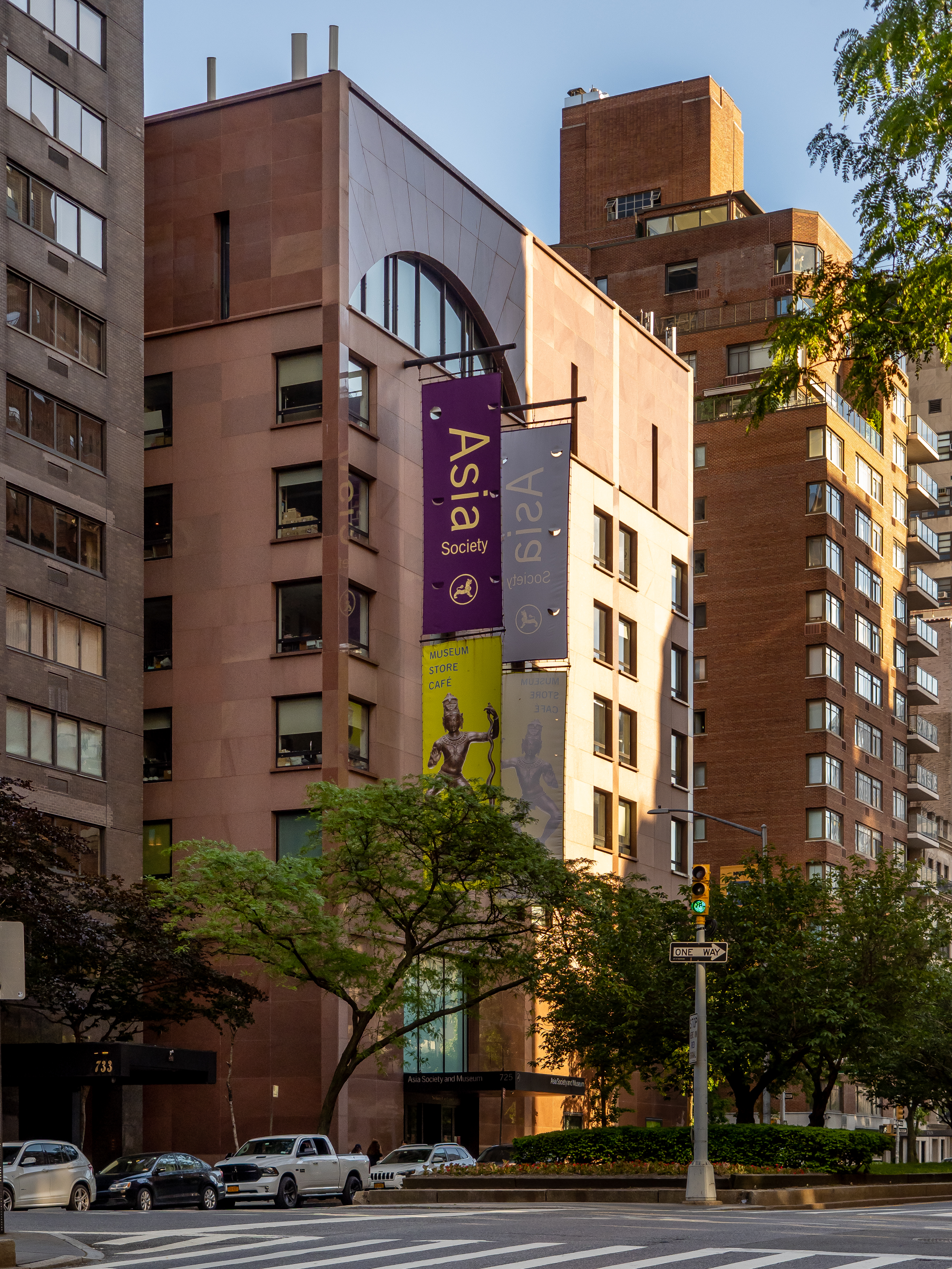
Asia Society, 1980

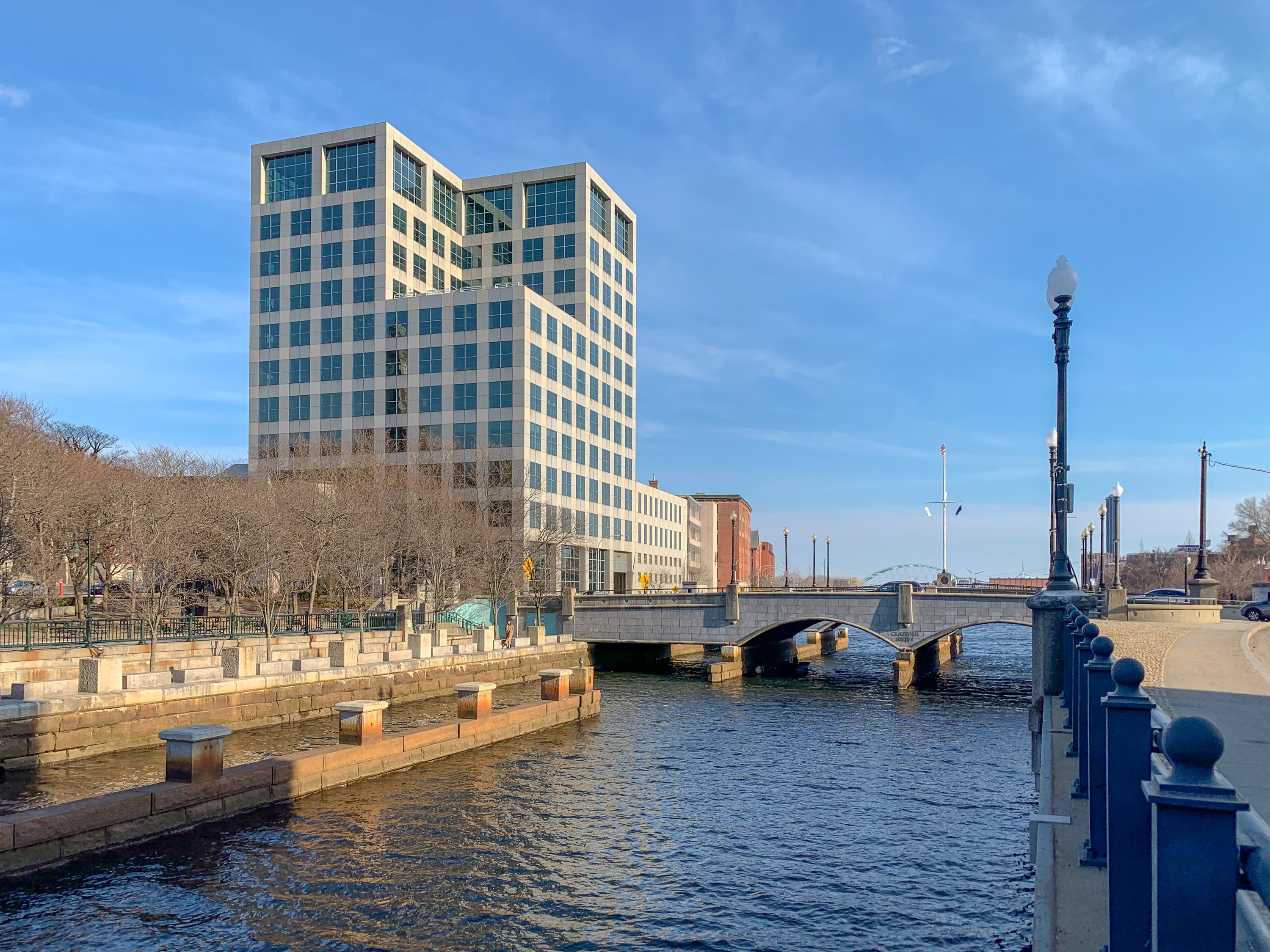
121 South Main Street, 1984

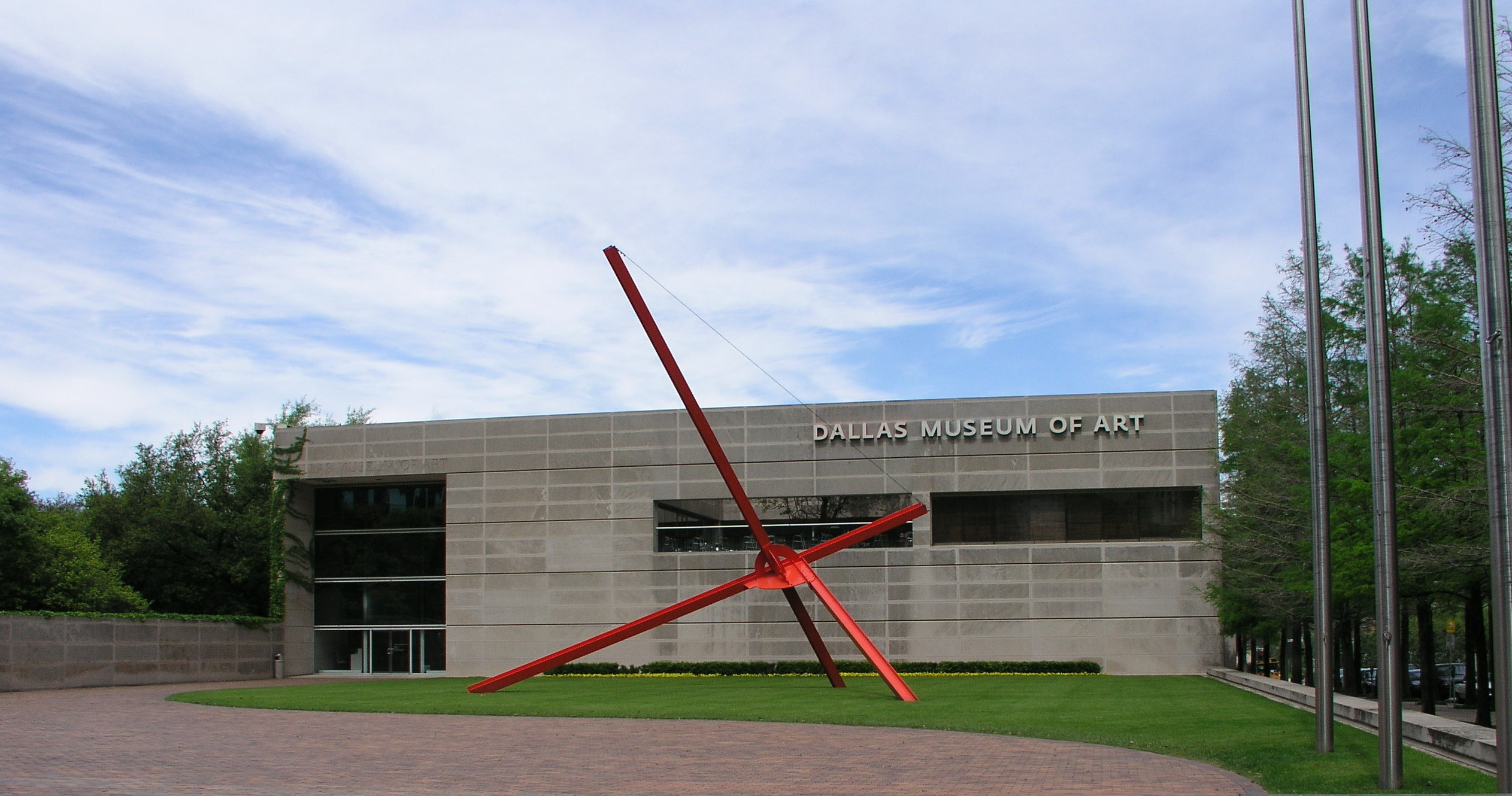
Dallas Museum of Art, 1984

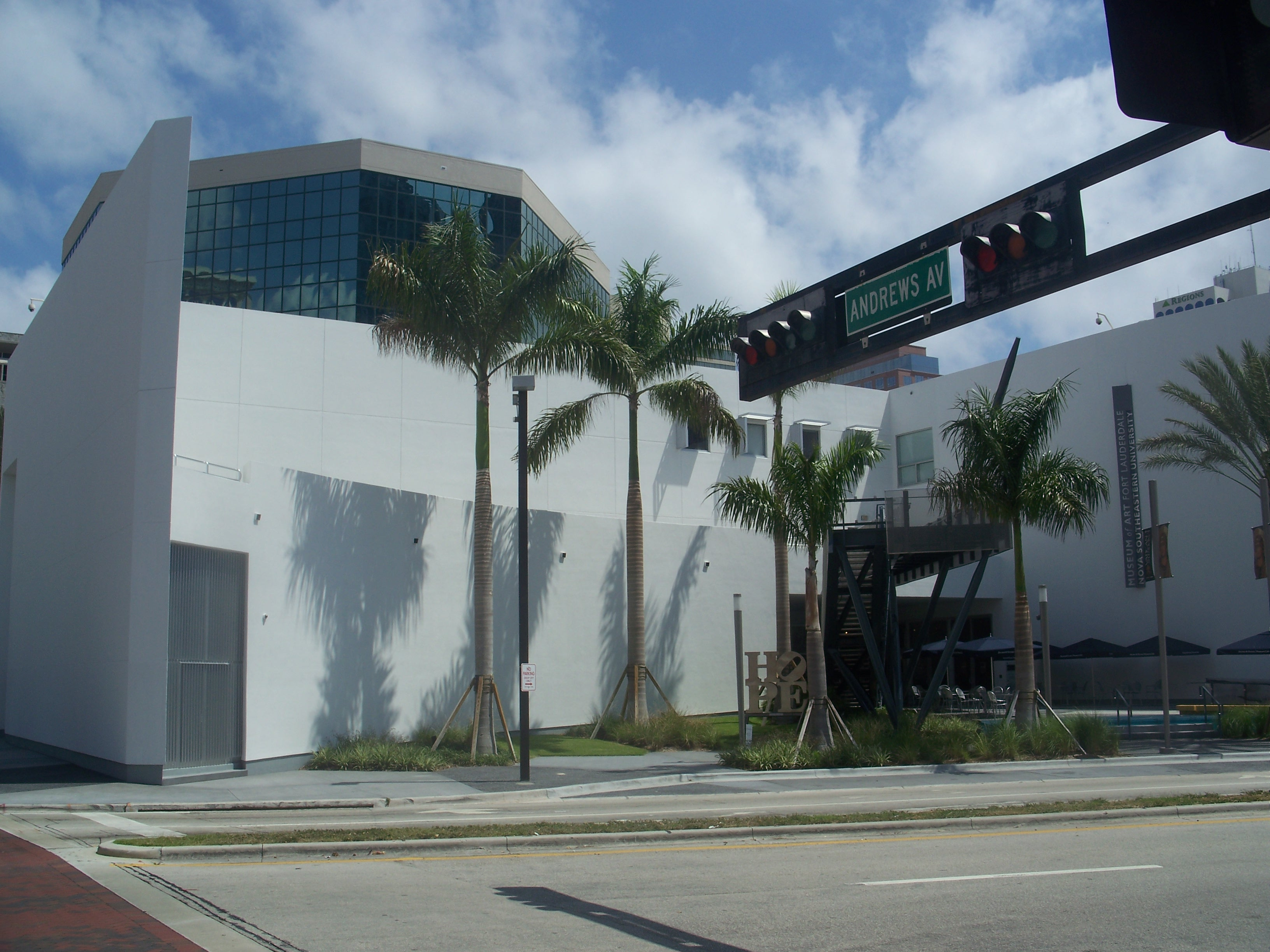
Museum of Art Fort Lauderdale, 1986

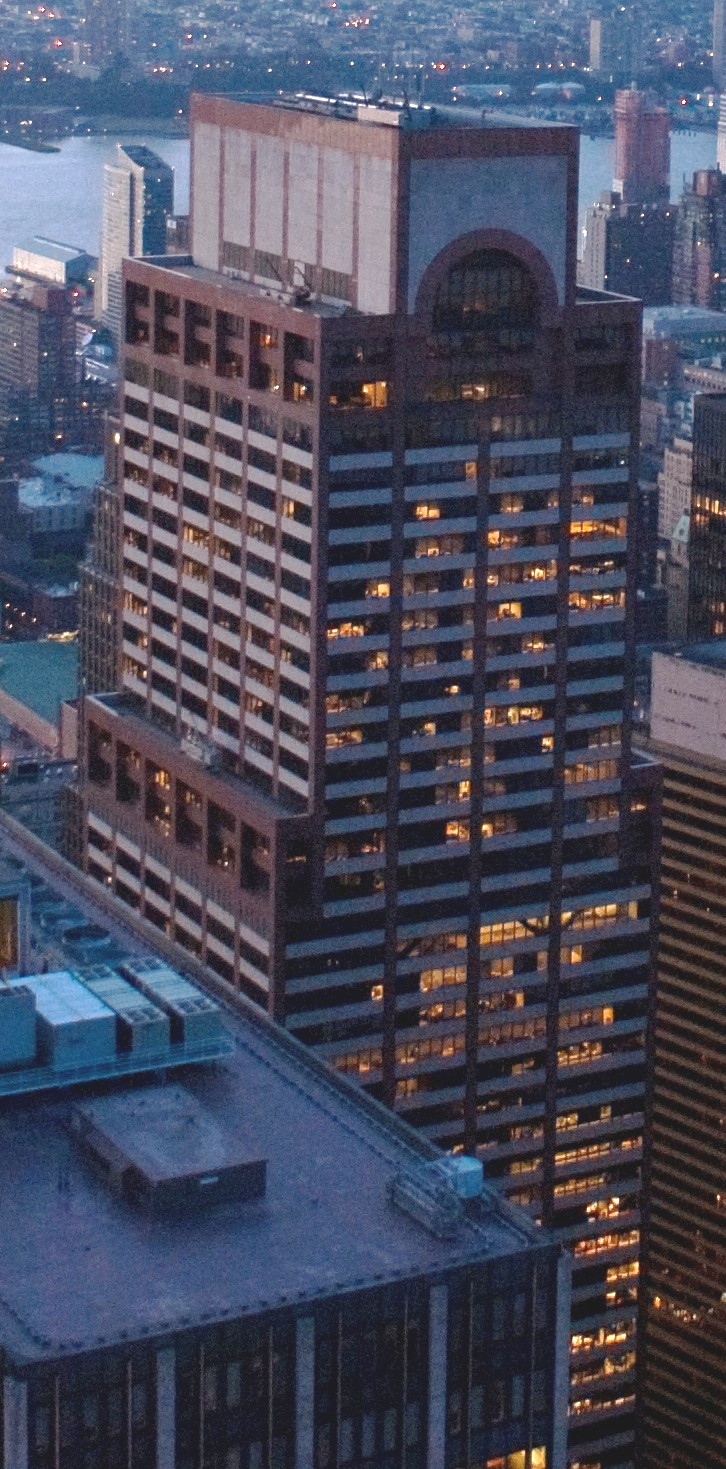
787 Seventh Avenue, 1986

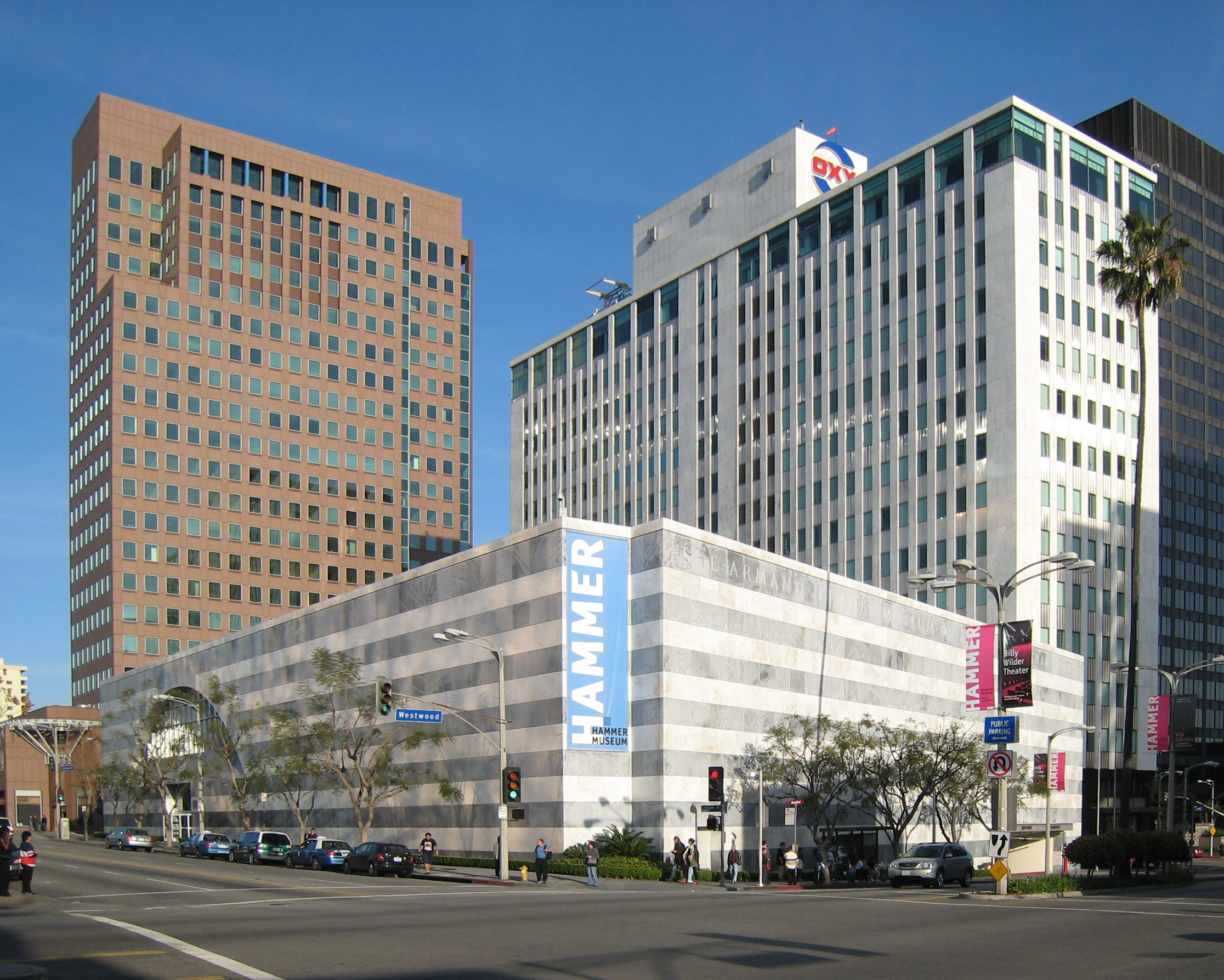
Hammer Museum, 1990

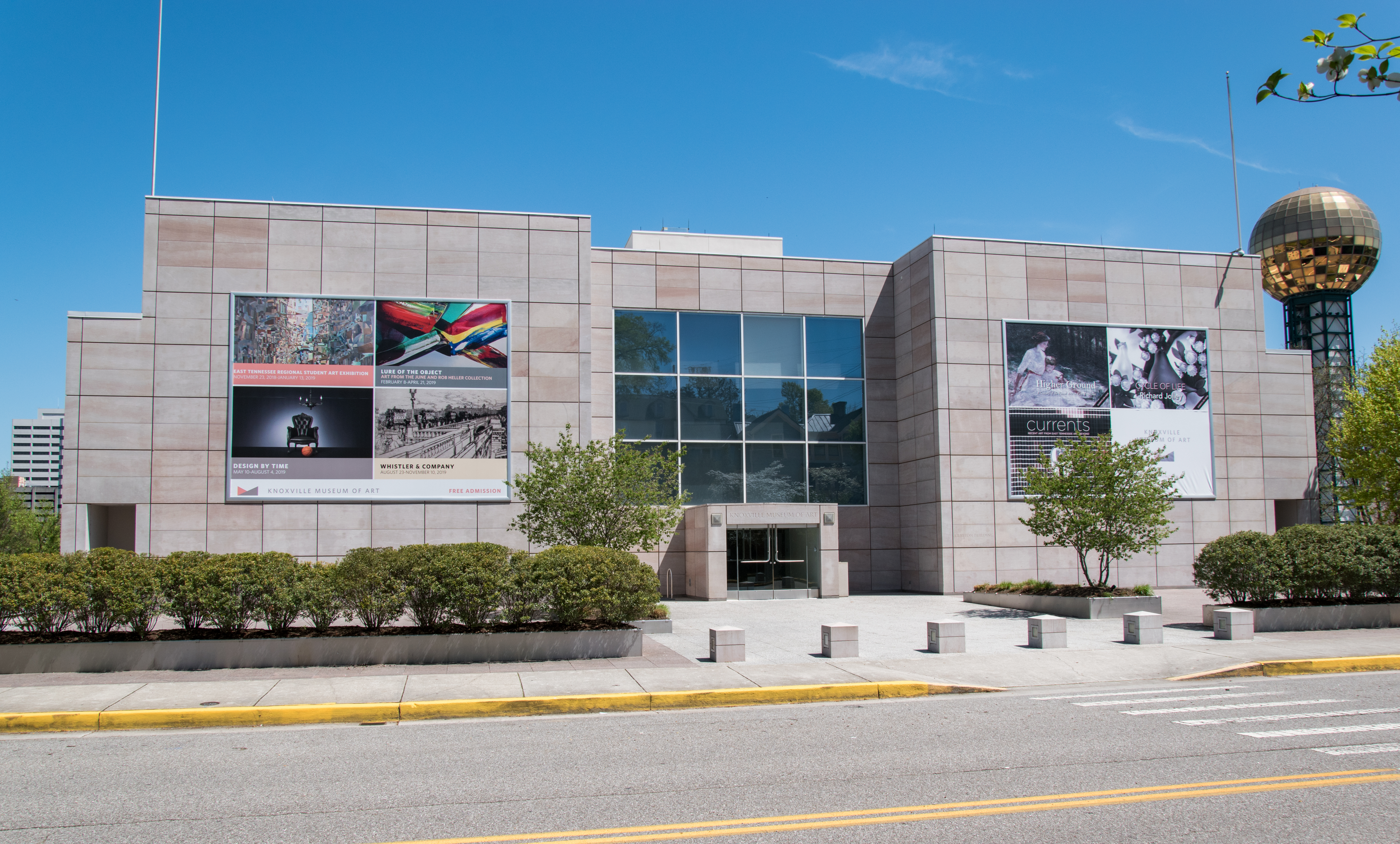
Knoxville Museum of Art, 1990

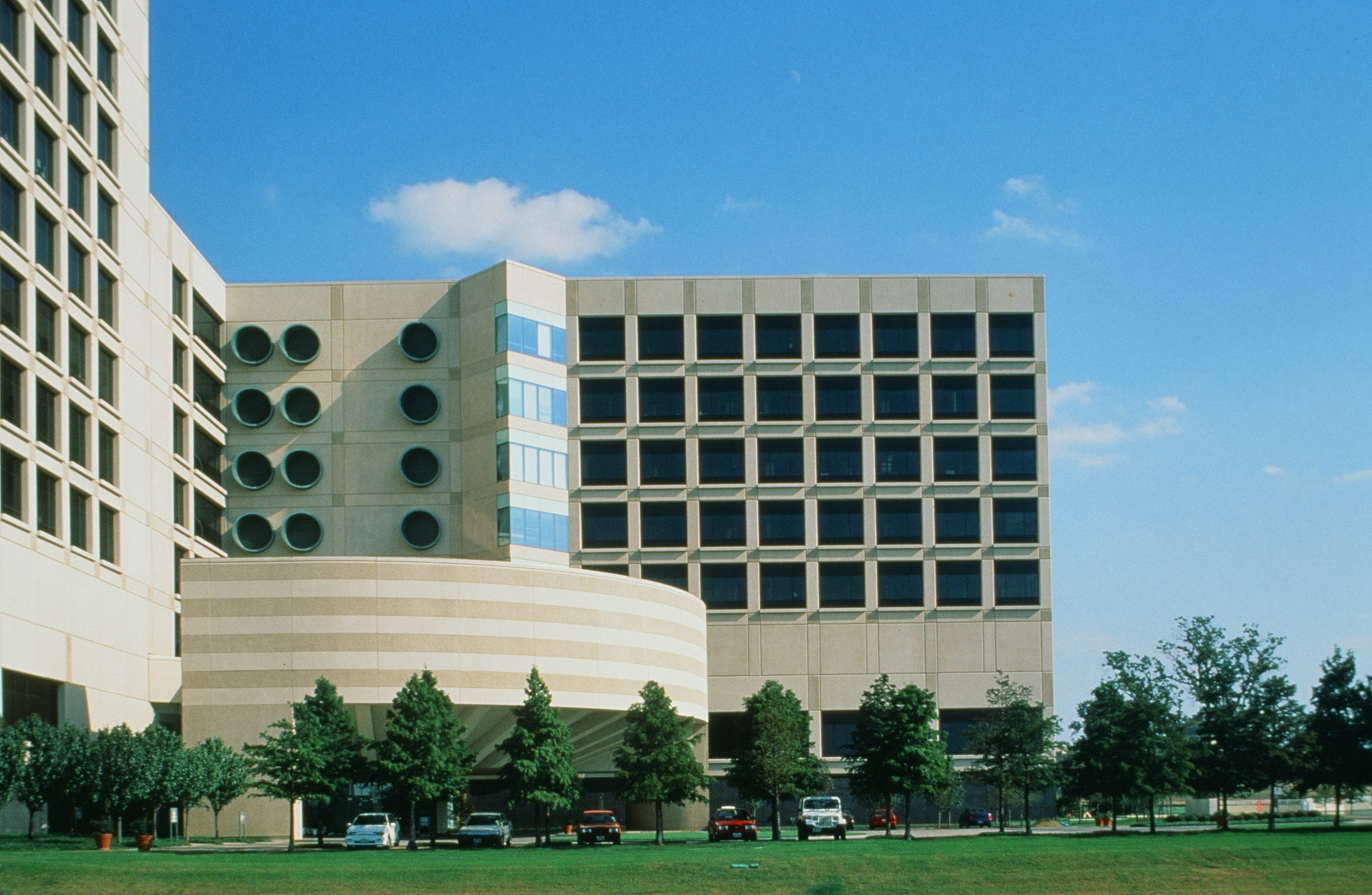
UTSW Medical Center Phases, 1,2 plus overall development plan

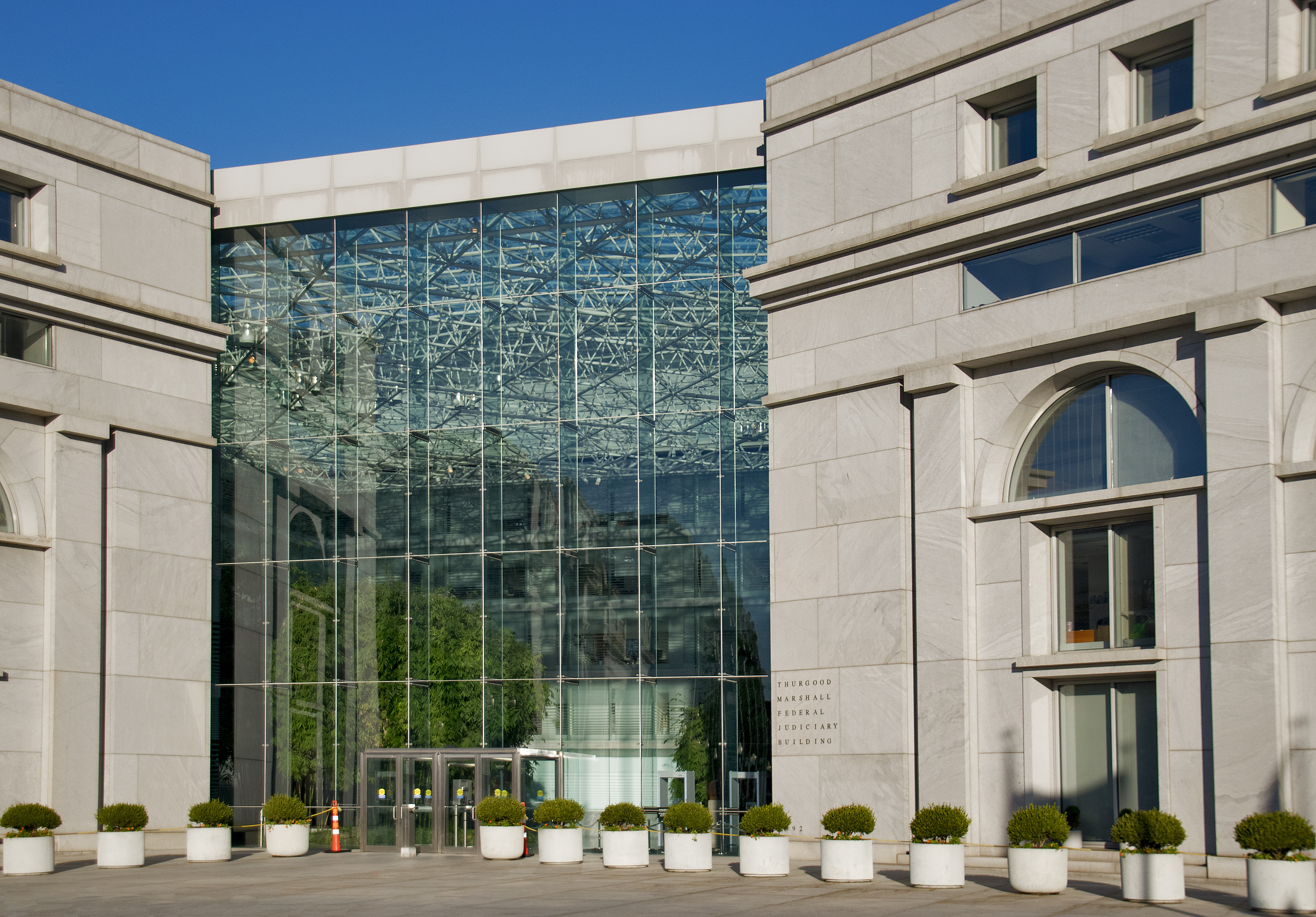
Thurgood Marshall Federal Judiciary Building, 1992

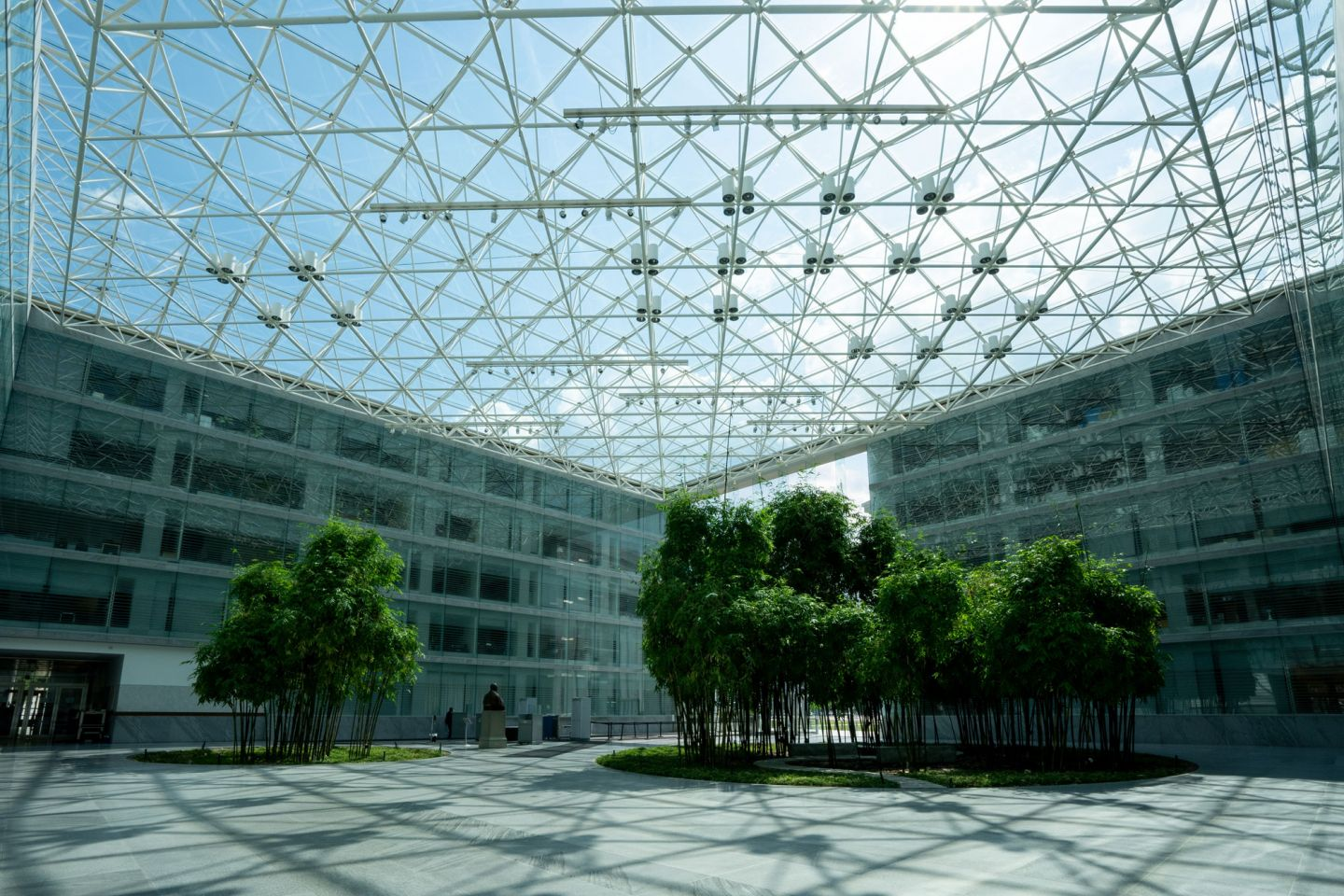
Thurgood Marshall Federal Judiciary Building, 1992

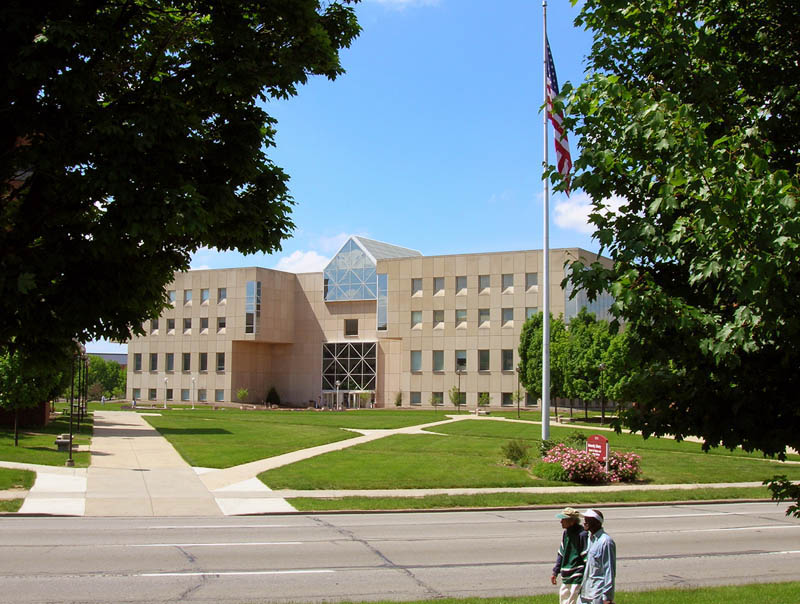
IUPUI University Library, 1994

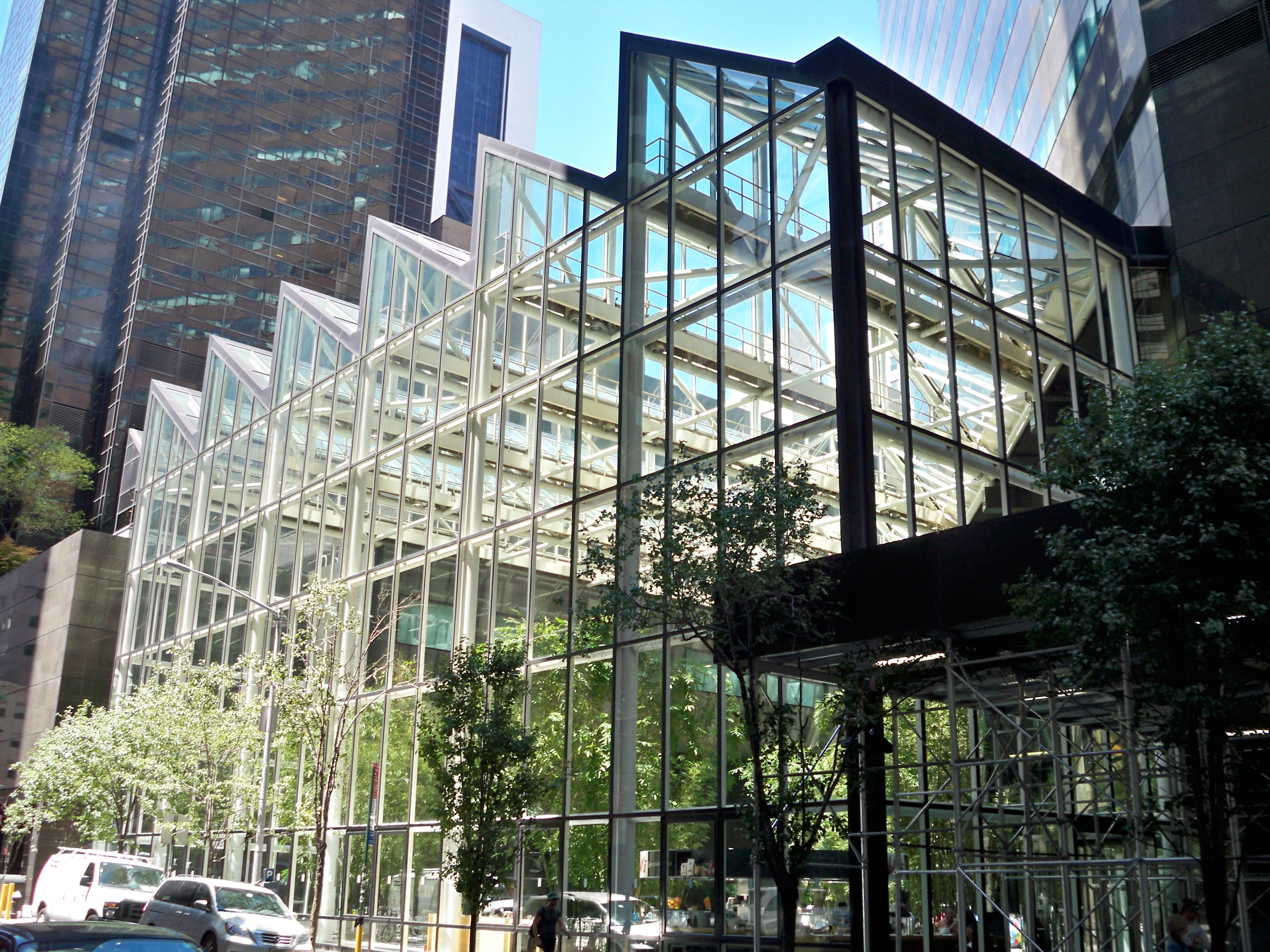
IBM Building Atrium. Barnes was known for robust public space and art galleries

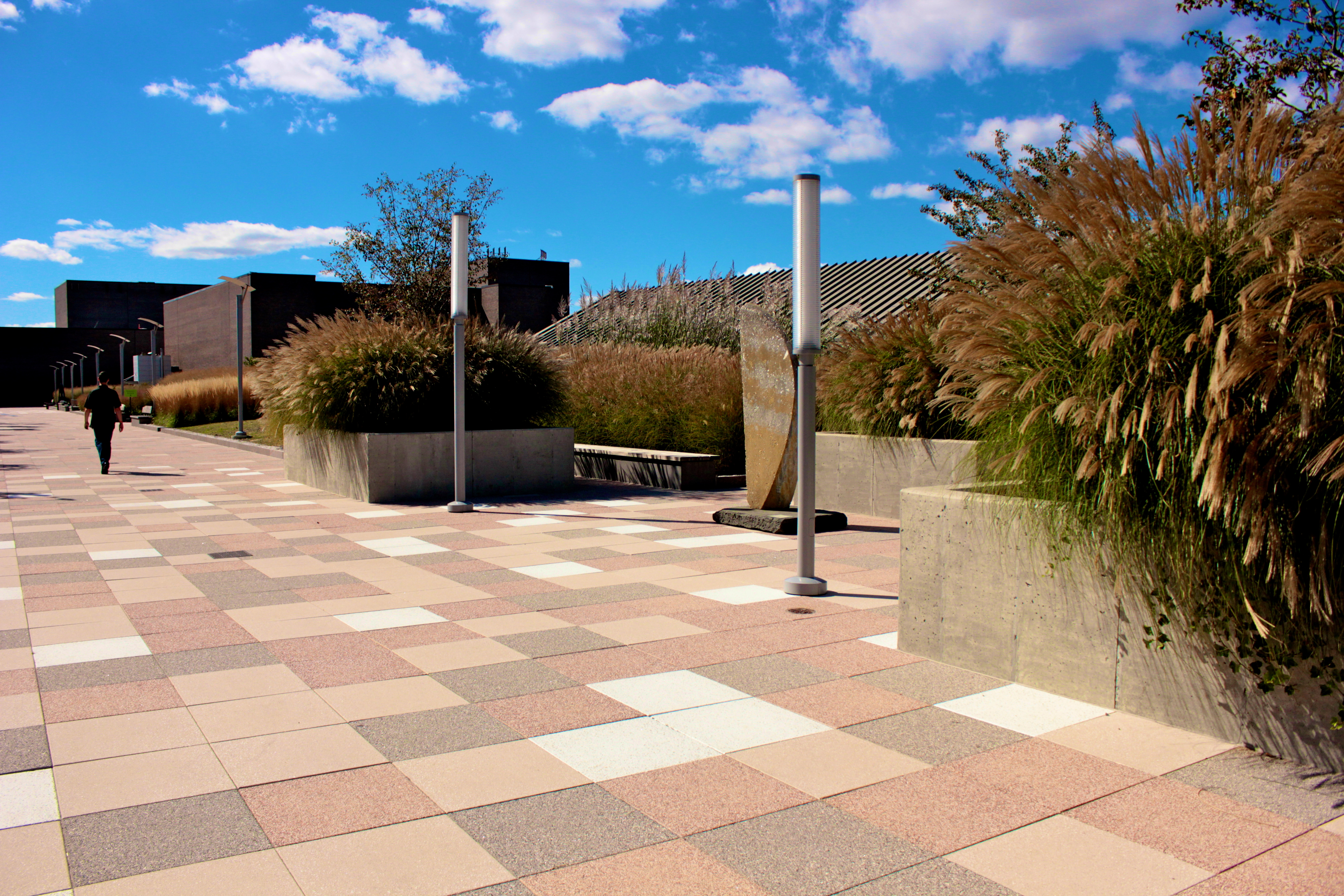
Suny Purchase Campus Masterplan
