= Lexington Avenue/51st Street station =

New York City Subway station in Manhattan

Lexington Avenue/51 Street
- New York City Subway station complex
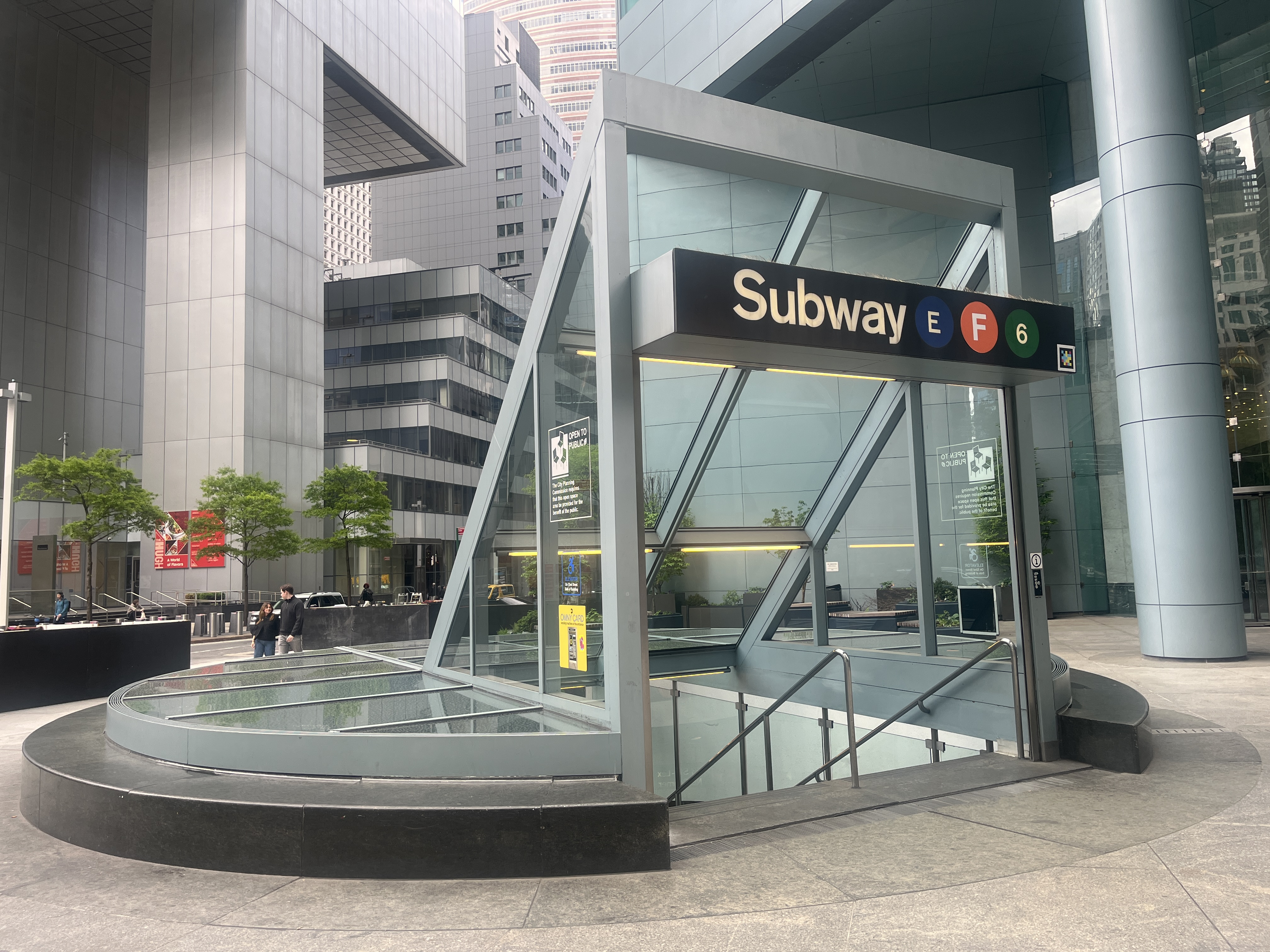
- Lexington Avenue and 53rd Street plaza entrance

Station statistics
- Address: East 53rd Street & Lexington Avenue; New York, New York
- Borough: Manhattan
- Locale: Midtown Manhattan
- Coordinates: 40.757075°N 73.971977°W
- Division: A (IRT), B (IND)
- Line: IRT Lexington Avenue Line; IND Queens Boulevard Line
- Services: 4 (late nights); 6 (all times) <6> (weekdays until 8:45 p.m., peak direction); E (all times); F (weekday) <F> (two rush hour trains, peak direction)
- Transit: NYCT Bus: M50, M101, M102, M103, SIM6, SIM11, SIM22, SIM26; MTA Bus: BxM1
- Structure: Underground
- Levels: 2

Other information
- Opened: June 26, 1989; 37 years ago
- Accessible: Yes

Traffic
- 2025: 13,335,057 ▲7%
- Rank: 13 out of 423
Location
Location within New York City Subway
Location within New York City
Location within New York
Street map
Station service legend
Symbol	Description
Stops all times	Stops all times
Stops late nights only	Stops late nights only
Stops rush hours in the peak direction only	Stops rush hours in the peak direction only
Stops weekdays during the day	Stops weekdays during the day

The Lexington Avenue/51st Street station is a New York City Subway station complex on the IRT Lexington Avenue Line and IND Queens Boulevard Line. The station is located on Lexington Avenue and stretches from 51st Street to 53rd Street in Midtown Manhattan. It is served by the 6 and E trains at all times; the F train on weekdays during the day; the <6> train during weekdays in the peak direction; the <F> train during rush hours in the reverse peak direction; and the 4 train during late nights.

The complex comprises two stations: 51st Street on the Lexington Avenue Line and Lexington Avenue–53rd Street (originally Lexington–Third Avenues) on the Queens Boulevard Line. Originally two separate stations, these were connected in 1988 via a transfer passage, which was opened with the construction of 599 Lexington Avenue. Approximately 50,000 riders transfer between the Lexington Avenue and Queens Boulevard Lines each weekday.

In 2024, the station complex had an annual ridership of 12,536,617, making it the twelfth-busiest in the system.

== History ==
=== IRT Lexington Avenue Line ===
==== Planning and construction ====
Following the completion of the original subway line operated by the Interborough Rapid Transit Company (IRT), there were plans to construct the Broadway–Lexington Avenue Line along Manhattan's east side. The New York Public Service Commission adopted plans for what was known as the Broadway–Lexington Avenue route on December 31, 1907. The Brooklyn Rapid Transit Company (BRT; after 1923, the Brooklyn–Manhattan Transit Corporation or BMT) submitted a proposal to the Commission, dated March 2, 1911, to operate this line as part of the tri-borough system. Originally, the commission had assigned the operation of the Lexington Avenue Line in Manhattan to the BRT, as the IRT had withdrawn from negotiations over the proposed tri-borough system. The IRT proposed in December 1911 that it be assigned the Lexington Avenue Line, in exchange for dropping its opposition to the BRT's operation of the Broadway Line. The Lexington Avenue Line was to connect with the IRT's existing subway north of Grand Central–42nd Street. The IRT submitted an offer for what became its portion of the Dual Contracts on February 27, 1912.

The Dual Contracts, two operating contracts between the city and the BMT and IRT, were adopted on March 4, 1913, and signed on March 19. The IRT was authorized to construct a local station on its Lexington Avenue Line at 51st Street. The Public Service Commission planned to split the original Interborough Rapid Transit Company (IRT) system from looking like a "Z" system (as seen on a map) to an H-shaped system. The original system would be split into three segments: two north–south lines, carrying through trains over the Lexington Avenue and Broadway–Seventh Avenue Lines, and a west–east shuttle under 42nd Street. This would form a roughly H-shaped system. It was predicted that the subway extension would lead to the growth of the Upper East Side and the Bronx. The IRT was authorized to construct a local station on its Lexington Avenue Line at Lexington Avenue and 51st Street. Contracts for the section of the line south of 53rd Street had still not been awarded by early 1914 because of the changes to the original plans.

In May 1914, the Public Service Commission began soliciting bids for the construction of section 7 of the Lexington Avenue Line, which stretched between 43rd and 53rd Streets and included a station at 51st Street. IRT subsidiary Rapid Transit Subway Construction Company received a $1,915,164 contract to build section 7 the next month. The Public Service Commission received the rights in July 1915 to build subway entrances within the Nursery and Child's Hospital at the southeastern corner of Lexington Avenue and 51st Street, which would have served the IRT station there. Although the Lexington Avenue Line north of 53rd Street was almost completed by the end of 1915, that segment could not be opened because the rest of the line was not complete. In particular, the section between 43rd and 53rd Streets was only 37 percent done. Work on section 7 of the line was delayed in mid-1916 when numerous workers went on strike. Section 7 was 42 percent complete by September 1916 and was 77 percent finished by the following March.

==== Opening and early years ====
The 51st Street station opened on July 17, 1918, with service initially running between Grand Central–42nd Street and 167th Street via the line's local tracks. On August 1, the "H system" was put into place, with through service beginning on the new east and west side trunk lines, and the institution of the 42nd Street Shuttle along the old connection between the sides. The cost of the extension from Grand Central was $58 million. As part of an experiment, the IRT installed four "feather-weight-pressure" turnstiles at the station in 1921 to speed up passenger flow. The city government took over the IRT's operations on June 12, 1940.

=== IND Queens Boulevard Line ===
The Queens Boulevard Line was one of the first built by the city-owned Independent Subway System (IND), and was planned to stretch between the IND Eighth Avenue Line in Manhattan and 178th Street and Hillside Avenue in Jamaica, Queens, with a stop at Lexington Avenue. The line was first proposed in 1925. Bids for the 53rd Street subway tunnel were received in October 1926, and work started in April 1927. The 53rd Street Tunnel was fully excavated between Queens and Manhattan in January 1929. The First Avenue Association suggested that an entrance to the Lexington Avenue/53rd Street station on the Queens Boulevard Line be built on Second Avenue, but the New York City Board of Transportation declined to do so, citing high costs and underground obstructions.

The Lexington Avenue/53rd Street station opened on August 19, 1933, with the opening of the IND Queens Boulevard Line to Roosevelt Avenue in Queens. Service was initially provided by E trains running via the IND Eighth Avenue Line. The opening of the 53rd Street Line caused a steep increase in business activity along the corridor. By January 1934, the Lexington Avenue station was the busiest on the Queens Boulevard Line, surpassing the Roosevelt Avenue station. On December 15, 1940, the IND Sixth Avenue Line opened between West Fourth Street–Washington Square and 59th Street–Columbus Circle. On this date, F trains began using this station, diverging west of the station onto the Sixth Avenue Line.

=== Modifications and station renovations ===
==== 1960s and 1970s ====
In 1966, an agreement was reached with the developers of 345 Park Avenue to remove the entrance at the corner of 51st Street and Lexington Avenue and replace it with a new entrance at the same corner adjacent to the building. A group of private citizens, the Fund for Better Subway Stations, announced in September 1968 that it would donate $450,000 to beautify the station. The Metropolitan Transportation Authority (MTA) intended to provide matching funds for the project, but it had not approved a contract for the renovation by early 1970.

In July 1968, MTA subsidiary New York City Transit Authority (NYCTA) completed plans to construct a 320-foot (98 m)-long free transfer passageway between the north end of the 51st Street station and the Lexington Avenue mezzanine of the Lexington Avenue station. Construction on the project was supposed to start in early 1969. On December 12, 1969, the NYCTA put the estimated $2.5 million contract up for bid. The passageway was not built at the time; passengers still had to exit to the street and pay an extra fare to transfer between the stations. This caused overcrowding on the Flushing Line, which did have direct interchanges with the Lexington Avenue and Queens Boulevard lines. By 1970, the IND's Lexington Avenue station was among the subway system's 12 worst bottlenecks for passenger flow. The escalators at the western end of the IND station were replaced in 1977, and a new subway entrance was built as part of the construction of Citicorp Center in the late 1970s.

==== 1980s ====
Renovations of the IRT's 51st Street station and the IND's Lexington Avenue station were funded as part of the MTA's 1980–1984 capital plan. Madison Equities, the developer of an office building at 875 Third Avenue, agreed in 1981 to expand the IND station and add a retail arcade in exchange for 90,000 square feet (8,400 m^{2}) of additional space. The developer was unable to complete the subway expansion because of the presence of holdout tenants in four brownstones, which occupied the site of the proposed subway entrance. The New York City Planning Commission mandated that two floors of 875 Third Avenue could not be occupied unless the subway improvements were completed, or unless Madison Equities had attempted to buy out the holdout tenants. Following various legal disputes, Madison Equities finally bought out the holdout tenants in the late 1980s and completed the subway expansion.

Boston Properties, which was developing a skyscraper at 599 Lexington Avenue between 52nd and 53rd Streets, proposed in 1984 to construct a passageway between 52nd Street and the IND mezzanine at 53rd Street. The MTA would concurrently build the section of the passageway between 51st and 52nd Streets. The 36-foot-wide passageway would be bisected by a glass wall, which would allow passengers to transfer between the stations within fare control while also allowing the public to use it without paying a fare. In exchange, Boston Properties would be permitted to add 146,293 square feet (13,591.1 m^{2}) to its building, expanding the structure's floor area by 20 percent. Manhattan Community Board 6 endorsed the plans in January 1984, and New York City Board of Estimate approved the proposal that April. Vollmer Associates was hired to design the free transfer passageway. Gerald D. Hines, the developer of the Lipstick Building at 885 Third Avenue, was similarly allowed to expand his building's floor area by 20 percent in late 1984 after he agreed to add an entrance to the IND station from just outside his building.

Construction of the transfer passageway had begun by early 1986 and lasted three and a half years. During the passage's construction, in June 1986, an old water main broke and flooded the station. To speed up passenger flow, dozens of platform conductors were assigned to direct crowds on the IND platform during the late 1980s. Additionally, the MTA began installing elevators at the 51st Street IRT station in 1986, making it one of the first wheelchair-accessible stations in the subway system. By December 1988, Boston Properties had completed its half of the transfer passageway and opened a new subway entrance. However, the MTA's portion of the passageway was delayed by the presence of utilities, as well as the fact that workers had encountered solid rock rather than soft ground. The passageway between the IRT and IND platforms opened on June 26, 1989, two years behind schedule. Boston Properties had contributed $13 million on the project, while the MTA spent $10 million. The passageway was expected to be used by 20,000 daily passengers at the time of its completion. A reporter for Newsday wrote: "Were it not for the concept of developer shakedown, those two lines would still not meet."

==== 1990s to present ====
In April 1993, the New York State Legislature agreed to give the MTA $9.6 billion for capital improvements. Some of the funds would be used to renovate nearly one hundred New York City Subway stations, including the IND station at Lexington Avenue. Amid a funding shortfall, the MTA announced in October 1994 that it had indefinitely postponed plans for renovating the Lexington Avenue/51st Street station. The transfer between the IRT and IND platforms was temporarily closed on May 16, 1996, while the escalators were being replaced; riders were forced to exit the station, walk along street level, and pay another fare to reenter the station. In addition, reverse-peak E and F trains did not stop at the station (northbound during the morning, southbound during the afternoon) to reduce overcrowding, as only the escalators to Third Avenue remained open. During that time, the Gottlieb Group replaced four escalators in the complex for $10.5 million. The work was supposed to be completed in September 1996, but it was pushed back by four months due to the need for asbestos abatement and the large crowds at the station.

Local civic groups reported in the mid-1990s that the station suffered from severe overcrowding. The complex was ranked as the system's sixth-busiest station in 1999, with 16.6 million annual passengers, beating out express stations on the Lexington Avenue Line such as 14th Street–Union Square and 86th Street. According to surveys conducted in the early 2000s by advocacy group Straphangers Campaign, the Lexington Avenue/51st Street station had the worst "cleanliness, security, ease of movement and station information" of any major subway station citywide. The station's escalators were among the system's most heavily used. In early 2001, to reduce overcrowding, the MTA placed orange decals on the Lexington Avenue Line platforms with the words "Step Aside", and it employed platform attendants during rush hours. The V train replaced the F train at the station in December 2001, when the 63rd Street Connection opened. To compensate for the loss of a free transfer between the F and 6 trains, the MTA added a free out-of-system transfer between the Lexington Avenue–63rd Street station and the Lexington Avenue/59th Street station.

By the early 2000s, the MTA was planning to spend $74.7 million on further renovations, including a new passageway. Work commenced in November 2002. During that time, northbound E and V trains skipped the station during morning rush hours, and passengers were not allowed to transfer from the 6 train to the E and V trains. As part of efforts to ease crowding in the station, a mezzanine was added to connect the Lexington Avenue passageway to the Third Avenue end of the IND station. The escalators to the IND platform were also replaced, and a new elevator was added to the IND platform. During this renovation, the transfer passageway was temporarily narrowed to as little as 6.5 feet (2.0 m) at certain points; this created hazardous conditions during rush hours. The escalators reopened in October 2003, ahead of schedule.

By early 2020, the escalators at the Third Avenue end of the station were operating less than five percent of the time and had not worked at all for over a year. This made the escalators the least reliable privately operated escalators in the system. As a result, the Third Avenue escalators were closed for several months of repairs in October 2022 and had reopened by December 2023. In 2024, Skanska was hired to replace 21 escalators across the New York City Subway system for $146 million, including one escalator at the 51st Street station. On December 8, 2025, the F and <F> express trains began serving the station on weekdays during the day, running via the 53rd Street Tunnel. The M train began running via the 63rd Street Tunnel during weekdays when it runs to Queens.

== Station layout ==
The IRT Lexington Avenue Line station is a local stop with two tracks and two side platforms. It runs north–south under Lexington Avenue from 50th to 52nd Street. The IND Queens Boulevard Line station is an express stop with two tracks and one island platform. It runs west–east under 53rd Street with a mezzanine from Lexington Avenue to Third Avenue. The mezzanine is divided into two sections by three separate fare control areas.

A passageway links the northbound IRT platform and the mezzanine of the IND platform. From the extreme north end of both IRT platforms, a staircase, an elevator, and an escalator lead to an underpass connecting the southbound and northbound IRT platforms, linking to a corridor extending north from the northbound platform. The corridor extends north to the staircases and escalators going down to the IND platform, with a turnstile bank in the center. The corridor is divided into two sections: a shopping arcade outside fare control and a transfer hallway inside fare control. At the north end of the corridor are two escalators (one up-only, the other reversible-direction) and a staircase down to the west end of the IND platform. A down-only escalator, a reversible-direction escalator, and an elevator are located to the east, leading to the center of the IND platform.

=== Artwork ===
In 1976, with funding from the Exxon Corporation, this station, as well as three others citywide, received new "artfully humorous graffiti" murals and artwork. Local designer Sperling Elman Inc. received $5,000 to place a new coat of paint on the entrances. The paint was placed "in a variety of colors and in broad stripes".

As part of the MTA Arts & Design program, an artwork by Nina Yankowitz, Tunnel Vision, was installed in the underpass connecting the IRT platforms in 1988 or 1989. The artwork consisted of blue tiles within a crack arranged in the shape of a lightning bolt, which was placed against a white-tile wall. According to Yankowitz, the crack was meant to "symbolically open the tunnel to expose the sky". The artwork also included a frieze atop the wall, which was patterned after the skyline of New York City, as well as decorative pilasters. This artwork covered 1,000 ft^{2} (93 m^{2}) and was removed in 2016.

Abstract painter Al Held designed an artwork in 2004, Passing Through, just prior to his death. It consists of multicolored mosaic tiles along the curving mezzanine walls. The tiles, manufactured by Miotto Mosaic Art Studio, depict various geometric shapes that appear to "float" along the wall, such as rings, checkerboard patterns, clouds, and pipes. The artwork measures about 115 feet (35 m) long.

=== Exits ===
The section of the transfer corridor outside fare control leads to a staircase and elevator inside the south side of 132 East 53rd Street, which go up to the northeast corner of East 52nd Street and Lexington Avenue. A glass-enclosed staircase outside the same building leads to the southeast corner of 53rd Street and Lexington Avenue. Outside fare control under the Citigroup Center, at the northeast corner of the same intersection, there are two stairs and an elevator.

The southbound Lexington Avenue Line platform has a part-time fare control area near the south end. A seven-step staircase goes up to a turnstile bank. Outside fare control, there is a customer assistance booth and one staircase going up to a plaza at 560 Lexington Avenue on the northwest corner of Lexington Avenue and East 50th Street. This entrance is placed within a curved glass enclosure measuring 10 to 11 feet (3.0 to 3.4 m) high; during weekends, the entrance is sealed off by a circular hinged wall. The entrance's current design was part of a renovation of the plaza designed by Skidmore, Owings & Merrill and completed in 2015. The New York Public Library's Terence Cardinal Cooke-Cathedral Branch is within this exit, just outside of fare control. The 2,100-square-foot (200 m^{2}) branch, the second smallest in the NYPL system, became part of the New York Public Library in 1992. Before that, it was a library for the Roman Catholic Archdiocese of New York.

At Lexington Avenue and 51st Street, eight stairs go up to all four corners of that intersection (two to each corner). The eastern stairs serve the northbound platform, and the western stairs serve the southbound platform. At one point, there was also an entrance from the southbound platform to the basement of the General Electric Building at 51st Street, which opened in 1931 and was sealed, being replaced by a new street entrance in 1965. The connecting passageway was made of marble with aluminum storefronts. The entrance in the General Electric Building's basement replaced the original sidewalk staircases at the southwestern corner of Lexington Avenue and 51st Street.

The Queens Boulevard Line platform has an unstaffed entrance/exit at the east (railroad north) end. Two staircases go up to either western corner of Third Avenue and 53rd Street. A larger staircase goes up to the entrance plaza of 205 East 53rd Street at the northeast corner, and there is also an entrance/exit from under the southeast-corner building. The original name, Lexington–3rd Avenues, came from this exit. The fare control area contains access to both the primary mezzanine, which contains the IRT transfer, as well as a set of staircases and escalators leading directly to the east end of the IND platform.

== IRT Lexington Avenue Line platforms ==
51 Street
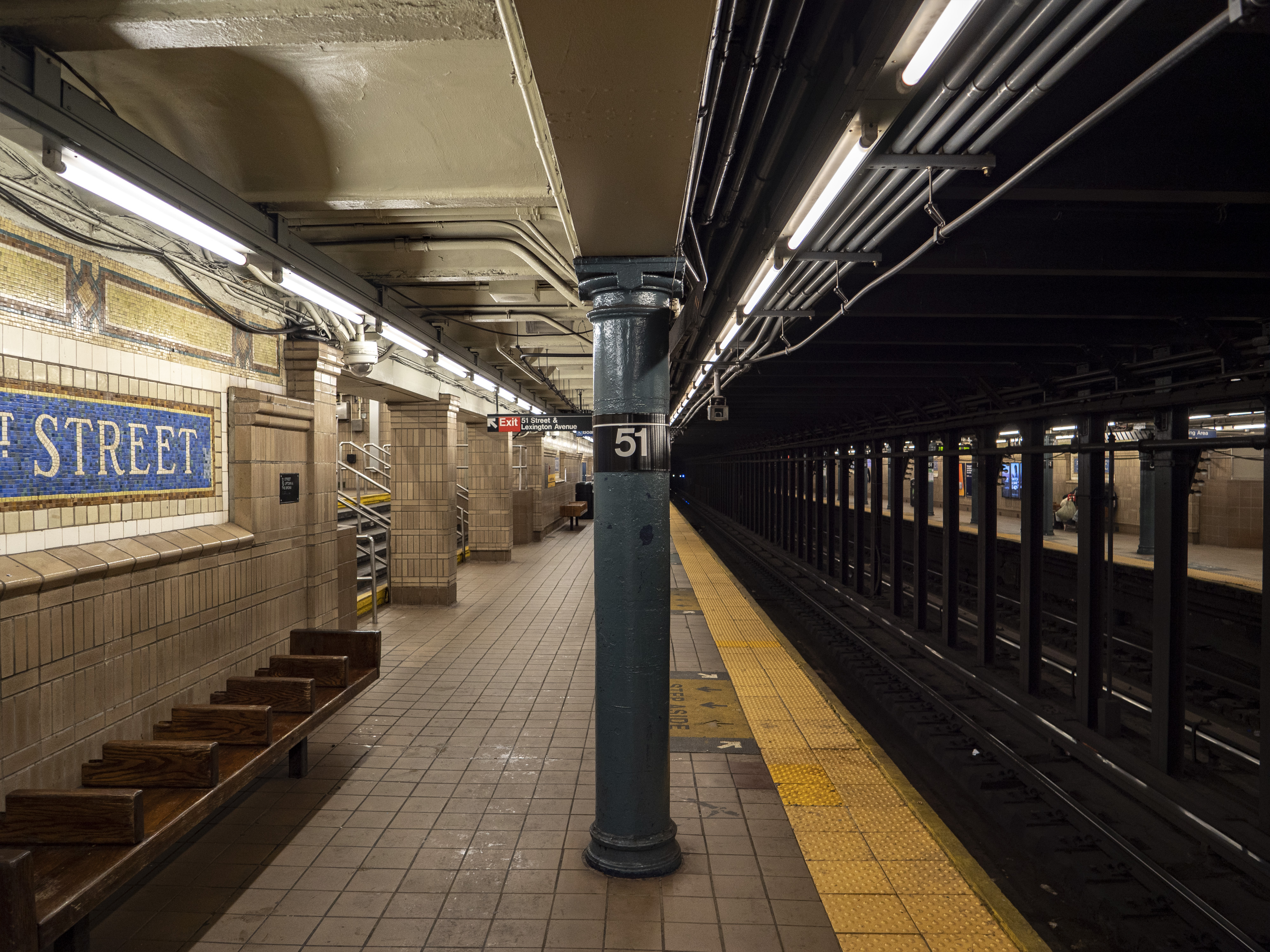
- View from northbound platform

Station statistics
- Address: East 51st Street & Lexington Avenue; New York, New York 40.757075°N 73.971977°W
- Division: A (IRT)
- Line: IRT Lexington Avenue Line
- Services: 4 (late nights); 6 (all times) <6> (weekdays until 8:45 p.m., peak direction)
- Platforms: 2 side platforms
- Tracks: 2

Other information
- Opened: July 17, 1918; 108 years ago
- Accessible: Yes
Services
Preceding station	New York City Subway	Following station
59th Street 4 6 <6> toward Pelham Bay Park	Local	Grand Central–42nd Street 4 6 <6> toward Brooklyn Bridge–City Hall
does not stop here
Track layout
Station service legend
Symbol	Description
Stops all times	Stops all times
Stops late nights only	Stops late nights only
Stops rush hours in the peak direction only	Stops rush hours in the peak direction only

The 51st Street station on the IRT Lexington Avenue Line is a local station with two local tracks and two side platforms. The station is served by the 6 train at all times, the <6> train on weekdays in the peak direction during the day, and the 4 train at night. The two express tracks, used by the 4 and 5 trains during daytime hours, pass through on a lower level and are not visible from the platforms. The station is between 59th Street to the north and Grand Central–42nd Street to the south. Both platforms have emergency exits from the lower level express tracks.

The station features modern beige bricks over the original tiles, but the standard IRT-style mosaics remain intact. There is a crossunder at the extreme north end of the platforms with an elevator, a staircase, and an up-only escalator on each side.

The platforms are approximately 25 feet (7.6 m) below street level and the station's full-time fare control areas are at the center of each. A staircase of seven steps goes up to a turnstile bank, with a token booth and two exits to each corner on each side outside fare control.

This station is the southernmost station on the Lexington Avenue Line to be directly under Lexington Avenue itself. South of here, the line shifts slightly westward to Park Avenue.

=== Image gallery ===
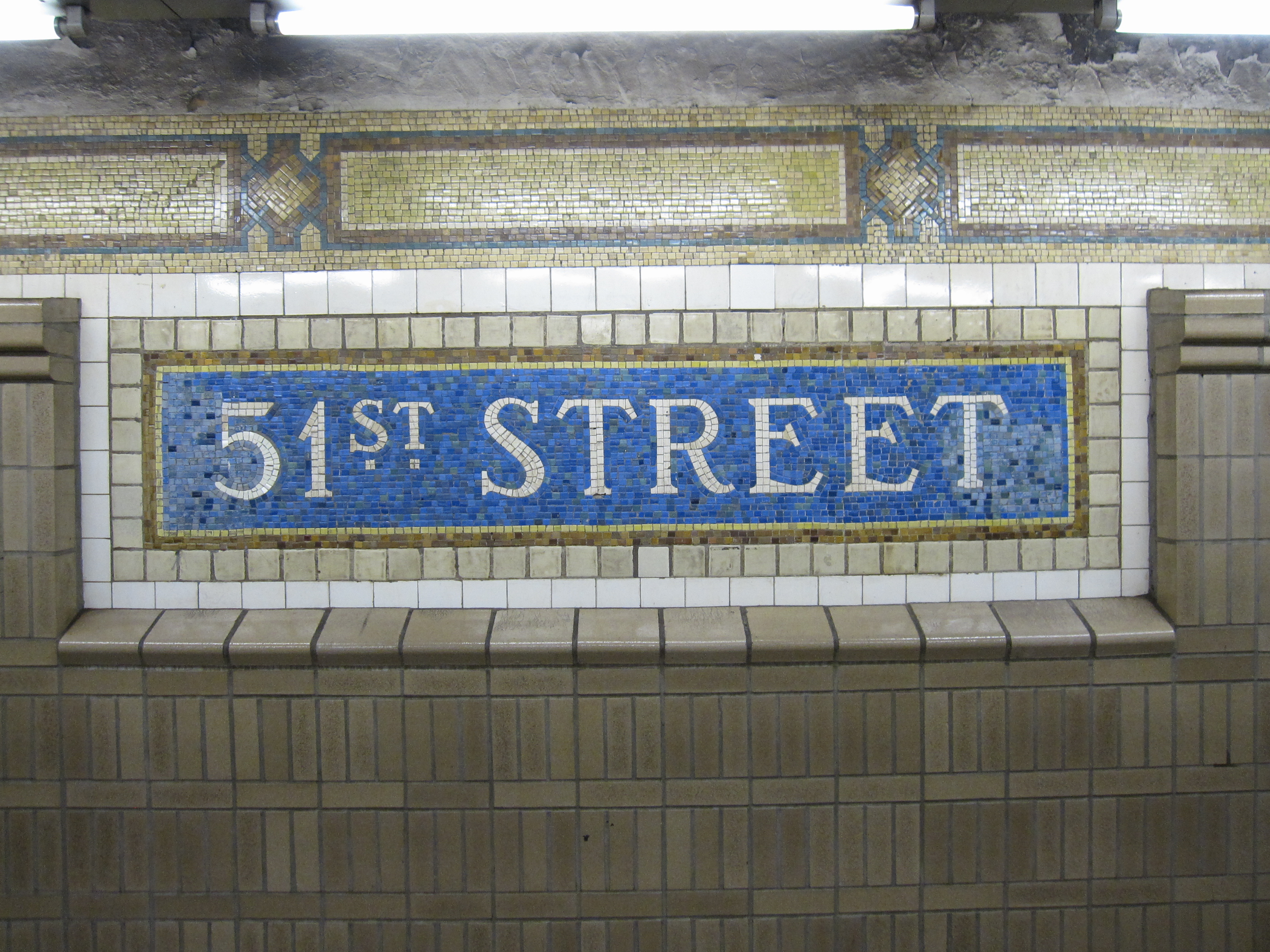
Mosaic name tablet

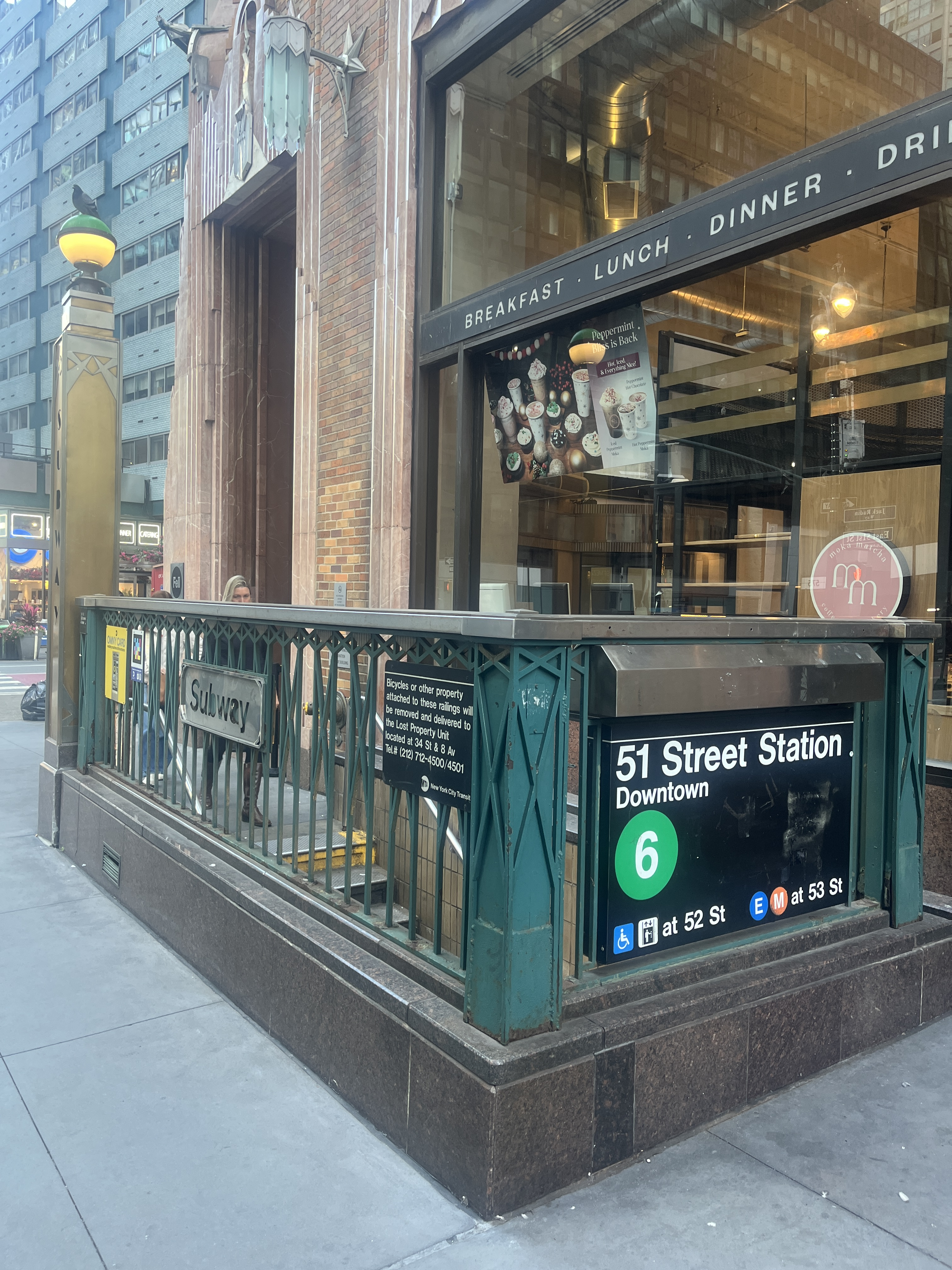
51st Street entrance to the southbound platform

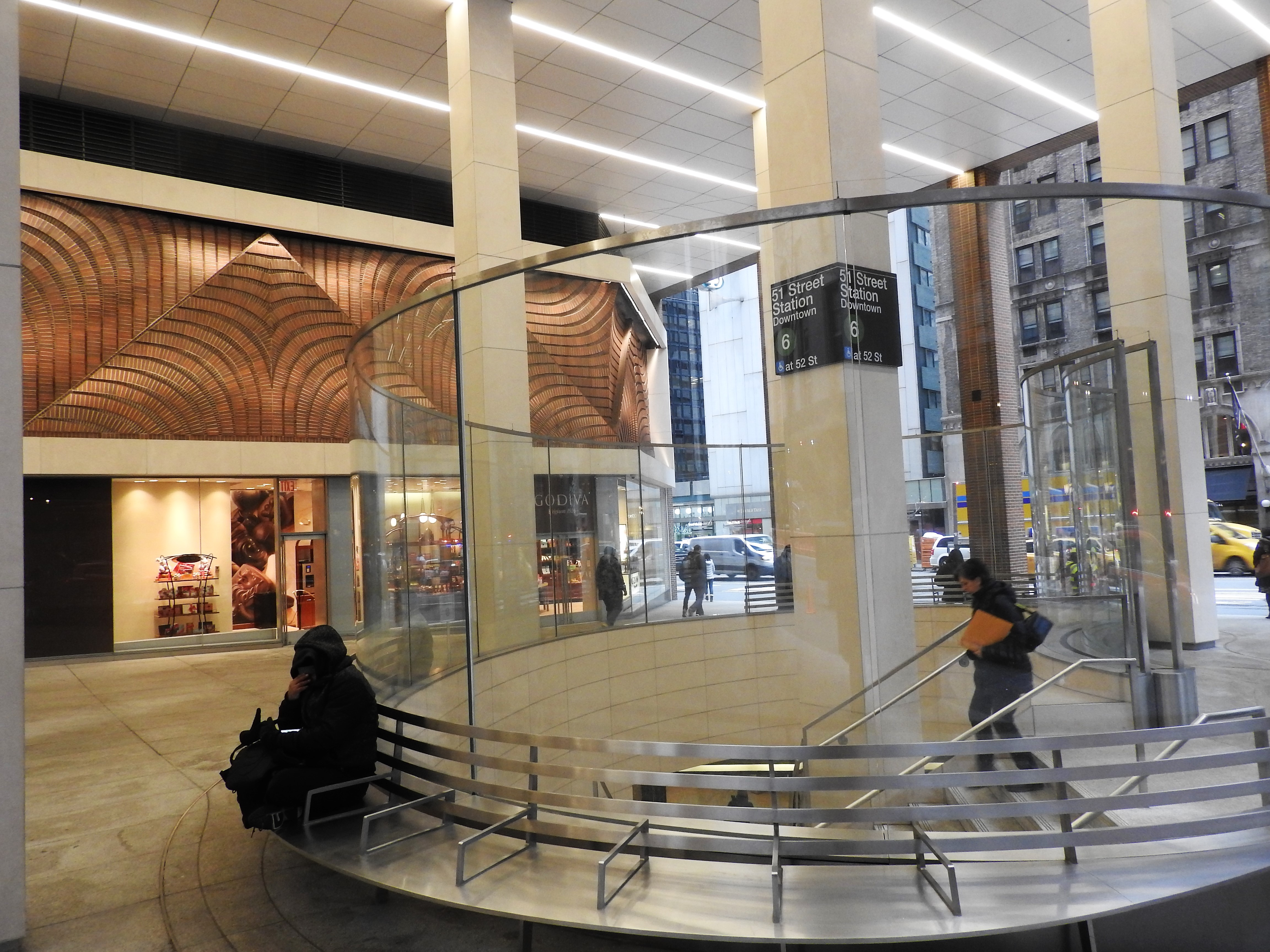
50th Street entrance to the southbound platform

== IND Queens Boulevard Line platform ==
Lexington Avenue–53 Street
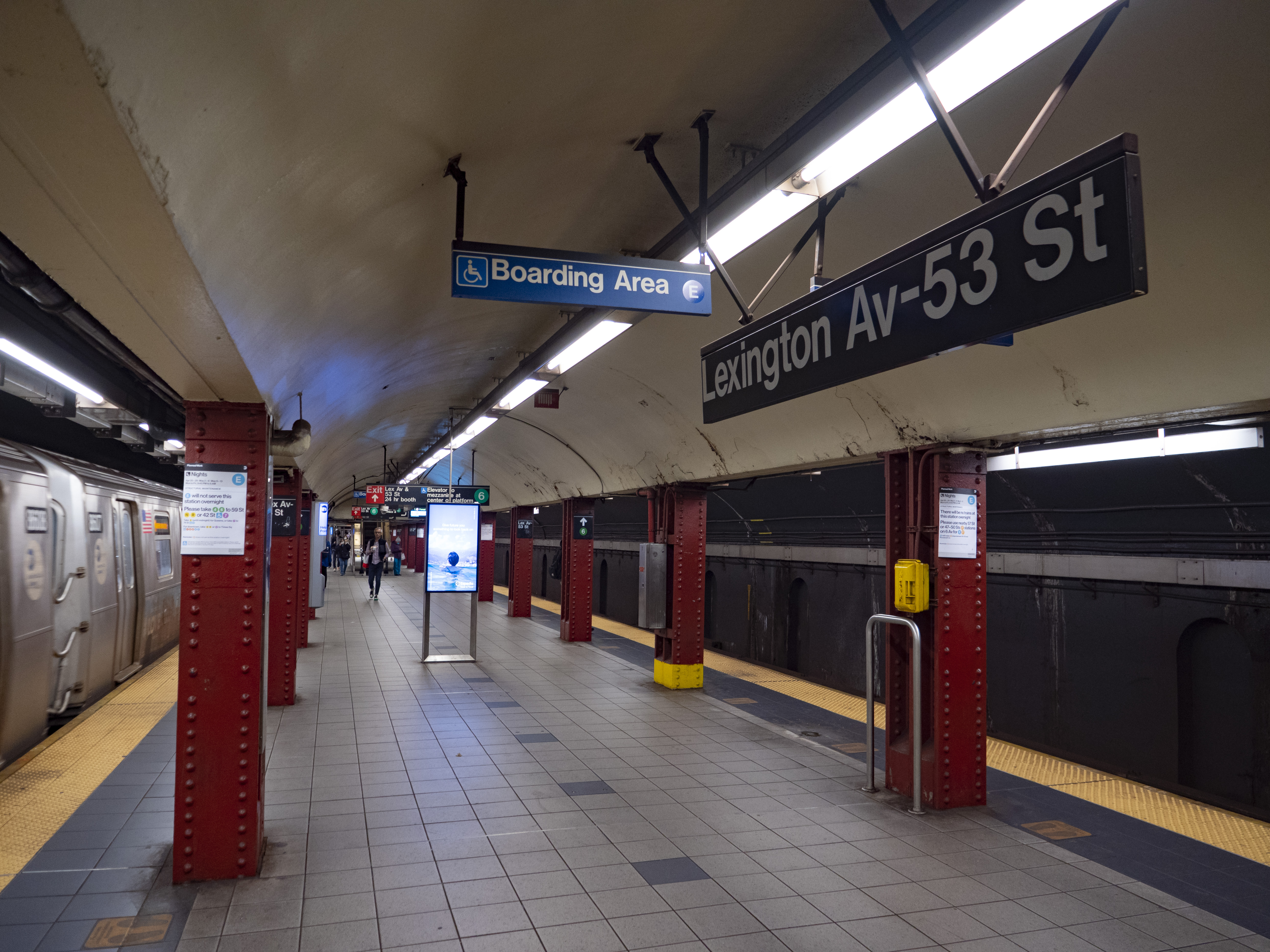
- View down the platform

Station statistics
- Address: Lexington Avenue & East 53rd Street; New York, New York
- Division: B (IND)
- Line: IND Queens Boulevard Line
- Services: E (all times); F (weekday) <F> (two rush hour trains, peak direction)
- Platforms: 1 island platform
- Tracks: 2

Other information
- Opened: August 19, 1933; 93 years ago
- Accessible: Yes
- Former/other names: Lexington–3rd Avenues
Services
Preceding station	New York City Subway	Following station
Fifth Avenue/53rd Street E F <F> services split	E (New York City Subway service) F (New York City Subway service)	Court Square–23rd Street E F <F> via Forest Hills–71st Avenue
Track layout
Station service legend
Symbol	Description
Stops all times	Stops all times
Stops weekdays during the day	Stops weekdays during the day

The Lexington Avenue–53rd Street station on the IND Queens Boulevard Line opened on August 19, 1933 and has two tracks and one island platform. The E train serves the station at all times, while the F train serves the station on weekdays during the day. Limited <F> trains serve the station northbound during AM rush hours and southbound during PM rush hours. The station is between Court Square–23rd Street to the east (railroad north) and Fifth Avenue/53rd Street to the west (railroad south). East of this station, the line goes under the East River to Long Island City, Queens.

It was built 70 feet (21 m) below street level. As a result, long escalators and staircases are required to reach the mezzanine from the platform. At the extreme west end of the Queens Boulevard Line platform, a single staircase and a bank of two escalators (which once had the highest vertical rise of any escalator in the U.S.), a single escalator, and one ADA-accessible elevator go up to the full-time mezzanine. The escalators have a vertical rise of 56 feet (17 m). There are no tiles, trim line, or mosaics on the track walls.

=== Image gallery ===
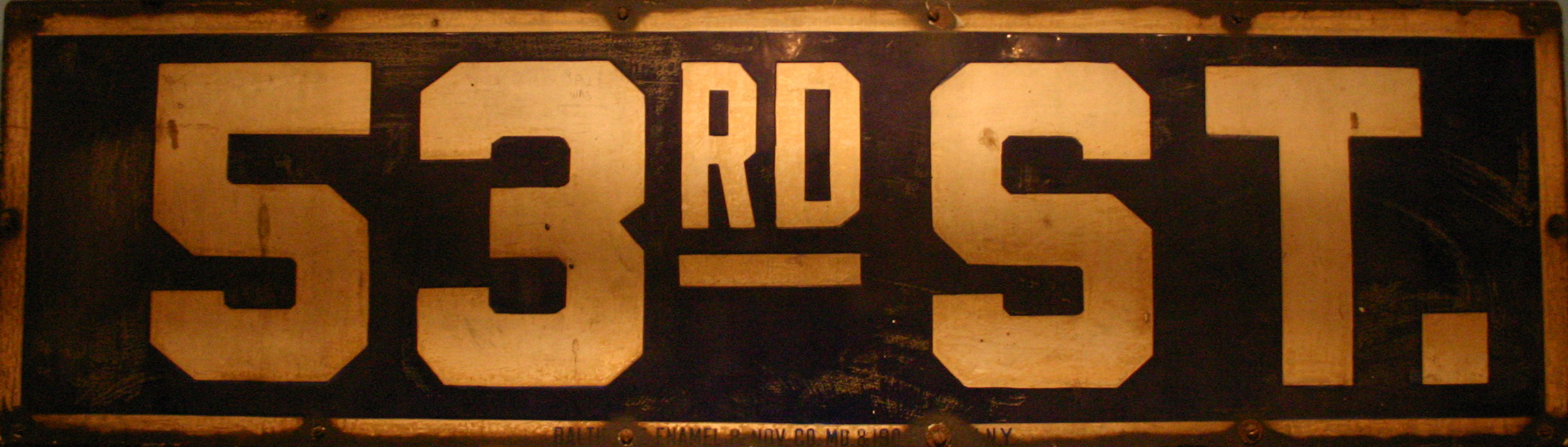
Older signage, since removed from the station

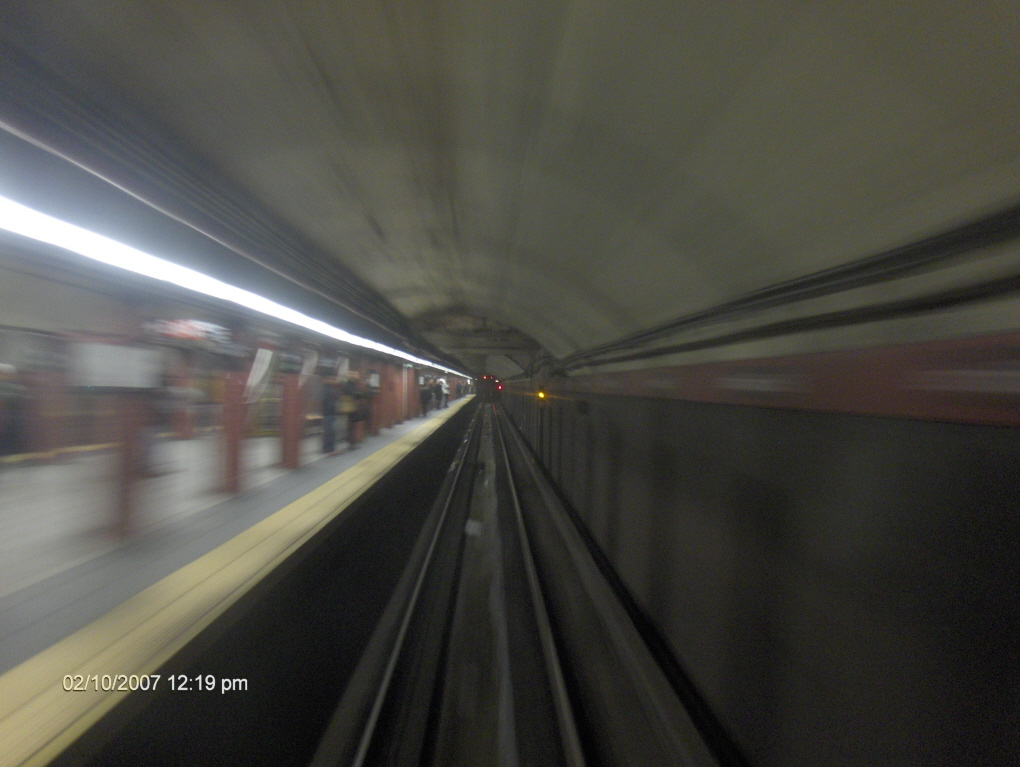
As seen from the front of an arriving train

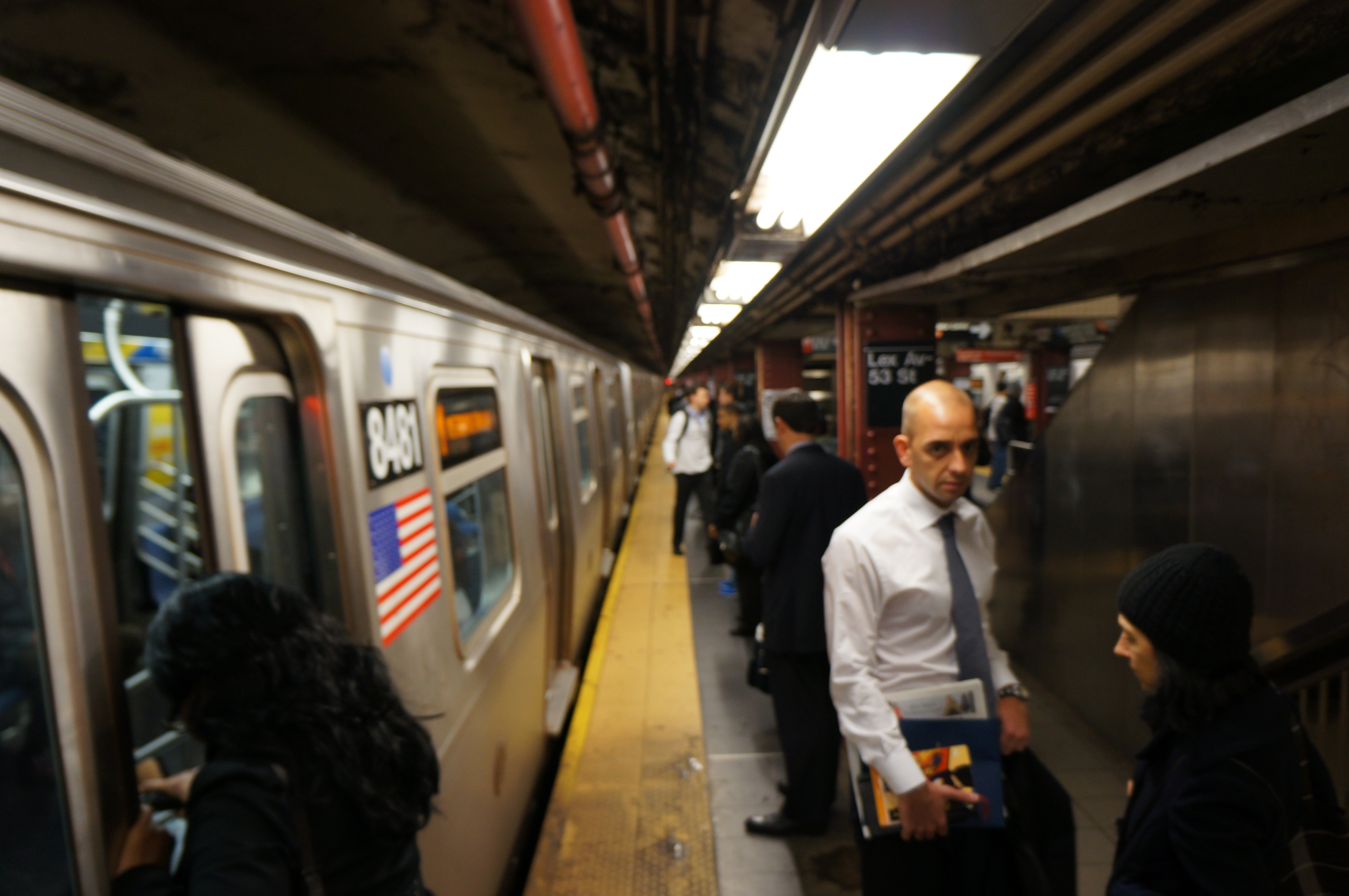
An M train of R160As on the downtown track

== Proposed Second Avenue Subway station ==
After the MTA indicated in the 1990s that it would construct the Second Avenue Subway, the agency considered including a transfer between the Lexington Avenue/51st Street station complex and the proposed 55th Street station on the Second Avenue Subway, which would be located under Second Avenue between 52nd Street and 56th Street. This would provide a transfer to the proposed T train, which would serve the Second Avenue Line upon completion of Phase 3, although that phase was not funded or scheduled as of 2017. The transfer was evaluated as part of a 2004 environmental impact statement for the Second Avenue Subway.

If built, the proposed transfer passage would run under 53rd Street between the eastern end of the Queens Boulevard Line platform and Second Avenue, connecting to the southern end of 55th Street station. The MTA projects that providing a transfer between the Queens Boulevard and Second Avenue lines would reduce crowding in the existing transfer passage between the Queens Boulevard and Lexington Avenue lines at the western end of the Queens Boulevard Line platform.
