= Thurgood Marshall Federal Judiciary Building =

Government building in Washington, DC

Coordinates: 38.8966°N 77.0043°W

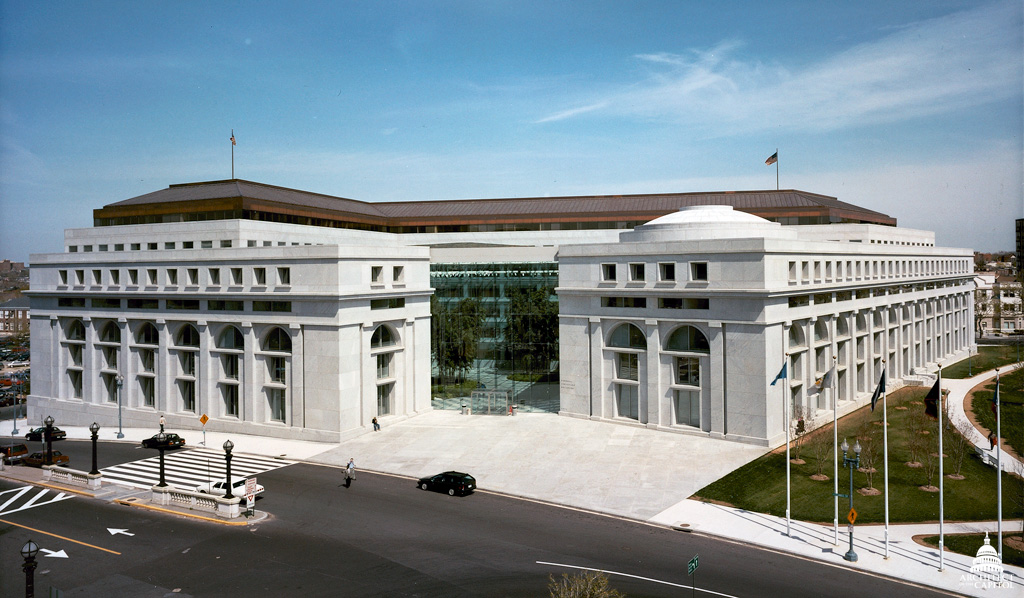
Exterior view

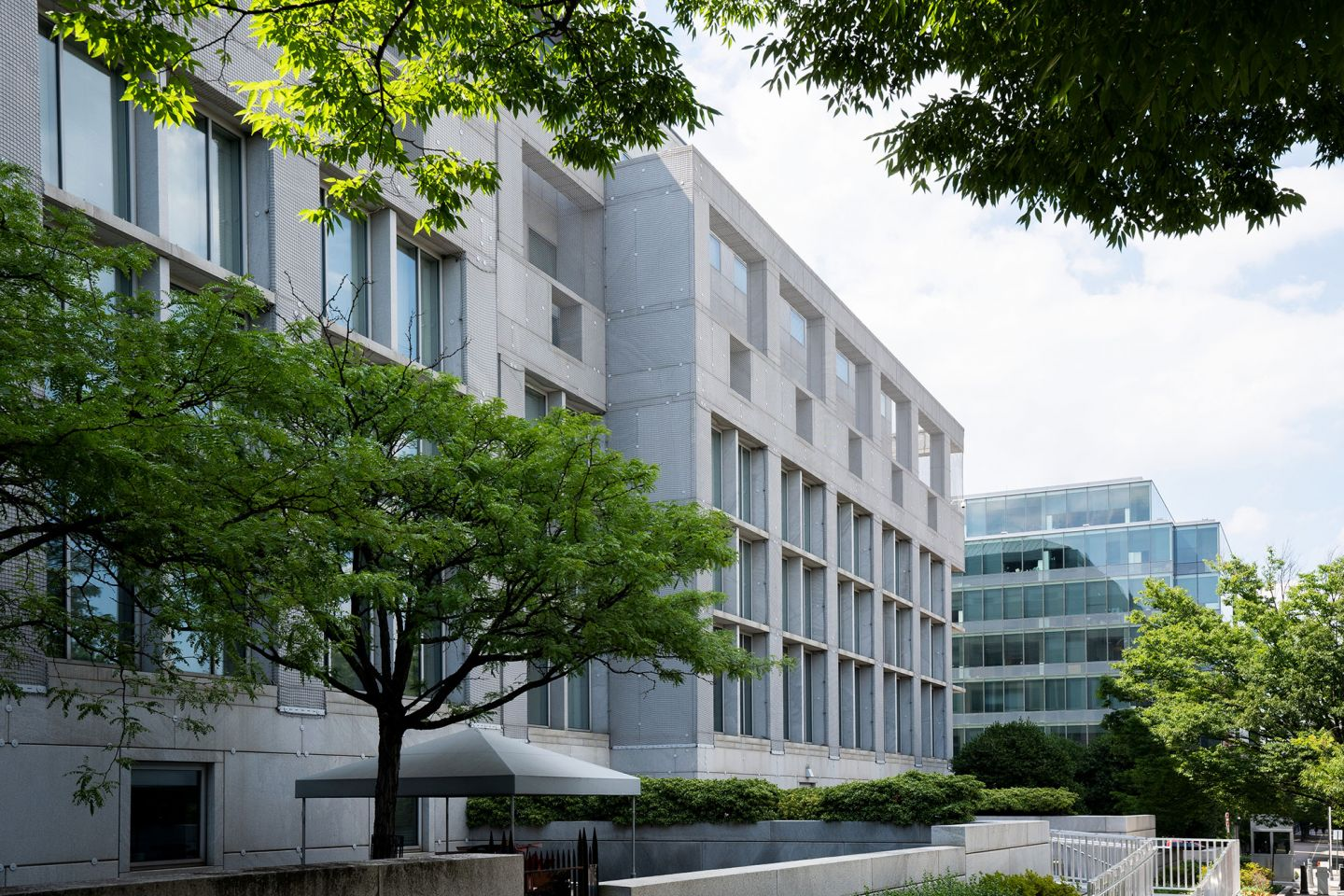
All facades of the building were designed to be complementary to their surrounding government buildings

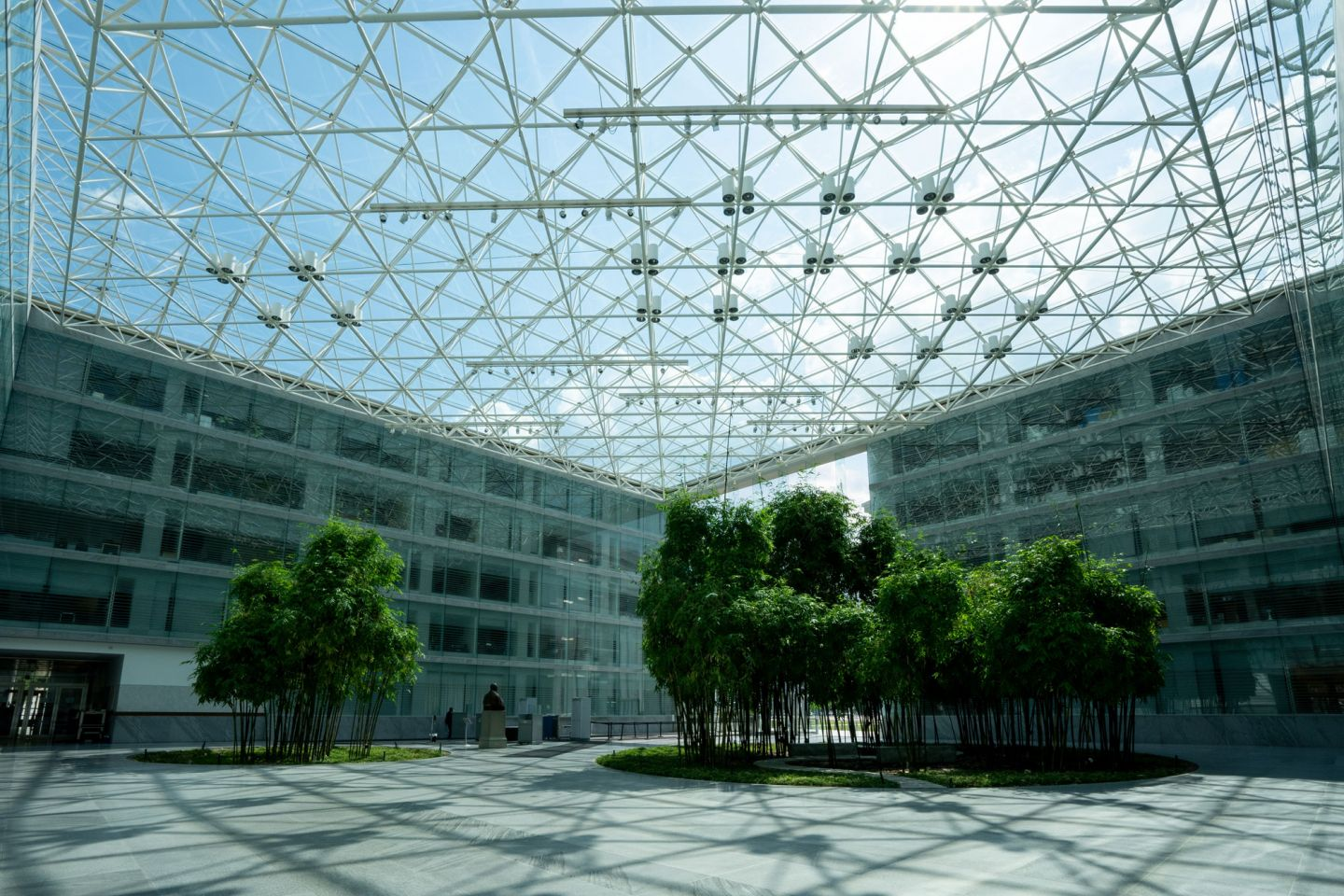
Bamboo from North Carolina in the atrium of the Thurgood Marshall Federal Judiciary Building, Washington D.C.

The Thurgood Marshall Federal Judiciary Building (TMFJB) at the crossroads of the Capitol Hill and NoMA neighborhoods in Washington, D.C., houses offices that support the work of the United States Courts, including the Administrative Office of the United States Courts, the Federal Judicial Center, the United States Sentencing Commission, and the Office of the Clerk of the Judicial Panel on Multidistrict Litigation.

The building was named after Thurgood Marshall, the first African-American justice of the Supreme Court; and is part of the United States Capitol Complex under the Architect of the Capitol's Supreme Court Building and Grounds jurisdiction which it shares in common with the United States Supreme Court Building that houses the Supreme Court of the United States.

It is located at One Columbus Circle NE in Washington D.C. adjacent to Union Station, a few blocks from the United States Capitol. It was completed in 1992 and was designed by architecture firm Edward Larrabee Barnes and partner John Ming Yee Lee. It features a dramatic five-story tall glass atrium at its main entrance with a signature indoor bamboo forest. A jury unanimously selected the firm of Barnes/Lee & Partners as the architects and Boston Properties as the developer. Chief Justice William H. Rehnquist approved the selection on January 13, 1989.

The Thurgood Marshall Federal Judiciary Building is an administrative center for the federal court system located next to Union Station. Its construction completed the Columbus Circle area and was considered a long overdue addition to the Washington DC's Union Station and post office.

== Financing ==
By the terms of the innovative financing package, the Architect of the Capitol, George White, agreed to lease the site and finished building to the developer for thirty years, at which time it would revert to the government at no cost. Rents would be used to amortize the privately raised debt. Not since the 1790s, when the board of commissioners attempted to finance the Capitol and White House through the sale of city lots, had such unconventional financing been tried on a federal construction project. Unlike the commissioners' bungled efforts, however, this financing scheme proved entirely satisfactory.
