= Edward Linde =

American real estate developer

Edward H. Linde
- Born: 22 June 1941; Brooklyn, New York City, US
- Died: 10 January 2010 (aged 68); Boston, Massachusetts, US
- Education: MIT (B.S., Civil Engineering, 1962); Harvard Business School (MBA, 1964)
- Occupation: Real estate developer
- Spouse: Joyce Goldfine
- Children: 2

Edward H. Linde (June 22, 1941 – January 10, 2010) was an American real estate developer and philanthropist in Boston, Massachusetts. Alongside Mortimer B. Zuckerman, he co-founded Boston Properties in 1970.

== Biography ==
Linde was born to a Jewish family in Brooklyn on June 22, 1941, the son of Irving and Dorothy Linde. In 1958, he moved to Boston in 1958 to attend MIT where he studied civil engineering and graduated in 1962. In 1964, he graduated from Harvard Business School and went to work for Cabot, Cabot & Forbes where he met Mortimer B. Zuckerman.

He and Zuckerman redeveloped much of East Cambridge into the area now known as Kendall Square, helping create a U.S. technology hub, with Harvard and MIT researchers mixing with firms such as Google, Microsoft, Biogen Idec, and Novartis. In Boston, Linde was responsible for properties such as the office towers at 28 State Street and One Boston Place. Perhaps his most prominent contribution to the city was the Prudential Center, where he helped transform a disjointed area into a retail mecca. In 2007, he was succeeded as company president by his son, Douglas T. Linde.

Forbes ranked him tied as the 840th richest billionaire worldwide in 2007, with a net worth of US$1.1 billion.

== Philanthropy ==
Linde was chairman of the board of the Boston Symphony Orchestra, a director of Jobs for Massachusetts, WGBH, and Boston World Partnership, and a trustee at the Beth Israel Deaconess Medical Center. The west wing of Boston's Museum of Fine Arts is named after him, his wife, and the Linde family in recognition of the more than $25 million they donated to the museum. He also was a major donor to his alma mater, the Massachusetts Institute of Technology, the Dana–Farber Cancer Institute, and Combined Jewish Philanthropies of Greater Boston.

== Personal life ==
In 1963, he married Joyce Goldfine (born 1943) whom he had met in college; they had two children, Douglas Linde and Karen Linde Packman.

Linde died from pneumonia in 2010.

As of 2016, Joyce Linde was worth $1.5 billion.
