= CityCenterDC =

Mixed-use development in Washington, D.C.

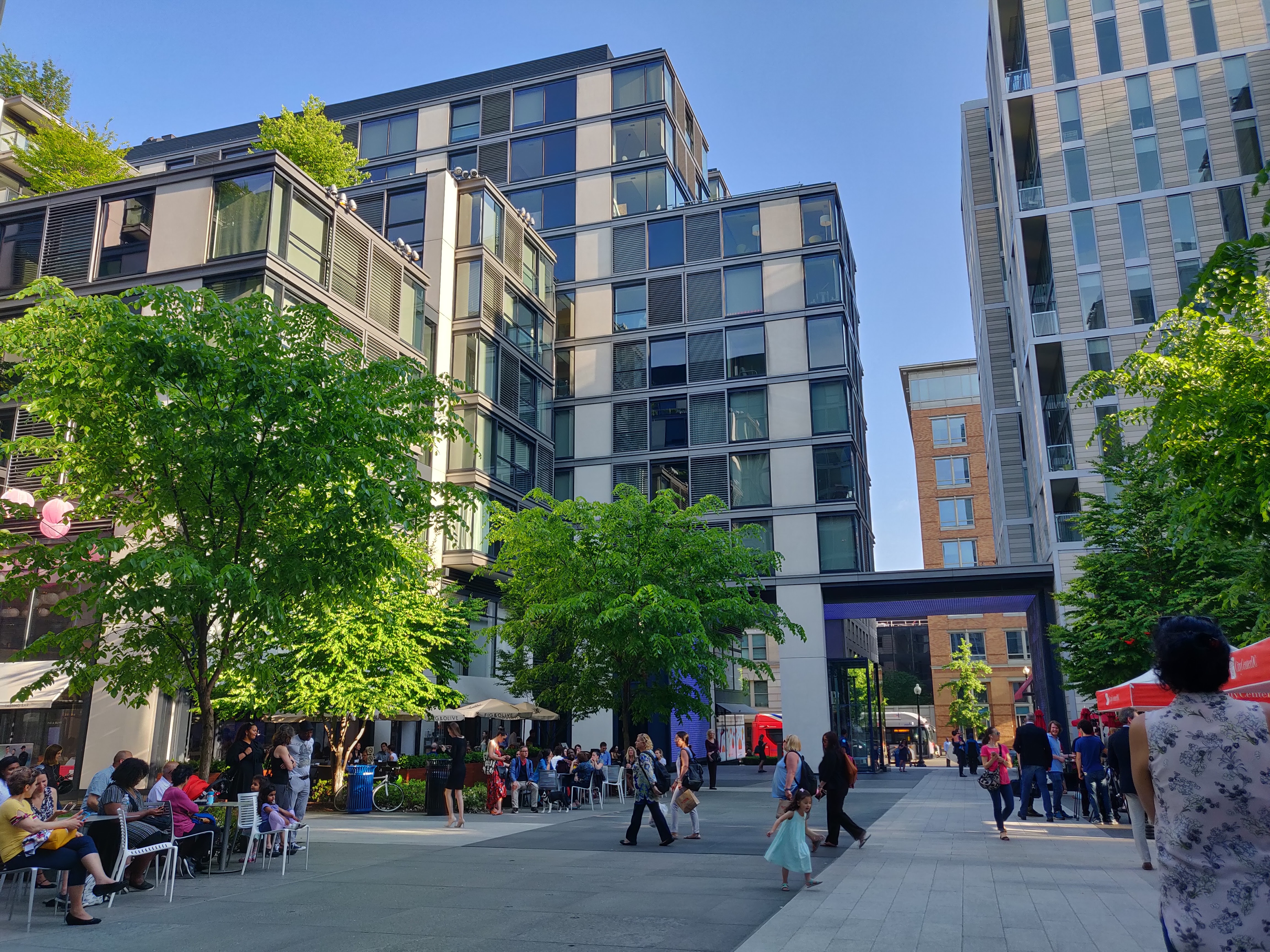
- The central plaza within the complex
- Interactive map of CityCenterDC
- Location: Washington, D.C., U.S.
- Coordinates: 38.900343°N 77.024959°W
- Status: Completed (Phase I)
- Groundbreaking: 2011
- Estimated completion: 2015
- Website: citycenterdc.com

Companies
- Architect: Foster and Partners, Shalom Barnes, Gustafson Guthrie Nichol
- Developer: Hines Archstone

Technical details
- Cost: US$950,000,000
- Buildings: 6
- Size: 10.2 acres (4.1 ha)
- Leasable area: 2,000,000 square feet (190,000 m^{2})

CityCenterDC, colloquially called CityCenter, is a mixed-use development consisting of two condominium buildings, two rental apartment buildings, two office buildings, a luxury hotel, and public park in downtown Washington, D.C. It encompasses 2,000,000 square feet (190,000 m^{2}) and covers more than five city blocks. The $950 million development began construction on April 4, 2011, on the site of the former Washington Convention Center—a 10.2-acre (4.1 ha) site bounded by New York Avenue NW, 9th Street NW, H Street NW, and 11th Street NW. Most of the development was completed by June 2015. Metro Center and Gallery Place, two of the city's busiest Metro stations, are within three blocks of CityCenter.

The development is one of the largest 21st-century downtown projects in the United States, and the largest urban development on the East Coast of the United States until the December 2012 groundbreaking of Manhattan's Hudson Yards. The D.C. deputy mayor for economic development characterized the project in 2004 as "the capstone of an effort to move the center of energy from the Mall to downtown". In 2007, D.C. Mayor Adrian Fenty called the development a "live, work and play environment unlike anywhere else in D.C."

== Geography ==
CityCenter occupies a 10-acre lot in downtown Washington, D.C., bounded by 11th Street NW on the west, New York Avenue NW on the north, 9th Street NW on the east, and H Street NW on the south. 10th Street NW runs north–south through CityCenter, and I Street NW runs between 9th and 10th streets. CityCenter is within a few blocks walking distance from both Metro Center and Gallery Place/Chinatown Metro stations.

=== Palmer Alley ===
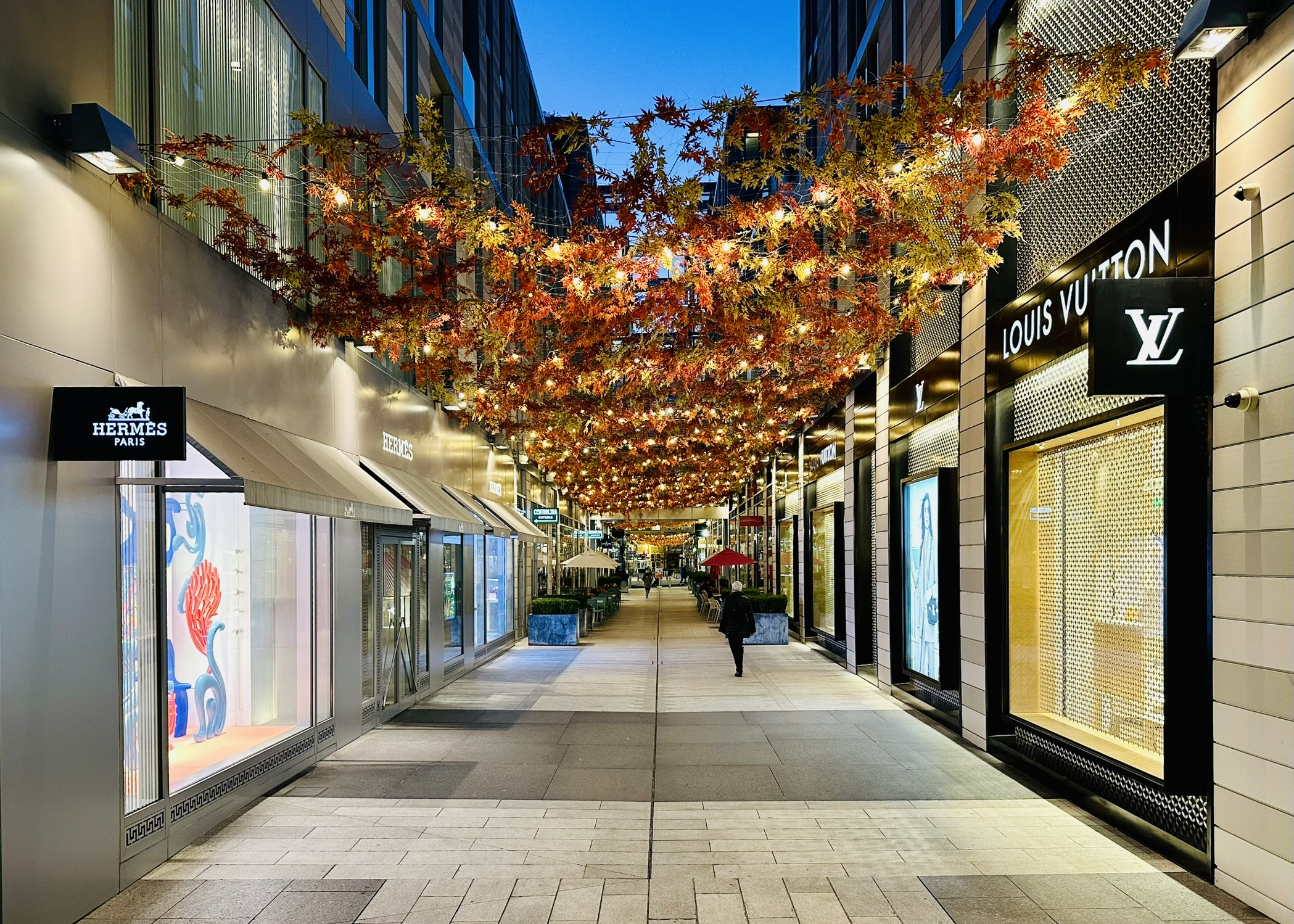
Several high-end retailers are located on Palmer Alley.

The main spine through CityCenter is Palmer Alley, a three-block long pedestrian mall running east–west through the middle of the development. Palmer Alley is one of Washington, D.C.'s only pedestrianized streets, on which motor vehicles are not allowed. It is frequently lined with public art Historically, the site featured a network of alleys that shaped its urban character. However, the construction of the old convention center imposed a superblock, erasing these features and disrupting the finer grain of the city. During the site's redesign, the alleys were thoughtfully reintroduced to break down the scale, improve walkability, and reconnect with the site's historic fabric.

=== The Plaza at CityCenter ===
Between 9th and 10th streets, Palmer Alley runs through a plaza that extends north–south between H and I streets. The plaza features patio seating for several restaurants, fountains, and a video art installation. In designing the plaza, the landscape architects drew inspiration from quilting traditions, specifically the vibrant and improvisational patterns of the Gee’s Bend quilts. As a tribute to Washington, DC’s rich African-American heritage, these patterns informed the layout, weaving cultural memory into the very fabric of the space.

=== The Park at CityCenter ===
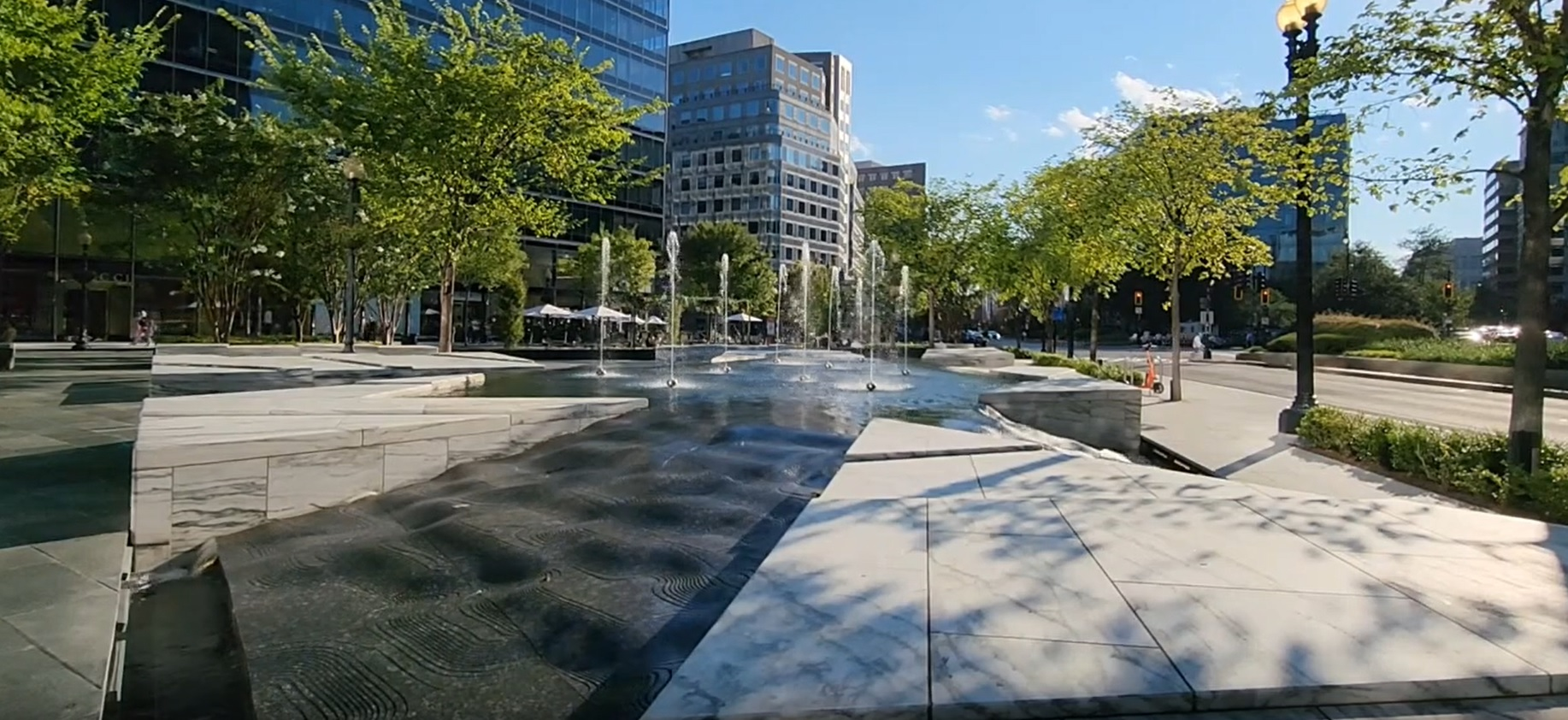
Fountain at the park

The northwest corner of CityCenter is a park that regularly hosts events and art installations, including an annual 75-foot Christmas tree, a summer farmers market, and other interactive exhibits. The park features a large fountain, placed with historical intention. In Pierre Charles L’Enfant's original plan for Washington, he envisioned a grand fountain at this very location. Honoring that vision, the designers incorporated the fountain into the modern layout. The marble used throughout the park is the same type found at the Washington Monument, reinforcing a material link to the city’s monumental core. The park also forms a bow tie shape with its counterpart across the street — a configuration found throughout Washington, DC. These bow tie spaces were part of the L'Enfant Plan from the beginning, blending geometry, symmetry, and purpose into the city’s fabric.

== Tenants ==
CityCenter is home to many stores and restaurants, as well as offices, apartments, condominiums, and a hotel, fulfilling the planners' goals for tenancy, although the development has been criticized for a lack of foot traffic.

=== Offices ===
The law firm of Covington & Burling occupies a majority of the office space at CityCenter, with more than 500 lawyers spread between two buildings. The American Hospital Association also has an office in CityCenter, as does the Qatar Foundation.

=== Retail ===
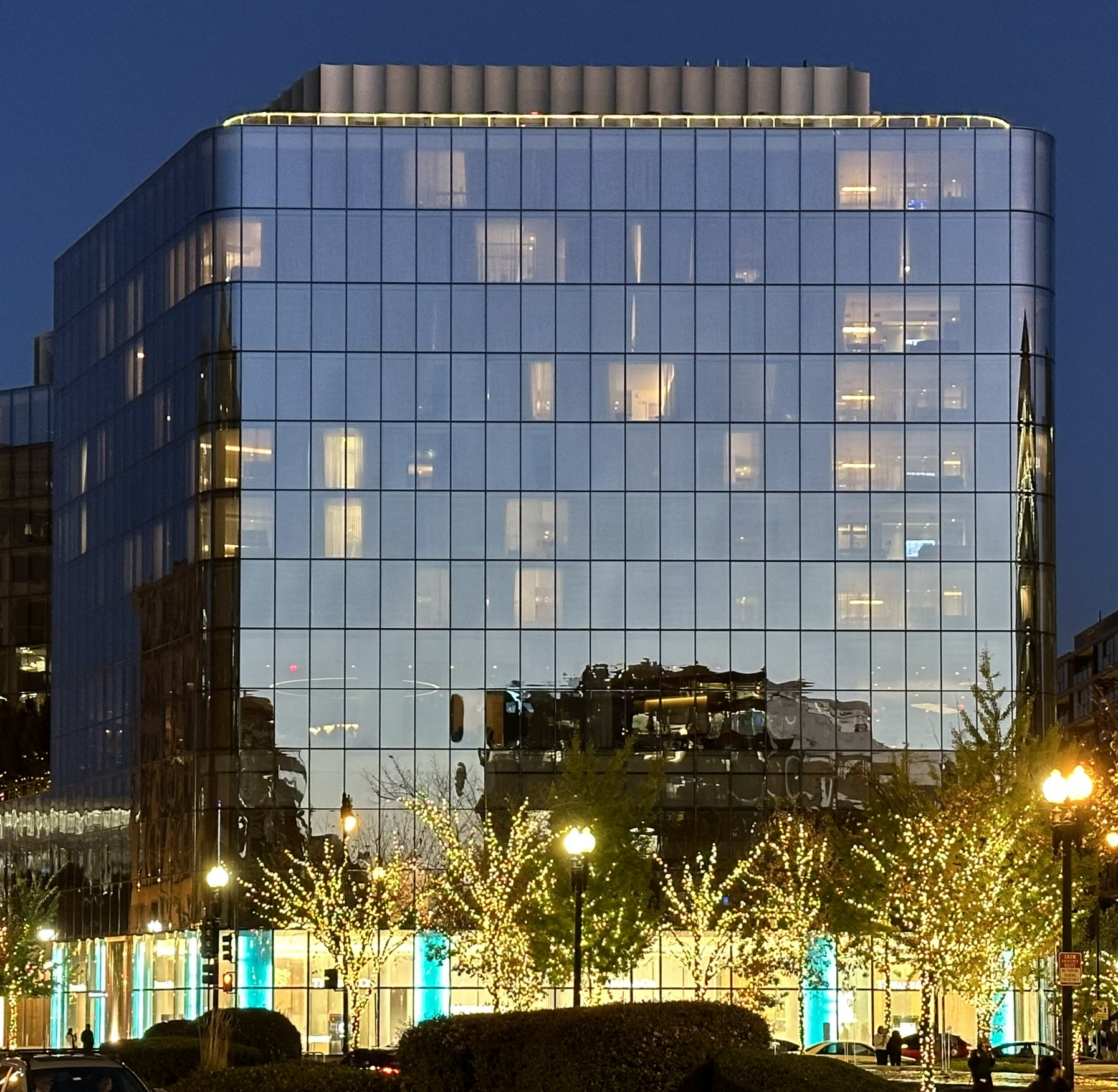
Conrad Washington, D.C.

Many high-end retail stores are found in CityCenter, including Louis Vuitton, Dior, Hermès, Burberry, Gucci, Salvatore Ferragamo, Hugo Boss, David Yurman, Loro Piana, Morgenthal Frederics, Kate Spade New York, Akris, Carolina Herrera, Allen Edmonds, Longchamp, Arc'teryx, TUMI, Giorgio Armani, Brioni, Paul Stuart, Brunello Cucinelli, Jo Malone London, VINCE., Christian Louboutin, Bulgari, Brietling, Chanel, and Moncler. A Tesla dealership opened in 2017.

A Tiffany & Co. store opened in March 2019 in the Conrad hotel.

=== Restaurants ===
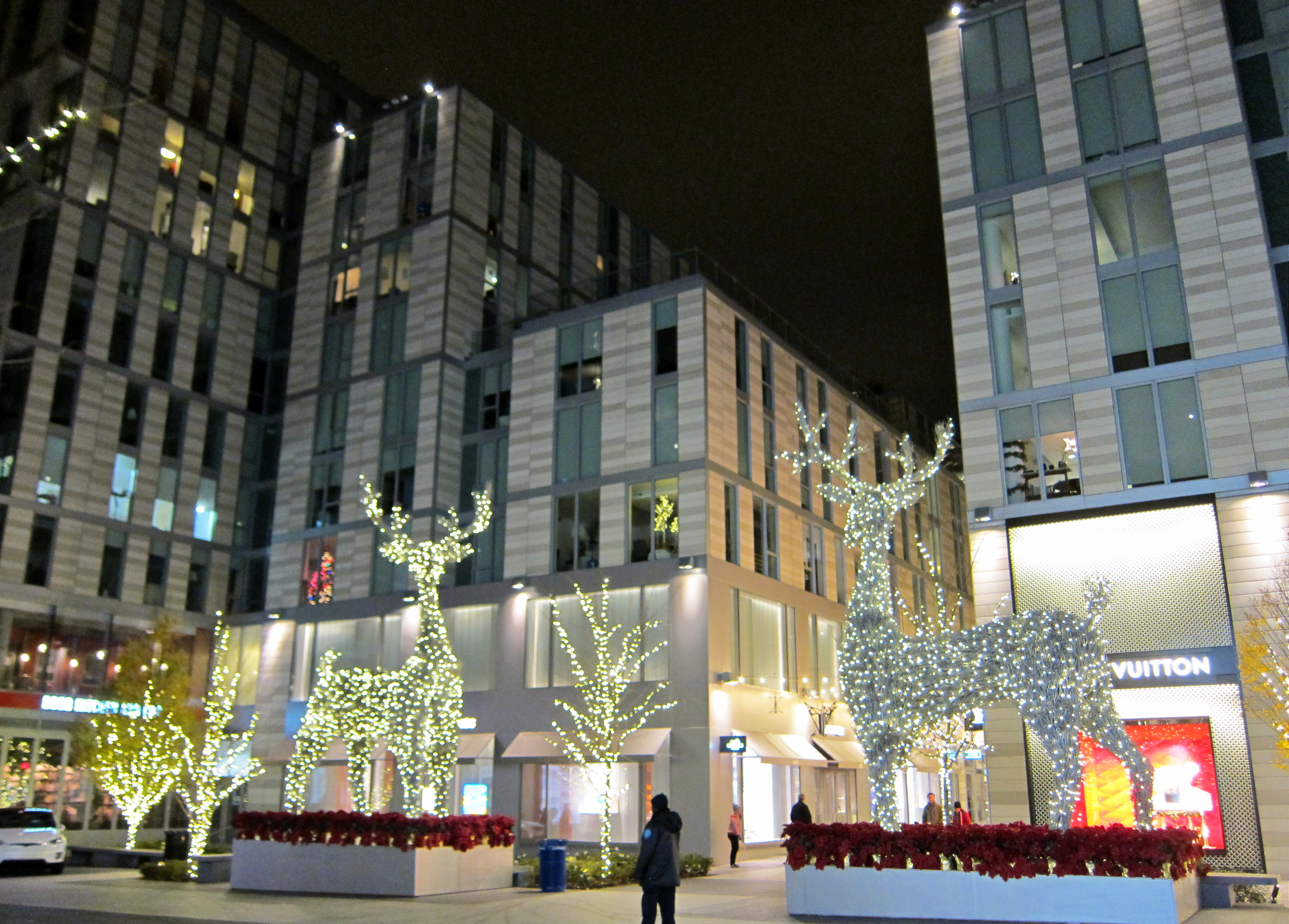
CityCenterDC Plaza decorated during Christmas

Restaurants at CityCenter include Momofuku CCDC and Milk Bar. There is also a DBGB Kitchen & Bar and a Del Frisco's Double Eagle Steak House, Mediterranean restaurant Fig & Olive, and Italian restaurant and market Centrolina. Smaller cafes include the Fruitive juice bar, Dolcezza Gelato & Coffee and Tatte Bakery & Café.

In 2019, Bryan Voltaggio and Michael Voltaggio opened a restaurant called Estuary in the Conrad hotel.

=== Hotel ===
The Hilton Conrad hotel opened in 2019 with 360 guest rooms and 32,000 square feet of meeting and event space.

=== Notable residents ===
Notable residents at CityCenter include former Washington Wizards coach Scott Brooks, former attorney general Eric Holder, and Senator Claire McCaskill. White House aides Hope Hicks and Stephen Miller also lived in CityCenter.

== Planning ==
=== First stages of planning ===
The Washington Convention Center, Washington, D.C.'s second convention center, opened on December 10, 1982. But just eight years later, the facility's small size and a nationwide boom in the construction of convention centers had caused the 285,000-square-foot (26,500 m^{2}) convention center to see a dramatic drop in business. In May 1990, the city unveiled plans for a new $685 million, 2,300,000-square-foot (210,000 m^{2}) convention center. Ground was broken for the new Walter E. Washington Convention Center on October 2, 1998.

Differing plans were suggested for redevelopment of the site of the existing convention center. In 1998, leaders of the John F. Kennedy Center for the Performing Arts, Library of Congress, Smithsonian Institution, and the Federal City Council proposed construction of a $1 billion development that would include a hotel, music museum, and retail space. In 1999, a D.C. government study proposed constructing a new Major League Baseball stadium at the site.

Anthony A. Williams, Mayor of the District of Columbia, established a task force in July 2000 to advise the city on how to redevelop the Washington Convention Center site. Although the mayor's task force had not issued its report, on November 14, 2000, Williams unveiled a city-wide development plan that proposed constructing a major new public attraction (such as a museum) on the land. The plan also suggested building city-owned parking garages (to alleviate a severe downtown parking problem), reopening I Street NW and 10th Street NW (both of which had been blocked by the old convention center), and constructing 1,000 apartments or condominiums at the site. The following month, Williams announced that the Office of the Deputy Mayor would oversee the redevelopment design effort. By May 2001, city officials were suggesting a development similar to Yerba Buena Gardens in San Francisco, California, or Faneuil Hall Marketplace in Boston, Massachusetts. The city hoped to open bids regarding the project in 2002. Two months later, Mayor Williams said that his vision for the site included housing, a museum (although not necessarily a music museum), a public park, and a theatre. Other city officials said at that time that instead of the city specifying the structures to be built on the site, the city might issue a request for proposals (RFP) which would give private developers the opportunity to make recommendations for the site's use. In March 2002, the law firm of Skadden, Arps, Slate, Meagher & Flom signed a letter of intent to take office space in any development that was built.

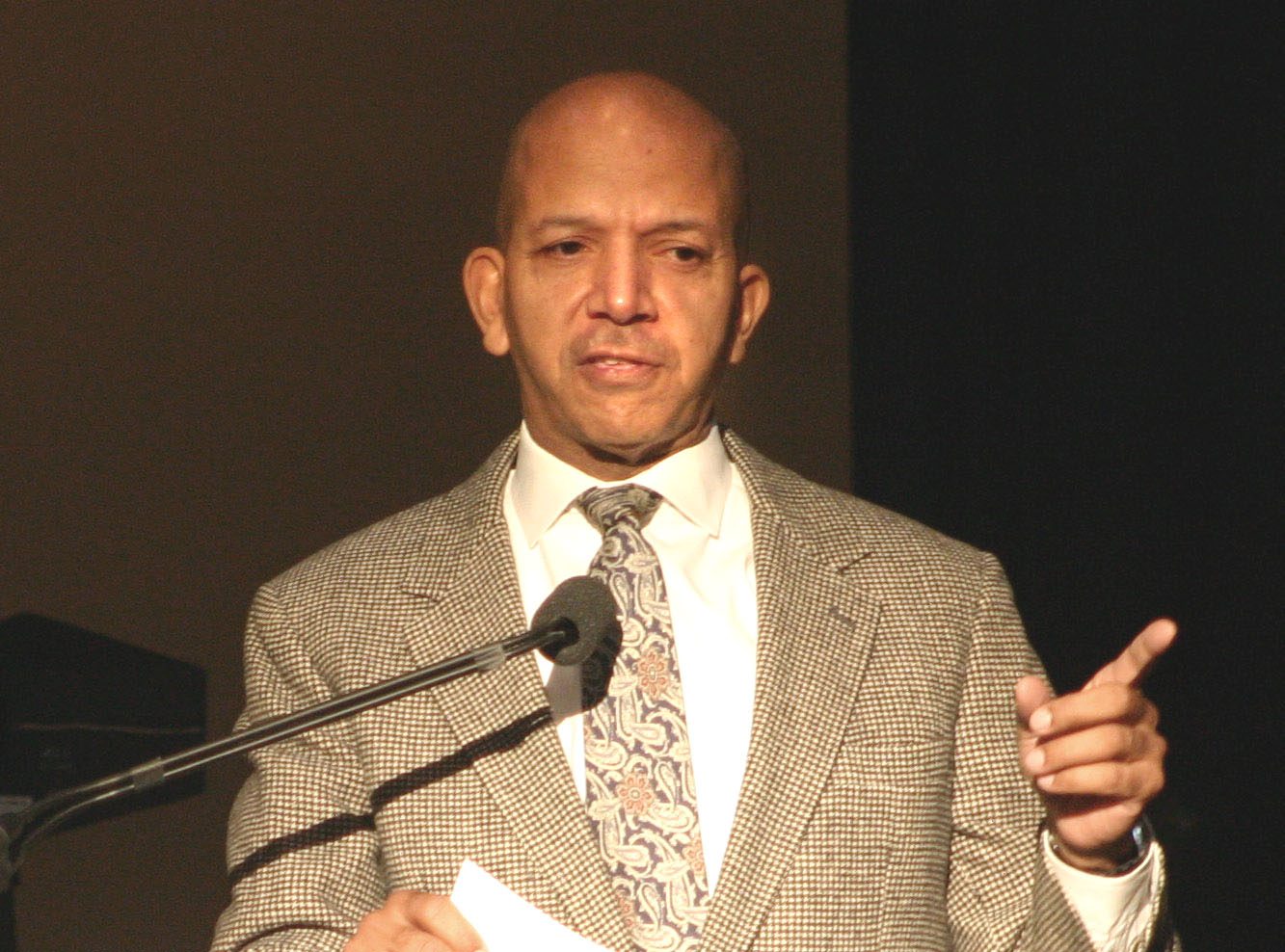
D.C. Mayor Anthony A. Williams, a primary backer of what would become CityCenterDC. Williams' vision for the development guided the project through the design phase.

=== Obstacles ===
The development hit its first obstacle in April 2002 when members of the board of directors of the National Capital Revitalization Corporation (a quasi-public corporation established by the city and charged with helping businesses open and expand in the downtown area) opposed using the existing convention center for any other use than as a convention center. A month later, city officials and developers said that rising land prices within the city limits made using the convention center site for a baseball stadium prohibitively expensive.

Finally, on May 19, 2002, Mayor Williams revealed the results of his two-year task force study. The task force and Williams recommended the construction of a high-rise apartment or condominium building with 600 to 900 units (20 percent of which would be for low-income people or families); 300,000 square feet (28,000 m^{2}) of retail space (which would include retail shops as well as restaurants); a 1 acre (0.40 ha) public park or plaza; at least 1,100 underground parking spaces; and additional facilities which might include a new main public library, a hotel, a music museum, an office building, and/or a theatre complex. Three theatres seating 200, 750, and 2,500 people were envisioned. The task force report constituted a major change in the city's thinking. City planners had originally thought that the site was big enough to contain only a single public attraction, but the task force recommended that the library and museum share exhibit space and be built largely underground so that both could be accommodated. Williams said the task force's vision was to "remake" downtown, so that the project would become as central to Washington, D.C., as the Inner Harbor is to Baltimore, Maryland.

=== Request for proposals ===
Williams submitted a draft RFP to the Council of the District of Columbia in June 2002, and said his goal was to get the RFP approved and project proposals received by the fall of 2002. The RFP was approved, and the city issued it in August. The RFP contained guidelines which any proposal had to meet. These included 1,000 units of housing, 300,000 square feet (28,000 m^{2}) of retail space, more than one theatre (with 70,000 square feet (6,500 m^{2}) of space and a total of at least 3,000 seats), 45,000 square feet (4,200 m^{2}) open space, and a 50,000-square-foot (4,600 m^{2}) public library. The RFP permitted construction of an office building and/or hotel only if it made the project economically viable. Since more than a dozen developers had already expressed interest in the project, city officials believed that it would take only nine months to interview applicants, name finalists, and re-interview the finalists. The RFP also specified that, since the city was unwilling to sell the site outright, the successful bidder would be required to enter into an agreement with the city giving the developer exclusive long-term rights to the site. City officials said it would take yet another year to further define the project, engage in a public planning process, and finalize the project. They did not expect construction to begin until 2005.

For a time, the entire development effort was threatened by the baseball stadium issue. In September 2002, just a month after the RFP was issued, backers seeking to bring a Major League Baseball team to D.C. as well as some city officials proposed the Washington Convention Center site as one of five possible locations for the construction of a new baseball stadium. It was not until January 30, 2003, that Mayor Williams rejected the convention center as a potential stadium site.

In December 2002, seven development proposals were received in response to the RFP. Proposals for the $1 billion project were received by District of Columbia Civic Development (consisting of Millennium Partners, Jonathan Rose Cos., Gould Property Co., and EastBanc Inc.); East End Redevelopment Associates (consisting of Federal Development LLC, Rockefeller Group Development Corp., Centex, and Summit Properties); Forest City-Jarvis Group (consisting of Forest City Washington and the Jarvis Group); The Georgetown Co.; Hines Interests Limited Partnership and Charles E. Smith Residential; Human Vision Partners (consisting of New Vision Properties LLC and Mesirow Stein Development Services Inc.); The Related Cos., Boston Properties, and MacFarlane Urban Realty Co.; and Dickie S. Carter. The city said it hoped to have its review of the proposals and the public planning process completed by June 2003. Finalists would be selected on the basis of which group had successfully completed large, complex projects in the past and which had good working relationships with local officials in previous projects.

Some new limitations on the site became publicly known as this time as well. First, the National Park Service, which controlled a 100,000-square-foot (9,300 m^{2}) parcel of land near the intersections of New York Avenue NW, I Street NW, and 10th Street NW, required that its land be used to reconnect 10th and I Streets. Second, the size of the site was not the 10.5 acres (4.2 ha) originally reported. Instead, the site was just 9.5 acres (3.8 ha) in size. City officials admitted that the National Park Service controlled a 60,000-square-foot (5,600 m^{2}) parcel along 11th Street NW north of H Street NW. However, D.C. officials said they hoped to convince the agency to allow the site to be developed.

On March 29, 2003, the $600 million Walter E. Washington Convention Center was officially opened.

=== Proposal finalists ===
By April 2003, The Georgetown Co. had withdrawn its proposal and partnered with Hines Interest Limited Partnership/Charles E. Smith Residential. Two groups, East End Redevelopment Associates and Human Vision Partners, had been eliminated from contention by the city. District officials said they would meet with the remaining development teams in May, meet with an external advisory panel in June, and pick a winning proposal in late June. They hoped that construction would begin 18 to 24 months later. The city had still not yet decided what to do with the existing convention center. Various individuals and groups had suggested keeping the facility and renovating it. But Mayor Williams demanded that it be torn down and parking lots be built on the site until the RFP process was finished and construction was ready to begin.

In May 2003, a minor scandal erupted over a partnership which The Related Cos. made with the University of the District of Columbia (UDC). The Related Cos. agreed to allow UDC to establish apprenticeships and educational classes in a number of disciplines (such as construction, cooking, and property management) for UDC students, but only if The Related Cos. won the RFP. Real estate experts, other companies competing for the RFP, and some D.C. officials expressed concern about the partnership because it involved an agency of the District government. But no action was taken against either The Related Cos. or UDC.

==== Narrowing down the finalists ====
On July 3, 2003, District officials narrowed the field of candidates to Hines Interests/Charles E. Smith Residential/The Georgetown Co. and Forest City/Jarvis Co. The two developer groups were chosen as finalists because they were able to finance the project themselves without assistance from the city. D.C. planning officials said they hoped to select one of the two as the project developer by late August. The finalists were asked to participate in a charrette over the next six weeks, to allow outside designers, members of the public, and other interested parties to view, comment on, and make improvements to the submitted designs. Approval of the master plan for the site would not occur until late 2004, city planners said, and zoning and other approvals might take another year or more. Nonetheless, they expressed hope that construction might start in late 2005 or early 2006.

The city's decision was not without controversy. On August 10, 2003, The Related Cos., arguing that the RFP process had been "arbitrary, capricious and improper", demanded that the city start the process over with clearer criteria and new staff to oversee it. The Washington Post, citing unnamed sources close to city officials, said The Related Cos. had been rejected due to their sometimes poor working relationship with local officials in other cities. When the city did not meet its demands, The Related Cos. filed suit in D.C. Superior Court on September 7. A second lawsuit was filed by the company on November 9. On November 20, the District of Columbia Office of the Corporation Counsel filed a motion to dismiss, arguing that The Related Cos. had offered no legal or factual basis for claiming that the selection process was flawed. On December 18, D.C. Superior Court Judge A. Franklin Burress, Jr., rejected the city's motion and scheduled a preliminary court hearing for January 12, 2004. This hearing was rescheduled for March 14. The March 14 hearing was postponed when the city and the developer entered into negotiations to try to resolve their differences without a trial. On March 26, the city and Hines Interest each agreed to pay $1 million to The Related Cos. immediately, with another $3 million to come from revenue generated by the project. City council members criticized the settlement, arguing it left the impression that the RFP process was flawed even though the city had admitted no wrongdoing in the settlement.

==== Decision ====
In late September 2003, Mayor Williams said he would make a decision about the RFP within a few weeks. At this time, The Washington Post reported that the land alone was worth $300 million, the public plaza had become "the focal point" of the development, and that the city was pushing for a "splashy new civic building, designed by one of the world's best-known architects." A month later, D.C. officials were predicting that the project would break ground in 2008. But the final design of the development was still uncertain, as the Federal City Council renewed its push for a national music museum at the site. There was also an increase in political maneuvering regarding the project. As of October 2003, backers of the Forest City bid included several prominent supporters of Mayor Williams, while advocates of the Hines-Smith Residential bid included wealthy, politically active friends of local D.C. developer Charles E. Smith.

On November 6, 2003, Mayor Williams announced that the project had been awarded to the Hines Interests/Archstone/The Georgetown Co. group. The Hines group was chosen because of its track record, its proposal, and because it also had a history of working with minority-owned businesses. The group's financial package was also superior. The city had been willing to use up to $20 million annually in tax revenues generated by the project to help finance construction. But the Hines-led group was able to secure financing without city assistance, a much more favorable financial deal for the District of Columbia. (In a separate report, however, The Bond Buyer reported that it was yet unclear whether the project would require city financial backing, and that individual projects within the development might use city-issued tax-exempt bonds for funding.) The development group also said it would make a cash payment to the city immediately upon approval of the deal and give the city a portion of the profits from the project, a combined income which city officials said was worth $250 million. The winning proposal included 350,000 square feet (33,000 m^{2}) of ground level retail space; 600 apartments and 275 condominiums; 50,000 square feet (4,600 m^{2}) of office space; a 200 to 300 room boutique hotel; and a 155,000-square-foot (14,400 m^{2}) "cultural facility" (whose use was not yet determined) that included a 3,000-seat theater. (At least one report gave the size of the cultural facility as just 70,000 square feet (6,500 m^{2}).) Each of the buildings in the project was 11 stories high, and construction was anticipated to begin in late 2005. Hines executives said construction of the project would indirectly contribute $350 million to the local economy, and when complete the development would generate $15 to $20 million a year in property tax revenues for the city.

Two other firms, the Bundy Development Corp. and the Neighborhood Development Co., had also joined the Hines-Archstone group as co-developers. Hines said it had chosen Foster and Partners, a British firm, as the chief architect for the project.

The price of the land had yet to be negotiated, and D.C. Council approval of the overall agreement was still needed. However, Mayor Williams proposed spending $13 million to demolish the Washington Convention Center and construct temporary parking lots on the site until construction began. Government officials also estimated that a year's worth of planning still had to be done, and that zoning approvals could take one or more years after that.

=== Project delays ===
==== 2003–04 ====
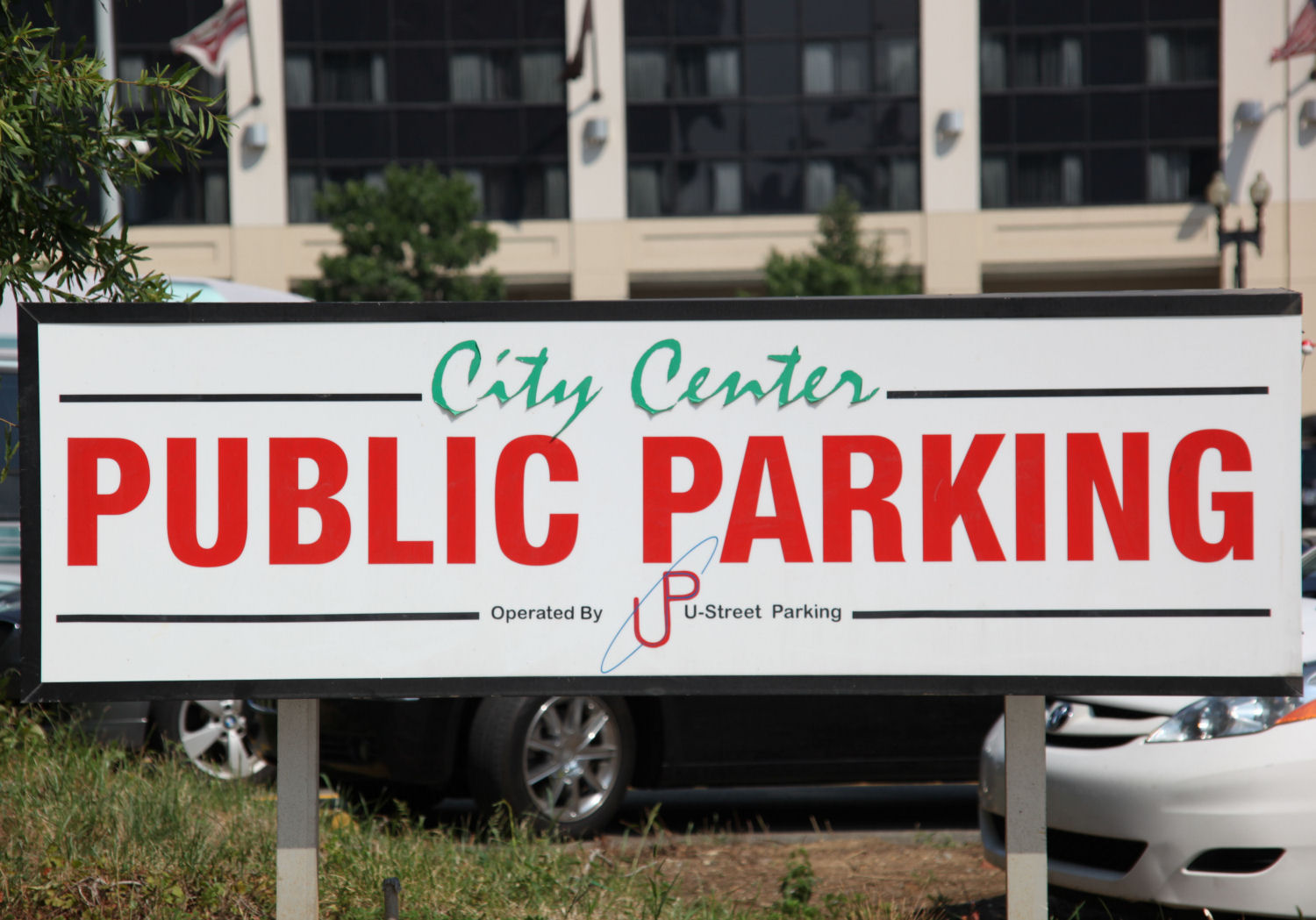
Temporary parking lots were built on the site of the Washington Convention Center after its 2004 implosion.

On December 20, 2003, Williams submitted legislation to the D.C. City Council proposing to raze the Washington Convention Center and construct city-owned parking lots on the site temporarily. Willams said the facility cost $600,000 a year to maintain and was a potential legal liability. The cost of demolition and parking lot construction was set at $16 million, but the cost could be offset by parking fees. Three months later, in March 2004, the city and the Hines group began negotiating the terms of the redevelopment agreement. Negotiations were expected to conclude in April, with construction now estimated to begin in late in 2007 or early in 2008.

In April 2004, however, the D.C. City Council proposed scrapping the redevelopment deal. Local architect Ted Mariani had proposed building a 1,500-room hotel and convention exhibit halls (linked underground to the new convention center) on the site of the old convention center, and convinced several members of the City Council that this would be a better use of the land. The Williams administration strongly opposed this plan. Over the next month, members of the Williams administration and City Council staff began meeting to Mariani's proposal. Joe Sternlieb, head of the Downtown D.C. Business Improvement District; James A. Jemison, mayoral planning aide; and city development consultant Ron Kaplan met three times a week for two to three hours each day with council staff to convince them that the Mariani proposal was inappropriate. Mayoral staff said they could agree to a hotel and some meeting space underground, so long as the council approved the development deal by late June. But Council Chair Linda W. Cropp and Council Member Jack Evans (in whose ward the site was located) both favored the Mariani plan. Cropp said she voted to approve construction of the new convention center only because she had been led to believe that the old convention center would continue to exist and provide exhibit space for the city. On July 15, 2004, the two sides reached an agreement to proceed with the existing Williams-backed plan, so long as it included at least 1,200 housing units and a new city main public library—but not convention exhibit halls, a major hotel, or a music museum. The agreement permitted the construction of private offices or a boutique hotel atop the library building. It also allowed the Hines-led development group to lease the site for 99 years in return for a fixed multimillion-dollar annual rent payment as well as 25 percent of the project's profits. However, some City Council members, the Washington Convention and Sports Authority, and the Federal City Council opposed to the agreement. Going a step further, the Washington Convention and Sports Authority (WCSA) commissioned a study of the old convention center site, which it said would be ready in August 2004.

The disagreement dragged on into late 2004. The WCSA consultant's report was complete in October 2004. The authority was due to vote on accepting its consultant's report on October 13, but delayed the vote after Mayor Williams asked for more time to negotiate a solution. The next day, Cropp, supported by the city's hospitality industry, suggested that the old convention center site be used for a $450 million, 1,500-room "convention headquarters hotel" instead of the site (bounded by L Street NW, 9th Street NW, and Massachusetts Avenue NW) favored by the Williams administration. Greg Fazakerley, a local developer and former president of the D.C. Building Industry Association, stepped in at the end of October to assist the two sides in coming to an agreement. The WCSA board delayed a November 4 vote until December. However, it did release its consultant's report, which did not specify a site for construction of the headquarters hotel but did identify six sites to be occupied by hotels of various size as well as financing options for them. On December 3, the WCSA board voted in favor of the Williams site, but said it would continue to study placing a hotel on a triangular plot of land at 901 New York Avenue NW. WCSA said its third option would be to build the hotel on the northeast corner of the old Washington Convention Center site. Although Cropp was unhappy with the WCSA board's action, Williams said the city would move forward on negotiations with the Hines group. William B. Alsup III, head of Washington operations for Hines Interests, said the company could put aside 70,000 square feet (6,500 m^{2}) of the site to build a hotel, even though this would mean sacrificing 428 housing units. Although no formal resolution to the dispute had occurred, Hines Interests released new details in February 2005 about what it envisioned building: Just 772 units of condos and apartments, 275,000 square feet (25,500 m^{2}) of ground-level retail space, now 300,000 square feet (28,000 m^{2}) of office space, and a 50,000-square-foot (4,600 m^{2}) public library. With the Federal City Council still pushing for a music museum, the developers said 1.75 acres (0.71 ha) of land would remain unbuilt until the city decided what would occupy that space. By this time, construction was scheduled to begin in 2008 and end in 2010. In early March 2005, in an attempt to resolve the disagreement, Mayor Williams offered to pay for construction of the new city main library out of the city's revenues from the project, and use the remaining revenue to reinvigorate the city library system as a whole. Williams asked that the Council resolve the dispute over the headquarters hotel quickly, and warned that further delay imperiled the 7,500 temporary construction jobs and more than 5,000 permanent jobs the project could create.

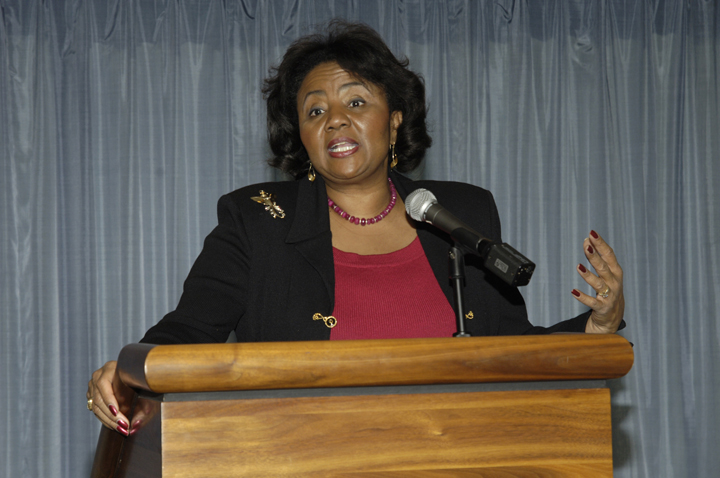
D.C. City Council Chair Linda W. Cropp fought a year-long losing battle to put a large hotel on the site, then successfully retained council authority over a portion of the development.

The old Washington Convention Center was imploded on December 18, 2004. Concrete from the site was recycled and used as a stabilizing layer in the new temporary parking lots later built on the site. The city built a beautified parking lot on the space. Colored glass was embedded in sidewalks criss-crossing the lot; trees and shrubs were planted around the lots; purple-colored street lamps provided nighttime lighting; a 60-foot (18 m) wide path of synthetic green carpet, stretched the north–south across the lot, connected the two ends of 10th Street NW; and on either side of the carpet were 12 pairs of abstract art by local artists mounted on 10-foot (3.0 m) high poles.

==== 2005 ====
Resolution to the dispute came in June 2005, after almost a year's delay. The D.C. City Council Economic Development Committee held a hearing on the issue on April 18, 2005. The council expected to hold a final vote approving the original agreement between the city and the Hines-led group in May. However, the additional delay now meant that construction would not begin until 2009 and not end until 2011. But Cropp convinced a majority of the council to put off the scheduled May 4 vote. She argued that the agreement gave the mayor complete authority over whether to build a hotel on the old convention center site, authority the council should not grant. Williams submitted a revised agreement on May 24. Another vote was scheduled for June 2005. Finally, on June 6, 2005, the D.C. City Council unanimously voted to approve the deal between the city and the Hines-led developers' group. The agreement said that 120,000 square feet (11,000 m^{2}) of land on the northeast corner of the old convention center site would be set aside, pending council resolution of what to do with the property. Although the plan still included a public park or other space (to be managed by the property manager, not the city), a music museum had been explicitly ruled out by the council in favor of revenue-generating activities.

Details of the plan remained unclear. The Associated Press reported that there would now be 1,372 housing units on the site, and that office, retail, and parking space would total 550,000 square feet (51,000 m^{2}). But the finance industry publication The Bond Buyer said there would be only 772 housing units, and office and retail space alone would total more than 575,000 square feet (53,400 m^{2}) (275,000 square feet (25,500 m^{2}) of retail space and 300,000 square feet (28,000 m^{2}) of office space). The publication also said that 2,000 parking spaces were included in the project, and that at least 30 percent of the retail space must be leased to stand-alone rather than chain stores. Construction would begin in 2008, the Associated Press said. The city would get a 99-year lease, the Associated Press and The Bond Buyer reported, but this would generate only about $2 million a year in profit. Another $10 million a year would be generated in income and property taxes.

=== Finalizing the master plan ===
==== Final stage of planning ====
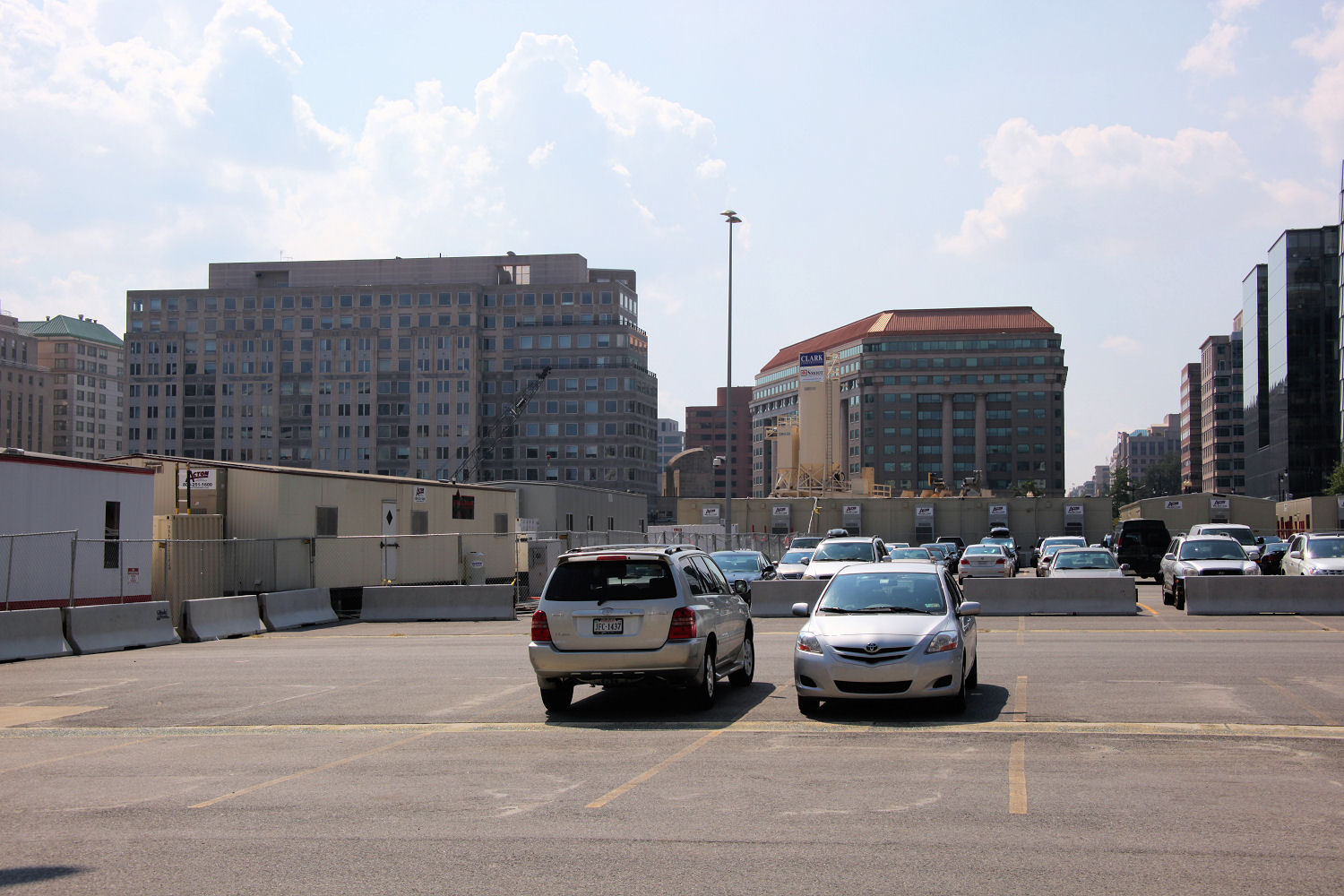
The northeast corner of the old convention center site was transferred to developer Kingdon Gould III in November 2007.

Although the city had finally approved the awarding of the project, most of the details had yet to be decided. City officials said in June 2005 that it would take six to nine months to finalize the master plan. In November 2005, the Office of the Deputy Mayor for Planning and Economic Development and the Hines-led group held its first meeting to receive public input.

The planning process took longer than anticipated because it was complicated by additional real estate deals. On January 26, 2005, Kingdon Gould III (a local developer) swapped a 1.5 acres (0.61 ha) lot on the southeast corner of 9th Street NW and Massachusetts Avenue NW for a similar-sized lot at the site of the old convention center. This land swap was essential to constructing the new convention center "headquarters hotel." The site preferred by Mayor Williams and recommended by his task force was not large enough for the planned hotel, and not contiguous. Gould's lot would create a unified site large enough for the headquarters hotel. The deal began taking shape in August 2005, after the D.C. City Council had approved the awarding of the RFP. The WSCA put a $900,000 down payment on the lot (which included the historic former headquarters of the United Association of Journeymen and Apprentices of the Plumbing and Pipe Fitting Industry and an adjacent small piece of land). The city and Gould engaged in lengthy negotiations over the price of Gould's land, and whether a payment or land swap would be needed. A land swap was agreed to, and the city was able to move ahead with plans to build the Washington Marriott Marquis (the 1,430-room "headquarters hotel" long-desired by the city). The Gould land swap deal removed from northeasternmost lot on the old convention center site from the control of the Hines-led group, although it remained subject to the restrictions of the master plan. The land swap still required city council approval.

The land swap negotiations had held up resolution of the master plan details, but now Hines Interests officials said they would submit the draft final master plan to the city in the spring of 2005. That $1 billion plan now called for 275,000 square feet (25,500 m^{2}) of retail space, 400,000 square feet (37,000 m^{2}) of office space (up from 300,000 square feet (28,000 m^{2}) in June 2004), 772 apartments and condominiums, and 1,200 parking spaces (down from 2,000 in June 2004). Further changes were made to the development as the master planning process continued. By late May 2006, The Washington Post architecture critic Benjamin Forgey said, the large public plaza had largely disappeared from the plans. A month later, The Washington Post described the unnamed project (now scheduled for completion in 2011) as having 772 condo units, 275,000 square feet (25,500 m^{2}) of retail space (unchanged from January 2006), 300,000 square feet (28,000 m^{2}) of office space (down from 100,000 square feet (9,300 m^{2}) since January 2006), 1,900 parking spaces (up from 1,200 in January 2006), an outdoor ice skating rink, and a $187 million library. A briefing for architectural and engineering firms seeking subcontract work from the developers was held in September 2006.

==== Approval ====
City officials approved the final master plan on November 20, 2006. The project included 686 housing units (down from 772 in June 2006), 280,000 square feet (26,000 m^{2}) of retail space (up from 275,000 square feet (25,500 m^{2}) in June 2006), 415,000 square feet (38,600 m^{2}) of office space (up from 300,000 square feet (28,000 m^{2}) in June 2006), 1,700 underground parking spaces (down from 1,900 in June 2006), and 110,000 square feet (10,000 m^{2}) of land for a public library. Twenty percent of the condominiums would be priced for low-income people. The public park had not disappeared (as previously reported), but just 21,780 square feet (2,023 m^{2}) were set aside for what was now called "Central Plaza". Tenth Street NW was reopened, a narrowed I Street NW was reopened between 9th and 10th Streets NW, and 30 percent of the retail space was set aside for non-chain stores. Two condominium buildings occupied the corner of 9th and H Streets NW, while two larger apartment buildings occupied the corner of 10th and H Streets NW. A north–south running open-air plaza occupied the space between them. Two office buildings occupied the south end of the block between 10th and 11th Streets NW, while an open-air public park with fountain was on the north end. A 24-foot (7.3 m) wide, covered "pedestrian street" ran east–west between the buildings on both blocks. Foster and Partners oversaw the design of the development, while the local firm of Shalom Baranes Associates was the lead architect. The Washington Business Journal and The Washington Times reported the project's total cost as $650 million, but The Washington Post pegged it at $630 million. City officials estimated that the development would create more than 7,500 temporary construction jobs and 5,200 permanent jobs, and bring in $30 million annually in income, sales, and property tax revenues. Construction was set to begin in late 2008 and conclude by mid-2011. The city had yet to decide what to do with its remaining 110,000 square feet (10,000 m^{2}) parcel, which occupied the west end of the triangular block bordering New York Avenue NW between 9th and 10th Streets NW, but city officials were still pushing for a public library on the spot.

The 99-year lease the city signed with Hines-Archstone in 2006 expressed the intent of both parties to seek the following kind and number of retailers for the project: five restaurants, 10 food markets (general and/or speciality), and 14 cafés.

===== Preliminary design =====
In April 2007, the Hines-led development group submitted its preliminary design schematics to the city for approval. The submission focused on the redevelopment of the park on the northwestern corner of the site, the reopening of 10th and I Streets NW, and the six parcels of land for the office buildings and residential housing. All buildings were designed to meet existing zoning regulations. Approval of the schematics and signing of the lease for the land were anticipated to occur in May 2007, so that construction could begin that fall. The schematics showed that 464 residential units would be apartments, and 222 units would be condominiums. Each building was 11 or 12 stories tall, and sheathed in glass and steel.

Further details about the preliminary design emerged two weeks later. The Washington Post reported that the northwestern park was now slightly larger at 29,000 square feet (2,700 m^{2}), office space had soared to 465,000 square feet (43,200 m^{2}) (up from 415,000 square feet (38,600 m^{2}) in November 2006), and only 1,640 underground parking spaces were planned (down from 1,700 in November 2006). The number of housing units had fallen to 665 from 686 in November 2006, which included 211 condos ranging in price from $700,000 to $1.4 million. Retail space had also shrunk, to 250,000 square feet (23,000 m^{2}) (from 280,000 square feet (26,000 m^{2}) in November 2006). Four of the buildings had retail on three stories, while the other two had retail on just two. Gould's plans for the northeast corner of the site were still unsettled, but Hines and Archstone executives said it was well-suited for office space and a boutique hotel.

===== Facade =====
The look of the new buildings also was made public at this time. Foster and Partners designed both office and both condominium buildings, while Shalom Baranes designed the apartment buildings. All the buildings were "streamlined in glass and metal". The office buildings were clad in a double layer of glass and metal designed to move to reflect sunlight. The condo buildings had glass curtain walls, and balconies extended uninterrupted across the facade (although metal grilles separated each unit's balcony from the next to create some privacy). Vertical slabs of precast concrete extended vertically up the facade to help break up the monotonous glass wall. The apartment buildings (by lead architect Robert M. Sponseller) also featured glass curtain walls, but the balconies (which did not extend across the facade) were clad in terra cotta and the corners of the buildings were covered in glazed tile in a rhythmic patterns reminiscent of 22 West (a luxury condominium located at 22nd and M Streets NW and completed in 2008). Setbacks were used on the upper floors along the pedestrian interior spaces. The "pedestrian street" (nicknamed "9 1/2 Street" by the architects) was to be paved in granite, with each retail front jutting into the street at different depths and adorned with varying signage. The goal was to mimic a street which had been built at different times and in different architectural styles, without completely losing a uniform architectural style that would unify the storefronts visually. The narrowness of the pedestrian area was intended to create a more human-scale urban experience similar to that of New York City. The interior plaza between the condominiums and apartment buildings was shown with a fountain in the center.

The Washington Post reported that public reaction to Shalom Baranes' design of the structures tended to be negative. Local Advisory Neighborhood Commission member Alexander Padro told the press, "It's got nothing to it. It's a lost opportunity. It's a shock to see them come up with a bunch of glass boxes instead of an impressive architectural statement." Padro was strongly critical of the open plazas, pointing out that similar spaces in the city did not function as intended but were "skateboard havens and homeless encampments." Deborah Dietsch, architectural critic for The Washington Times, described the condominiums as "disappointing", oppressive, out of place, and recalling "1960s-era apartment blocks". She thought the apartment building designs were "fresher". Dietsch also worried that public spaces, designed by the landscape architecture firm of Gustafson Guthrie Nichol, would be too flat, too hard, and "more severe than serene." But The Washington Post architectural critic Philip Kennicott praised "9 1/2 Street," calling it "the most distinctive feature" of the redevelopment plan.

==== The site ====
On November 1, 2007, the land swap deal with developer Gould (first signed in January 2005) was finally approved. Although the City Council had signed off on the deal in June 2005, the city took another 25 months to change local zoning regulations so that Gould was exempted from building housing on his new site (as required by the agreement). Gould said he still had not decided what should be built there. The approval meant Gould could not begin considering what project to place on his land.

The city, too, remained undecided about what to do with its 53,700-square-foot (4,990 m^{2}) site adjacent to Gould's parcel. City officials said that if they decided to not build anything on the parcel, the Hines-led development group had the right to negotiate for a long-term lease for its use. The developers were not so undecided. They were negotiating to purchase outright 60,000 square feet (5,600 m^{2}) of land at the northwest corner of H and 9th Streets NW, and reported that specialty retail stores and supermarkets had already expressed interest in leasing the ground-floor retail there. The delays in deciding the fate of both parcels of land meant that the project was now not due for completion until January 2012.

On December 17, 2007, D.C. Mayor Adrian Fenty (who was elected in November 2006 and took office in January 2007), and the Hines-led development group signed a final $850 million agreement giving Hines-Archstone final control over the old convention center site. Hines-Archstone leased the land beneath the office and apartment buildings for $500,000 a year for 99 years, but purchased the land beneath the condominiums. Retail space in the final agreement was set at 250,000 square feet (23,000 m^{2}) and office space at 465,000 square feet (43,200 m^{2}) (both unchanged from April 2007), although now housing units numbered 760 (up from 665 in April). The lease agreement required that 30 percent of the retail space be set aside for businesses with fewer than six locations nationwide. The developers committed to spending about $55 million to make 134 (17.6 percent) of the housing units affordable to people with low incomes, $48 million to make improvements to infrastructure (water, sewer, electricity, streets), $14 million to provide entertainment in the development's public spaces, and $55 million for miscellaneous improvements. The city would receive about $28.5 million annually in rent, as well as 25 percent of all profits above certain specified levels. The city remained undecided about what to do with its 53,700-square-foot (4,990 m^{2}) parcel, while Hines-Archstone said they would build a big-box store on the parcel if it became available. City officials said they hoped to solicit proposals for their parcel in spring 2008. Hines-Archstone said construction would begin on the apartment, condominium, and office buildings in January 2009, with the first buildings ready for occupancy in 2011. The project still had no official name, but both Fenty and Hines-Archstone officials used the term "city center".

In late December 2007, The Washington Times reported that construction on the project would begin in 2009 and end in 2011. On December 24, the Washington Business Journal said that plans to build a new central library on the 53,700-square-foot (4,990 m^{2}) city-owned parcel on the development's north side "had died." The paper reported that the city was now likely to sell the parcel to Hines-Archstone, and that a decision would be made in the first three months of 2008.

With the master plan and architectural design details nearly complete, the National Capital Planning Commission (NCPC) began reviewing the development. The NCPC has planning authority over federally owned land in the metropolitan D.C. region, and provides advice to the District of Columbia in land use decisions. The NCPC was briefed on the convention center development project on March 6, 2008, and approved final site plans for the northwest park and reopening of 10th and I Streets NW on April 3. The commission expressed its concern with "9 1/2 Street," concluding it went against the city's existing pattern of wide streets.

==== Naming ====
On May 11, 2008, the Washington Business Journal said the developers had finally settled on CityCenterDC as the project's name. The newspaper also said that the District of Columbia and Hines-Archstone had agreed to a 99-year lease of the city's parcel on the site's northern edge for the construction of a 400-room luxury hotel and 100,000 square feet (9,300 m^{2}) of retail space. The cost of the building would be $150 million, and the retail space would occupy the first and second floors of the hotel (with the possibility of an underground retail level as well). The price of the lease was not set, as this depended on what retailers agreed to occupy the structure. The development group said it was looking for a "large format retailer" such as Nordstrom or Bloomingdale's, and hoped to announce the retail space occupant within six months. Hines-Archstone said they now hoped to now break ground in the second quarter of 2009, with a completion date of 2011.

==== Temporary tennis stadium ====
Before construction began at the site, a temporary stadium was erected to serve as the home court for the Washington Kastles of World TeamTennis for the 2008 through 2010 seasons. The stadium was called Kastles Stadium at CityCenterDC. The Kastles, an expansion team in 2008, hosted and won the 2009 league championship on the site.

== Financing ==
As of May 2008, Hines-Archstone had not sought financing for its projects, even though credit markets were tightening due to the late-2000s recession. Hines-Archstone began seeking financing in September, but funds were proving difficult to obtain. Archstone was partially owned by Lehman Brothers, which declared bankruptcy on September 15, 2008. Archstone said the investment lender's bankruptcy would not impact CityCenterDC, and that it had access to sources of financing other than Lehman Brothers. However, it admitted that the ongoing recession was making it difficult to find that money. By early December, Hines-Archstone had still not obtained the $500 million in financing it needed, and decided to postpone any further efforts until 2009.

Groundbreaking, previously set for January 2009, was put off until July 2009 and possibly December 2009. By March 2009, financing had still not been put in place. Hines-Archstone officials said they would have to talk to twice as many investors as usual before financing could be found. The lack of financing began to worry contractors. Firms such as the structural engineering company Thornton Tomasetti, consulting engineering firm TOLK, Inc., and Shalom Baranes Associates, among others, said they would be forced to lay off employees if the project did not start soon.

Financing finally emerged in fall 2010. On October 20, D.C. Council member Jack Evans announced that officials with Hines Interests and the Jarvis Company had told him that they had obtained financing but did not specify the source. Hines Interests declined to identify the investor at that time, while D.C. officials said it was a "foreign entity" which would finance the entire $750 million to $950 million cost alone. Hines-Archstone officials said that they were also going to move ahead even though they did not yet have major tenants signed up for space in the buildings. Although the law firm of Skadden, Arps, Slate, Meagher & Flom had signed a letter of intent to occupy space in the office buildings back in March 2002, the firm pulled out in July 2010.

== Construction ==
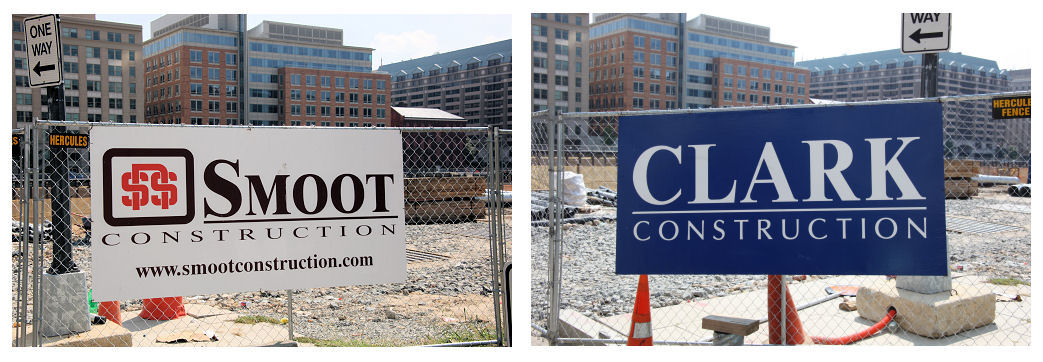
Clark Construction and the Sherman R. Smoot Co. formed a joint venture, Clark/Smoot, to provide construction services to the massive CityCenterDC project.

=== Groundbreaking ===
On October 21, 2010, Hines-Archstone said it would break ground on April 4, 2011. Instead of constructing buildings one at a time, the Hines-led group said that the apartment, condominium, and office buildings would be built at the same time. The northern parcel (containing the large-format retailer and 400-room hotel) would be built later. Clark Construction Group and the Sherman R. Smoot Co., large construction companies located in D.C., formed a joint venture named Clark/Smoot to provide construction services to the development. Clark/Smoot began soliciting bids for subcontractors on October 10, 2010, and said they would close this process by February or March 2011. Financing and development needs were drawing new participants in the project as well. The Washington Business Journal said that Triden Development Group and The Mayhood Co. had both become partners in the development. The cost of the project was now pegged at $950 million.

Ground on the project was formally broken on April 4 (although workers had actually broken ground 10 days earlier). D.C. officials told the press that the unidentified investor in the project was the Qatari Diar Real Estate Investment Company, a company controlled by the Qatar Investment Authority, the government of Qatar's sovereign wealth fund. Barwa Bank, a Qatari bank, assisted in the financing. The total invested was $620 million, and made Qatari Diar the development's principal owner. It was Qatari Diar's first investment in the United States, and officials of the organization said they considered the deal the most important in their $60 billion portfolio. Since the CityCenterDC investment, the Qatar Investment Authority recently stated its intentions to invest $10 billion in U.S. infrastructure projects, in addition to previous announcements that it would invest $35 billion between 2016 and 2021. Ali Bin Fahad Al-Hajri, the Qatari ambassador to the United States, and Joseph LeBaron, the United States Ambassador to Qatar, were present for the groundbreaking. Hines-Archstone officials said American firms were too reluctant to invest in the project during the recession, which forced the company to look globally for a financier. Newly elected D.C. Mayor Vincent C. Gray said the project would create an estimated 1,700 temporary construction jobs and 3,700 permanent jobs, while bringing in $29.8 million annually in taxes and generating $9.4 million in annual sales taxes. Construction on the main phase of the development would conclude in 2014, local press reported, while construction of the retail and hotel building on the northern parcel would not be complete until 2015. More than 100 subcontractors had been hired.

Aspects of the development again were revised again at the time of the groundbreaking. Office space had risen to 515,000 square feet (47,800 m^{2}) (from 465,000 square feet (43,200 m^{2}) in December 2007), retail space had dropped to 185,000 square feet (17,200 m^{2}) (from 250,000 square feet (23,000 m^{2}) in December 2007), and the number of housing units had fallen to 674 (from 760 in December 2007). This included 216 condominiums (about 32 percent of all housing units, the same as the last time a mix of units was reported in April 2007). Hines-Archstone officials said the cost of a 1,000-square-foot (93 m^{2}) condominium would be $750,000 to $900,000, with marketing of these units to begin in April 2012. Ninety-two of the 459 apartment units were priced for low-income residents, an increase in the percentage of low-income units since it was last reported in 2006. Although the number of parking spaces was not reported, the developers said there would be four underground parking levels. Hines-Archstone said it would seek LEED for Neighborhood Development certification.

=== Problems arise ===
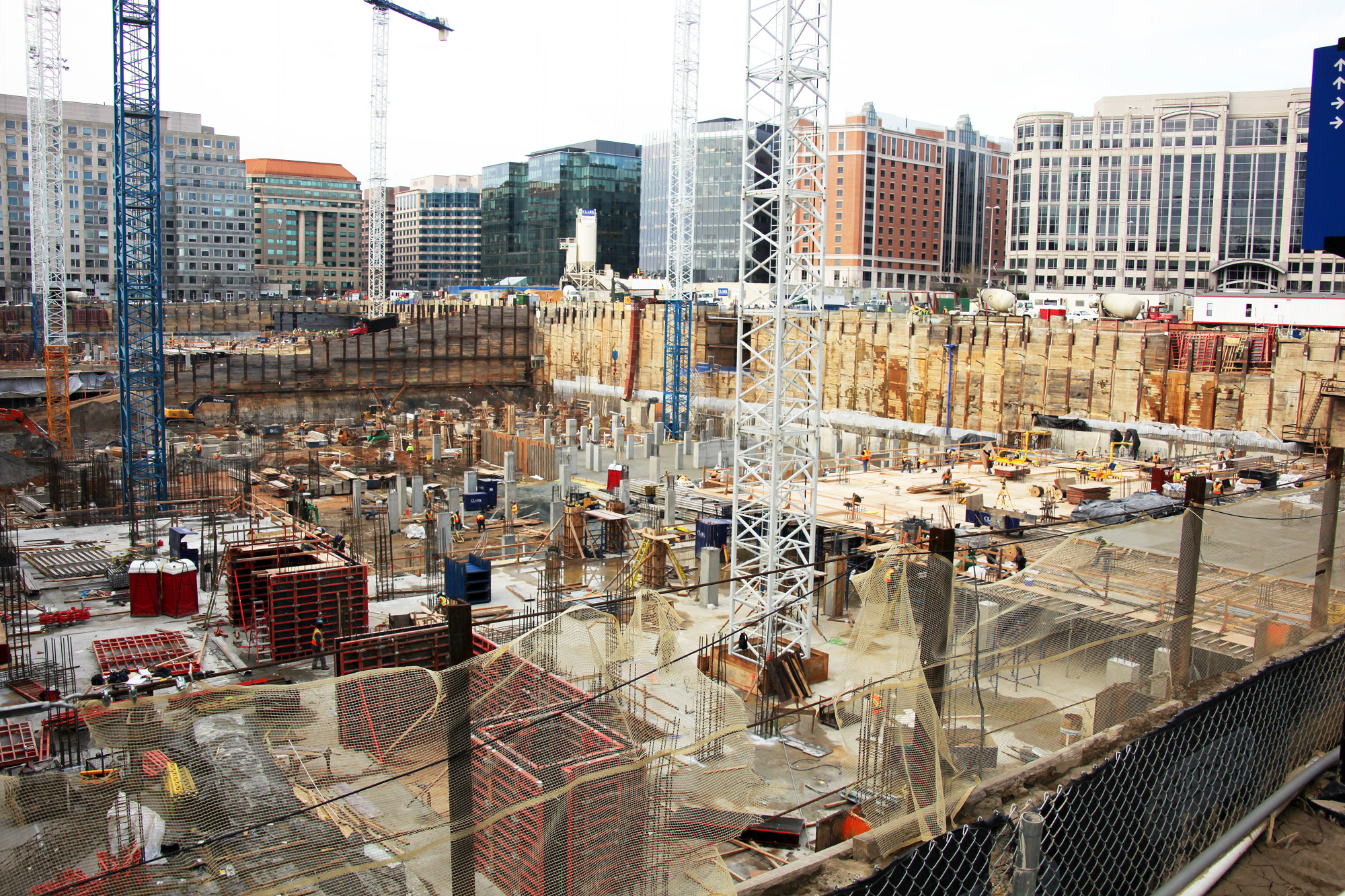
Site under construction (August 2011)

On June 21, 2011, The New York Times reported that the project would be largely complete by late 2013. The developers were pursuing high-end retailers like Apple Inc. to lease space in the development. They were not, however, willing to allow banks to lease space, because they had low foot traffic and were not open at night, although other reports contend this decision was made primarily to satisfy Qatari Diar's requirement of adherence to Sharia, or Islamic law.

Some individuals and media sources expressed concern over the Qatari involvement. Because Qatari Diar was involved, the project was required to adhere to the restrictions of Sharia, or Islamic law. This included a ban on collecting interest. Not only did Qatari Diar provide cash (not interest-bearing loans) for the project, banks were not initially permitted as tenants. There were concerns that the sale of alcohol, pork, or tobacco as well as businesses such as gambling, hotels, movie theaters, and nude entertainment would also be prohibited. The Hines-Archstone group said it had never intended to allow banks, gambling, or liquor stores, and although it was seeking a wine bar (or similar business) as a tenant the Qataris said their interpretation of Sharia permitted such an establishment. The Qataris also said restaurants would be able to serve liquor and pork, because the sale of such items was not a restaurant's primary business. Automated teller machines would also be permitted, and the agreement between Hines-Archstone and Qatari Diar did not bar a bank as a tenant in the future. Concern over the Qatari role in CityCenterDC was expressed by the conservative think tank Center for Security Policy and by Pamela Geller, author of the popular conservative blog Atlas Shrugs, both of whom believed that Islamic law was being imposed on Americans without their consent. Conservative concern over the project was also reported in the Washington City Paper.

In June 2011, a major disagreement over federal prevailing-wage law broke out regarding the project. The dispute involved a petition filed in 2009 with the United States Department of Labor (DOL) by the Mid-Atlantic Regional Council of Carpenters, a regional union belonging to the United Brotherhood of Carpenters and Joiners of America. The union claimed that because the city agreed to increase taxes to support CityCenterDC and a public park and city-subsidized affordable housing is included in the development, the project triggered the provisions of the federal Davis–Bacon Act—which requires that prevailing wages be paid on public works projects. The Wage and Hour Division rejected the petition in August 2010, but the union appealed and won a ruling in June 2011 applying prevailing wages to the project. The Wage and Hour Division ruling did not require the project to hire union workers, but would have the effect of making unionized contractors more competitive. The city and Hines/Archstone appealed to a DOL review board have the ruling overturned, arguing that it would increase costs by $20 million and compromise or bring to a halt major city-funded building projects at the Southwest Waterfront, the campus of St. Elizabeths Hospital, and the former Walter Reed Army Medical Center campus. The Wage and Hour Division said the city would be responsible for the wage increase, while the city said Hines/Archstone would need to pay for it. Local labor unions and the AFL–CIO opposed the city's decision to appeal (which had Mayor Gray's personal approval). The Washington Post editorialized strongly against DOL's June 2011 decision.

=== Phase I completion and opening ===
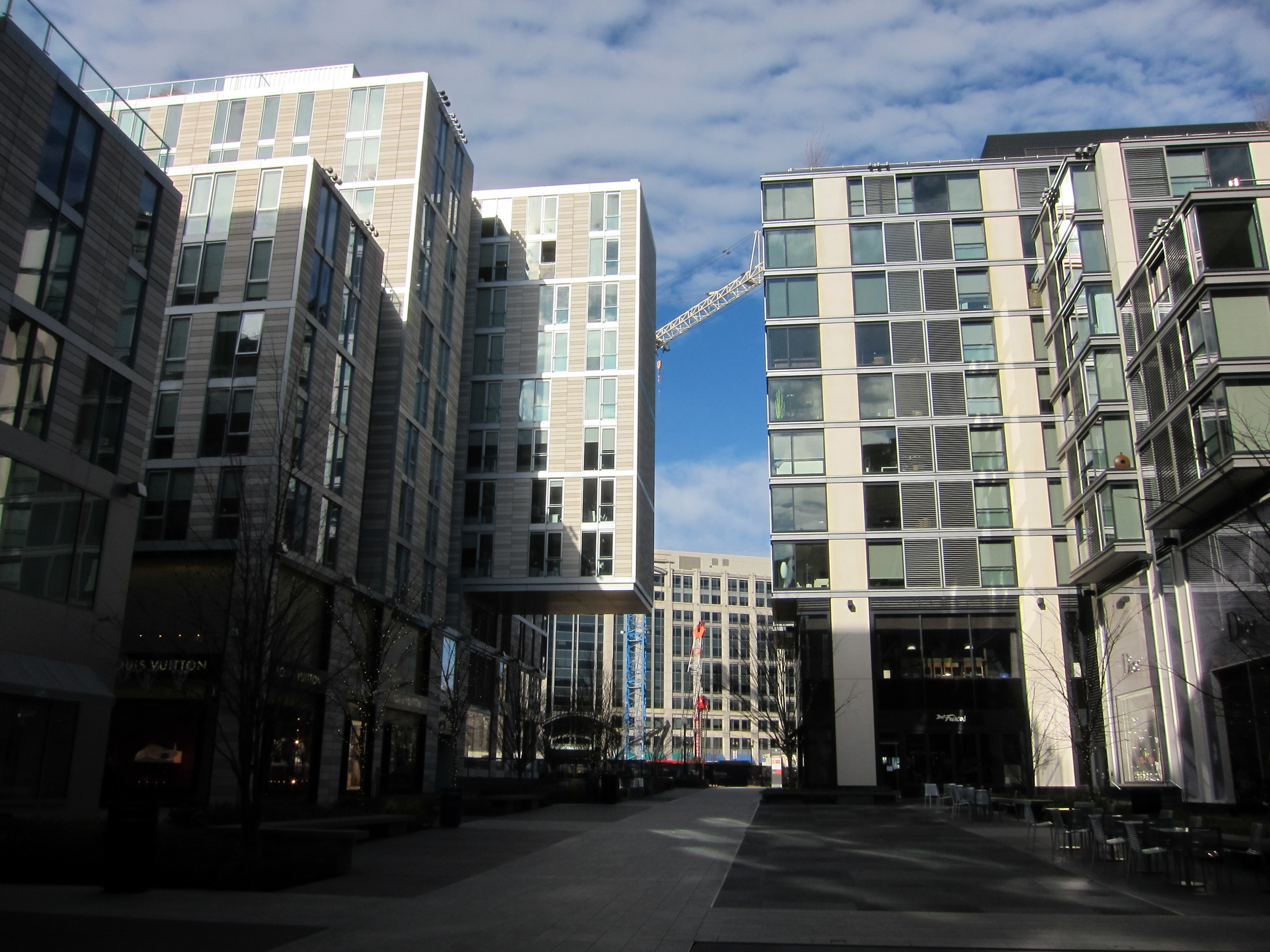
CityCenterDC Plaza with apartment building on the left and condominiums on the right.

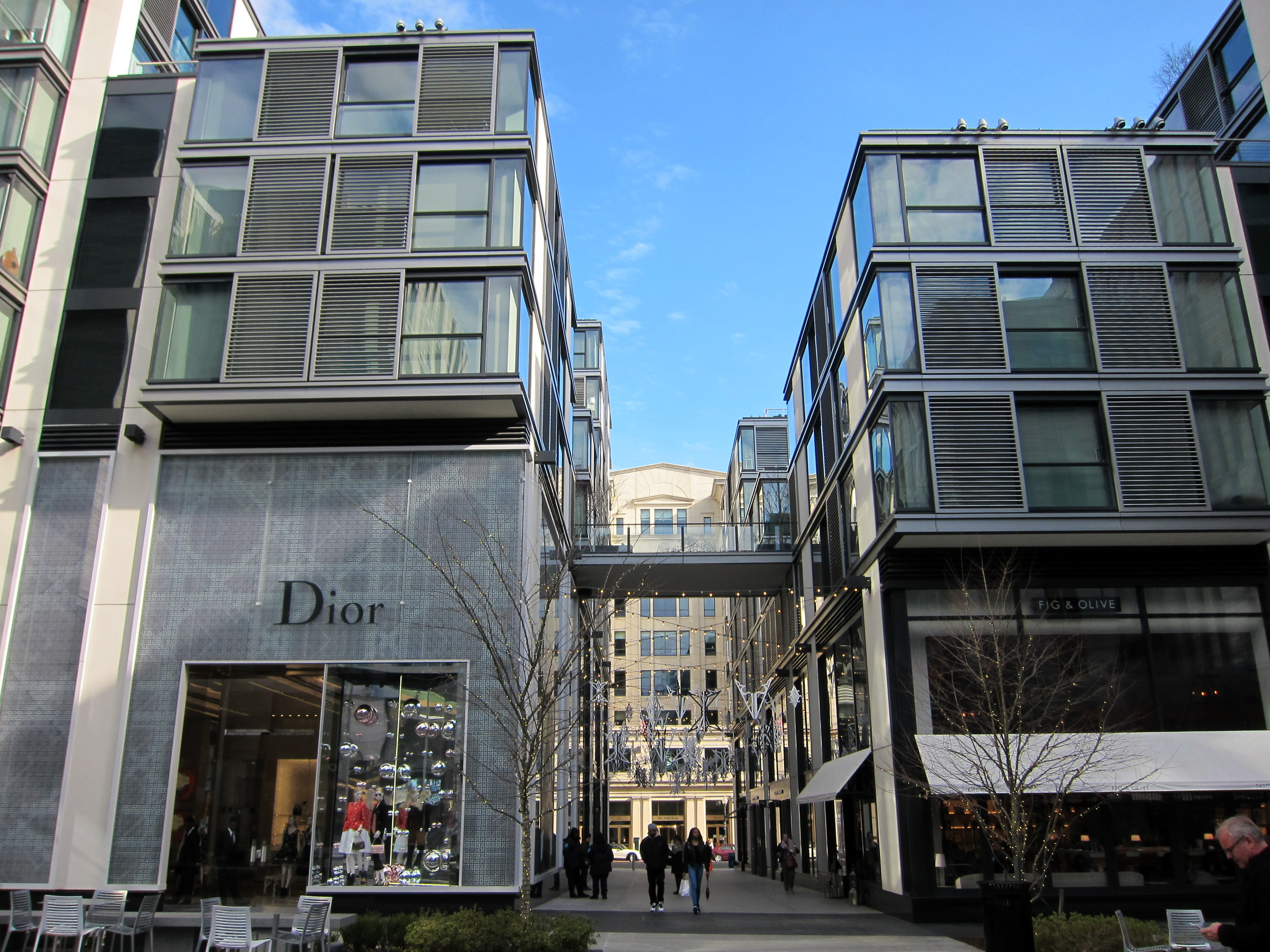
A Dior storefront along Palmer Alley.

By late 2013, the construction of the first buildings in Phase I was complete, with tenants moving in to their apartments in December. In spring 2014, retail stores began opening. An electronic art installation was unveiled at a ceremony with Mayor Vincent C. Gray in June 2014. The office buildings opened later that year, with the largest tenant moving in December 2014. By summer 2015, most of the development was completed and the restaurant and retail tenants were open for business.

=== Phase II ===
In February 2013, Hilton Worldwide said it was in talks with CityCenterDC developers to open a 370-room Conrad Hotel at 925 New York Avenue, NW as the second phase of the six-building complex. In early summer of 2014, an agreement was finalized for the construction of a Conrad Hotel. Construction on the luxury hotel broke ground in mid-2016, which marks the seventh total building developed in the Hines-Qatari partnership. Qatari Diar Americas’ chief executive officer Fabien Toscano stated that this is a significant milestone for future generations to come, as it is "a destination designed to enhance the experience of everyone who stays and visits, and to inspire the way they choose to work, live and play".

=== The Gould space ===
In October 2012, Kingston Gould III announced that he would construct an office tower on the empty northeast lot adjacent to CityCenterDC. 900 New York Avenue NW, proposed to face New York Avenue NW and 9th Street NW, would have 620,000 square feet (58,000 m^{2}) of office space and 13 stories. Gould said Kendall/Heaton Associates was the lead architectural firm, with design input from the firm of Pickard Chilton. The Atelier Ten firm would assist in making the building sustainable, and the Seattle-based landscape architectural firm of Gustafson Guthrie Nichol would handle interior and exterior landscaping. The building would be "Class A" office space, offering high-end amenities, a top-floor room providing views of the city, And a 13-story garden atrium. The facade would be glass, and there would be extensive interior and exterior landscaping. Two months later, Gould said financing would be provided by Oxford Properties Group (a subsidiary of the giant pension fund OMERS Worldwide), and was likely to break ground in 2013.

== Concern over Qatari Diar ownership ==
=== Sharia law allegations ===
Some individuals and media sources expressed concern over the Qatari involvement. Because Qatari Diar was a major stake owner, it practiced heavy say in the various tenants and uses permitted at the entire development, and the project was required to adhere to the restrictions of Sharia in finance which requires no interest be charged and as such Qatar invested equity only and did not provide a loan. There were concerns that the sale of alcohol, pork, or tobacco as well as businesses such as gambling, hotels, movie theaters, and nude entertainment would also be prohibited. The Hines-Archstone group said it had never intended to allow banks, gambling, or liquor stores, and although it was seeking a wine bar (or similar business) as a tenant. The Hines-Archstone group also stated that restaurants would be able to serve liquor, but that it would not be seeking tenants such as liquor stores whose primary business was the sale of alcohol. Automated teller machines would also be permitted, and the agreement between Hines-Archstone and Qatari Diar did not bar a bank as a tenant in the future.

The Washington Post noted that city officials confirmed that the exclusion of banks and bars in compliance with Islamic law was, in fact, a condition of the partnership agreement, and Mayor Vincent C. Gray (D) stated "you had to make a choice, either no development or development with certain caveats" also noting that they had preferred to not have banks or bars in the development as it didn't suit their vision of the neighborhood around the project. The mixed messages continued when Hines’ executives said that the "sharia-compliance" structure would have little to no bearing on the project.

The Qatari role in CityCenterDC was criticized by the conservative think tank Center for Security Policy as being what it called a "form of Islamic imperialism."

=== Islamic cultural center and Qatar Foundation International Headquarters ===
During construction of the development, The Washington Post reported that, in addition to primary ownership in the project, not-for-profit Qatar Foundation International (QFI) would open a large 15,188-square foot cultural center in one of the office buildings. The center would be "designed to increase knowledge and understanding of Arabic language and culture in the Americas", and its name would be "Al Bayt", which means "home" in Arabic.

QFI's major donor is Qatar Foundation, founded by members of the Qatari royal family, the House of Thani. In addition to the cultural center, The National reported that the Qatar Foundation is developing a website for the learning of the Arabic language, as it has invested "at least $4.5m this year [2013] on support for Arabic language classes in US schools".

The new center at 800 10th Street NW will also serve as QFI's office headquarters.

== See also ==
- Architecture of Washington, D.C.

== Bibliography ==
- Owen, David. Green Metropolis: Why Living Smaller, Living Closer, and Driving Less Are Keys to Sustainability. New York: Riverhead Books, 2009.
- Trancik, Roger. Finding Lost Space: Theories of Urban Design. New York: Wiley, 1986.
