= CC&F =

CC&F may refer to:

- Canadian Car and Foundry, a manufacturer of buses, railroad cars, and aircraft, now part of Bombardier
- Cabot, Cabot & Forbes, a US real estate management firm
