= 901 New York Avenue =

Office building in Washington, DC

901 New York Avenue NW
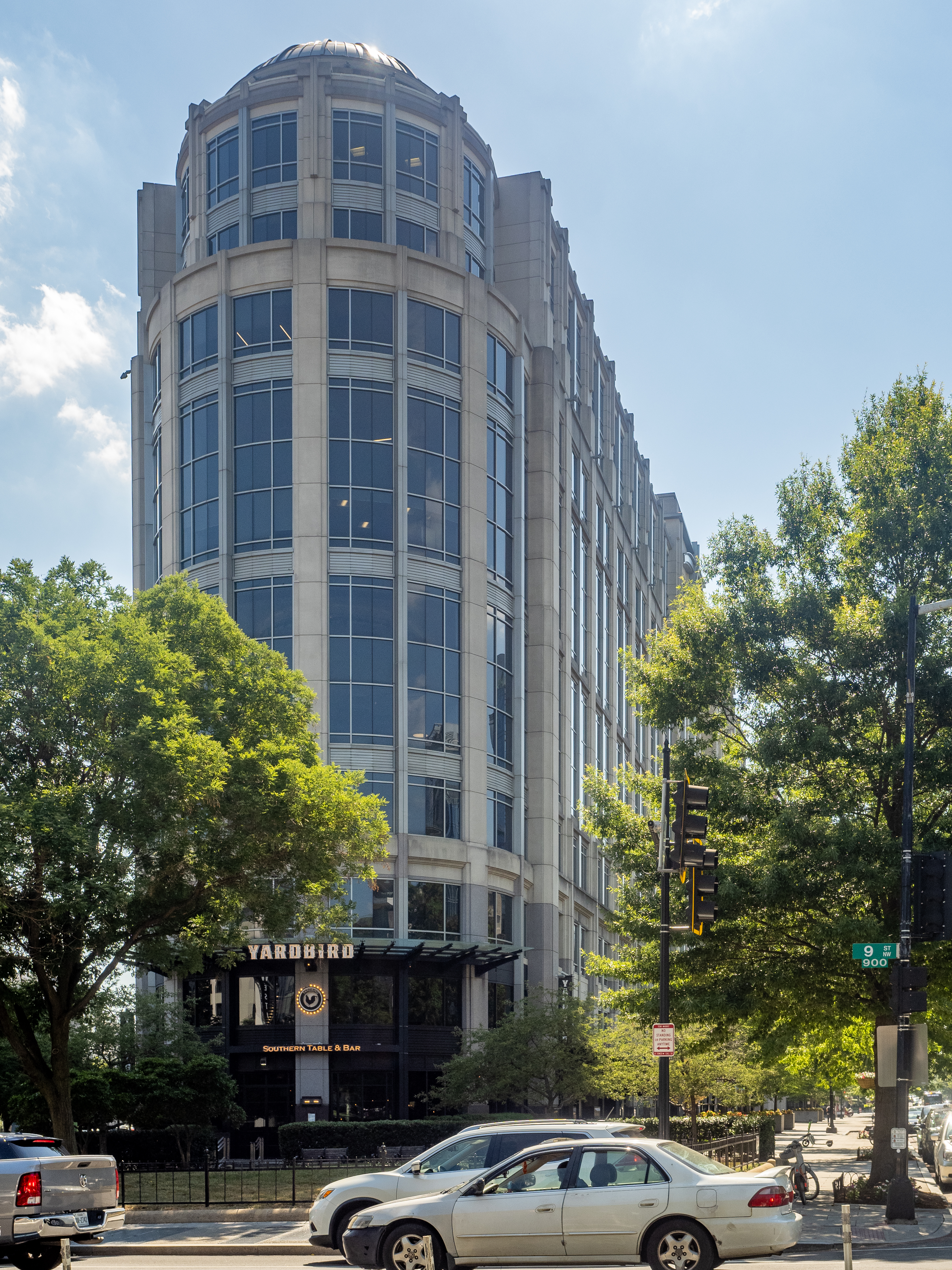
- East side of 901 New York Avenue NW
- Interactive map of the 901 New York Avenue NW area

General information
- Type: Office
- Location: Washington, D.C., United States
- Coordinates: 38.902172°N 77.02535°W
- Completed: 2005
- Operator: Boston Properties

Height
- Roof: 140 feet (43 m)

Technical details
- Floor count: 11
- Floor area: 540,000 square feet (50,000 m^{2})

Design and construction
- Architects: Davis Carter Scott, Ltd.
- Developer: Boston Properties

901 New York Avenue NW is a mid-rise Postmodern high-rise located in Downtown Washington, D.C., in the United States. The structure was developed by Boston Properties to help revitalize the Mount Vernon Square neighborhood, and was completed in 2005. It is located on a roughly triangular parcel bounded by New York Avenue NW, K Street NW, and 10th Street NW. It is north of the CityCenterDC mixed-use residential, office, and retail project.

The triangular area was originally home to Victorian housing, but in 1977, the city used eminent domain to purchase the area southwest of Mount Vernon Square itself, and over the next few years, the homes and businesses on these blocks were razed. In the 1980s, Golub Realty and Willco Construction purchased the site and proposed an 11-floor office block. They sold it to Peterson Co., who sold it to Monument Realty in May 1999. Monument Realty had envisaged building either an office and retail complex or a 1,000-room hotel. They finally sold it to Boston Properties for $43.2 million in October 2000. Boston Properties closed the parking lot on the site in late August 2002 and began building construction the following month.

The architectural height of the building is 140 feet (43 m), although the height of the main roof is 130.86 feet (39.89 m) and the height of the top floor is 118.36 feet (36.08 m). It has 11 stories and a four-story underground parking garage. Reports of the building's interior space vary widely, with 540,000 square feet (50,000 m^{2}) the most recently reported by the mainstream media. The facade is of polished granite and precast concrete in two colors. An atrium three stories in height with 36-foot (11 m) long arched steel trusses forms the lobby. Two tiny parks exist on the triangular parcel of land owned by the National Park Service. Acadiana, a 185-seat upscale restaurant on the ground floor that served Louisiana-and Cajun-style seafood, was cited by Esquire magazine as one of the best new restaurants in the entire United States in 2006. The restaurant closed in December 2018, and as of January 2019, no replacement tenants have been announced. Miami-based Yardbird Southern Table & Bar has taken Acadiana's former space in April 2021.

== History of the site ==
Initially, Victorian-style townhomes occupied the triangular area bounded by K Street NW, New York Avenue NW, and 10th Street NW on Mount Vernon Square. The neighborhood was originally a vibrant business district with sizeable Victorian homes, but the area went into a steep decline in the 1930s. During the 1968 Martin Luther King Jr. riots, the area around the square suffered rioting, arson, and extensive vandalism.

In 1977, the city used eminent domain to purchase the area southwest of Mount Vernon Square. Over the next few years, the homes and businesses on these blocks were razed. One of the last businesses to exist on the 901 New York Avenue NW lot was a Chinese restaurant named Nan King (which was one of the first restaurants in the city to serve dim sum). It stayed in business until 1979. Although the Washington Convention Center was constructed on the blocks just south of 901 New York Avenue, nothing was built on the triangular block itself. In time, it was turned into a parking lot.

Golub Realty and Willco Construction purchased the site from the city in the 1980s. Although the site was zoned for residential use only, in 1988, Golub/Willco proposed building an 11-story office building on the property. Under a city policy known as "residential linkage," Golub/Willco could construct their office building if they created or renovated low-income housing elsewhere. By May 1992, Golub/Willco had agreed to purchase a 27-unit apartment building in Northwest Washington and to restore 149 homes in Southeast Washington, but the proposed office building was never constructed.

Golub/Willco sold the lot to the Peterson Co., but in May 1999, the Peterson Co. sold the land to Monument Realty. Sources vary as to the amount, with reported prices of $14.5 million, $17.75 million, and $22 million. Monument Realty proposed two uses for the 51,000-square-foot (4,700 m^{2}) lot; a 530,000-square-foot (49,000 m^{2}) office and retail complex, or a 1,000-room hotel to serve visitors at the D.C. convention center. Monument estimated the hotel would cost $206 million. But to make it profitable, the cost would need to be reduced to $169 million. In 1999, the government of the District of Columbia created a tax increment district to promote downtown redevelopment and housing. Monument sought $57.3 million in tax-increment financing but never received approval from the city for the funds.

== Construction ==
In late October 2000, Monument Realty sold the parcel for $43.2 million to Boston Properties. Although media outlets reported that Boston Properties intended to build a hotel on the site, the company said it had never seriously considered the possibility. Rather, they had intended to construct an office building for occupancy by government agencies, law firms, and trade associations. The company announced that construction would commence in mid-2001 and be open to tenants by mid-2003. The architectural firm of Davis Carter Scott was hired to design the structure. The sale to Boston Properties closed on December 8, 2000. Meanwhile, the U.S. Securities and Exchange Commission (SEC) had requested proposals from real estate firms for the construction of a new 630,000-square-foot (59,000 m^{2}) headquarters. Boston Properties submitted its building for consideration by the SEC shortly after the sale closed. The SEC ruled out the site in mid-February 2001.

Boston Properties had submitted its building design for SEC consideration even though the site had not yet been zoned for office/retail space. About 4,000 square feet (370 m^{2}) of the 1.22-acre (0.49 ha) site was still zoned for residential housing. In April 2009, the D.C. Zoning Commission approved a "residential linkage" agreement with Boston Properties. The Zoning Commission did so because Monument Realty had agreed two years earlier to pay into a city-run affordable housing construction fund and spend $2 million to build three townhouses in a low-income area — satisfying the "residential linkage" requirement.

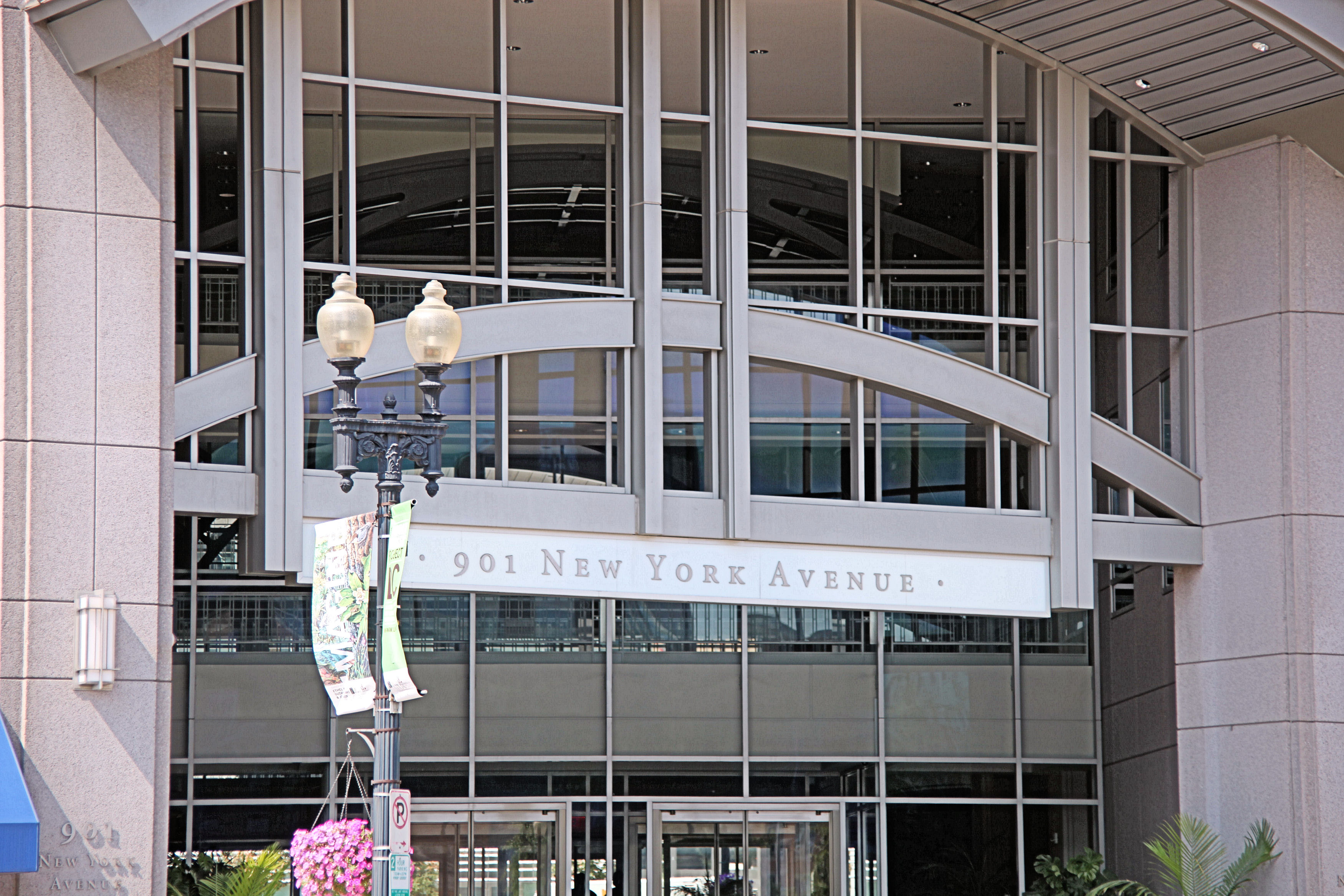
The main (south) entrance of 901 New York Avenue NW.

Despite the zoning victory, Boston Properties decided not to begin construction until a lead tenant signed. But six months later, in November 2001, the law firm of Finnegan, Henderson, Farabow, Garrett & Dunner signed a letter of intent to lease 225,000 square feet (20,900 m^{2}) of the building. Boston Properties intended to build a 535,000-square-foot (49,700 m^{2}), 11-story structure to accommodate its tenants. In March 2002, the company said it would begin construction in September. It also announced that the 27,000 square feet (2,500 m^{2}) ground floor would be devoted to retail, with four levels of underground parking. The Finnegan firm's contract was signed in March 2002, at which time Boston Properties increased the floor space to 535,000-square-foot (49,700 m^{2}) and delayed the expected completion date to late 2004.

Boston Properties closed the parking lot in late August 2002 and began construction the following month. A month after construction began, the law firm of Shea & Gardner signed a lease at 901 New York Avenue for 75,000 square feet (7,000 m^{2}) of space. Boston Properties now said the delivery date for the building was September 2004. In February 2003, the law firm of Powell Goldstein Frazer & Murphy signed a lease for 75,000 square feet (7,000 m^{2}) of space (even though the media had previously reported that it had turned down Boston Properties). By then, the building's square footage was 538,461 square feet (50,024.7 m^{2}) on 11 stories. By September 2003, more than 80 percent of the building had been leased, although the delivery date was again delayed to late 2004. In May 2004, the law firm of Piper Rudnick reportedly signed a lease for 200,000 square feet (19,000 m^{2}) of space in the building, but the firm later opted for a lease for 230,000 square feet (21,000 m^{2}) in a Boston Properties building located at 505 Ninth Street NW.

In June 2004, 901 New York Avenue NW was 75 percent leased at an average cost of $36 per square foot. The delivery date was changed once more to September 2004. The building was eventually delivered in early 2005.

=== Possible convention center hotel ===
Even as the building was being erected, it was threatened with demolition. The construction of the Walter E. Washington Convention Center left the city with very few hotel rooms to accommodate the greatly expanded number of visitors expected. A convention center "headquarters hotel" was urgently needed, but controversy raged for several years over where to put the hotel. In mid-2004, the Washington Convention and Sports Authority (WCSA) commissioned a study of potential sites. In the fall of 2004, the WCSA study stated that one of three options was to seize 901 New York Avenue NW and build a 1,500-room convention center hotel on the site.

In June 2005, the Council of the District of Columbia voted to put the new convention center "headquarters hotel" west of 9th Street NW between L Street NW and Massachusetts Avenue NW.

== Architecture and design ==
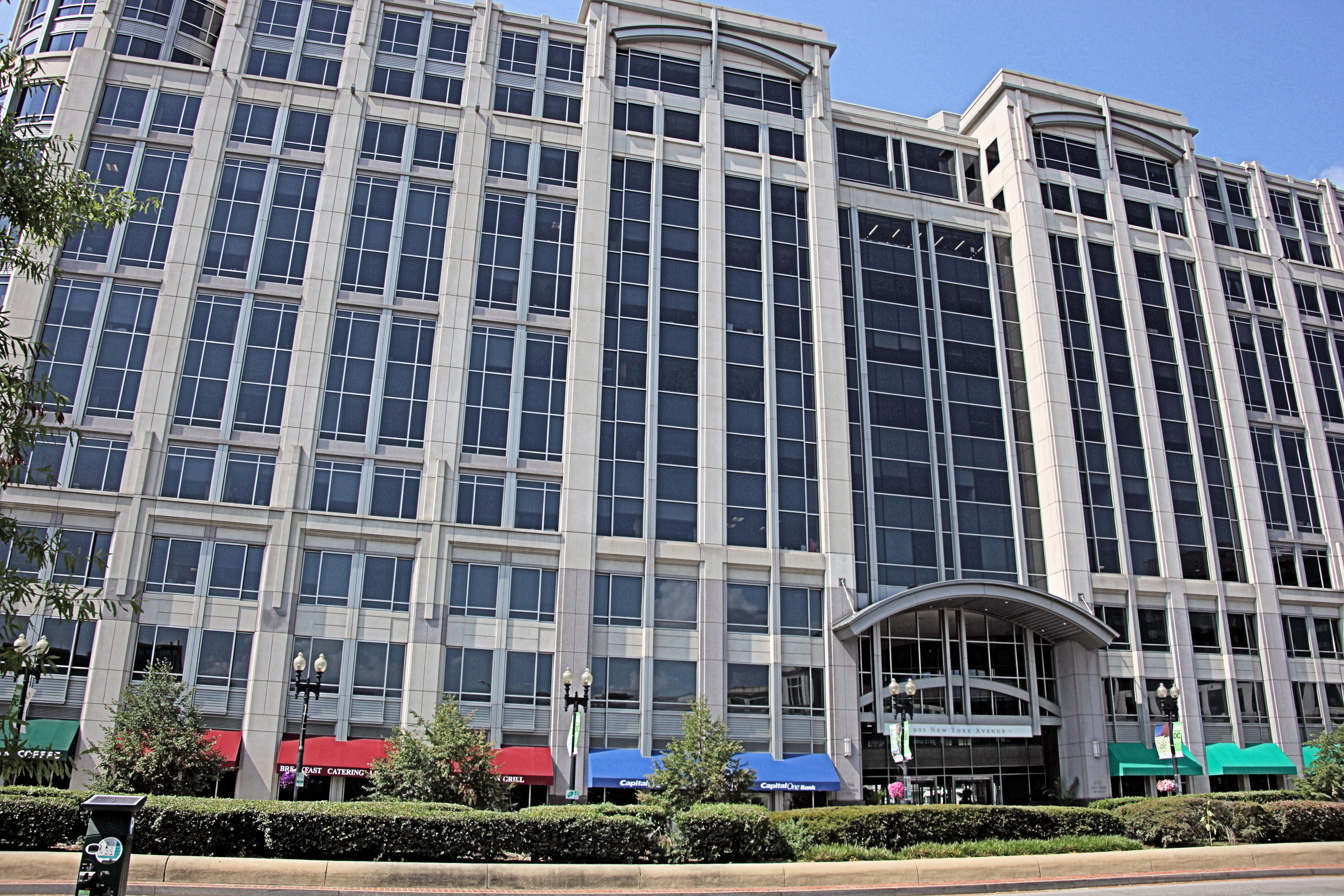
The south facade of 901 New York Avenue NW, showing the main entrance and atrium.

901 New York Avenue NW is an 11-story Class A office building with retail space on the ground (first) floor. The architectural height of the building is 140 feet (43 m). However, the height of the main roof is 130.86 feet (39.89 m) and the height of the top floor is 118.36 feet (36.08 m). Reports of the building's interior space vary widely, with 540,000 square feet (50,000 m^{2}) the most recently reported by the mainstream media. However, Clark Construction Group, the general contractor on the $54 million building, says the interior space is 530,000 square feet (49,000 m^{2}). There is 25,000 square feet (2,300 m^{2}) of retail space on the ground floor and four underground parking levels.

The facade is of polished granite and precast concrete in two colors. An atrium three stories in height with 36-foot (11 m) long arched steel trusses form the lobby. The lobby's ceiling consists of square decorative hollow beams and acrylic panels.

Two tiny parks exist on the triangular parcel of land owned by the National Park Service. These open spaces were preserved and overlaid with precast concrete pavers. Benches were added to permit public seating.

Clark Construction was the general contractor. Smislova, Kehnemui & Associates was the structural engineer, and Girard Engineering handled the mechanical engineering. Clark Interiors, a subsidiary of Clark Construction, and Davis Carter Scott designed the Finnegan offices (which are contained on floors five through 11). A grand staircase surrounded by a curved glass wall extends to all floors. The other building features constructed were a cafeteria, computer repair facility, data center, kitchen, mailroom, meeting rooms, offices, reception area, and videotaping facility.

Clark Interiors and SKB Architecture & Design designed the Goodwin Procter law offices extending from floors six through nine. The four floors are connected by a grand staircase manufactured of glass, stainless steel, stone, and wood. The wall alongside the staircase comprises decorative panels wrapped in fabric, wood trim, and stainless steel accents.

Clark Interiors and Gensler (a Washington, D.C., design firm) also designed the offices of Boston Properties, which moved its D.C. offices into the building. The 27,000-square-foot (2,500 m^{2}) space contains a reception area, conference rooms, and offices. The reception area floor is clad in stone, with carpeting in sections.

Critics have not widely reviewed the building. Hank Steuver, writing for The Washington Post, said the exterior exhibits "a sweep and charm".

== Ground floor and restaurant tenant ==
One of its ground floor tenants won several awards during its 13 years of operation, ultimately closing in 2018. Acadiana was a 185-seat upscale restaurant that served Louisiana-and Cajun-style seafood. Esquire magazine called it one of the best new restaurants in the entire United States in 2006. Frommer's said of the restaurant, "The restaurant's high ceilings, ornate chandeliers, and oversized urns fit with the prevailing, over-the-top atmosphere. This is New Orleans right here. New Orleanians say the cuisine's the real thing, starting with the biscuits, served with a pepper jelly and cream cheese condiment, continuing to deviled eggs, charbroiled oysters, and crabmeat and artichoke gratin starters, and even further to jambalaya, étouffée, red snapper in an almondine sauce and barbecue shrimp. Service is excellent".

== Bibliography ==
- Bednar, Michael J. L' Enfant's Legacy: Public Open Spaces in Washington, D.C. Baltimore: Johns Hopkins University Press, 2006.
