= Mortimer Zuckerman =

Canadian businessman (born 1937)

Mort Zuckerman
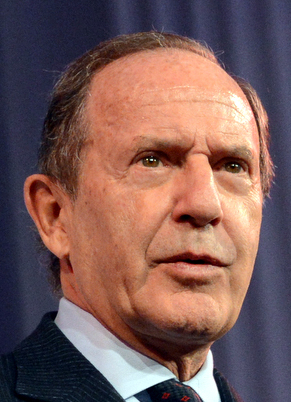
- Zuckerman in 2013
- Born: Mortimer Benjamin Zuckerman; June 4, 1937 (age 89); Montreal, Quebec, Canada
- Education: McGill University (BA, BCL); University of Pennsylvania (MBA); Harvard University (LLM)
- Occupations: Executive chairman, Boston Properties; Editor-in-chief, U.S. News & World Report
- Political party: Republican
- Spouse: Marla Prather (m. 1996; div. 2001)
- Children: 2

Mortimer Benjamin Zuckerman (born June 4, 1937) is a Canadian-American billionaire media proprietor, magazine editor, and investor. He is the co-founder, executive chairman and former CEO of Boston Properties, one of the largest real estate investment trusts in the United States. Zuckerman is also the owner and publisher of U.S. News & World Report, and its editor-in-chief. He formerly owned the New York Daily News, The Atlantic, and Fast Company. As of August 2024, his net worth is estimated at US$2.6 billion.

== Early life and education ==
Zuckerman was born on June 4, 1937, in Montreal, Quebec, the son of Esther and Abraham Zuckerman, who owned a tobacco and candy store. His family is Jewish, and his grandfather was an Orthodox rabbi. Zuckerman was raised in Outremont, and attended Adath Israel School and Strathcona Academy. He entered McGill University in Montreal at the age of 16. He graduated from McGill with a B.A. in 1957 and a B.C.L. in 1961, although he never took the bar exam. That same year, Zuckerman entered the Wharton School at the University of Pennsylvania in Philadelphia, where he earned an M.B.A. degree with distinction. In 1962, he received an LL.M. degree from Harvard Law School.

== Business career ==
After graduating, Zuckerman remained at Harvard Business School as an associate professor for nine years. He also taught at Yale University. Zuckerman spent seven years at the real estate firm Cabot, Cabot & Forbes, where he rose to the position of senior vice president and chief financial officer.

In 1980, he purchased the literary magazine The Atlantic, where he was the chairman from 1980 to 1999. In 1999 he sold the magazine to David G. Bradley for US$12 million. Commenting on this sale and that of Fast Company magazine, which he sold for $365 million at the height of the tech boom in 2000, he quipped, "I averaged out."

While he still owned Atlantic Monthly, in 1984, Zuckerman bought U.S. News & World Report, where he remains its editor-in-chief. In 1993, he bought the New York Daily News, which he ran until 2017 when he sold the paper to Tronc.

== Politics ==
In addition to his publishing and real-estate interests, Zuckerman is also a frequent commentator on world affairs, both as an editorialist and on television. He regularly appeared on MSNBC and The McLaughlin Group and writes columns for U.S. News & World Report and the New York Daily News.

Zuckerman has varied in his party affiliations over time, since the late 1970s.

On July 12, 2010, Zuckerman said in an interview that he had helped to write one of President Barack Obama's political speeches. Long-time Obama speechwriters Jon Favreau and Ben Rhodes disputed that and asserted that neither "has ever met or spoken to Mort Zuckerman." Zuckerman later published a clarification of his remarks by stating that his help had come in the form of private conversations with various political officials in which he had offered advice and perspective on different issues.

Zuckerman, a long-time supporter of the Democratic party who cast his vote for Barack Obama in the 2008 presidential election, was critical of President Obama on several fronts. Following the downgrade of US treasury debt by Standard & Poor's in 2011, Zuckerman wrote in The Wall Street Journal: "I long for a triple-A president to run a triple-A country." After initially supporting Obama's call for heavy infrastructure spending to revive the economy, Zuckerman criticized the composition of the plan: "if you look at the make-up of the stimulus program, roughly half of it went to state and local municipalities, which is in effect to the municipal unions which are at the core of the Democratic party."

On Obama's healthcare reform bill, Zuckerman stated, "Eighty percent of the country wanted them to get costs under control, not to extend the coverage. They used all their political capital to extend the coverage. I always had the feeling the country looked at the bill and said, 'Well, he may be doing it because he wants to be a transformational president, but I want to get my costs down!'"

== Personal life ==
Zuckerman became a US citizen in 1977.

Before marrying, Zuckerman's dating history included writers Betty Rollin, Nora Ephron, Arianna Stassinopoulos Huffington and a four-year relationship with feminist activist Gloria Steinem in the late 1980s, early 1990s.

In 1996 Zuckerman married Marla Prather, a curator of the National Gallery of Art. He and Prather have a daughter, Abigail, together. The couple divorced in 2001, and Prather later married lawyer Jonathan D. Schiller. Zuckerman's second daughter, Renee Esther, was born on December 19, 2008. Zuckerman was 71 at the time; the mother has not been identified.

On the November 28, 2014, episode of The McLaughlin Group, Zuckerman said he was a vegan and has been since 2008, confirming what in November 2010 had been published in Bloomberg Businessweek, "The Rise of the Power Vegans." Zuckerman last appeared on The McLaughlin Group on July 31, 2015, making a case for Texas governor Rick Perry's presidential run during that episode. A day later Zuckerman issued a statement that he would not be appearing at the East Hampton Artists-Writers softball game, the first time he would miss the game since 1993. The same month, the New York Post reported he turned over the sale of the New York Daily News to his nephews and has commented minimally on its dissolution.

Zuckerman contributed to a birthday book of letters for Jeffrey Epstein’s 50th birthday, along with a host of other notable names. Zuckerman was identified as one of Jeffrey Epstein's clients, paying Epstein millions of dollars for estate planning and financial services between 2013 and 2015, years after Epstein's conviction for child sex crimes.

== Philanthropy ==
In May 2004, Zuckerman pledged $10 million to Harvard University to fund a fellowship for students who are pursuing or have earned professional degree in law, business or medicine but are interested in a degree at Harvard’s Harvard Graduate School of Education, Harvard T.H. Chan School of Public Health, or the Harvard Kennedy School. The Zuckerman Fellowship funds a scholarship for full tuition, fees, and health insurance plus an annual stipend for one academic year.

In May 2006, Zuckerman pledged $100 million from his charitable trust towards Memorial Sloan Kettering's new cancer research facility. His donation was the largest single commitment by an individual in Memorial Sloan Kettering's history.

In December 2012, Zuckerman pledged $200 million to endow the Mortimer B. Zuckerman Mind Brain Behavior Institute at Columbia University.

== Involvement in Jewish organizations and Israel ==
Between 2001 and 2003, Zuckerman was the chairman of the Conference of Presidents of Major American Jewish Organizations. Typically, the nominating committee attempts to choose a person who is both respected and uncontroversial. However, Zuckerman was widely opposed by liberal Jewish factions. Nonetheless, Zuckerman was eventually elected and served a full term.

In their 2006 paper The Israel Lobby and U.S. Foreign Policy, John Mearsheimer, political science professor at the University of Chicago, and Stephen Walt, academic dean of the Harvard Kennedy School at Harvard University, named Zuckerman a member of the media wing of the "Israeli lobby" in the United States. Zuckerman replied: "I would just say this: The allegations of this disproportionate influence of the Jewish community remind me of the 92-year-old man sued in a paternity suit. He said he was so proud, he pleaded guilty."

George W. Bush appointed Zuckerman to serve on the Honorary Delegation to accompany him to Jerusalem for the celebration of the 60th anniversary of the State of Israel in May 2008.

== Appointments and associations ==
Zuckerman serves on the boards of trustees of several educational and private institutions such as New York University, the Aspen Institute, Memorial Sloan-Kettering Cancer Center, the Hole in the Wall Gang Fund, and the Center for Communications. He is a member of the JPMorgan's National Advisory Board, the Council on Foreign Relations, the Washington Institute for Near East Policy, and the International Institute for Strategic Studies. He has been a president of the board of trustees of the Dana–Farber Cancer Institute in Boston.

Zuckerman is known to be a mentor to and close associate of Daniel M. Snyder, former owner of the NFL football team Washington Commanders, and has been a financial backer to Snyder's business ventures (CampusUSA magazine), and was a shareholder and director in Snyder Communications Inc., a marketing services business which was taken over in 2000 (by Havas Advertising).

== Honors ==
Zuckerman has received three honorary degrees, including one from Colby College. He was awarded Commandeur de l'Ordre des Arts et des Lettres by the government of France in 1994, a lifetime achievement award from Guild Hall and a gold medal from the American Institute of Architecture in New York.

== Bernard Madoff investment scandal ==
Zuckerman was one of the investors defrauded in the Madoff investment scandal Ponzi scheme, by way of investments with Fifth Avenue Synagogue president J. Ezra Merkin who staked roughly 10% ($30 million) of Zuckerman's charitable trust fund with Bernie Madoff. Zuckerman has stated that all current charitable obligations will still be honored with no changes. At a forum at the YIVO Institute for Jewish Research in New York, he remarked that no one since Julius and Ethel Rosenberg, executed in 1953 for giving atomic secrets to the Soviet Union, "has so damaged the image and self respect of American Jews."

On April 6, 2009, Zuckerman filed a lawsuit against Merkin and his Gabriel Capital LP. The lawsuit claims fraud and negligent representation and seeks unspecified punitive damages. Merkin had a "huge incentive not to disclose Madoff's role, especially to investors like Zuckerman" because he charged clients "substantial fees" to manage both his Ascot Partners LP and Gabriel Capital. The lawsuit claims over US$40 million in losses for placing his assets with Bernard L. Madoff Investment Securities LLC without his knowledge. Zuckerman invested US$25 million with Merkin's Ascot Fund in 2006 through his Charitable Remainder Trust or CRT Investments Limited and personally invested US$15 million with Merkin's Gabriel Capital. Merkin charged Zuckerman a 1.5% fee and imposed significant "lock-up restrictions on redemptions", but his agreement with Gabriel Capital contains an arbitration clause against Merkin for his lost personal US$15 million investment. The lawsuit also named the accounting firm BDO Seidman LLP and a related entity called BDO Tortuga as defendants.

The case is CRT Investments Ltd. v. J. Ezra Merkin, 601052/2009, filed in New York State Supreme Court (Manhattan).

== 2010 Senate election ==
Although Zuckerman has been known as a Democrat, he was speculated to run for the Senate in 2010 as a Republican or an independent in order to avoid an expensive primary.

Critics pointed to apparent inconsistencies in Zuckerman's publicly stated positions on key issues. Wayne Barrett, of the Village Voice wrote: "If real estate titan Mort Zuckerman gets into the senate race against Kirsten Gillibrand, we'll finally have a vigorous debate about the big-ticket issues troubling Americans. All we have to do is listen to Mort and we'll get both sides of the key economic questions."

However, on March 2, 2010, he declined to run, citing family and work obligations.

== See also ==
- List of investors in Bernard L. Madoff Securities
- List of vegans
