= Cabot, Cabot & Forbes =

American real estate development firm

- Industry: Real estate
- Founded: 1897
- Founder: Francis Murray Forbes
- Headquarters: Boston, Massachusetts, US
- Revenue: Unknown
- Website: www.ccfne.com

Cabot, Cabot & Forbes (CC&F) is a real estate development firm in Boston, Massachusetts. It was founded by Francis Murray Forbes of the Boston Brahmin Forbes family in 1897 as a real estate management firm. Jay Doherty purchased the company in 2004 from its previous owners, the Marshall Field Family and is serving as the present CEO of the firm.

== History ==
The firm was founded in 1897 by two members of Boston's Cabot family and F. Murray Forbes, originally to manage the real estate assets of the two families. In the 1940s, CC&F started developing industrial parks.

In 1948, the firm developed the 300-acre New England Industrial Center in Needham, Massachusetts.

In the early 1950s, the firm entered the real estate development business, led by Alexander C. Forbes and Gerald W. Blakeley Jr. In 1956, the firm was bought by Blakely.

In 1979, it was bought by Field Enterprises, whose ownership passed to Marshall Field V in 1984.

In 1959, CC&F partnered with Paine Webber to form the Laguna Niguel Corporation, which developed Laguna Niguel, one of California's first master planned communities. Cabot Road and Forbes Road in Laguna Hills and Laguna Niguel are named after the firm.

As of 1987, CC&F owned 15 million square feet of industrial and office space in 20 states.

In May 2014, CC&F and Boston Andes Capital purchased a two-acre site across from the Quincy Adams subway station in Quincy, Massachusetts, for $10.3 million, planning to build 180 apartments., a project they completed in 2016.

In November 2017, the firm purchased the locally well-known site of Boston Cab for $51 million.

In 2020, CC&F completed a $300 million redevelopment project to rebuild the St. Gabriel’s Monastery in Brighton as 555 luxury apartments.

From 1960 to the first few years of the new millennium, Cabot, Cabot & Forbes had developed more than 60 million square feet of commercial space across the country, including doing master planning for more than 100 industrial and office parks.

Among notable American business leaders who have worked at the firm: Mortimer Zuckerman (1962-1970), Gerald Blakeley, Edward H. Linde, and Charles H. Spaulding (founder of Spaulding & Slye).

== Westwood Station ==
In 2006, Cabot, Cabot and Forbes and partner Commonfund Realty Inc., announced the conceived Westwood Station, a 150-acre mixed-use community of office buildings, retail stores and luxury condominiums, located near Route 128 and the MBTA rail station in Westwood, Massachusetts, with an estimated cost of $1.5 billion. The original project planning included 1.5 million square feet of office buildings, 1.35 million square feet of retail, one thousand residential units and two hotels. Over the following years, the developers failed to find financing for the project, facing different problems, and affected by the credit market crash of late 2008.

In 2009, the developers announced halting the project as they were unable to secure a construction loan for the first phase, which was a planned 1.7 million square feet of land, at a $700 million estimated cost.

In September 2010, the Dublin-based Anglo Irish Bank, the project's primary lender, pushed to exit the deal. On October, the Woburn-based Eastern Real Estate LLC bought the project.

In 2013, Cabot, Cabot and Forbes sold the property to New England Development for $45 million. Following the selling, the project changed into the University Station, less than half size of the original project. It was opened in 2015.

== Selected projects ==
=== Boston Area ===
- New England Industrial Center, Needham, (1948)
- Technology Square, Cambridge (1963)
- 28 State Street (1969)
- One Boston Place (1970, 6th-tallest building in Boston)
- 100 Summer Street (1974, sold to EQ Office in 1998)
- 60 State Street (1977)

=== Other ===
- King of Prussia Industrial Park, King of Prussia, Pennsylvania (1955 on)
- Field Enterprises Inc., Illinois (1979)
- 250 West Pratt Street, Baltimore (completed 1986)
