= 28 State Street =

Skyscraper in Boston, Massachusetts

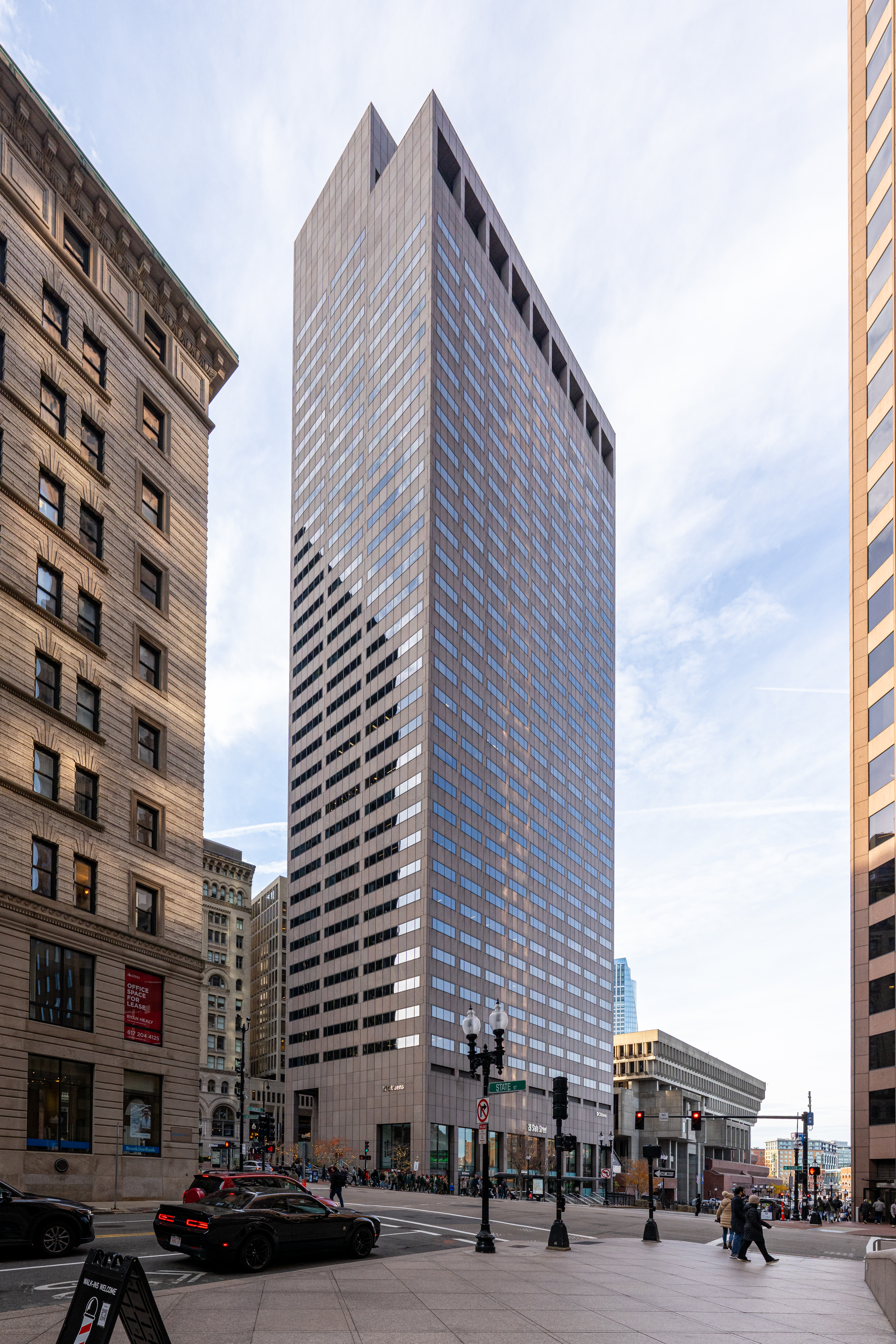
- Interactive map of the 28 State Street area

General information
- Status: Completed
- Type: Office
- Architectural style: Modernism
- Location: 28 State Street, Boston, Massachusetts, United States
- Coordinates: 42.35933°N 71.05747°W
- Completed: 1970

Height
- Roof: 500 ft (152 m)

Technical details
- Floor count: 40
- Floor area: 570,057 sq ft (52,960.0 m^{2})

Design and construction
- Architect: Emery Roth & Sons
- Developer: EQ Office

28 State Street is a modern skyscraper in the Government Center neighborhood of Boston, Massachusetts, United States. Built in 1969, it is Boston's 23rd-tallest building, standing 500 feet (152 m) tall, and housing 40 floors. It has been known as the New England Merchants Bank Building and the Bank of New England Building.

The building has a rectangular footprint which is then setback once near the top floor. The tower does not have a crown and in fact has a flattened roof.

It was designed by Emery Roth & Sons and Edward Larrabee Barnes Associates and developed by Cabot, Cabot & Forbes.

On April 5, 1976 an historic civil rights clash, dubbed The Soiling of Old Glory, was caught on film outside 28 State Street, seen at left in this disturbing picture. It earned photographer Stanley Forman a Pulitzer Prize.

== Tenants ==
- Alta Communications
- One Medical Group
- Citizens Bank
- Citadel

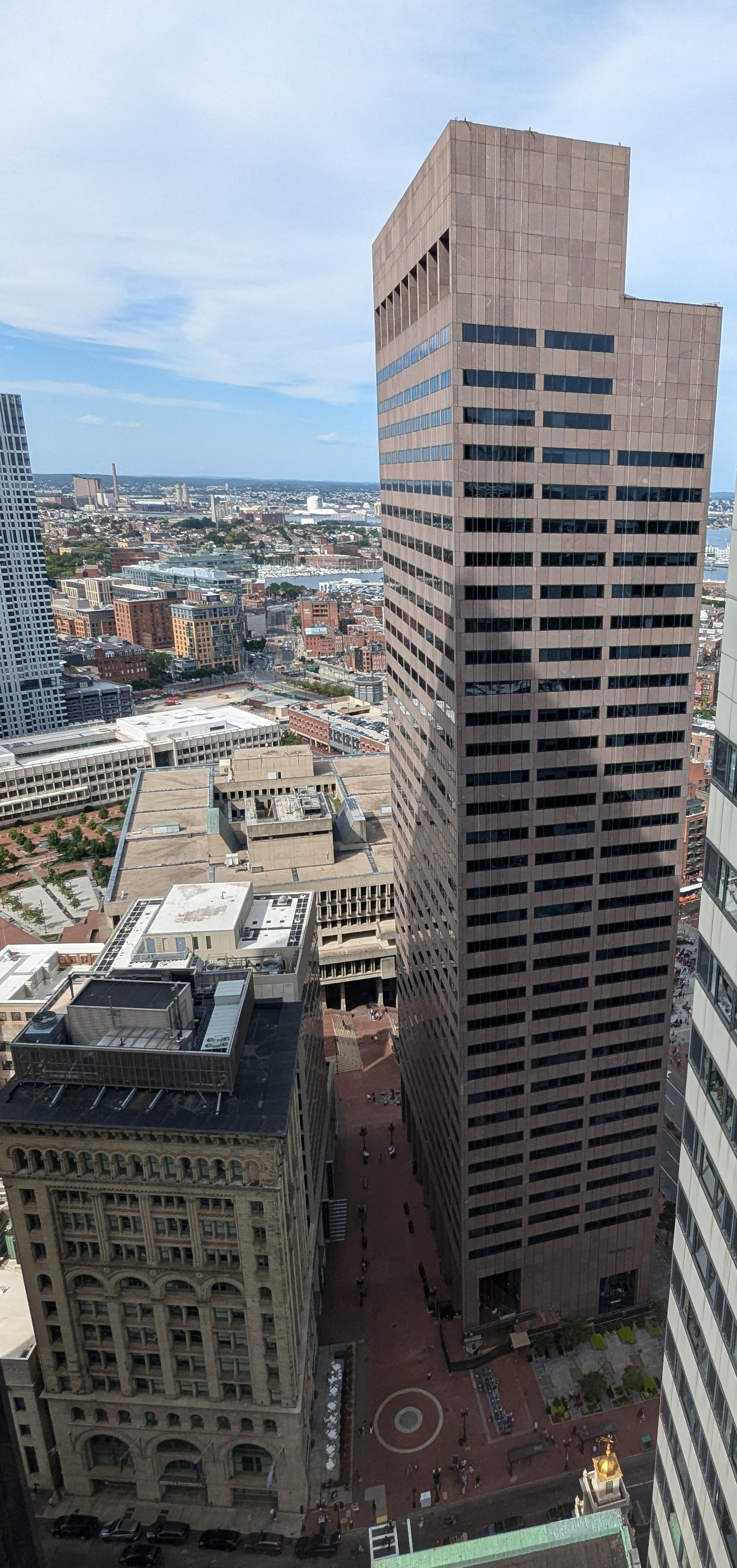
28 State Street and the Ames Building looking north on Washington Street in September 2024.

== See also ==
- List of tallest buildings in Boston
