= 2012 World TeamTennis season =

- Duration: July 9, 2012 – July 28, 2012
- Eastern Conference Champions champions: Washington Kastles
- Western Conference Champions champions: Sacramento Capitals

WTT Finals
- Date: September 16, 2012
- Venue: Charleston, SC
- Champions: Washington Kastles

Seasons
- 2011 2013

The 2012 World TeamTennis season is the 37th season of the top professional tennis league in the United States.

Before the start of the 2012 season, the St. Louis Aces announced they would not compete this year. The Newport Beach Breakers changed their name to the Orange County Breakers.

== Competition format ==
The 2012 World TeamTennis season included 8 teams, split into two conferences (Eastern and Western). The Eastern Conference and Western Conference had 4 teams each. Each team played a 14 match regular season schedule, with 7 home and 7 away matches. World TeamTennis's playoff format consisted of the top two teams in each conference playing a semifinal on either September 14 (Eastern Conference) or September 15 (Western Conference), and the winners of each match playing in the final on September 16, 2012.

== Standings ==
Eastern Conference
Pos	Team	MP	W	L	Perc	MB	GW	GL
1	Washington Kastles	14	14	0	1.000	-	308	220
2	New York Sportimes	14	9	5	0.643	5	290	250
3	Boston Lobsters	14	5	9	0.357	9	251	283
4	Philadelphia Freedoms	14	5	9	0.357	9	250	281

2012 Eastern Conference Playoffs

Western Conference
Pos	Team	MP	W	L	Perc	MB	GW	GL
1	Orange County Breakers	14	8	6	0.571	-	274	261
2	Sacramento Capitals	14	7	7	0.500	1	278	274
3	Kansas City Explorers	14	4	10	0.286	4	245	291
4	Springfield Lasers	14	4	10	0.286	4	250	286

2012 Western Conference Playoffs

== Results table ==
Abbreviation and Color Key: Boston Lobsters - BOS • Kansas City Explorers - KCE • New York Sportimes - NYS • Orange County Breakers - OCB Philadelphia Freedoms - PHI • Sacramento Capitals - SAC • Springfield Lasers - SPR • Washington Kastles - WAS Win • Loss • Home • Away
Team	Match													
Team	1	2	3	4	5	6	7	8	9	10	11	12	13	14
Boston Lobsters	SAC	PHI	WAS	SPR	WAS	OCB	KCE	NYS	NYS	PHI	NYS	PHI	OCB	SAC
Boston Lobsters	20-14	17-24	19-24	21-15	11-20	19-24	20-19	18-22	22-20	21-13	16-24	17-18	13-21	17-25
Kansas City Explorers	SPR	OCB	SAC	SPR	NYS	PHI	BOS	SAC	OCB	WAS	SPR	SPR	WAS	NYS
Kansas City Explorers	23-16	8-25	21-22	17-16	16-23	16-20	19-20	21-22	22-15	8-25	22-21	17-22	17-22	18-22
New York Sportimes	SPR	WAS	PHI	KCE	SAC	PHI	BOS	PHI	WAS	BOS	BOS	WAS	SPR	KCE
New York Sportimes	22-14	18-20	22-16	23-16	17-18	23-16	22-18	19-18	20-21	20-22	24-16	16-21	22-16	22-18
Orange County Breakers	WAS	KCE	SAC	SAC	SPR	BOS	OCB	WAS	KCE	SPR	SAC	SAC	BOS	PHI
Orange County Breakers	18-22	25-8	14-24	23-20	17-20	24-19	19-23	13-24	15-22	24-17	19-16	21-18	21-13	21-15
Philadelphia Freedoms	SAC	BOS	NYS	SPR	WAS	KCE	NYS	OCB	NYS	BOS	WAS	BOS	SAC	OCB
Philadelphia Freedoms	16-22	24-17	16-22	21-18	13-22	20-16	16-23	23-19	18-19	13-21	16-21	18-17	21-23	15-21
Sacramento Capitals	BOS	PHI	KCE	OCB	OCB	NYS	WAS	SPR	KCE	SPR	OCB	OCB	PHI	BOS
Sacramento Capitals	14-20	22-16	22-21	24-14	20-23	18-17	19-21	19-20	22-21	16-23	16-19	18-21	23-21	25-17
Springfield Lasers	KCE	NYS	WAS	KCE	PHI	BOS	OCB	SAC	SAC	OCB	KCE	KCE	NYS	WAS
Springfield Lasers	16-23	14-22	18-20	16-17	18-21	15-21	20-17	20-19	23-16	17-24	21-22	22-17	16-22	14-25
Washington Kastles	OCB	SPR	NYS	BOS	PHI	BOS	SAC	OCB	NYS	KCE	PHI	NYS	KCE	SPR
Washington Kastles	22-18	20-18	20-18	24-19	22-13	20-11	21-19	24-13	21-20	25-8	21-16	21-16	22-17	25-14

== Playoffs ==
Conference Championships
1	Washington Kastles	19
2	New York Sportimes	15
1	Orange County Breakers'	15
2	Sacramento Capitals	25

WTT Finals
Washington Kastles	20
Sacramento Capitals	19
