= 2014 San Diego Aviators season =

- Conference: 1st Western

Record
- 2014 record: 10 wins, 4 losses
- Home record: 6 wins, 1 loss
- Road record: 4 wins, 3 losses
- Games won–lost: 287–236

Team info
- Owner(s): Russell Geyser (majority); Jack McGrory (minority); Fred Luddy (minority)
- President/CEO: Billy Berger
- General manager: Shelly Hall
- Coach: David Macpherson
- Stadium: Valley View Casino Center (capacity: 3,398)

The 2014 San Diego Aviators season was the 20th season of the franchise in World TeamTennis (WTT) and its first playing in San Diego, California.

The Aviators went from having the worst record in WTT in 2013, (as the New York Sportimes) to the league's best record in 2014. The team made the playoffs for the first time in two years and finished first in its conference for the first time in four years. The Aviators were led by Daniela Hantuchová who was named WTT Female Most Valuable Player and Somdev Devvarman who was named WTT Male Rookie of the Year. David Macpherson, coach of the Aviators, was recognized as WTT Coach of the Year. The Aviators hosted the Springfield Lasers in the Western Conference Championship Match in the first postseason home match for the franchise in four years. The Lasers defeated the Aviators, 22–17, to end the season for San Diego.

== Season recap ==
=== Relocation to San Diego ===
On January 15, 2014, Claude Okin, CEO of the New York Sportimes announced that the franchise had been sold to businessman Russell Geyser and his minority partner Jack McGrory, and the team would be relocated to San Diego, California and renamed the San Diego Aviators. Okin said, "This is a bittersweet event for me personally. I am very glad to have found a motivated and able new owner for the franchise: a person who will be able to re-imagine it in another great tennis town—but I will miss my team." Geyser said that the team's new name was chosen "to be evocative of San Diego’s long storied history of military and commercial aviation."

In a filing with the U.S. Securities and Exchange Commission, the Aviators disclosed a private placement seeking equity financing in the amount of US$900,000. The team was expected to net $860,000 after a broker's commission paid to Sandlapper Securities.

=== Trade for the Bryan Brothers ===
The Aviators' first move after relocating to San Diego was to hire David Macpherson as their coach. Macpherson immediately set to work recruiting players to fill the Aviators' roster while he was in Melbourne coaching Bob and Mike Bryan at the 2014 Australian Open. Since Macperson was the Bryan Brothers' coach, there was little doubt he was persuading them to play in WTT in San Diego. It didn't take long for Macpherson to convince the Bryans. However, the Texas Wild had the right to protect and draft them. Within a few days, on January 23, 2014, the Aviators acquired the Bryan Brothers in a trade with the Wild in exchange for undisclosed financial consideration. After the trade, Mike Bryan said, "Growing up in California, we know that San Diego is a great tennis town and we are excited to play in front of the fans, family and friends." Bob Bryan added, "We have always loved playing Mylan World TeamTennis. The competition is very tough and every point is huge. It’s fast-paced and intense, and we love playing with that type of energy. We want to win for our city and our teammates. So we can’t wait for the Aviators' season to start."

=== Drafts ===
With the Sportimes finishing with WTT's worst record in 2013, the Aviators had the top pick in each round of both WTT drafts. With the first overall selection in the marquee player draft, the Aviators chose Bob and Mike Bryan whom they had protected as a doubles team. Thus, the identical twins simultaneously became the first players who could call themselves San Diego Aviators. With the first pick in the second round of the marquee player draft (ninth overall), the Aviators selected Daniela Hantuchová who committed to playing in WTT full-time for the 2014 season. The Aviators protected Květa Peschke, making her the only holdover player from the 2013 Sportimes on the 2014 Aviators' roster. With the first pick in the first round of the roster player draft, the Aviators selected Somdev Devvarman. They used their second round choice for Raven Klaasen. With Hantuchová committed to playing full-time, the Aviators knew they did not need all four of their picks in the roster draft. They also knew they could wait until the fourth round to take Peschke whom they had protected. So, the Aviators traded their third round pick to the Springfield Lasers in exchange for the Lasers' fourth round pick and cash consideration. The Lasers used the pick they acquired from the Aviators to select Michael Russell. Russell went on to have the highest winning percentage in men's singles in WTT in 2014. He also won the opening set of men's singles in the Western Conference Championship Match against the Aviators and paired with Ross Hutchins to serve out the match against the Bryan Brothers and eliminate the Aviators. The Aviators used their fourth round pick (22nd overall) to draft Peschke and passed on the fourth round pick (27th overall) that they acquired in the trade with the Lasers, since their roster was full.

=== Debut in San Diego ===
The Aviators played their home matches during their first season in San Diego at the Valley View Casino Center. The Aviators' inaugural match was a 23–11 home victory over the Austin Aces on July 7, 2014. Somdev Devvarman opened the match with a 5–2 set win in men's singles over Andy Roddick. Vera Zvonareva beat Daniela Hantuchová, 5–3, in women's singles to cut the Aviators' lead to 8–7. Raven Klaasen and Květa Peschke followed with a 5–2 set win in mixed doubles over Roddick and Zvonareva to extend the Aviators' lead to 13–9. A 5–2 women's doubles set win by Hantuchová and Peschke over Eva Hrdinová and Zvonareva gave the Aviators an 18–11 lead heading to the final set. Devvarman and Klaasen dominated Roddick and Treat Huey, 5–0, in men's doubles to close out the match and give the Aviators a 23–11 victory.

=== Aviators snap Kastles' winning streak ===
In their seventh match of the season, the Aviators faced a major test on the road against the three-time defending WTT Champion Washington Kastles who were riding an 18-match regular-season and playoff winning streak. The Aviators proved themselves up to the task by taking four of the five sets and handing the Kastles their first loss of the season, 22–18. The Aviators got set wins from Somdev Devvarman (5–4 in men's singles), Daniela Hantuchová and Květa Peschke (5–3 in women's doubles), Hantuchová (5–2 over Martina Hingis in women's singles) and Devvarman and Raven Klaasen (5–4 in men's doubles). The Aviators improved their record to 5 wins and 2 losses with the victory.

=== Successful road trip ===
In their 11th match of the season, the Aviators completed a six-match road trip against the Austin Aces with a victory to give themselves a record of 4 wins and 2 losses on the trip. With just three home matches remaining after this one, this victory was the start of a four-match winning streak with which the Aviators ended the regular season. The Aviators won four of the five sets in this match led by Somdev Devvarman (5–4 over Andy Roddick in men's singles), Devvarman and Raven Klaasen (5–4 in men's doubles), Daniela Hantuchová and Květa Peschke (5–2 in women's doubles) and Hantuchová (5–3 in women's singles).

=== Clinching a postseason home match ===
On July 20, the Aviators defeated the Springfield Lasers, 21–15, to improve their record to 8 wins and 4 losses. The Aviators got set wins from Květa Peschke and Daniela Hantuchová (5–3 in women's doubles), Mike Bryan and Peschke (5–4 in mixed doubles), Hantuchová (5–3 in women's singles) and Bob and Mike Bryan (5–0 in men's doubles). Later that evening, the Aviators clinched a playoff berth and home-court advantage for the Western Conference Championship Match when the Austin Aces defeated the Texas Wild, 22–16.

=== Best record in WTT ===
In their final regular-season match, the Aviators defeated the Austin Aces, 22–12, at Valley View Casino Center to give them the best regular-season record in WTT in 2014. The Aviators and Washington Kastles both finished the season with 10 wins and 4 losses, but the Aviators won the only regular-season meeting between the teams, giving them a tiebreaker edge. The Aviators won four of the five sets in the match against the Aces and were led by Somdev Devvarman (5–0 in men's singles), Bob Bryan and Květa Peschke (5–2 in mixed doubles), Daniela Hantuchová (5–3 in women's singles) and Bob and Mike Bryan (5–2 in men's doubles). The first-place finish gave the Aviators the opportunity to host their first playoff game for the Western Conference championship.

=== Playoffs ===
The Aviators met the defending Western Conference Champion Springfield Lasers at Valley View Casino Center for the Western Conference title on July 24, 2014. Michael Russell got the Lasers started by winning a tiebreaker in the men's singles set against Somdev Devvarman. Květa Peschke and Daniela Hantuchová answered for the Aviators with a tiebreaker win of their own in women's doubles over Olga Govortsova and Līga Dekmeijere to tie the match, 9–9. Bob Bryan and Peschke gave the Aviators a 14–12 lead in the match with a 5–3 set win over Ross Hutchins and Govortsova in mixed doubles. Govortsova dominated Hantuchová, 5–0, to give the Lasers a 17–14 lead heading to the final set. Russell and Hutchins took the men's doubles from Bob and Mike Bryan, 5–3, to secure a 22–17 victory for the Lasers and the Western Conference Championship.

== Event chronology ==
- January 15, 2014: Claude Okin, CEO of the New York Sportimes announced that the franchise had been sold to businessman Russell Geyser and his minority partner Jack McGrory, and the team would be relocated to San Diego, California and renamed the San Diego Aviators. David Macpherson was hired as the team's coach.
- January 23, 2014: The Aviators acquired the rights to Bob and Mike Bryan in a trade with the Texas Wild in exchange for undisclosed financial consideration.
- February 11, 2014: The Aviators selected Bob and Mike Bryan as a protected doubles team pick in the first round of the WTT Marquee Player Draft and Daniela Hantuchová in the second round.
- March 11, 2014: The Aviators traded the first pick of the third round of the WTT Roster Player Draft (number 15 overall) to the Springfield Lasers in exchange for the sixth pick in the fourth round (number 27 overall) and financial consideration.
- March 11, 2014: The Aviators drafted Somdev Devvarman, Raven Klaasen and Květa Peschke (who was protected) in the WTT Roster Player Draft.
- July 7, 2014: The Aviators opened their season against the Austin Aces at the Valley View Casino Center in San Diego in the debut match for both teams after the relocations of their franchises. The Aviators defeated the Aces, 23–11.
- July 14, 2014: After opening the season with six consecutive victories, the Washington Kastles suffered their first defeat, losing at home to the Aviators, 22–18. Including the 2013 regular season and playoffs, the Kastles had won 18 in a row.
- July 20, 2014: The Aviators defeated the Springfield Lasers, 21–15, to improve their record to 8 wins and 4 losses. Later that evening, the Aviators clinched a playoff berth and home-court advantage for the Western Conference Championship Match when the Austin Aces defeated the Texas Wild, 22–16.
- July 23, 2014: The Aviators defeated the Austin Aces, 22–12, at Valley View Casino Center to give them the best regular-season record in WTT in 2014.
- July 24, 2014: In the first-ever playoff match for the Aviators since the franchise relocated from New York, the team hosted the defending Western Conference Champion Springfield Lasers. The Lasers got set wins from Michael Russell (5–4 in men's singles), Olga Govortsova (5–0 in women's singles) and Russell and Ross Hutchins (5–3 in men's doubles) on their way to a 22–17 victory and their second consecutive Western Conference Championship.
- July 26, 2014: WTT announced that Daniela Hantuchová had been named Female Most Valuable Player, Somdev Devvarman had been named Male Rookie of the Year and David Macpherson had been named Coach of the Year.

== Draft picks ==
Since the Sportimes had the worst record in WTT in 2013, the Aviators had the first selection in each round of both WTT drafts.

=== Marquee player draft ===
The Aviators acquired the rights to Bob and Mike Bryan in a trade with the Texas Wild in exchange for undisclosed financial consideration on January 23, 2014. This allowed the Aviators to protect and select the Bryan Brothers in the marquee player draft. The selections made by the Aviators are shown in the table below.

Round	No.	Overall	Player chosen	Prot?	Notes
1	1	1	Bob and Mike Bryan	Y	Doubles team
2	1	9	Daniela Hantuchová	N	

Daniela Hantuchová committed to playing full-time for the Aviators for the 2014 season.

=== Roster player draft ===
With Hantuchová committed to playing full-time, the Aviators knew they would not need all four of their draft choices. After making their first two selections, the third player they intended to pick was a protected player (Květa Peschke) which they could choose in the fourth round. This gave the Aviators a valuable third round draft pick which they could trade. The Springfield Lasers had their eyes on an unprotected player and were willing to deal for the Aviators' pick. The Aviators traded the first selection in the third round (15th overall) to the Lasers in exchange for the sixth selection in the fourth round (27th overall) and financial consideration. With the pick they acquired from the Aviators, the Lasers selected Michael Russell. The selections made by the Aviators are shown in the table below.

Round	No.	Overall	Player chosen	Prot?
1	1	1	Somdev Devvarman	N
2	1	8	Raven Klaasen	N
4	1	22	Květa Peschke	Y
4	6	27	Pass	–

== Match log ==
=== Regular season ===
Legend
Aviators Win	Aviators Loss
Home team in CAPS

Match	Date	Venue and location	Result and details	Record
1	July 7	Valley View Casino Center; San Diego, California	SAN DIEGO AVIATORS 23, Austin Aces 11 * MS: Somdev Devvarman (Aviators) 5, Andy Roddick (Aces) 2 * WS: Vera Zvonareva (Aces) 5, Daniela Hantuchová (Aviators) 3 * XD: Raven Klaasen/Květa Peschke (Aviators) 5, Andy Roddick/Vera Zvonareva (Aces) 2 *** Vera Zvonareva substituted for Eva Hrdinová at 2–4 * WD: Daniela Hantuchová/Květa Peschke (Aviators) 5, Eva Hrdinová/Vera Zvonareva (Aces) 2 * MD: Somdev Devvarman/Raven Klaasen (Aviators) 5, Andy Roddick/Treat Huey (Aces) 0	1–0
2	July 8	Valley View Casino Center; San Diego, California	SAN DIEGO AVIATORS 20, Philadelphia Freedoms 19 (super tiebreaker, 7–1) * MS: Somdev Devvarman (Aviators) 5, Frank Dancevic (Freedoms) 2 * WS: Taylor Townsend (Freedoms) 5, Daniela Hantuchová (Aviators) 2 * XD: Marcelo Melo/Liezel Huber (Freedoms) 5, Raven Klaasen/Květa Peschke (Aviators) 4 * WD: Květa Peschke/Daniela Hantuchová (Aviators) 5, Liezel Huber/Taylor Townsend (Freedoms) 1 * MD: Frank Dancevic/Marcelo Melo (Freedoms) 5, Raven Klaasen/Somdev Devvarman (Aviators) 3 * OT – MD: Frank Dancevic/Marcelo Melo (Freedoms) 1, Raven Klaasen/Somdev Devvarman (Aviators) 0 * STB – MD: Raven Klaasen/Somdev Devvarman (Aviators) 7, Frank Dancevic/Marcelo Melo (Freedoms) 1	2–0
3	July 9	Cedar Park Center; Cedar Park, Texas	AUSTIN ACES 20, San Diego Aviators 18 * MD: Somdev Devvarman/Raven Klaasen (Aviators) 5, Rick Leach/Andy Roddick (Aces) 2; ***Rick Leach substituted for Treat Huey at 2–2 * MS: Andy Roddick (Aces) 5, Somdev Devvarman (Aviators) 3 * XD: Květa Peschke/Raven Klaasen (Aviators) 5, Marion Bartoli/Andy Roddick (Aces) 3 * WD: Marion Bartoli/Vera Zvonareva (Aces) 5, Daniela Hantuchová/Květa Peschke (Aviators) 3 * WS: Vera Zvonareva (Aces) 5, Daniela Hantuchová (Aviators) 2	2–1
4	July 10	Valley View Casino Center; San Diego, California	Texas Wild 20, SAN DIEGO AVIATORS 19 (super tiebreaker, 7–6) * MS: Alex Bogomolov, Jr. (Wild) 5, Somdev Devvarman (Aviators) 3 * WS: Daniela Hantuchová (Aviators) 5, Anabel Medina Garrigues (Wild) 2 * XD: Květa Peschke/Raven Klaasen (Aviators) 5, Anabel Medina Garrigues/Aisam Qureshi (Wild) 4 * WD: Daniela Hantuchová/Květa Peschke (Aviators) 5, Darija Jurak/Anabel Medina Garrigues (Wild) 3 * MD: Alex Bogomolov, Jr./Aisam Qureshi (Wild) 5, Somdev Devvarman/Raven Klaasen (Aviators) 1 * STB – MD: Alex Bogomolov, Jr./Aisam Qureshi (Wild) 7, Somdev Devvarman/Raven Klaasen (Aviators) 6	2–2
5	July 12	Valley View Casino Center; San Diego, California	SAN DIEGO AVIATORS 21, Boston Lobsters 19 (overtime) * MS: Rik de Voest (Lobsters) 5, Somdev Devvarman (Aviators) 3 * WS: Coco Vandeweghe (Lobsters) 5, Daniela Hantuchová (Aviators) 4 * MD: Somdev Devvarman/Raven Klaasen (Aviators) 5, Eric Butorac/Rik de Voest (Lobsters) 3 * WD: Daniela Hantuchová/Květa Peschke (Aviators) 5, Megan Moulton-Levy/Coco Vandeweghe (Lobsters) 1 * XD: Megan Moulton-Levy/Eric Butorac (Lobsters) 5, Květa Peschke/Raven Klaasen (Aviators) 3 * OT – XD: Květa Peschke/Raven Klaasen (Aviators) 1, Megan Moulton-Levy/Eric Butorac (Lobsters) 0	3–2
6	July 13	Four Seasons Resort and Club Dallas at Las Colinas; Irving, Texas	San Diego Aviators 21, TEXAS WILD 18 * XD: Anabel Medina Garrigues/Aisam Qureshi (Wild) 5, Květa Peschke/Raven Klaasen (Aviators) 3 * WD: Darija Jurak/Anabel Medina Garrigues (Wild) 5, Daniela Hantuchová/Květa Peschke (Aviators) 3 * MS: Somdev Devvarman (Aviators) 5, Aisam Qureshi (Wild) 3 *** Aisam Qureshi substituted for Alex Bogomolov, Jr. at 3–3 * WS: Daniela Hantuchová (Aviators) 5, Anabel Medina Garrigues (Wild) 1 * MD: Somdev Devvarman/Raven Klaasen (Aviators) 5, Alex Bogomolov, Jr./Aisam Qureshi (Wild) 4	4–2
7	July 14	Kastles Stadium at the Charles E. Smith Center; Washington, District of Columbia	San Diego Aviators 22, WASHINGTON KASTLES 18 * MS: Somdev Devvarman (Aviators) 5, Bobby Reynolds (Kastles) 4 * WD: Daniela Hantuchová/Květa Peschke (Aviators) 5, Anastasia Rodionova/Martina Hingis (Kastles) 3 * XD: Martina Hingis/Leander Paes (Kastles) 5, Květa Peschke/Raven Klaasen (Aviators) 2 * WS: Daniela Hantuchová (Aviators) 5, Martina Hingis (Kastles) 2 * MD: Somdev Devvarman/Raven Klaasen (Aviators) 5, Bobby Reynolds/Leander Paes (Kastles) 4	5–2
8	July 15	The Pavilion; Radnor Township, Pennsylvania	PHILADELPHIA FREEDOMS 19, San Diego Aviators 18 * MD: Somdev Devvarman/Raven Klaasen (Aviators) 5, Frank Dancevic/Marcelo Melo (Freedoms) 3 * WD: Daniela Hantuchová/Květa Peschke (Aviators) 5, Victoria Azarenka/Liezel Huber (Freedoms) 1 * MS: Frank Dancevic (Freedoms) 5, Somdev Devvarman (Aviators) 2 * WS: Victoria Azarenka (Freedoms) 5, Daniela Hantuchová (Aviators) 3 * XD: Victoria Azarenka/Marcelo Melo (Freedoms) 5, Květa Peschke/Raven Klaasen (Aviators) 3	5–3
9	July 16	Boston Lobsters Tennis Center at the Manchester Athletic Club; Manchester-by-the-Sea, Massachusetts	San Diego Aviators 20, BOSTON LOBSTERS 15 (overtime) * MS: Rik de Voest (Lobsters) 5, Somdev Devvarman (Aviators) 2 * WD: Daniela Hantuchová/Květa Peschke (Aviators) 5, Sharon Fichman/Megan Moulton-Levy (Lobsters) 3 * MD: Somdev Devvarman/Raven Klaasen (Aviators) 5, Eric Butorac/Rik de Voest (Lobsters) 2 * WS: Daniela Hantuchová (Aviators) 5, Sharon Fichman (Lobsters) 0 * XD: Sharon Fichman/Eric Butorac (Lobsters) 5, Raven Klaasen/Květa Peschke (Aviators) 2 * OT – XD: Raven Klaasen/Květa Peschke (Aviators) 1, Sharon Fichman/Eric Butorac (Lobsters) 0	6–3
10	July 17	Mediacom Stadium at Cooper Tennis Complex; Springfield, Missouri	SPRINGFIELD LASERS 19, San Diego Aviators 18 (super tiebreaker, 7–2) * MD: Ross Hutchins/Michael Russell (Lasers) 5, Raven Klaasen/Somdev Devvarman (Aviators) 2 * WD: Daniela Hantuchová/Květa Peschke (Aviators) 5, Olga Govortsova/Raquel Kops-Jones (Lasers) 0 * XD: Raven Klaasen/Květa Peschke (Aviators) 5, Ross Hutchins/Olga Govortsova (Lasers) 3; ***Olga Govortsova substituted for Raquel Kops-Jones at 1–2 * WS: Olga Govortsova (Lasers) 5, Daniela Hantuchová (Aviators) 3 * MS: Michael Russell (Lasers) 5, Somdev Devvarman (Aviators) 3 * STB – MS: Michael Russell (Lasers) 7, Somdev Devvarman (Aviators) 2	6–4
11	July 19	Cedar Park Center; Cedar Park, Texas	San Diego Aviators 22, AUSTIN ACES 18 * MS: Somdev Devvarman (Aviators) 5, Andy Roddick (Aces) 4 * MD: Somdev Devvarman/Raven Klaasen (Aviators) 5, Treat Huey/Andy Roddick (Aces) 4 * XD: Vera Zvonareva/Treat Huey (Aces) 5, Květa Peschke/Raven Klaasen (Aviators) 2 * WD: Daniela Hantuchová/Květa Peschke (Aviators) 5, Marion Bartoli/Vera Zvonareva (Aces) 2 * WS: Daniela Hantuchová (Aviators) 5, Vera Zvonareva (Aces) 3	7–4
12	July 20	Valley View Casino Center; San Diego, California	SAN DIEGO AVIATORS 21, Springfield Lasers 15 * MS: Michael Russell (Lasers) 5, Somdev Devvarman (Aviators) 1 * WD: Květa Peschke/Daniela Hantuchová (Aviators) 5, Olga Govortsova/Abigail Spears (Lasers) 3 * XD: Mike Bryan/Květa Peschke (Aviators) 5, Ross Hutchins/Abigail Spears (Lasers) 4 * WS: Daniela Hantuchová (Aviators) 5, Olga Govortsova (Lasers) 3 * MD: Bob Bryan/Mike Bryan (Aviators) 5, Ross Hutchins/Michael Russell (Lasers) 0	8–4
13	July 22	Valley View Casino Center; San Diego, California	SAN DIEGO AVIATORS 22, Texas Wild 13 * MS: Somdev Devvarman (Aviators) 5, Alex Bogomolov, Jr. (Wild) 2 * WD: Anabel Medina Garrigues/Darija Jurak (Wild) 5, Daniela Hantuchová/Květa Peschke (Aviators) 2 * XD: Mike Bryan/Květa Peschke (Aviators) 5, Aisam Qureshi/Anabel Medina Garrigues (Wild) 3 * WS: Daniela Hantuchová (Aviators) 5, Anabel Medina Garrigues (Wild) 1 * MD: Bob Bryan/Mike Bryan (Aviators) 5, Alex Bogomolov, Jr./Aisam Qureshi (Wild) 2	9–4
14	July 23	Valley View Casino Center; San Diego, California	SAN DIEGO AVIATORS 22, Austin Aces 12 * MS: Somdev Devvarman (Aviators) 5, Jason Jung (Aces) 0 * WD: Eva Hrdinová/Varvara Lepchenko (Aces) 5, Květa Peschke/Daniela Hantuchová (Aviators) 2 * XD: Bob Bryan/Květa Peschke (Aviators) 5, Treat Huey/Eva Hrdinová (Aces) 2 * WS: Daniela Hantuchová (Aviators) 5, Varvara Lepchenko (Aces) 3 * MD: Bob Bryan/Mike Bryan (Aviators) 5, Jason Jung/Treat Huey (Aces) 2	10–4

=== Playoffs ===
Legend
Aviators Win	Aviators Loss
Home team in CAPS

Western Conference Championship Match

Date	Venue and location	Result and details
July 24	Valley View Casino Center; San Diego, California	Springfield Lasers 22, SAN DIEGO AVIATORS 17 * MS: Michael Russell (Lasers) 5, Somdev Devvarman (Aviators) 4 * WD: Květa Peschke/Daniela Hantuchová (Aviators) 5, Olga Govortsova/Līga Dekmeijere (Lasers) 4 * XD: Bob Bryan/Květa Peschke (Aviators) 5, Ross Hutchins/Olga Govortsova (Lasers) 3 * WS: Olga Govortsova (Lasers) 5, Daniela Hantuchová (Aviators) 0 * MD: Michael Russell/Ross Hutchins (Lasers) 5, Bob Bryan/Mike Bryan (Aviators) 3

== Team personnel ==
=== Players and coaches ===
- (Australia) David Macpherson, Coach
- (Australia) Ashley Fisher, Assistant Coach
- (United States) Bob Bryan
- (United States) Mike Bryan
- (India) Somdev Devvarman
- (Slovakia) Daniela Hantuchová
- (South Africa) Raven Klaasen
- (Czech Republic) Květa Peschke

=== Front office ===
- (United States) Russell Geyser, Principal Owner
- (United States) Jack McGrory, Minority Owner
- (United States) Fred Luddy, Minority Owner
- (United States) Billy Berger, CEO
- (United States) Shelly Hall, General Manager

== Statistics ==
Players are listed in order of their game-winning percentage provided they played in at least 40% of the Aviators' games in that event, which is the WTT minimum for qualification for league leaders in individual statistical categories.

Men's singles – regular season

Player	GP	GW	GL	PCT	A	DF	BPW	BPP	BP%	3APW	3APP	3AP%
Somdev Devvarman	105	52	53	.495	9	10	18	43	.419	14	30	.467
Total	105	52	53	.495	9	10	18	43	.419	14	30	.467

Women's singles – regular season

Player	GP	GW	GL	PCT	A	DF	BPW	BPP	BP%	3APW	3APP	3AP%
Daniela Hantuchová	102	57	45	.559	6	16	17	33	.515	22	31	.710
Total	102	57	45	.559	6	16	17	33	.515	22	31	.710

Men's doubles – regular season

Player	GP	GW	GL	PCT	A	DF	BPW	BPP	BP%	3APW	3APP	3AP%
Somdev Devvarman	86	47	39	.547	6	3	11	27	.407	15	26	.577
Raven Klaasen	86	47	39	.547	3	8	11	27	.407	15	26	.577
Bob Bryan	19	15	4	.789	1	0	4	12	.333	4	7	.571
Mike Bryan	19	15	4	.789	0	0	4	12	.333	4	7	.571
Total	105	62	43	.590	10	11	15	39	.385	19	33	.576

Women's doubles – regular season

Player	GP	GW	GL	PCT	A	DF	BPW	BPP	BP%	3APW	3APP	3AP%
Daniela Hantuchová	99	60	39	.606	3	5	23	52	.442	12	26	.462
Květa Peschke	99	60	39	.606	1	8	23	52	.442	12	26	.462
Total	99	60	39	.606	4	13	23	52	.442	12	26	.462

Mixed doubles – regular season

Player	GP	GW	GL	PCT	A	DF	BPW	BPP	BP%	3APW	3APP	3AP%
Květa Peschke	112	56	56	.500	1	9	13	30	.433	16	30	.533
Raven Klaasen	88	41	47	.466	8	3	9	20	.450	11	23	.478
Bob Bryan	7	5	2	.714	1	0	1	2	.500	3	3	1.000
Mike Bryan	17	10	7	.588	2	0	3	8	.375	2	4	.500
Total	112	56	56	.500	12	12	13	30	.433	16	30	.533

Team totals – regular season

Event	GP	GW	GL	PCT	A	DF	BPW	BPP	BP%	3APW	3APP	3AP%
Men's singles	105	52	53	.495	9	10	18	43	.419	14	30	.467
Women's singles	102	57	45	.559	6	16	17	33	.515	22	31	.710
Men's doubles	105	62	43	.590	10	11	15	39	.385	19	33	.576
Women's doubles	99	60	39	.606	4	13	23	52	.442	12	26	.462
Mixed doubles	112	56	56	.500	12	12	13	30	.433	16	30	.533
Total	523	287	236	.549	41	62	86	197	.437	83	150	.553

Men's singles – playoffs

Player	GP	GW	GL	PCT	A	DF	BPW	BPP	BP%	3APW	3APP	3AP%
Somdev Devvarman	9	4	5	.444	4	1	0	4	.000	1	3	.333
Total	9	4	5	.444	4	1	0	4	.000	1	3	.333

Women's singles – playoffs

Player	GP	GW	GL	PCT	A	DF	BPW	BPP	BP%	3APW	3APP	3AP%
Daniela Hantuchová	5	0	5	.000	0	0	0	1	.000	0	3	.000
Total	5	0	5	.000	0	0	0	1	.000	0	3	.000

Men's doubles – playoffs

Player	GP	GW	GL	PCT	A	DF	BPW	BPP	BP%	3APW	3APP	3AP%
Bob Bryan	8	3	5	.375	0	1	0	0	–	0	0	–
Mike Bryan	8	3	5	.375	2	0	0	0	–	0	0	–
Total	8	3	5	.375	2	1	0	0	–	0	0	–

Women's doubles – playoffs

Player	GP	GW	GL	PCT	A	DF	BPW	BPP	BP%	3APW	3APP	3AP%
Daniela Hantuchová	9	5	4	.556	0	1	3	3	1.000	0	0	–
Květa Peschke	9	5	4	.556	0	0	3	3	1.000	0	0	–
Total	9	5	4	.556	0	1	3	3	1.000	0	0	–

Mixed doubles – playoffs

Player	GP	GW	GL	PCT	A	DF	BPW	BPP	BP%	3APW	3APP	3AP%
Bob Bryan	8	5	3	.625	0	1	3	4	.750	0	0	–
Květa Peschke	8	5	3	.625	0	0	3	4	.750	0	0	–
Total	8	5	3	.625	0	1	3	4	.750	0	0	–

Team totals – playoffs

Event	GP	GW	GL	PCT	A	DF	BPW	BPP	BP%	3APW	3APP	3AP%
Men's singles	9	4	5	.444	4	1	0	4	.000	1	3	.333
Women's singles	5	0	5	.000	0	0	0	1	.000	0	3	.000
Men's doubles	8	3	5	.375	2	1	0	0	–	0	0	–
Women's doubles	9	5	4	.556	0	1	3	3	1.000	0	0	–
Mixed doubles	8	5	3	.625	0	1	3	4	.750	0	0	–
Total	39	17	22	.436	6	4	6	12	.500	1	6	.167

Men's singles – all matches

Player	GP	GW	GL	PCT	A	DF	BPW	BPP	BP%	3APW	3APP	3AP%
Somdev Devvarman	114	56	58	.491	13	11	18	47	.383	15	33	.455
Total	114	56	58	.491	13	11	18	47	.383	15	33	.455

Women's singles – all matches

Player	GP	GW	GL	PCT	A	DF	BPW	BPP	BP%	3APW	3APP	3AP%
Daniela Hantuchová	107	57	50	.533	6	16	17	34	.500	22	34	.647
Total	107	57	50	.533	6	16	17	34	.500	22	34	.647

Men's doubles – all matches

Player	GP	GW	GL	PCT	A	DF	BPW	BPP	BP%	3APW	3APP	3AP%
Somdev Devvarman	86	47	39	.547	6	3	11	27	.407	15	26	.577
Raven Klaasen	86	47	39	.547	3	8	11	27	.407	15	26	.577
Bob Bryan	27	18	9	.667	1	1	4	12	.333	4	7	.571
Mike Bryan	27	18	9	.667	2	0	4	12	.333	4	7	.571
Total	113	65	48	.575	12	12	15	39	.385	19	33	.576

Women's doubles – all matches

Player	GP	GW	GL	PCT	A	DF	BPW	BPP	BP%	3APW	3APP	3AP%
Daniela Hantuchová	108	65	43	.602	3	6	26	55	.473	12	26	.462
Květa Peschke	108	65	43	.602	1	8	26	55	.473	12	26	.462
Total	108	65	43	.602	4	14	26	55	.473	12	26	.462

Mixed doubles – all matches

Player	GP	GW	GL	PCT	A	DF	BPW	BPP	BP%	3APW	3APP	3AP%
Květa Peschke	120	61	59	.508	1	9	16	34	.471	16	30	.533
Raven Klaasen	88	41	47	.466	8	3	9	20	.450	11	23	.478
Bob Bryan	15	10	5	.667	1	1	4	6	.667	3	3	1.000
Mike Bryan	17	10	7	.588	2	0	3	8	.375	2	4	.500
Total	120	61	59	.508	12	13	16	34	.471	16	30	.533

Team totals – all matches

Event	GP	GW	GL	PCT	A	DF	BPW	BPP	BP%	3APW	3APP	3AP%
Men's singles	114	56	58	.491	13	11	18	47	.383	15	33	.455
Women's singles	107	57	50	.533	6	16	17	34	.500	22	34	.647
Men's doubles	113	65	48	.575	12	12	15	39	.385	19	33	.576
Women's doubles	108	65	43	.602	4	14	26	55	.473	12	26	.462
Mixed doubles	120	61	59	.508	12	13	16	34	.471	16	30	.533
Total	562	304	258	.541	47	66	92	209	.440	84	156	.538

== Transactions ==
- January 23, 2014: The Aviators acquired the rights to Bob and Mike Bryan from the Texas Wild in exchange for undisclosed financial consideration.
- February 11, 2014: The Aviators selected Bob and Mike Bryan (who were protected) along with Daniela Hantuchová in the WTT Marquee Player Draft.
- March 11, 2014: The Aviators traded the first pick of the third round of the WTT roster draft (number 15 overall) to the Springfield Lasers in exchange for the sixth pick in the fourth round (number 27 overall) and financial consideration. The Lasers used the selection they acquired in the trade to draft Michael Russell. The Aviators passed on using the selection they acquired in the trade.
- March 11, 2014: The Aviators selected Květa Peschke (who was protected) along with Somdev Devvarman and Raven Klaasen in the WTT Roster Player Draft.
- March 11, 2014: The Aviators left Anna-Lena Grönefeld, Robert Kendrick and Jesse Witten unprotected in the roster player draft. Grönefeld was drafted in the first round by the Springfield Lasers who traded up to select her. The remaining unprotected players effectively became free agents.
- March 26, 2014: The Aviators left John McEnroe unprotected at the expiration of the wildcard player protection window effectively making him a free agent.

== Individual honors and achievements ==
The following table shows individual honors bestowed upon players and coaches of the San Diego Aviators in 2014.

Player/Coach	Award
Daniela Hantuchová	Female Most Valuable Player
Somdev Devvarman	Male Rookie of the Year
David Macpherson	Coach of the Year

Somdev Devvarman and Raven Klaasen finished tied for the best regular-season winning percentage in men's doubles in WTT.

Daniela Hantuchová was second in regular-season winning percentage in women's singles.

Hantuchová and Květa Peschke were tied for the third best winning percentage in women's doubles.

== Charitable support ==
During each night of the 2014 season, the WTT team with the most aces received US$1,000 toward a local charity of the team's choice as part of a program called Mylan Aces. In the case of a tie, the award was split accordingly. The Aviators earned $500 for the Greater San Diego and Desert Area Chapter of the Crohn's & Colitis Foundation of America through the program.
