= 2011 World TeamTennis season =

- Duration: July 4, 2011 – July 21, 2011
- Eastern Conference Champions champions: Washington Kastles
- Western Conference Champions champions: St. Louis Aces

WTT Finals
- Date: July 24th, 2011
- Venue: Charleston, SC
- Champions: Washington Kastles

Seasons
- 2010 2012

The 2011 World TeamTennis season was the 36th season of the top professional tennis league in the United States. Before the start of the 2011 season, the New York Buzz and the New York Sportimes merged into one New York team, the NY Sportimes.

The Washington Kastles won the WTT title and became the first team in league history to complete a perfect season.

== Competition format ==
The 2011 World TeamTennis season included 9 teams, split into two conferences (Eastern and Western). The Eastern Conference had 4 teams, while the Western Conference 5 teams. Each team played a 14 match regular season schedule, with 7 home and 7 away matches. World TeamTennis’s playoff format consisted of the top two teams in each conference playing a semifinal on either July 22 (Eastern Conference) or July 23 (Western Conference), and the winners of each match playing in the final on July 24, 2011.

== Standings ==
- As of July 22, 2011

Eastern Conference
Pos	Team	MP	W	L	Perc	MB	GW	GL
1	Washington Kastles	14	14	0	1.000	-	311	232
2	Boston Lobsters	14	7	7	0.500	7	253	286
3	New York Sportimes	14	7	7	0.500	7	258	265
4	Philadelphia Freedoms	14	3	11	0.214	11	231	302

2011 Eastern Conference Playoffs

Western Conference
Pos	Team	MP	W	L	Perc	MB	GW	GL
1	Sacramento Capitals	14	8	6	0.571	-	269	249
2	St. Louis Aces	14	8	6	0.571	0	287	232
3	Kansas City Explorers	14	8	6	0.571	0	269	248
4	Newport Beach Breakers	14	4	10	0.285	4	240	280
5	Springfield Lasers	14	4	10	0.285	4	254	278

2011 Western Conference Playoffs

== Results table ==
Abbreviation and Color Key: Boston Lobsters - BOS • Kansas City Explorers - KAN • Newport Beach Breakers - NPB • New York Sportimes - NYS Philadelphia Freedoms - PHI • Sacramento Capitals - SAC • Springfield Lasers - SPR • St. Louis Aces - STL • Washington Kastles - WAS Win • Loss • Home • Away
Team	Match													
Team	1	2	3	4	5	6	7	8	9	10	11	12	13	14
Boston Lobsters	NYS	NYS	WAS	PHI	KAN	PHI	SPR	SPR	STL	PHI	WAS	STL	SAC	NPB
Boston Lobsters	25-16	16-21	10-25	22-16	8-25	23-15	24-19	17-23	13-25	22-17	18-25	11-24	22-21	22-14
Kansas City Explorers	WAS	SAC	NPB	SPR	BOS	SAC	NPB	SAC	NYS	SPR	NYS	PHI	STL	STL
Kansas City Explorers	18-21	16-23	14-23	21-17	25-8	12-23	23-17	20-15	25-7	21-13	18-24	21-17	20-17	15-23
Newport Beach Breakers	STL	SPR	STL	KAN	NYS	SAC	WAS	KAN	SAC	SAC	PHI	STL	SPR	BOS
Newport Beach Breakers	19-18	20-19	20-21	23-14	17-19	19-22	13-21	17-23	18-19	11-22	16-25	11-21	21-14	14-22
New York Sportimes	BOS	BOS	PHI	SAC	NPB	STL	WAS	PHI	PHI	SPR	KAN	KAN	WAS	WAS
New York Sportimes	16-25	21-16	23-13	21-12	19-17	16-15	19-20	21-19	19-21	17-20	7-25	24-18	20-21	15-23
Philadelphia Freedoms	SPR	WAS	NYS	BOS	STL	BOS	STL	NYS	NYS	BOS	SPR	NPB	KAN	WAS
Philadelphia Freedoms	13-24	18-19	13-23	16-22	11-25	15-23	22-17	19-21	21-19	17-22	13-25	25-16	17-21	11-25
Sacramento Capitals	STL	KAN	NYS	WAS	NPB	KAN	STL	KAN	NPB	NPB	WAS	SPR	BOS	SPR
Sacramento Capitals	16-21	23-16	12-21	16-21	22-19	23-12	20-19	15-20	19-18	22-11	14-25	25-7	21-22	21-17
Springfield Lasers	PHI	NPB	WAS	KAN	STL	BOS	BOS	WAS	NYS	PHI	KAN	SAC	NPB	SAC
Springfield Lasers	24-13	19-20	20-23	17-21	16-21	19-24	23-17	20-21	22-17	25-13	13-21	7-25	14-21	17-21
St. Louis Aces	NPB	SAC	NPB	PHI	SPR	NYS	PHI	SAC	BOS	WAS	BOS	NPB	KAN	KAN
St. Louis Aces	18-19	21-16	21-20	25-11	21-16	15-16	17-22	19-20	25-13	20-21	24-11	21-11	17-20	23-15
Washington Kastles	KAN	PHI	BOS	SPR	SAC	NPB	NYS	SPR	STL	BOS	SAC	NYS	NYS	PHI
Washington Kastles	21-18	19-18	25-10	23-20	21-16	21-13	20-19	21-20	21-20	25-18	25-14	21-20	23-15	25-11

== Playoffs ==
Conference Championships
1	Washington Kastles	23
2	Boston Lobsters	15
1	St. Louis Aces	20
2	Sacramento Capitals	19

WTT Finals
Washington Kastles	23
St. Louis Aces	19
