= 2010 World TeamTennis season =

- Duration: July 5th, 2010 – July 22nd, 2010
- Eastern Conference Champions champions: New York Sportimes
- Western Conference Champions champions: Kansas City Explorers
- Date: July 24th, 2010
- Finals venue: Kansas City, Missouri
- Finals champions: Kansas City Explorers

Seasons
- 2009 2011

The 2010 World TeamTennis season was the 35th season of the top professional tennis league in the United States.

== Competition format ==
The 2010 World TeamTennis season included 10 teams, split into two conferences (Eastern and Western) playing a 14 match regular season schedule, with 7 home and 7 away matches. WTT’s playoff format consisted of the top two teams in each conference playing a semifinal on July 23, and the winners of each match playing in the final on July 24, 2010.

== Standings ==
Eastern Conference
Pos	Team	MP	W	L	Perc	MB	GW	GL
1	New York Sportimes	14	9	5	0.643	-	316	311
2	Boston Lobsters	14	8	6	0.571	1	298	278
3	Washington Kastles	14	8	6	0.571	1	281	267
4	Philadelphia Freedoms	14	6	8	0.429	3	281	283
5	New York Buzz	14	2	12	0.143	7	225	301

2010 Eastern Conference Playoffs

Western Conference
Pos	Team	MP	W	L	Perc	MB	GW	GL
1	Springfield Lasers	14	10	4	0.714	-	310	267
2	Kansas City Explorers	14	9	5	0.643	1	336	292
3	St. Louis Aces	14	7	7	0.500	3	271	269
4	Sacramento Capitals	14	6	8	0.429	4	275	275
5	Newport Beach Breakers	14	5	9	0.357	5	248	298

2010 Western Conference Playoffs

== Results table ==
Abbreviation and Color Key: Boston Lobsters - BOS • Kansas City Explorers - KAN • Newport Beach Breakers - NPB • New York Buzz - NYB • New York Sportimes - NYS Philadelphia Freedoms - PHI • Sacramento Capitals - SAC • Springfield Lasers - SPR • St. Louis Aces - STL • Washington Kastles - WAS Win • Loss • Home
Team	Match													
Team	1	2	3	4	5	6	7	8	9	10	11	12	13	14
Boston Lobsters	KAN	NYS	NYS	STL	NYB	PHI	SPR	NYB	PHI	NYS	WAS	STL	NYB	WAS
Boston Lobsters	17-22	22-15	20-21	18-24	20-16	17-24	19-22	18-17	17-24	19-18	20-16	25-13	25-9	24-15
Kansas City Explorers	BOS	SPR	SAC	NPB	NPB	STL	WAS	SPR	NPB	STL	SAC	NPB	SAC	PHI
Kansas City Explorers	22-17	16-23	18-21	25-15	22-20	18-22	24-22	22-13	25-11	18-22	23-17	18-19	22-16	22-19
Newport Beach Breakers	SAC	SAC	KAN	KAN	SPR	SAC	SAC	STL	KAN	STL	SPR	KAN	SPR	NYS
Newport Beach Breakers	24-16	20-18	15-25	20-22	23-19	18-25	14-24	16-14	11-25	15-21	13-25	19-18	18-23	22-23
New York Buzz	PHI	NYS	WAS	WAS	BOS	WAS	NYS	BOS	PHI	SPR	NYS	BOS	PHI	STL
New York Buzz	20-21	16-22	15-25	12-20	16-20	20-21	23-15	17-18	22-18	11-25	17-22	9-25	17-24	10-25
New York Sportimes	WAS	NYB	BOS	BOS	PHI	PHI	SPR	NYB	PHI	WAS	BOS	NYB	WAS	NPB
New York Sportimes	21-20	22-16	15-22	21-20	24-17	24-15	23-12	15-23	20-19	23-18	18-19	22-17	16-22	23-22
Philadelphia Freedoms	NYB	WAS	WAS	NYS	NYS	BOS	WAS	NYS	BOS	NYB	SAC	STL	NYB	KAN
Philadelphia Freedoms	21-20	15-21	20-21	17-24	15-24	24-17	24-18	19-20	24-17	18-22	19-23	22-17	24-17	19-22
Sacramento Capitals	NPB	NPB	STL	KAN	SPR	NPB	NPB	STL	SPR	PHI	KAN	SPR	KAN	SPR
Sacramento Capitals	16-24	18-20	20-21	21-18	23-10	25-18	24-14	22-19	14-21	23-19	17-23	17-24	16-22	19-22
Springfield Lasers	STL	STL	KAN	SAC	NYB	NYS	BOS	KAN	SAC	NYB	NPB	SAC	NYB	SAC
Springfield Lasers	21-22	22-18	23-16	10-23	19-23	23-12	22-19	13-22	21-14	25-11	25-13	24-17	23-18	22-19
St. Louis Aces	SPR	SPR	SAC	BOS	WAS	KAN	SAC	NPB	NPB	KAN	BOS	PHI	WAS	NYB
St. Louis Aces	22-21	18-22	21-20	20-12	16-23	22-18	19-22	14-16	21-15	22-18	13-25	17-22	17-19	25-10
Washington Kastles	NYS	PHI	NYB	PHI	NYB	STL	NYB	PHI	KAN	NYS	BOS	NYS	STL	BOS
Washington Kastles	20-21	21-15	25-15	21-20	20-12	23-16	21-20	18-24	22-24	18-23	16-20	22-16	19-17	15-24

== Playoffs ==
Conference Championships
1	New York Sportimes	22
2	Boston Lobsters	17
1	Springfield Lasers	17
2	Kansas City Explorers	20

WTT Finals
New York Sportimes	18
Kansas City Explorers	21

Source-
