= 2014 World TeamTennis season =

Tennis league season

- Duration: July 7 – 23, 2014
- Eastern Conference Champions champions: Washington Kastles
- Western Conference Champions champions: Springfield Lasers

WTT Final – King Trophy
- Date: July 27, 2014
- Venue: Springfield, Missouri
- Champions: Washington Kastles

WTT seasons seasons
- 2013 2015

The 2014 World TeamTennis season was the 39th season of the top professional team tennis league in the United States. Pursuant to a sponsorship agreement with Mylan N.V., the official name of the league was Mylan World TeamTennis in 2014. The Washington Kastles defeated the Springfield Lasers in the WTT Final to win their fourth consecutive King Trophy.

== Competition format ==
The 2014 World TeamTennis season included seven teams split into two conferences (Eastern and Western). The Eastern Conference had three teams and the Western Conference had four teams. Each team played a 14-match regular-season schedule with seven home and seven away matches. The top two teams in each conference qualified for the conference championship matches hosted by the first-place finishers. The conference champions met in the World TeamTennis Final hosted in 2014, by the Western Conference champion. An Eastern Conference champion that is a higher seed than a Western Conference champion is treated as the "home" team and has the right to determine order of play. The winner of the WTT Final is awarded the King Trophy.

== Franchise movement and contraction ==
On November 21, 2013, WTT announced that entrepreneur Lorne Abony had purchased the Orange County Breakers and relocated the team to Cedar Park, Texas, renaming it the Austin Aces. Immediately after the transaction, the Aces acquired the rights to Austin's hometown hero Andy Roddick in a trade with the Springfield Lasers in exchange for financial consideration. The team remains in the Western Conference.

On January 6, 2014, WTT announced that San Diego businessman Russell Geyser had purchased the New York Sportimes and relocated the team, renaming it the San Diego Aviators. The team was moved by WTT from the Eastern Conference to the Western Conference.

On February 4, 2014, after 28 years in Sacramento, the Sacramento Capitals announced the team was moving to Las Vegas for the 2014 season and would be renamed the Las Vegas Neon. The Capitals cited dissatisfaction with the team's stadium, a temporary facility on the parking lot of a mall. Management made plans for the team to play the 2014 season in the Darling Tennis Center, a permanent 3,000-seat stadium about 11 miles west of the Las Vegas Strip in the Summerlin community within the Las Vegas city limits. On February 20, Neon principal owner Deepal Wannakuwatte was arrested on federal fraud charges. The assets of his Sacramento-based medical supply company, International Manufacturing Group Inc., were frozen by a federal judge. Wannakuwatte's family had owned the Capitals/Neon franchise since 2011. International Manufacturing Group Inc. was the parent company of Capital Sports Management LLC which was the legal owner of the Neon. With the assets frozen, Neon ownership was unable to meet its financial obligations to the WTT, and on March 5, the league contracted the franchise.

With the Sportimes moving from New York and becoming the San Diego Aviators and changing conferences, WTT had originally planned to move the Springfield Lasers from the Western Conference to the Eastern Conference and have four teams in each conference. After the contraction of the Las Vegas Neon, WTT decided to keep the Lasers in the Western Conference.

== Drafts ==
=== Marquee player draft ===
The 2014 World TeamTennis Marquee Player Draft was conducted in New York City on February 11, 2014. The order in which teams selected was based on the results the teams achieved in 2013 with weaker teams selecting earlier and stronger teams selecting later. The order for relocated franchises was based on the results achieved in their previous city. Teams could protect up to two marquee players or doubles teams to which they held the rights from the previous season or acquired in a trade. These protected players could not be chosen by other teams unless the team protecting them failed to choose them in the draft. Rights to marquee players can be traded from one team to another before or during the draft, and the acquiring team may protect and then select those players. The selections made are shown in the tables below.

First round

No.	Team	Player chosen	Prot?	Notes
1	San Diego Aviators	Bob and Mike Bryan	Y	Doubles team
2	Philadelphia Freedoms	Victoria Azarenka	N	
3	Las Vegas Neon	Pass	-	
4	Austin Aces	Andy Roddick	Y	
5	Boston Lobsters	Pass	-	
6	Texas Wild	Pass	-	
7	Springfield Lasers	James Blake	Y	
8	Washington Kastles	Martina Hingis	Y	

Second round

No.	Team	Player chosen	Prot?	Notes
1	San Diego Aviators	Daniela Hantuchová	N	
2	Philadelphia Freedoms	Pass	-	
3	Las Vegas Neon	Sam Querrey	Y	
4	Austin Aces	Marion Bartoli	N	
5	Boston Lobsters	Pass	-	
6	Texas Wild	Pass	-	
7	Springfield Lasers	Pass	-	
8	Washington Kastles	Venus Williams	Y	

=== Roster player draft ===
The 2014 World TeamTennis Roster Player Draft was conducted in Indian Wells, California on March 11, 2014. The order in which teams selected was based on the results the teams achieved in 2013 with weaker teams selecting earlier and stronger teams selecting later. The order for relocated franchises was based on the results achieved in their previous city. Teams could protect up to four players to which they held the rights from the previous season or acquired in a trade. These protected players could not be chosen by other teams unless the team protecting them failed to choose them in the draft. Rights to roster players can be traded from one team to another before or during the draft, and the acquiring team may protect and then select those players. In addition, the rights to make a selection in a particular position within the draft can be traded from one team to another. The selections made are shown in the tables below.

First round

No.	Team	Player chosen	Prot?
1	San Diego Aviators	Somdev Devvarman	N
2	Philadelphia Freedoms	Victoria Duval	Y
3	Austin Aces	Vera Zvonareva	N
4	Boston Lobsters	Sharon Fichman	N
5	Texas Wild	Anabel Medina Garrigues	N
6	Springfield Lasers	Alisa Kleybanova	Y
7	Springfield Lasers (Note: The Washington Kastles traded the seventh pick in the first round to the Springfield Lasers in exchange for the sixth pick in the third round and financial consideration.)	Anna-Lena Grönefeld	N

Second round

No.	Team	Player chosen	Prot?
1	San Diego Aviators	Raven Klaasen	N
2	Philadelphia Freedoms	Liezel Huber	Y
3	Austin Aces	Eva Hrdinová	N
4	Boston Lobsters	Eric Butorac	Y
5	Texas Wild	Aisam Qureshi	Y
6	Springfield Lasers	Jean-Julien Rojer	Y
7	Washington Kastles	Leander Paes	Y

Third round

No.	Team	Player chosen	Prot?
1	Springfield Lasers (Note: The San Diego Aviators traded the first pick in the third round to the Springfield Lasers in exchange for the sixth pick in the fourth round and financial consideration.)	Michael Russell	N
2	Philadelphia Freedoms	Marcelo Melo	N
3	Austin Aces	Treat Huey	Y
4	Boston Lobsters	Megan Moulton-Levy	N
5	Texas Wild	Alex Bogomolov Jr.	Y
6	Washington Kastles	Pass	-
7	Washington Kastles	Bobby Reynolds	Y

Fourth round

No.	Team	Player chosen	Prot?
1	San Diego Aviators	Květa Peschke	Y
2	Philadelphia Freedoms	Frank Dancevic	N
3	Austin Aces	Pass	-
4	Boston Lobsters	Rik de Voest	N
5	Texas Wild	Darija Jurak	Y
6	San Diego Aviators	Pass	-
7	Washington Kastles	Anastasia Rodionova	Y

== Event chronology ==
=== Regular season ===
- July 7: The San Diego Aviators and the Austin Aces opened their seasons against each other at the Valley View Casino Center in San Diego in the debut match for both teams after the relocations of their franchises. The Aviators ended a seven-match losing streak with which they ended the 2013 season as the New York Sportimes by beating the Aces, 23–11. The match opened with men's singles as Andy Roddick represented the Aces, and Somdev Devvarman took the court for the Aviators. Devvarman won the opening set, 5–2. The Aces struck back in the next set as Vera Zvonareva beat Daniela Hantuchová, 5–3, to cut the Aviators' lead to 8–7. But the Aviators took control of the match from there winning the next three sets. Raven Klaasen and Květa Peschke topped Roddick and Zvonareva, 5–2, in mixed doubles. Hantuchová and Peschke beat Eva Hrdinová and Zvonareva, 5–2, in women's doubles. Devvarman and Klaasen dominated Roddick and Treat Huey, 5–0, in men's doubles.
- July 8: The Austin Aces had a successful home debut at Cedar Park Center in Cedar Park, Texas just outside Austin against the Springfield Lasers in the first home match for the former Orange County Breakers after the franchise moved from Irvine, California. In a match nationally televised by the Tennis Channel, the Aces were led by Austin hometown hero Andy Roddick who beat the Michael Russell, 5–2, in the opening set to take the men's singles. The Lasers bounced back in men's doubles with Ross Hutchins and Michael Russell beating Treat Huey and Roddick, 5–2, to tie the match at 7–7. The Aces moved back in front as Marion Bartoli and Huey beat Olga Govortsova and Ross Hutchins in mixed doubles, 5–2. However, the Lasers tied the match again with a 5–2 set win in women's doubles by Līga Dekmeijere and Govortsova over Bartoli and Vera Zvonareva. In the final set, Zvonareva delivered a 5–3 win in women's singles over Govortsova to give the Aces a 19–17 victory.
- July 14: After opening the season with six consecutive victories, the Washington Kastles suffered their first defeat, losing at home to the San Diego Aviators, 22–18. Including the 2013 regular season and playoffs, the Kastles had won 18 in a row.
- July 15: After starting the season with six consecutive losses, the Boston Lobsters earned a 20–18 overtime victory over the Austin Aces that ended their eight-match losing streak going back to the 2013 regular season and playoffs. After Rik de Voest won the men's singles and Sharon Fichman and Megan Moulton-Levy won the women's doubles each by scores of 5–0, the Aces charged back from the 10–0 deficit to win the next three sets and force overtime. After losing the first three games of overtime and seeing their lead in the match reduced to 19–18, the Lobsters' mixed-doubles team of Moulton-Levy and de Voest won the fourth overtime game to avoid the super tiebreaker and secure the victory. This would be the only win of the season for the Lobsters.
- July 18: Despite losing their second straight match and third of the last four to fall to a record of 7 wins and 3 losses, the Washington Kastles clinched a playoff berth when the Philadelphia Freedoms defeated the Boston Lobsters, 25–14.
- July 19: With a record of 6 wins and 4 losses, the Philadelphia Freedoms clinched a playoff berth when the Washington Kastles defeated the Boston Lobsters, 23–9. The Lobsters were eliminated from the playoff race with the loss.
- July 20: The San Diego Aviators defeated the Springfield Lasers, 21–15, to improve their record to 8 wins and 4 losses. The Aviators got set wins from Květa Peschke and Daniela Hantuchová (5-3 in women's doubles), Mike Bryan and Peschke (5–4 in mixed doubles), Hantuchová (5–3 in women's singles) and Bob and Mike Bryan (5–0 in men's doubles). Later that evening, the Aviators clinched a playoff berth and home-court advantage for the Western Conference Championship Match when the Austin Aces defeated the Texas Wild, 22–16.
- July 22: The Washington Kastles won their third straight match and improved their record to 10 wins and 3 losses with a 23–15 victory over the Springfield Lasers and clinched home-court advantage for the Eastern Conference Championship Match. The Kastles got set wins from Sloane Stephens (5–2 in women's singles), Leander Paes and Bobby Reynolds (5–4 in men's doubles), Martina Hingis and Anastasia Rodionova (5—2 in women's doubles) and Hingis and Paes (5–2 in mixed doubles).
- July 23: The Springfield Lasers earned a victory on the last day of the regular season over the Boston Lobsters, 25–7, to clinch a playoff berth. The Lasers got set wins from Ross Hutchins and Michael Russell (5–2 in men's doubles), Olga Govortsova and Abigail Spears (5–0 in women's doubles), Hutchins and Spears (5–2 in mixed doubles), Govortsova (5–0 in women's singles) and Russell (5–4 in men's singles). The Lasers' win eliminated the Austin Aces and Texas Wild from the playoff race.
- July 23: The San Diego Aviators defeated the Austin Aces, 22–12, at Valley View Casino Center to give them the best regular-season record in WTT in 2014. The Aviators and Washington Kastles both finished the season with 10 wins and 4 loss, but the Aviators won the only regular-season meeting between the teams, giving them a tiebreaker edge. The Aviators won four of the five sets in the match against the Aces and were led by Somdev Devvarman (5–0 in men's singles), Bob Bryan and Květa Peschke (5–2 in mixed doubles), Daniela Hantuchová (5–3 in women's singles) and Bob and Mike Bryan (5–2 in men's doubles).

=== Playoffs ===
- July 24: The three-time defending WTT Champion Washington Kastles opened the postseason defense of their title by hosting the Philadelphia Freedoms. The Kastles got set wins from Bobby Reynolds (5–3 in men's singles), Martina Hingis and Leander Paes (5–2 in mixed doubles) and Hingis and Anastasia Rodionova (5–1 in women's doubles). After Frank Dancevic and Marcelo Melo won the fifth set for the Freedoms, Paes and Bobby Reynolds won the first game of overtime to give the Kastles a 21–16 victory and their fourth consecutive Eastern Conference Championship.
- July 24: In the first-ever playoff match for the San Diego Aviators since the franchise relocated from New York, the Aviators hosted the defending Western Conference Champion Springfield Lasers. The Lasers got set wins from Michael Russell (5–4 in men's singles), Olga Govortsova (5–0 in women's singles) and Russell and Ross Hutchins (5–3 in men's doubles) on their way to a 22–17 victory and their second consecutive Western Conference Championship.
- July 27: The Washington Kastles won their fourth consecutive King Trophy with a 25–13 victory in the WTT Final against the Springfield Lasers in Springfield, Missouri in a match nationally televised on ESPN2 (joined in progress during the first set). The Kastles won all five sets of the match: Bobby Reynolds (5–4 in men's singles), Martina Hingis (5–2 in women's singles), Reynolds and Leander Paes (5–2 in men's doubles), Hingis and Anastasia Rodionova (5–1 in women's doubles) and Paes and Hingis (5–4 in mixed doubles). Hingis was named Championship Most Valuable Player.

== Standings ==
Eastern Conference
Pos	Team	MP	W	L	PCT	MB	GW	GL
1	Washington Kastles	14	10	4	.714	0	303	213
2	Philadelphia Freedoms	14	9	5	.643	1	284	254
3	Boston Lobsters	14	1	13	.071	9	189	322

2014 Eastern Conference Playoffs

Western Conference
Pos	Team	MP	W	L	PCT	MB	GW	GL
1	San Diego Aviators	14	10	4	.714	0	287	236
2	Springfield Lasers	14	7	7	.500	3	270	239
3	Austin Aces	14	6	8	.429	4	232	290
4	Texas Wild	14	6	8	.429	4	263	274

2014 Western Conference Playoffs

- Austin won 2 of the 3 matches it played against Texas placing it third in the Western Conference.
- San Diego won the only match it played against Washington and thus finished with the league's best record.

== Results table ==
Abbreviation and Color Key: Austin Aces – AUS • Boston Lobsters – BOS • Philadelphia Freedoms – PHI • San Diego Aviators – SDA Springfield Lasers – SPR • Texas Wild – TEX • Washington Kastles – WAS Win • Loss • Home • Away
Team	Match													
Team	1	2	3	4	5	6	7	8	9	10	11	12	13	14
Austin Aces	SDA	SPR	SDA	WAS	PHI	SPR	BOS	BOS	TEX	TEX	SDA	TEX	PHI	SDA
Austin Aces	11-23	19-17	20-18	10-25	11-25	13-21	22-18	18-20 (OT)	23-22 (STB 7–4)	12-23	18-22	22-16	21-18	12-22
Boston Lobsters	TEX	WAS	WAS	SPR	SDA	AUS	AUS	SDA	PHI	WAS	PHI	WAS	PHI	SPR
Boston Lobsters	14-23 (OT)	16-24 (OT)	8-25	13-23 (OT)	19-21 (OT)	18-22	20-18 (OT)	15-20 (OT)	14-25	9-23	21-23	9-25	6-25	7-25
Philadelphia Freedoms	SPR	SDA	WAS	TEX	AUS	WAS	SDA	SPR	WAS	BOS	BOS	AUS	BOS	WAS
Philadelphia Freedoms	21-20 (STB 7–3)	19-20 (STB 1–7)	10-25	21-22 (STB 1–7)	25-11	14-23	19-18	21-18	22-15 (OT)	25-14	23-21	18-21	25-6	21-20 (STB 7–4)
San Diego Aviators	AUS	PHI	AUS	TEX	BOS	TEX	WAS	PHI	BOS	SPR	AUS	SPR	TEX	AUS
San Diego Aviators	23-11	20-19 (STB 7–1)	18-20	19-20 (STB 6–7)	21-19 (OT)	21-18	22-18	18-19	20-15 (OT)	18-19 (STB 2–7)	22-18	21-15	22-13	22-12
Springfield Lasers	PHI	TEX	AUS	BOS	TEX	AUS	TEX	PHI	SDA	WAS	TEX	SDA	WAS	BOS
Springfield Lasers	20-21 (STB 3–7)	16-17 (STB 5–7)	17-19	23-13 (OT)	19-18 (STB 7–6)	21-13	13-22	18-21	19-18 (STB 7–2)	24-10	25-16	15-21	15-23	25-7
Texas Wild	BOS	SPR	WAS	SDA	PHI	SPR	SDA	SPR	WAS	AUS	AUS	SPR	AUS	SDA
Texas Wild	23-14 (OT)	17-16 (STB 7–5)	15-24	20-19 (STB 7–6)	22-21 (STB 7–1)	18-19 (STB 6–7)	18-21	22-13	18-23	22-23 (STB 4–7)	23-12	16-25	16-22	13-22
Washington Kastles	BOS	TEX	BOS	PHI	AUS	PHI	SDA	TEX	PHI	SPR	BOS	BOS	SPR	PHI
Washington Kastles	24-16 (OT)	24-15	25-8	25-10	25-10	23-14	18-22	23-18	15-22 (OT)	10-24	23-9	25-9	23-15	20-21 (STB 4–7)

== Playoff bracket ==
Conference Championships (July 24)
E1	Washington Kastles	21*
E2	Philadelphia Freedoms	16
W1	San Diego Aviators	17
W2	Springfield Lasers	22

WTT Final (July 27)
2	Washington Kastles	25
4	Springfield Lasers	13

* indicates match went to overtime.

== Playoff match summaries ==
=== Eastern Conference Championship Match ===
July 24 at Kastles Stadium at Charles E. Smith Center, Washington, D.C.: Washington Kastles 21, Philadelphia Freedoms 16, overtime

- Men's singles: Bobby Reynolds (Kastles) def. Frank Dancevic (Freedoms), 5–3
- Women's singles: Taylor Townsend (Freedoms) def. Martina Hingis (Kastles), 5–2
- Mixed doubles: Martina Hingis and Leander Paes (Kastles) def. Liezel Huber and Marcelo Melo (Freedoms), 5–2
- Women's doubles: Martina Hingis and Anastasia Rodionova (Kastles) def. Liezel Huber and Taylor Townsend (Freedoms), 5–1
- Men's doubles: Frank Dancevic and Marcelo Melo (Freedoms) def. Leander Paes and Bobby Reynolds (Kastles), 5–3
- Overtime – Men's doubles: Leander Paes and Bobby Reynolds (Kastles) def. Frank Dancevic and Marcelo Melo (Freedoms), 1–0

=== Western Conference Championship Match ===
July 24 at Valley View Casino Center, San Diego, California: Springfield Lasers 22, San Diego Aviators 17

- Men's singles: Michael Russell (Lasers) def. Somdev Devvarman (Aviators), 5–4
- Women's doubles: Květa Peschke and Daniela Hantuchová (Aviators) def. Olga Govortsova and Līga Dekmeijere (Lasers), 5–4
- Mixed doubles: Bob Bryan and Květa Peschke (Aviators) def. Ross Hutchins and Olga Govortsova (Lasers), 5–3
- Women's singles: Olga Govortsova (Lasers) def. Daniela Hantuchová (Aviators), 5–0
- Men's doubles: Michael Russell and Ross Hutchins (Lasers) def. Bob Bryan and Mike Bryan (Aviators), 5–3

=== WTT Final Match ===
July 27 at Mediacom Stadium at Cooper Tennis Complex, Springfield, Missouri: (Note: Prior to the start of the season, WTT determined that the WTT Final Match would be played on the home court of the Western Conference champion. Washington, as the higher seed, was treated as the "home" team under WTT rules for determining order of play.) Washington Kastles 25, Springfield Lasers 13

- Men's singles: Bobby Reynolds (Kastles) def. Michael Russell (Lasers), 5–4
- Women's singles: Martina Hingis (Kastles) def. Olga Govortsova (Lasers), 5–2
- Men's doubles: Bobby Reynolds and Leander Paes (Kastles) def. Ross Hutchins and Michael Russell (Lasers), 5–2
- Women's doubles: Martina Hingis and Anastasia Rodionova (Kastles) def. Olga Govortsova and Līga Dekmeijere (Lasers), 5–1
- Mixed doubles: Leander Paes and Martina Hingis (Kastles) def. Ross Hutchins and Olga Govortsova (Lasers), 5–4

== Individual statistical leaders ==
The tables below show the WTT players who had the highest regular-season winning percentages in each of the league's five events. Only players who played in at least 40% of the total number of games played by their team in a particular event are eligible to be listed among the official WTT league leaders for that event.

Men's singles

Rank	Player	Team	GP	GW	GL	PCT
1	Michael Russell	Springfield Lasers	98	62	36	.633
2	Bobby Reynolds	Washington Kastles	88	50	38	.568
3	Somdev Devvarman	San Diego Aviators	105	52	53	.495

Women's singles

Rank	Player	Team	GP	GW	GL	PCT
1	Martina Hingis	Washington Kastles	45	32	13	.711
2	Daniela Hantuchová	San Diego Aviators	102	57	45	.559
3	Taylor Townsend	Philadelphia Freedoms	90	47	43	.522

Men's doubles

Rank	Player	Team	GP	GW	GL	PCT
1	Somdev Devvarman	San Diego Aviators	86	47	39	.547
1	Raven Klaasen	San Diego Aviators	86	47	39	.547
3	Alex Bogomolov Jr.	Texas Wild	101	54	47	.535
4	Leander Paes	Washington Kastles	113	60	53	.531
5	Bobby Reynolds	Washington Kastles	112	59	53	.527
6	Aisam Qureshi	Texas Wild	108	56	52	.519

Women's doubles

Rank	Player	Team	GP	GW	GL	PCT
1	Martina Hingis	Washington Kastles	63	43	20	.683
2	Anastasia Rodionova	Washington Kastles	87	58	29	.667
3	Daniela Hantuchová	San Diego Aviators	99	60	39	.606
3	Květa Peschke	San Diego Aviators	99	60	39	.606
5	Olga Govortsova	Springfield Lasers	95	53	42	.558
6	Taylor Townsend	Philadelphia Freedoms	97	49	48	.505

Mixed doubles

Rank	Player	Team	GP	GW	GL	PCT
1	Marcelo Melo	Philadelphia Freedoms	110	68	42	.618
2	Liezel Huber	Philadelphia Freedoms	102	63	39	.618
3	Martina Hingis	Washington Kastles	71	41	30	.577
4	Olga Govortsova	Springfield Lasers	62	35	27	.565
5	Eva Hrdinová	Austin Aces	53	29	24	.547
6	Leander Paes	Washington Kastles	109	58	51	.532

== Individual honors ==
Award	Recipient	Team
Female Most Valuable Player	Daniela Hantuchová	San Diego Aviators
Male Most Valuable Player	Marcelo Melo	Philadelphia Freedoms
Female Rookie of the Year	Anabel Medina Garrigues	Texas Wild
Male Rookie of the Year	Somdev Devvarman	San Diego Aviators
Coach of the Year	David Macpherson	San Diego Aviators
WTT Final Most Valuable Player (Note: In past years, the equivalent of this award was called Championship Most Valuable Player, when WTT held what it called Championship Weekend with all postseason matches played at the same site.)	Martina Hingis	Washington Kastles

== Team statistics ==
The tables below show the regular-season winning percentages of each team in each of the league's five events.

Men's singles

Rank	Team	GP	GW	GL	PCT
1	Springfield Lasers	106	65	41	.613
2	Washington Kastles	101	60	41	.594
3	San Diego Aviators	105	52	53	.495
4	Philadelphia Freedoms	111	54	57	.486
5	Texas Wild	109	51	58	.468
6	Austin Aces	105	46	59	.438
7	Boston Lobsters	101	41	60	.406

Women's singles

Rank	Team	GP	GW	GL	PCT
1	Washington Kastles	96	60	36	.625
2	San Diego Aviators	102	57	45	.559
3	Philadelphia Freedoms	98	52	46	.531
4	Texas Wild	103	53	50	.515
5	Springfield Lasers	104	52	52	.500
6	Austin Aces	102	50	52	.490
7	Boston Lobsters	91	24	67	.264

Men's doubles

Rank	Team	GP	GW	GL	PCT
1	San Diego Aviators	105	62	43	.590
2	Washington Kastles	113	60	53	.531
3	Texas Wild	108	56	52	.519
4	Philadelphia Freedoms	116	60	56	.517
5	Springfield Lasers	104	49	55	.471
6	Austin Aces	107	49	58	.458
7	Boston Lobsters	111	46	65	.414

Women's doubles

Rank	Team	GP	GW	GL	PCT
1	Washington Kastles	96	64	32	.667
2	San Diego Aviators	99	60	39	.606
3	Springfield Lasers	95	53	42	.558
4	Philadelphia Freedoms	103	50	53	.485
5	Texas Wild	106	51	55	.481
6	Austin Aces	101	39	62	.386
7	Boston Lobsters	94	30	64	.319

Mixed doubles

Rank	Team	GP	GW	GL	PCT
1	Philadelphia Freedoms	110	68	42	.618
2	Washington Kastles	110	59	51	.536
3	Springfield Lasers	100	51	49	.510
4	San Diego Aviators	112	56	56	.500
5	Texas Wild	111	52	59	.468
6	Austin Aces	107	48	59	.449
7	Boston Lobsters	114	48	66	.421

== Television ==
The Tennis Channel broadcast four matches nationally. However, only one was shown live; the other three were shown on tape delay. The matches shown by the Tennis Channel were

- July 8 at 7:30 pm CDT: Springfield Lasers at Austin Aces (broadcast on tape delay at 12:00 midnight EDT on July 9)
- July 15 at 7:00 pm EDT: San Diego Aviators at Philadelphia Freedoms (broadcast on tape delay at 10:00 pm EDT)
- July 16 at 7:00 pm EDT: Texas Wild at Washington Kastles (broadcast on tape delay at 10:00 pm EDT)
- July 22 at 7:00 pm PDT: Texas Wild at San Diego Aviators (broadcast live)

The WTT Final between the Washington Kastles and the Springfield Lasers on July 27 at 4:00 pm CDT was broadcast live by ESPN2, but was scheduled to be joined in progress at 6:00 pm EDT, approximately one hour after the match's scheduled starting time. However, ESPN2's coverage of the 2014 Atlanta Open ended earlier than expected, and the network went to coverage of the WTT Final earlier than originally planned, joining the match during the first set.

In addition to the five national telecasts described above, several matches were shown by regional sports networks, and many of these were made available to affiliated channels in other markets.
