= 2013 World TeamTennis season =

- Duration: July 7, 2013 – July 24, 2013
- Eastern Conference Champions champions: Washington Kastles
- Western Conference Champions champions: Springfield Lasers

WTT Finals
- Date: July 28, 2013
- Venue: Washington, D.C.
- Champions: Washington Kastles

Seasons
- 2012 2014

The 2013 World TeamTennis season is the 38th season of the top professional tennis league in the United States. The Washington Kastles won their third consecutive WTT title by defeating Springfield Lasers in the Finals.

== Competition format ==
The 2013 World TeamTennis season includes 8 teams, split into two conferences (Eastern and Western). The Eastern Conference and Western Conference have 4 teams each. Each team plays a 14-match regular season schedule, with 7 home and 7 away matches.

The top two teams from both the Western and Eastern Conference advance to the 2013 Mylan WTT Conference Championships which will be hosted on Thursday, July 25 by the top-seeded team in each Conference. The 2013 Mylan WTT Finals will be contested on the home court of the Eastern Conference Champions.

== Standings ==
Eastern Conference
| Pos | Team | MP | W | L | Perc | MB | GW | GL |
| 1 | Washington Kastles | 14 | 12 | 2 | 0.857 | - | 304 | 228 |
| 2 | Boston Lobsters | 14 | 5 | 9 | 0.357 | 7 | 240 | 293 |
| 3 | Philadelphia Freedoms | 14 | 5 | 9 | 0.357 | 7 | 259 | 286 |
| 4 | New York Sportimes | 14 | 4 | 10 | 0.286 | 8 | 252 | 281 |

| 2013 Eastern Conference Playoffs |

Western Conference
| Pos | Team | MP | W | L | Perc | MB | GW | GL |
| 1 | Springfield Lasers | 14 | 9 | 5 | 0.643 | - | 289 | 257 |
| 2 | Texas Wild | 14 | 9 | 5 | 0.643 | 0 | 281 | 265 |
| 3 | Orange County Breakers | 14 | 7 | 7 | 0.500 | 2 | 269 | 260 |
| 4 | Sacramento Capitals | 14 | 5 | 9 | 0.357 | 4 | 253 | 277 |

| 2013 Western Conference Playoffs |

== Results table ==
Abbreviation and Color Key: Boston Lobsters - BOS • New York Sportimes - NYS • Orange County Breakers - OCB • Philadelphia Freedoms - PHI Sacramento Capitals - SAC • Springfield Lasers - SPR • Texas Wild - TEX • Washington Kastles - WAS Win • Loss • Home • Away
| Team | Match | | | | | | | | | | | | | |
| Team | 1 | 2 | 3 | 4 | 5 | 6 | 7 | 8 | 9 | 10 | 11 | 12 | 13 | 14 |
|---|---|---|---|---|---|---|---|---|---|---|---|---|---|---|
| Boston Lobsters | NYS | SPR | WAS | NYS | SAC | TEX | PHI | WAS | NYS | SAC | WAS | SPR | PHI | WAS |
| Boston Lobsters | 20-18 | 14-22 | 12-25 | 17-24 | 23-19 | 17-22 | 22-19 | 18-23 | 14-21 | 19-15 | 18-19 | 15-23 | 22-18 | 9-25 |
| New York Sportimes | BOS | WAS | SPR | BOS | PHI | PHI | BOS | PHI | OCB | WAS | SPR | TEX | WAS | PHI |
| New York Sportimes | 18-20 | 15-23 | 22-21 | 24-17 | 19-20 | 22-17 | 21-14 | 16-21 | 13-20 | 20-21 | 16-22 | 20-22 | 15-23 | 11-20 |
| Orange County Breakers | PHI | TEX | SAC | TEX | SPR | SPR | SAC | TEX | NYS | PHI | TEX | SAC | SAC | SPR |
| Orange County Breakers | 20-17 | 18-20 | 14-22 | 25-15 | 19-21 | 20-19 | 21-13 | 23-17 | 20-13 | 19-22 | 18-20 | 16-21 | 16-21 | 20-19 |
| Philadelphia Freedoms | OCB | SAC | SPR | NYS | BOS | NYS | WAS | NYS | OCB | SPR | TEX | WAS | BOS | NYS |
| Philadelphia Freedoms | 17-20 | 19-23 | 20-23 | 20-19 | 19-22 | 17-22 | 18-22 | 21-16 | 22-19 | 21-20 | 14-24 | 13-23 | 18-22 | 20-11 |
| Sacramento Capitals | TEX | PHI | OCB | BOS | WAS | TEX | OCB | TEX | SPR | BOS | OCB | OCB | SPR | TEX |
| Sacramento Capitals | 22-17 | 23-19 | 22-14 | 19-23 | 14-23 | 10-23 | 13-21 | 19-22 | 19-20 | 15-19 | 21-16 | 21-16 | 17-22 | 18-22 |
| Springfield Lasers | BOS | NYS | PHI | WAS | OCB | OCB | TEX | WAS | SAC | PHI | NYS | BOS | SAC | OCB |
| Springfield Lasers | 22-14 | 21-22 | 23-20 | 22-15 | 21-19 | 19-20 | 20-18 | 15-21 | 20-19 | 20-21 | 22-16 | 23-15 | 22-17 | 19-20 |
| Texas Wild | SAC | OCB | WAS | OCB | BOS | SAC | SPR | OCB | SAC | WAS | OCB | PHI | NYS | SAC |
| Texas Wild | 17-22 | 20-18 | 23-18 | 15-25 | 22-17 | 23-10 | 18-20 | 17-23 | 22-19 | 16-23 | 20-18 | 24-14 | 22-20 | 22-18 |
| Washington Kastles | NYS | BOS | TEX | SPR | SAC | BOS | PHI | SPR | TEX | NYS | BOS | PHI | NYS | BOS |
| Washington Kastles | 23-15 | 25-12 | 18-23 | 15-22 | 23-14 | 23-18 | 22-18 | 21-15 | 23-16 | 21-20 | 19-18 | 23-13 | 23-15 | 25-9 |

== Playoffs ==
Conference Championships
E1 | Washington Kastles | 25
E2 | Boston Lobsters | 12
W1 | Springfield Lasers | 25
W2 | Texas Wild | 9

WTT Finals
1 | Washington Kastles | 25
2 | Springfield Lasers | 12
