= Washington Kastles =

American tennis team

- Sport: Team Tennis
- Founded: February 14, 2008
- League: World TeamTennis
- Team history: Washington Kastles; 2008–2021
- Based in: Washington, D.C.
- Stadium: Kastles Stadium at Union Market
- Colors: Red, white, blue
- Owner: Mark Ein
- Head coach: Murphy Jensen
- Championships: 6 (2009, 2011, 2012, 2013, 2014, 2015)
- Cheerleaders: 8
- Mascot: Topspin and Slice

The Washington Kastles was one of eight franchises that competed in World TeamTennis. Founded in 2008 and based in Washington, D.C., the Kastles won the WTT championship six times, tied for a league record. The team was named for Kastle Systems, a security company founded by owner Mark Ein.

== Venue ==
The Kastles played outdoors on the roof of Union Market at 1309 5th Street, NE, Washington, DC.

The team played its 2008, 2009, and 2010 seasons in a temporary stadium erected each summer on the site of the former Washington Convention Center in downtown Washington. They played the next three seasons at Kastles Stadium at The Wharf, a 2,600-seat facility erected in 2011 on the Southwest Waterfront. That facility was torn down for the city's waterfront development project.

From 2014 to 2018, the Kastles played indoors at George Washington University's Charles E. Smith Center at 22nd and G Streets NW. In 2014, two matches drew 3,275 fans, setting a Kastles attendance record. A new record of 4,200-plus was set the following year after the venue sold out and additional seating section was installed.

== History ==
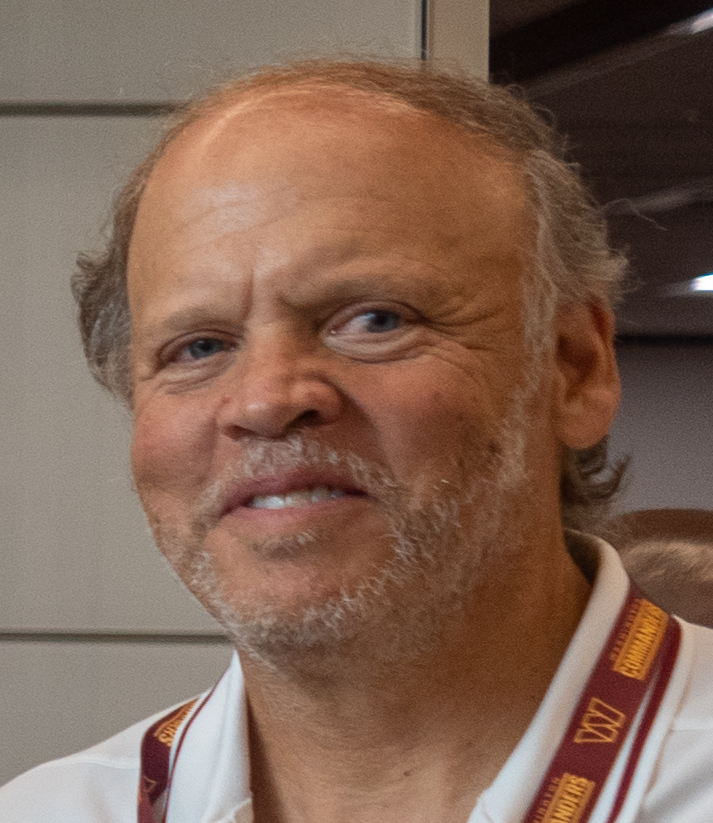
The Kastles were founded by local entrepreneur Mark Ein

The Washington Kastles were founded by local entrepreneur Mark Ein on February 14, 2008, where they finished 6–8.

They won their first King Trophy (named after former world No. 1 player and league co-owner Billie Jean King) in 2009 despite losing their first four matches and finishing just 7–7 during the regular season.

The Kastles failed to qualify for the playoffs in 2010 but then went undefeated in both the 2011 and 2012 seasons, winning all 14 regular-season matches, the Eastern Conference championship and the WTT championship.

In 2011, the Kastles went undefeated, the first perfect season for a World TeamTennis team and only the second team, after the 1994 Newport Beach Dukes, to win all of its regular-season matches. (The Newport Beach Dukes lost in the playoffs). It was the first time a Washington professional sports team posted an undefeated regular season and also won its league championship.

In 2012, the Kastles finished 16–0 again, becoming the first U.S. professional sports team to complete back-to-back perfect seasons.

The Kastles won their 2013 season opener against the New York Sportimes, 23–15, notching their 33rd consecutive victory and equaling the winning streak of the NBA's 1971–72 Los Angeles Lakers. In their next match, they beat the Boston Lobsters, 25–12, a 34th victory that set the U.S. record for a winning streak by a major professional sports team.

On July 10, 2013, the Kastles had their winning streak snapped by the Texas Wild in Las Colinas, Texas. The next night at home, the Kastles fell to the Springfield Lasers. Martina Hingis was not with the team for the back-to-back losses due to her induction into the International Tennis Hall of Fame. The Kastles won the remaining 10 matches of the regular season and ended up with the best record in the WTT at 12–2. The Kastles beat the Boston Lobsters in the Eastern Conference Championship match on July 25 by a score of 25–12. The Kastles repeated that score of 25–12 in a rain-delayed WTT Championship match against the Springfield Lasers to win their third consecutive WTT Championship and post a final season record of 14–2.

The Kastles continued their winning ways in 2014. Even though the Kastles lost four regular season matches (a home record of 6–1), they posted the best record in the Eastern Conference and hosted the Philadelphia Freedoms in the Eastern Conference Championship match. The Kastles won their fifth Eastern Conference Championship by a score of 21–16.

The Kastles then traveled to Springfield, Missouri, to face the Springfield Lasers in the Mylan WTT Championship Match on July 27, 2014. Since the Kastles had a better regular-season record, they were considered the home team. The Kastles swept all five events and won their fourth consecutive WTT Championship by a score of 25–13. Bobby Reynolds won his Men's Singles event and the Men's Doubles event, his last match as a Washington Kastle. The only other team in the 39-year history of World Team Tennis that won four championships in a row are the Sacramento Capitals. With their WTT Championship in 2015, the Kastles stand alone with five consecutive WTT titles.

The Kastles have missed the playoffs and failed to win the Eastern Conference Championship and WTT Championship only five times in the existence of the franchise (2008, 2010, 2016, 2017 and 2018).

In 2015, the Kastles got off to a slow start and after the first seven matches of the season the team's record was 4–3. In typical Kastles style, the team then reeled off 5 wins in a row and won 6 out of the 7 final matches of the regular season to end up with a record of 10–4, the best record in the WTT's Eastern Conference.

On July 30, 2015, the Kastles hosted the Philadelphia Freedoms at home in the Eastern Conference Championship by a score of 25–9.

On Sunday, August 2, 2015, the Kastles hosted the Austin Aces in the WTT Finals and defeated the Aces 24–18 in extended play. The Kastles extended their consecutive WTT Championship Title streak to 5 in a row and their sixth overall title.

The 2016 Rio Summer Olympics took place during the 2016 World TeamTennis season and many teams had multiple players attend the event. The Kastles were no exception with Leander Paes, Anastasia Rodionova, Martina Hingis and Venus Williams attending the Olympics. The Kastles missed the playoffs for the first time since 2010 and finished third in the league with a record of 7-5 (only 12 matches were played in 2016).

On February 16, 2017, the Mylan WTT Marque Draft was held. The Kastles drafted Martina Hingis, Venus Williams and Bob and Mike Bryan (all were protected status by the Kastles).

On March 13, 2017, it was announced that Mark Ein and Fred Luddy (owner of the San Diego Aviators) had purchased Billie Jean King's majority ownership of the WTT. King will retain a minority stake in WTT and continue as majority owner of the Philadelphia Freedoms franchise. Mark Ein will become Chairman of World Team Tennis and Ilana Kloss will remain as CEO and Commissioner through 2017. Mr. Ein has also recently invested in a new DC-based team in the Overwatch League, a professional eSports league developed and fully controlled by Blizzard Entertainment.

On March 14, 2017, the WTT Roster Draft was held. Washington selected Sam Querrey, Bruno Soares, Madison Brengle and Anastasia Rodionova.

On March 13, 2018, the WTT Draft was held. Washington protected Bob and Mike Bryan, Venus Williams and Madison Brengle. The Kastles selected Tennys Sandgren (first round), Robert Lindstedt (second round) and Nicole Melichar (third round). Also returning to the Kastles is Frances Tiafoe who was added to the roster after the drafts and Naomi Osaka was also added. Matthew Ebden and Christina McHale appeared as substitutes in the first match of the season.

The 2019 WTT Draft was held In March 2019 at the Indian Wells Tennis Garden. The Kastles drafted Frances Tiafoe, Nick Kyrgios, Venus Williams, Bruno Soares, Ooshihito Mishioka, Marta Kostyuk and Lyudmyla Kichenok. Tiafoe, Williams and Kyrgios were declared franchise players.

The WTT has not held any seasons since 2021.

== People ==
=== Head coach ===
Thomas Blake was named head coach of the Washington Kastles in June 2008. Blake became a professional tennis player in 1996 and most notably partnered with his brother, James Blake, to play doubles in the US Open in 1996 and 2002. In 2005, Blake retired from professional singles play.

Murphy Jensen was named the Kastles' head coach at the start of the 2009 season. Jensen and his brother, Luke, won the French Open doubles championship in 1993 and hosts a show on the Tennis Channel. After the Kastles finished undefeated in 2011 and 2012, Jensen was named the league's Coach of the Year. Jensen was also named the league's Coach of the Year in 2013.

=== Roster – 2018 Team Roster ===
- (United States) Murphy Jensen, Head Coach, 2011, 2012 and 2013 Coach of the Year
- (Australia) David Macpherson (assistant coach)
- (United States) Jimmy Arias (assistant coach)
- (United States) Nicole Melichar (Roster Player) (Mixed Doubles Champion, Wimbledon 2018)
- (United States) Venus Williams, 2012 Finals MVP (Marquee Player 2010–2012, 2014, 2017, 2018)
- (United States) Frances Tiafoe
- (Australia) Nick Kyrgios
- (Ukraine) Marta Kostyuk

==== Former Kastles ====
- (South Africa) Kevin Anderson, 2013–2014 (Wild Card)
- (United States) Bob Bryan
- (United States) Mike Bryan
- (United States) Madison Brengle
- (United States) Thomas Blake, 2008 (coach)
- (Belarus) Victoria Azarenka, 2010 (Wild Card)
- (United States) Lester Cook, 2009 (Substitute)
- (United States) Mardy Fish, 2016 (Roster Player)
- (Australia) Jarmila Gajdošová 2014 (Substitute)
- (Romania) Edina Gallovits-Hall, 2012 (Substitute)
- (United States) Justin Gimelstob, 2008 (Roster Player)
- (United States) Robby Ginepri, 2008 (Substitute)
- (Australia) Sam Groth, 2016-2017 (Substitute)
- (United States) Angela Haynes, 2010 (Roster Player)
- (Switzerland) Martina Hingis, 2012 Female MVP (with New York Sportimes), 2013 Female MVP, 2013-2017 (Roster Player)
- (Philippines) Treat Huey, 2012, 2017 (Substitute)
- (Australia) Sacha Jones, 2008 (Roster Player)
- (United States) Kevin Kim, 2008 (Substitute)
- (United States) Raquel Kops-Jones, 2012–13 (Wild Card/Substitute)
- (United States) Denis Kudla, 2016 (Roster Player)
- (Australia) Nick Kyrgios, 2016-2017 (Substitute)
- (Russia) Alla Kudryavtseva, 2013 (Substitute)
- (United States) Lindsey Nelson, 2009 (Substitute)
- (Denmark) Frederik Nielsen, 2013 (Substitute)
- (United States) Scott Oudsema, 2008–09 (Roster Player)
- (India) Leander Paes, 2009-2016 (2009 Male MVP, 2011 Male MVP, 2015 Finals MVP)
- (Russia) Nadia Petrova, 2009 (Wild Card)
- (United States) Tripp Phillips, 2008 (Substitute)
- (Russia) Olga Puchkova, 2009 (Roster Player)
- (United States) Sam Querrey 2017 (Roster Player)
- (United States) Rajeev Ram, 2013, 2015 (Substitute)
- (United States) Bobby Reynolds, 2010–2014 (2010 Male Rookie of the Year) (2012 Male MVP) (2013 Finals MVP) (Roster Player)
- (Australia) Arina Rodionova, 2011–12 (Roster Player)
- (Australia) Anastasia Rodionova, 2015 Female co-MVP, 2012-2017 (Roster Player)
- (United States) Shelby Rogers, 2014 (Substitute)
- (Brazil) Bruno Soares 2017 (Roster Player)
- (United States) Vince Spadea, 2008 (Substitute)
- (United States) Sloane Stephens 2014 (Wild Card)
- (Australia) Rennae Stubbs, 2009–11 (Roster Player)
- (United States) Mashona Washington, 2008 (Roster Player)
- (United States) Serena Williams, (Marquee Player 2008–2009, 2011)

== Seasons ==
=== 2008 season ===
Record: 6–8 (Inaugural Season)

- July 4: @ Philadelphia Freedoms: 23–19 win (1–0)
- July 5: @ Delaware Smash: 21–19 win (2–0)
- July 8: vs. Boston Lobsters (WAS: Serena Williams): 19–22 loss (2–1)
- July 9: @ New York Buzz (WAS: Serena Williams): 21–22 loss (2–2)
- July 10: @ New York Sportimes (WAS: Serena Williams): 20–21 loss (2–3)
- July 11: vs. New York Buzz: 22–21 win (3–3)
- July 13: @ Newport Beach Breakers (WAS: Serena Williams): 18–16 win (4–3)
- July 15: vs. New York Sportimes (NYS: John McEnroe): 18–17 win (5–3)
- July 17: vs. Sacramento Capitals: 15–20 loss (5–4)
- July 18: @ Boston Lobsters: 14–23 loss (5–5)
- July 19: @ Kansas City Explorers (KCS: Bob & Mike Bryan): 13–24 loss (5–6)
- July 20: vs. Philadelphia Freedoms: 19–23 loss (5–7)
- July 22: vs. Delaware Smash: 16–20 loss (5–8)
- July 23: vs. St. Louis Aces (STL: Anna Kournikova): 22–17 win (6–8)

=== 2009 season ===
Record: 7–7 (Eastern Conference Second Seed, World TeamTennis Champions)

- July 2: @ Newport Beach Breakers: 20–21 loss (0–1)
- July 3: @ Sacramento Capitals: 18–22 loss (0–2)
- July 7: vs. Philadelphia Freedoms (PHL: Venus Williams): 16–23 loss (0–3)
- July 8: vs. St. Louis Aces (STL: Anna Kournikova Did Not Play): 15–20 loss (0–4)
- July 9: @ Boston Lobsters (WAS: Serena Williams): 24–17 win (1–4)
- July 10: @ New York Sportimes (WAS: Serena Williams): 25–13 win (2–4)
- July 12: vs. New York Buzz: 19–15 win (3–4)
- July 13: @ Philadelphia Freedoms (WAS: Serena Williams): 19–18 win (Super Tiebreak) (4–4)
- July 14: vs. Newport Beach Breakers (WAS: Serena Williams): 22–12 win (5–4)
- July 16: vs. New York Sportimes (NYS: John McEnroe): 19–20 loss (Super Tiebreak) (5–5)
- July 18: @ Kansas City Explorers (KCS: Bob & Mike Bryan): 17–24 loss (5–6)
- July 20: @ Springfield Lasers: 16–24 loss (5–7)
- July 21: vs. New York Buzz: 23–12 win (6–7)
- July 22: vs. Springfield Lasers: 21–14 win (7–7)

Eastern Conference Championship (Kastles Stadium, City Center, Washington, D.C.)

- July 24: vs. New York Sportimes: 22–19 win (8–7)

World TeamTennis Championship (Kastles Stadium, City Center, Washington, D.C.)

- July 26: vs. Springfield Lasers: 23–20 win (9–7)

=== 2010 season ===
Record: 8–6

- July 5: @ New York Sportimes: 20–21 loss (0–1)
- July 6: vs. Philadelphia Freedoms: 21–15 win (1–1)
- July 7: vs. New York Buzz (WAS: Venus Williams, NYB: Martina Hingis): 25–15 win (2–1)
- July 8: @ Philadelphia Freedoms (WAS: Venus Williams): 21–20 win (3–1)
- July 9: @ New York Buzz (NYB: Martina Hingis): 20–12 win (4–1)
- July 10: @ St. Louis Aces (WAS: Venus Williams, SLA: Lindsay Davenport): 23–16 win (5–1)
- July 12: vs. New York Buzz (NYB: Martina Hingis): 21–20 win (6–1)
- July 13: @ Philadelphia Freedoms: 18–24 lost (6–2)
- July 14: vs. Kansas City Explorers: 22–24 loss (6–3)
- July 15: @ New York Sportimes: 18–23 loss (6–4)
- July 18: vs. Boston Lobsters: 16–20 loss (6–5)
- July 20: vs. New York Sportimes (NYS: John McEnroe): 22–16 win (7–5)
- July 21: vs. St. Louis Aces (SLA: Anna Kournikova): 19–17 win (8–5)
- July 22: @ Boston Lobsters: 15–24 loss (8–6)

=== 2011 season ===
Record: 16–0 (World TeamTennis Champions)

- July 5: vs. Kansas City Explorers (WAS: Venus Williams): 21–18 win (1–0)
- July 6: @ Philadelphia Freedoms (WAS: Venus Williams): 19–18 win (2–0)
- July 7: vs. Boston Lobsters (WAS: Serena Williams): 25–10 win (3–0)
- July 8: @ Springfield Lasers: 23–20 win (4–0)
- July 9: @ Sacramento Capitals (WAS: Serena Williams): 21–16 win (5–0)
- July 11: @ Newport Beach Breakers: 21–13 win (6–0)
- July 12: vs. New York Sportimes: 20–19 win (Super Tiebreak) (7–0)
- July 14: vs. Springfield Lasers: 21–20 win (Last Event Tiebreak) (8–0)
- July 15: vs. St. Louis Aces: 21–20 win (Super Tiebreak) (9–0)
- July 16: @ Boston Lobsters: 25–18 win (10–0)
- July 18: vs. Sacramento Capitals: 25–14 win (11–0)
- July 19: @ New York Sportimes (Albany) (WAS: Serena Williams, NYS: Martina Hingis): 21–20 win (Super Tiebreak) (12–0)
- July 20: @ New York Sportimes (WAS: Serena Williams, NYS: Martina Hingis): 23–15 win (13–0)
- July 21: vs. Philadelphia Freedoms: 25–11 win (14–0)

Eastern Conference Championship (Family Circle Tennis Center, Charleston, South Carolina)

- July 22: vs. Boston Lobsters: 23–15 win (15–0)

World TeamTennis Championship (Family Circle Tennis Center, Charleston, South Carolina)

- July 24: vs. St. Louis Aces: 23–19 win (16–0)

=== 2012 season ===
Record: 16–0 (World TeamTennis Champions)

- July 9: @ Orange County Breakers (OCB: Lindsay Davenport): 22–18 win (1–0)
- July 11: @ Springfield Lasers: 20–18 win (2–0)
- July 12: vs. New York Sportimes (NYS: Martina Hingis): 20–18 win (3–0)
- July 13: @ Boston Lobsters (BOS: Robby Ginepri): 24–19 win (4–0)
- July 15: vs. Philadelphia Freedoms: 22–13 win (5–0)
- July 16: vs. Boston Lobsters (WAS: Venus Williams): 20–11 win (6–0)
- July 18: vs. Sacramento Capitals (SAC: Sam Querrey): 21–19 (OT) win (7–0)
- July 20: vs. Orange County Breakers: 24–13 win (8–0)
- July 21: @ New York Sportimes (WAS: Venus Williams, NYS: Martina Hingis): 21–20 (Super Tiebreak 7–0) win (9–0)
- July 22: vs. Kansas City Explorers (WAS: Venus Williams): 25–8 win (10–0)
- July 24: vs. Philadelphia Freedoms: 21–16 win (11–0)
- July 25: @ New York Sportimes (NYS: Martina Hingis, John McEnroe): 21–16 win (12–0)
- July 27: @ Kansas City Explorers: 22–17 win (13–0)
- July 28: @ Springfield Lasers: 25–14 win (14–0)

Eastern Conference Championship (Family Circle Tennis Center, Charleston, South Carolina)

- September 15: New York Sportimes (WAS: Venus Williams): 19–15 win (15–0)

World TeamTennis Championship (Family Circle Tennis Center, Charleston, South Carolina)

- September 16: Sacramento Capitals (WAS: Venus Williams, SAC: Kevin Anderson): 20–19 win (16–0)

=== 2013 season ===
Record: 14–2 (World TeamTennis Champions)

- July 8: vs. New York Sportimes: 7:10 p.m. (WAS: Martina Hingis, Kevin Anderson): 23–15 win (1–0)
- July 9: vs. Boston Lobsters: 7:10 p.m. (WAS: Martina Hingis, Kevin Anderson): 25–12 win (2–0)
- July 10: @ Texas Wild: 7:35 p.m. (WAS: Kevin Anderson): 18–23 loss (2–1)
- July 11: vs. Springfield Lasers: 7:10 p.m. (SPR: Andy Roddick, WAS: Kevin Anderson): 15–22 loss (2–2)
- July 13: @ Sacramento Capitals: 7:35 p.m.: 23–14 win (3–2)
- July 15: @ Boston Lobsters: 7 p.m. (WAS: Martina Hingis, BOS: Mark Philippoussis): 23–18 win (4–2)
- July 16: @ Philadelphia Freedoms: 7 p.m. (Martina Hingis): 22–18 win (5–2)
- July 17: vs. Springfield Lasers: 7:10 p.m. (WAS: Martina Hingis): 21–15 win (6–2)
- July 19: @ Texas Wild: 7:35 p.m. (WAS: Martina Hingis): 23–16 win (7–2)
- July 20: vs. New York Sportimes: 7 p.m. (WAS: Martina Hingis): 21–20 win (8–2)
- July 21: @ Boston Lobsters: 7 p.m. (WAS: Martina Hingis): 19–18 win (9–2)
- July 22: vs. Philadelphia Freedoms: 7:10 p.m. (WAS: Martina Hingis): 23–13 win (10–2)
- July 23: @ New York Sportimes: 7:30 p.m. (WAS: Martina Hingis): 23–15 win (11–2)
- July 24: vs. Boston Lobsters: 7:10 p.m. (WAS: Martina Hingis): 25–9 win (12–2)

Eastern Conference Championship (Kastles Stadium at The Wharf, Washington, D.C.)

- July 25: Kastles (Home Team based on Record) vs. Boston Lobsters: 7:10 p.m. (WAS: Martina Hingis): 25–12 win (13–2)

World TeamTennis Championship (Kastles Stadium at The Wharf, Washington, D.C.)

- July 28: Kastles (Home Team due to best record in WTT) vs. Springfield Lasers (WAS: Martina Hingis, SPR: Andy Roddick): 25–12 win (14–2)

=== 2014 season ===
- July 7: @ Boston Lobsters: 7 p.m.: 24–16 win (1–0)
- July 8: @ Texas Wild: 7:30 p.m.: 24–15 win (2–0)
- July 9: vs. Boston Lobsters: 7 p.m. (WAS: Martina Hingis, Kevin Anderson): 24–8 win (3–0)
- July 10: vs. Philadelphia Freedoms: 7 p.m. (WAS Martina Hingis, Kevin Anderson): 24–10 win (4–0)
- July 11: @ Austin Aces: 7:30 p.m. (AUS: Andy Roddick, Marion Bartoli, WAS: Martina Hingis): 24–10 win (5–0)
- July 13: vs. Philadelphia Freedoms: 7 p.m. (WAS: Martina Hingis): 23–14 win (6–0)
- July 14: vs. San Diego Aviators: 7 p.m. (SD: Daniela Hantuchová, WAS: Martina Hingis): 18–22 loss (6–1)
- July 16: vs. Texas Wild: 7 p.m. (WAS: Martina Hingis, Venus Williams): 23–18 win (7–1)
- July 17: @ Philadelphia Freedoms: 7 p.m. (WAS: Venus Williams): 15–22 loss (7–2)
- July 18: @ Springfield Lasers: 7 p.m.: 10–24 loss (7–3)
- July 19: @ Boston Lobsters: 7 p.m.: 23–19 win (8–3)
- July 21: vs. Boston Lobsters: 7 p.m. (WAS: Martina Hingis): 25–9 win (9–3)
- July 22: vs. Springfield Lasers: 7 p.m. (WAS: Martina Hingis, Sloane Stephens): 23–15 win (10–3)
- July 23: @ Philadelphia Freedoms: 7 p.m. (WAS: Martina Hingis): 20–21 loss (10–4)

Eastern Conference Championship (Kastles Stadium at the Smith Center, Washington, D.C.)

- July 24: Kastles (Home team based on Record) vs. Philadelphia Freedoms: 7 p.m. (WAS: Martina Hingis): 21–16 win (11–4)

World TeamTennis Championship (Mediacom Stadium at Cooper Tennis Complex, Springfield, Missouri)

- July 27: Kastles (Home team sets order of play due to better regular season record) vs. Springfield Lasers: 5 p.m. (WAS: Martina Hingis): 25–13 win (12–4)

=== 2015 season ===
- Sunday, July 12: @ Boston Lobsters: 6 p.m.: 20–17 win (1–0)
- Tuesday, July 14: vs. Austin Aces: 7 p.m. (WAS: Venus Williams): 17–22 loss (1–1)
- Wednesday, July 15: @ Springfield Lasers: 7 p.m.: 21–16 win (2–1)
- Thursday, July 16: vs. San Diego Aviators: 7 p.m.: 18–22 loss (2–2)
- Friday, July 17: @ Philadelphia Freedoms: 7 p.m.: 21–20 win (3–2)
- Saturday, July 18: vs. Philadelphia Freedoms: 5 p.m.: 23–6 win (4–2)
- Monday, July 20: @ Philadelphia Freedoms: 7 p.m. (WAS: Sam Querrey): 16–18 loss (4–3)
- Tuesday, July 21: vs. Boston Lobsters: 7 p.m. (WAS: Sam Querrey): 25–13 win (5–3)
- Thursday, July 23: @ Boston Lobsters: 7 p.m. (WAS: Martina Hingis): 25–14 win (6–3)
- Friday, July 24: @ Austin Aces: 7 p.m. (WAS: Martina Hingis): 22–14 win (7–3)
- Sunday, July 26: vs. Springfield Lasers: 5 p.m. (WAS: Martina Hingis, Sam Querrey): (Extended Play) 24–16 win (8–3)
- Monday, July 27: vs. California Dream: Time 7 p.m. (WAS: Martina Hingis, Sam Querrey): 19–17 win 9–3
- Tuesday, July 28: @ Austin Aces: 7 p.m. (WAS: Sam Querrey): 16–19 loss (9–4)
- Wednesday, July 29: vs. Boston Lobsters: 7 p.m. (WAS: Martina Hingis, Sam Querrey): 22–19 win (10–4)

Eastern Conference Championship

- Thursday, July 30: Kastles (Home Team based on Record) vs. Philadelphia Freedoms: 7:10 p.m. (WAS: Martina Hingis, Sam Querrey): 25–9 win (11–4)

World TeamTennis Championship (Kastles Stadium at the Smith Center, Washington, D.C.)

- Sunday, August 2: Kastles (Home Team due to Eastern Conference win) vs. Austin Aces: 11:30 a.m. (WAS: Martina Hingis, Sam Querrey): 24–18 win (12–4)

=== 2016 season ===
- Sunday, July 31: @ New York Empire: 6 p.m.: 22–15 win (1–0)
- Monday, August 1: vs. Springfield Lasers: 7 p.m. (WAS: Bob and Mike Bryan, Martina Hingis): 22-16 win (2-0)
- Tuesday, August 2: vs. New York Empire: 7 p.m. (WAS: Martina Hingis, Mardy Fish): 23-14 win (3-0) Mardy Fish was injured during the match, Leander Paes substituted for Fish Murphy Jensen played Men's Doubles with Leander Paes Wednesday, August 3: vs. Philadelphia Freedoms: 7 p.m.: 18-23 loss (3-1)
- Friday, August 5: @ Orange County Breakers: 7 p.m.: 10-25 loss (3-2)
- Saturday, August 6: @ San Diego Aviators: 7 p.m.: 15-21 loss (3-3)
- Monday, August 8: vs. New York Empire: 7 p.m.: 19-21 loss (3-4)
- Tuesday, August 9: @ New York Empire (tennis): (NYE: Andy Roddick): 22-13 win (4-4) (extended play)
- Wednesday, August 10: vs. San Diego Aviators: 7 p.m.: 20-23 loss (4-5)
- Thursday, August 11: @ Philadelphia Freedoms: 24-18 win (5-5)
- Friday, August 12: @ Springfield Lasers: 21-20 win (6-5)
- Saturday, August 13: vs. Orange County Breakers: 5 p.m.: 25-19 win (7-5) (extended play)

=== 2017 season ===
- Sunday, July 16: @ Springfield Lasers: 6 p.m.: 20-24 loss (0–1)
- Tuesday, July 18: vs. New York Empire: 7 p.m. (WAS: Martina Hingis, NYE: Mardy Fish)
- Wednesday, July 19: vs. Orange County Breakers: 7 p.m. (WAS: Martina Hingis)
- Thursday, July 20: vs. San Diego Aviators: 7 p.m. (WAS: Bob and Mike Bryan)
- Friday, July 21: vs. Philadelphia Freedoms: 7 p.m. (PHL: Sloane Stephens, WAS - Nick Kyrgios)
- Sunday: July 23: @ Philadelphia Freedoms: 7 p.m. (PHL: Sloane Stephens)
- Monday: July 24: @ Philadelphia Freedoms: 7 p.m. (WAS: Venus Williams, PHL: Sloane Stephens)
- Tuesday: July 25: vs. Springfield Lasers: 7 p.m. (WAS: Venus Williams)
- Wednesday: July 26: vs. New York Empire: 7 p.m. (NYE: Mardy Fish)
- Friday: July 28: @ Springfield Lasers: 7 p.m.
- Saturday: July 29: vs. Orange County Breakers: 5 p.m.
- Sunday: July 30: @ New York Empire: 5 p.m. (NYE: Mardy Fish)
- Tuesday: August 1: @ Orange County Breakers: 6:05 p.m.
- Wednesday: August 2: @ San Diego Aviators: 7 p.m.

=== 2018 season ===
- Sunday, July 15: @ New York Empire: 5 p.m.: 20-24 win(1–0) (NYE: Steve Johnson)
- Monday, July 16: vs. New York Empire: 7 p.m. (WAS: Frances Tiafoe)
- Wednesday, July 18: vs. Orange County Breakers: 7 p.m. (WAS: Frances Tiafoe)
- Thursday, July 19: vs. San Diego Aviators: 7 p.m. (WAS: Bob and Mike Bryan, Frances Tiafoe)
- Friday, July 20: @Philadelphia Freedoms: 7 p.m. (PHL: Kevin Anderson)
- Saturday: July 21: New York Empire: 5:30 p.m. (WAS: Frances Tiafoe)
- Monday: July 23: @ New York Empire : 7 p.m. (NYE: Mardy Fish)
- Wednesday: July 25: vs. San Diego Aviators: 7 p.m. (WAS: Venus Williams)
- Thursday: July 26: vs. Springfield Lasers: 7 p.m. (WAS: Venus Williams)
- Friday: July 27: @ Philadelphia Freedoms: 7 p.m. (PHL: Sloane Stephens) XS Tennis Village, Chicago, Illinois
- Saturday: July 29: vs. Philadelphia Freedoms: 5 p.m. (WAS: Naomi Osaka)
- Monday: July 30: @Springfield Lasers: 5 p.m.
- Wednesday: August 1: @ San Diego Aviators: 7 p.m.
- Thursday: August 2: @Orange County Breakers: 6 p.m.

== See also ==
- Sports in Washington, D.C.
