= Texas Wild =

- Founded: 1993 (moved to Texas in 2013)
- Folded: February 23, 2015 (moved to California); January 13, 2016 (franchise terminated)
- League: World TeamTennis
- Team history: Kansas City Explorers; 1993–2012; Texas Wild; 2013–2014; California Dream; 2015
- Based in: Irving, Texas
- Stadium: Four Seasons Resort and Club Dallas at Las Colinas
- Colors: Black, Magenta, Yellow and Light Blue
- Head coach: Brent Haygarth
- Championships: 2010 King Trophy (as Kansas City Explorers)
- Local media: KTXA

The Texas Wild was a World TeamTennis team that played at the Four Seasons Resort and Club Dallas at Las Colinas in Irving, Texas, USA. The team was known as the Kansas City Explorers from 1993 until the 2012 season, before moving to Texas. With WTT's contraction of the Las Vegas Neon in 2014, the Wild became the oldest franchise currently operating in the league.

Following the 2014 season, rumors circulated that the Wild may relocate due to poor attendance. In an interview with the Fort Worth Star-Telegram in January 2015, Wild owner Jeff Launius would not confirm that the team would play the 2015 season in Irving. He said, "I’m working on several options for 2015, none of which I am ready to reveal at this time." On February 23, 2015, WTT announced that a new ownership group had taken control of the Wild and moved the team to Citrus Heights, California, renaming it the California Dream.

== Final squad ==
=== On-court personnel ===
- (South Africa) Brent Haygarth – Head Coach
- (Russia) Alex Bogomolov, Jr.
- (Croatia) Darija Jurak
- (Spain) Anabel Medina Garrigues
- (Pakistan) Aisam Qureshi
- (United States) Tim Smyczek

=== Front office ===
- Jeff Launius – Owner and General Manager
- Mel Launius – Owner
