= St. Louis Aces =

- Founded: 1994
- League: World TeamTennis
- Team history: St. Louis Aces; 1994–2011
- Based in: St. Louis, Missouri
- Stadium: Dwight Davis Tennis Center (1994, 1997-2011) Doubletree Hotel and Conference Center (1995-1996)
- Colors: Green, yellow, black, and red
- Owner: Kinosabe Sports
- Head coach: Rick Flach
- General manager: Dani Apted-Schlottmann
- Championships: 1996

The St. Louis Aces were a professional tennis team in the city of St. Louis, Missouri. They entered the World TeamTennis League in 1994, and won their only WTT Championship title two years later. The Aces played their home matches at the Dwight Davis Tennis Center in Forest Park. The Aces played eighteen seasons in WTT before the franchise folded after the 2011 season.

== Final squad ==
- (United States) Rick Leach, Head Coach
- (Russia) Anna Kournikova
- (United States) Lindsay Davenport
- (United States) Tripp Phillips
- (Latvia) Līga Dekmeijere
- (Romania) Andrei Pavel
