= New York Sportimes =

Defunct American tennis team

- Sport: Team tennis
- Founded: 2000
- League: World TeamTennis
- Conference: Eastern (2000 to 2013)
- Team history: New York Hamptons; 2000–2002; New York Sportimes; 2003–2013; San Diego Aviators; 2014–present
- Based in: Randall's Island, New York City and Guilderland, New York
- Stadium: Sportime Stadium at Randall's Island (Capacity: 2,000); SEFCU Arena (Capacity: 2,100)
- Colors: Black, White, Red, Blue, Yellow, Green, and Purple
- Owner: Sportime Clubs et al
- President: Claude Okin
- Head coach: Claude Okin
- Championships: 2005
- Conference titles: 3 Eastern Conference Championships 2005, 2006, 2010
- Playoff berths: 6 – 2005, 2006, 2008, 2009, 2010 and 2012
- Website: www.nysportimes.com

The New York Sportimes were a professional tennis team competing in World TeamTennis (WTT). The team was originally based in eastern Long Island from 2000 to 2002, before moving to Westchester County, New York, in 2003, and then to New York City in 2009. The team was founded as the New York Hamptons in 2000, before changing its name to the New York Sportimes in 2003. In 2005, the team made its first playoff appearance and went on to defeat the Newport Beach Breakers in the WTT Final to win its first King Trophy.

On February 14, 2011, WTT announced that the New York Sportimes and New York Buzz had merged and would play the 2011 season as the New York Sportimes. In the three seasons following the merger, the Sportimes played 12 home matches in New York City and nine in the Capital District. On January 16, 2014, Claude Okin, CEO of the New York Sportimes announced that the franchise had been sold to businessman Russell Geyser, and the team would be relocated to San Diego, California, and renamed the San Diego Aviators.

== Team history ==
=== Early years as New York Hamptons ===
New York Hamptons logo used from 2000 to 2002.

The New York Hamptons were founded by Patrick McEnroe and Richard Ader as a WTT expansion franchise in 2000. The Hamptons made their debut with a 22–21 loss on the road against the Schenectady County Electrics at the Central Park Tennis Stadium in Schenectady, New York on July 10, 2000. Appearing in that first match for the Hamptons were player/owner McEnroe, Jonathan Stark, 15-year-old Monique Viele, and Erika deLone. After another road loss to the Delaware Smash, the Hamptons played their home opener against the Sacramento Capitals on July 13, 2000, and fell, 21–16, dropping their record to 0 wins and 3 losses. The Hamptons got their first win in franchise history at home against the Delaware Smash, 22–21, on July 14, 2000. During the season, the Hamptons signed Tina Križan as a free agent. In their inaugural season, the Hamptons played their home matches at Sportime Quogue in East Quogue, New York. The Hamptons marquee player former world number 1 Jim Courier who was committed to play in four matches during the 2000 season did not appear in either of their first two matches. The Hamptons finished their inaugural season with 5 wins and 9 losses, last in the Eastern Conference.

In 2001, the Hamptons drafted Jan-Michael Gambill as their marquee player. Patrick McEnroe, Jonathan Stark and Tina Križan returned from the previous season's team. The Hamptons chose 20-year-old Katarina Srebotnik in the roster draft. After five years away from WTT having last played with the Kansas City Explorers in 1996, John McEnroe also made a few appearances with his younger brother's team. The Hamptons improved to a record of 7 wins and 7 losses, finishing in third place in the Eastern Conference.

=== Move to Amagansett ===
In 2002, Claude Okin of Sportime Clubs became involved with Patrick McEnroe in running the team. After two years in East Quogue, the Hamptons moved their home matches to the Amagansett-East Side Tennis Club in Amagansett, New York. John and Patrick McEnroe both returned to the team along with Tina Križan and Katarina Srebotnik. The Hamptons added Robert Kendrick in the roster draft. The Hamptons had their first winning season with 10 wins and 4 losses, finishing second in the Eastern Conference just 1 game behind the New York Buzz but missing the playoffs. Srebotnik was named WTT Female Most Valuable Player.

=== Name change to New York Sportimes and move to Westchester ===
In 2003, Sportime NY became a co-owner of the Hamptons with Patrick McEnroe remaining part of the ownership group, and the name of the team was changed to the New York Sportimes. The team moved again, this time from eastern Long Island to Westchester County, and started playing its home matches at Sportime Harbor Island located in both the village and town of Mamaroneck, New York. John and Patrick McEnroe both returned to the court in 2003, for the Sportimes and were joined by Julia Vakulenko, Ellis Ferreira and Bea Bielik who were selected in the roster draft. The Sportimes slipped to 7 wins and 7 losses, finishing third in the Eastern Conference. Bielik was named WTT Female Rookie of the Year.

John and Patrick McEnroe did not return for 2004. The Sportimes selected Monica Seles in the marquee player draft. Bea Bielik was the only player to return from the previous season. Ruxandra Dragomir, Hermes Gamonal and Joe Sirianni were added to the team through the roster draft. John Roddick was named coach of the Sportimes. The Sportimes stumbled to the poorest showing in franchise history with 2 wins and 12 losses, the worst record in WTT.

=== First playoff appearance and King Trophy ===
Following their difficult 2004 season, the Sportimes had the first choice in the 2005 marquee player draft and used it to select John McEnroe who returned to the team after a one-year absence. The team also landed former world number 1 Martina Hingis. Hingis, who had retired from tennis due to injuries at the age of 22 in February 2003, was looking to launch a comeback. After two years away from the team, Robert Kendrick, who was part of the Sportimes' successful 2002 campaign, was chosen in the roster draft. The Sportimes used their other picks to select Jenny Hopkins, Natalie Grandin and Mark Merklein. Joe Guiliano was named the team's coach. Rajeev Ram and Jeff Morrison were later signed as free agents. The complete makeover of the roster paid off as the Sportimes registered 9 wins against 5 losses and finished first in the Eastern Conference.

The Sportimes made the first playoff appearance in franchise history on September 16, 2005, in the Eastern Conference Championship Match against the Boston Lobsters in Citrus Heights, California. The Sportimes completely dominated the Lobsters winning all five sets and taking the match by a score of 25–7. Martina Hingis made a huge difference for the Sportimes who had lost both of their regular-season encounters with the Lobsters without her. Hingis won the women's singles set over Martina Navratilova, 5–2, combined with Jenny Hopkins to win the women's doubles, 5–2, over Navratilova and Kristen Schlukebir and paired with Rajeev Ram to top Navratilova and Johan Landsberg in mixed doubles, 5–2. The 18-game margin of victory was the largest ever in a WTT playoff match. The victory gave the Sportimes their first Eastern Conference Championship and advanced them to the WTT Final.

The following day, the Sportimes met the defending champion Newport Beach Breakers for the WTT title. The Breakers jumped out to an early led when Devin Bowen and Ramón Delgado beat Jeff Morrison and Rajeev Ram, 5–2, in men's doubles. Martina Hingis responded with a 5–1 set win over Katerina Bondarenko in women's singles to give the Sportimes a 7–6 lead. Hingis and Ram followed with a 5–2 set win in mixed doubles over Anastassia Rodionova and Delgado to extend the Sportimes' lead to 12–8. Hingis then teamed with Jenny Hopkins to top Bondarenko and Rodionova in women's doubles, 5–2, to give the Sportimes a 17–10 lead going to the final set. Delgado registered a 5–3 set win over Morrison in men's singles to send the match to overtime with the Sportimes leading 20–15. Delgado then won the first three games of overtime to cut the Sportimes' lead to 20–18 before Morrison won the fourth game to secure the match, 21–18, and give the Sportimes their first King Trophy. The victory topped off a nearly perfect season for Hingis. The only set she lost was in the Sportimes' second match of the regular season to Meghann Shaughnessy in women's singles. For her heroics, Hingis was named WTT Championship Most Valuable Player.

=== Repeat as Eastern Conference champions ===
John McEnroe and Martina Hingis both returned to the defending champion Sportimes for the 2006 season. The team selected husband and wife Alex Bogomolov Jr. and Ashley Harkleroad as well as John Paul Fruterro and Vladka Uhlířová in the roster draft. Chuck Adams was named new coach of the Sportimes. David Martin and Cara Black were later signed as free agents. With WTT's 2006 conference championships decided based on regular-season records, the Sportimes' mark of 10 wins and 4 losses gave them the title over the second-place Philadelphia Freedoms, who finished 8–6. The Sportimes missed having the best overall record in WTT by losing a standings tiebreaker to the Sacramento Capitals and were seeded second in the WTT playoffs. Martin was named WTT Male Rookie of the Year.

The Sportimes met the third-seeded Freedoms in the WTT Semifinals in Newport Beach, California on July 29, 2006. The Freedoms won women's doubles and women's singles to jump out to a 10–5 lead. Alex Bogomolov Jr. topped Jaymon Crabb in a tiebreaker, 5–1, to win the third set, 5–4, and cut the Freedoms' lead to 14–10. The Freedoms took the mixed doubles set, 5–2, to extend their lead to 19–12 heading to the final set. Bogomolov and David Martin topped Crabb and Daniel Nestor in men's doubles, 5–3, to send the match to overtime with the Freedoms leading, 22–17. Crabb and Nestor took the first game of overtime to win the match for the Freedoms and bring the Sportimes' season to an end.

=== A losing season but another Rookie of the Year ===
John McEnroe and Ashley Harkleroad (now divorced from Alex Bogomolov Jr.) returned to the Sportimes for the 2007 season. They added Jesse Witten, Hana Šromová and Mirko Pehar in the roster draft. Chuck Adams returned to coach the team. Sometime after the season, Harkleroad and Adams were married. Their first child, a son named Charlie, was born in March 2009. In a highly competitive Eastern Conference, the Sportimes finished with 6 wins and 8 losses, only 2 matches behind the first-place New York Buzz, but out of playoff contention. The Sportimes finished in fourth place barely avoiding the basement by winning a standings tiebreaker over the Boston Lobsters. On the bright side, Witten was named WTT Male Rookie of the Year, the second consecutive season a Sportimes player had won the award.

=== Return to the playoffs ===
John McEnroe, Jesse Witten and Hana Šromová all returned for the 2008 season. The Sportimes added Bethanie Mattek with the fourth overall pick in the roster draft and Brian Wilson with their final selection. Dustin Taylor replaced Chuck Adams as the head coach. Despite being left unprotected by the Sportimes, Ashley Harkleroad returned to the team later after signing as a free agent. The Sportimes improved to 10 wins and 4 losses, finishing second in the Eastern Conference behind the New York Buzz who had the same record but won a standings tiebreaker over the Sportimes.

Under the 2008 playoff format, the Sportimes were the number 3 seed and matched against the number 2 seed and Eastern Conference Champion New York Buzz in the WTT Semifinals. In the first ever postseasons matchup between the two New York clubs, the Buzz dominated the match winning the first four sets. Nathan Healey and Yaroslava Shvedova opened the match with a 5–3 set win against John McEnroe and Hana Šromová in mixed doubles. Shvedova followed with a 5–2 women's singles win over Ashley Harkleroad. Healy took care of Jesse Witten, 5–2, in men's singles. Gabriela Navrátilová and Shvedova needed a tiebreaker to beat Harkleroad and Šromová, 5–4, and give the Buzz a 20–11 lead heading to the final set. McEnroe and Witten won a tiebreaker over Patrick Briaud and Healy in the men's doubles to force overtime with the Buzz leading 24–16. Briaud and Healy won the second game of overtime to give the Buzz a 25–17 victory and end the Sportimes' season.

=== Move to New York City ===
After six seasons in Mamaroneck, the Sportimes moved into the newly constructed Sportime Stadium at Randall's Island in New York City for the 2009 season. John McEnroe, Jesse Witten and Ashley Harkleroad (who gave birth on the day of the draft and was picked in the third round) all returned from the previous season's squad. The Sportimes traded up in the first round of the roster draft sending their pick along with cash consideration to the St. Louis Aces in exchange for the Aces' first round pick which was number 1 overall. The Sportimes used that choice to select Robert Kendrick. Christina Fusano was taken with the Sportimes' final choice. After a one-year absence, Harkleroad's husband Chuck Adams returned to coach the team. Abigail Spears was later signed as a free agent. The Sportimes repeated their 2008 regular-season performance with 10 wins and 4 losses. This time it was enough for first place in the Eastern Conference and a trip to the Eastern Conference Championship Match.

The Sportimes faced the Washington Kastles for the Eastern Conference title at Kastles Stadium at CityCenter in Washington, D.C., on July 24, 2009. Championship Weekend, including this match, was at a predetermined site, but it ended up being a home match for the Kastles with regard to crowd support. However, as the top seed, the Sportimes were treated as the home team for determining order of play. Just eight days earlier, the two teams had been involved in an on-court incident during a regular-season match in New York that resulted in both teams and several players on each team being fined for unprofessional conduct and leaving the bench area and entering the court while not playing. The Kastles won the opening set of mixed doubles in a tiebreaker to take a 5–4 lead. The Sportimes responded when Abigail Spears defeated Olga Puchkova in women's singles, 5–2, to take a 9–7 lead. WTT Men's Most Valuable Player Leander Paes teamed with Scott Oudsema for a 5–3 men's doubles set win over Robert Kendrick and Jesse Witten to tie the match at 12–12. Rennae Stubbs and Puchkova followed with a 5–2 women's doubles set win over Spears and Christina Fusano to put the Kastles in front, 17–14. In the final set, Kendrick won a tiebreaker against Oudsema in men's singles to force overtime with the Kastles leading 21–19. Oudsema served out the match in the first game of overtime to give the Kastles a 22–19 victory and end the Sportimes' season.

=== Another Eastern Conference Championship ===
John McEnroe, Robert Kendrick, Jesse Witten, Abigail Spears and Ashley Harkleroad all returned to the Sportimes for the 2010 season. Kim Clijsters was added to the team as a marquee player. Chuck Adams continued as coach of the Sportimes. The Sportimes finished the regular season with 9 wins and 5 losses in first place in the Eastern Conference for the second consecutive season and made their third straight playoff appearance.

Unlike the previous season, the first-place teams hosted the conference championship matches in 2010. So, the Sportimes faced the Boston Lobsters at Sportime Stadium at Randall's Island for the Eastern Conference title on July 23, 2010. The Sportimes got off to a quick start when Robert Kendrick and Jesse Witten topped Eric Butorac and Jan-Michael Gambill in men's doubles, 5–2, and Ashley Harkleroad and Abigail Spears beat Raquel Kops-Jones and CoCo Vandeweghe in women's singles, 5–3, giving the Sportimes a 10–5 lead. The Lobsters cut the lead to 14–10 when Gambill won a set tiebreaker against Kendrick. Spears topped Vandeweghe, 5–1, in women's singles to extend the Sportimes lead to 19–11. In the final set, Butorac and Kops-Jones beat Kendrick and Spears in mixed doubles, 5–2, to send the match to overtime with the Sportimes leading, 21–16. Kendrick and Spears won the second game of overtime to seal the match and give the Sportimes their third Eastern Conference Championship.

The Sportimes met the Kansas City Explorers in the WTT Final at Explorers Stadium at Barney Allis Plaza in Kansas City, Missouri on July 25, 2010. Both teams finished with identical won-lost records, and they did not play each other during the regular season. The Explorers were the overall number 2 seed, and the Sportimes were the number 3 seed by virtue of the Explorers winning a standings tiebreaker. Jesse Witten got the Sportimes off to a good start beating Ricardo Mello in men's singles, 5–3. Jarka Groth and Samuel Groth responded with a 5–3 mixed doubles set win over Robert Kendrick and Abigail Spears to tie the match, 8–8. Kendrick and Witten put the Sportimes in front, 13–11, with a men's doubles set win against Samuel Groth and Mello. The Explorers edged back in front, 16–15, on the strength of Jarka Groth's 5–2 women's singles set win over Spears. Jarka Groth and Květa Peschke sealed the match with a 5–3 women's doubles set win against Ashley Harkleroad and Spears, and the Explorers registered a 21–18 victory to capture their first King Trophy.

=== Merger with Buzz ===
On February 14, 2011, WTT announced that the New York Sportimes and New York Buzz had merged with the resulting combined team to be called the New York Sportimes. The team would play five of its seven home matches each season at Sportime Stadium at Randall's Island and the other two at SEFCU Arena in Guilderland, New York on the campus of the University at Albany, former home of the Buzz. The combined franchise could claim a period of great success over the previous six seasons (2005–2010): 2 King Trophies (Sportimes in 2005 and Buzz in 2008), 5 Eastern Conference Championships (Sportimes in 2005, 2006 and 2010 and Buzz in 2007 and 2008) and 6 consecutive first-place finishes (Sportimes in 2005, 2006, 2009 and 2010 and Buzz in 2007 and 2008).

=== New era in New York City and the Capital District ===
The Sportimes were permitted to protect players from the 2010 Sportimes and from the 2010 Buzz for the 2011 season. So, the team protected John McEnroe, Kim Clijsters, Martina Hingis, Robert Kendrick and Jesse Witten. The newly merged team was given the less favorable (based on the 2010 Sportimes results) draft position rather than a slot based on the 2010 Buzz results. The Sportimes had to use their first two selections in the roster draft to keep Kendrick and Witten. In the third round, they chose Katie O'Brien. With six players already in the mix, the Sportimes passed on their fourth round selection. Abigail Spears, Alex Bogdanovic, Greg Jones and Travis Parrott were later signed as free agents. Spears had been an important member of the 2010 Eastern Conference Champions. Květa Peschke was also a late-season free agent signing. Clijsters did not appear in a match for the Sportimes in 2011. The Sportimes had 7 wins and 7 losses and finished third in the Eastern Conference, narrowly missing qualifying for the playoffs by losing a standings tiebreaker to the Boston Lobsters. The Sportimes and Lobsters split their two regular-season meetings. The Lobsters were placed ahead of the Sportimes based on games won during those matches, 41–37. The third-place finish ended the Sportimes franchise's streak of six consecutive first-place finishes.

=== Return to the playoffs ===
John McEnroe, Martina Hingis, Robert Kendrick and Jesse Witten all returned to the Sportimes for 2012. Ashley Harkleroad, who spent five seasons with the Sportimes from 2006 to 2010, was selected in the roster draft. The Sportimes passed on their fourth round draft pick. Harkleroad's husband, Chuck Adams, was named coach of the Sportimes. Abigail Spears, who had been with the Sportimes for the 2009 through 2011 seasons, and Květa Peschke, who played with the team in 2011, were re-signed late in the season as free agents. Shortly before the start of the season, the Sportimes were informed of a scheduling conflict at SEFCU Arena which forced the team to move its two matches in the Capital District to McDonough Sports Complex on the campus of Hudson Valley Community College in Troy, New York. The Sportimes finished with 9 wins and 5 losses, second in the Eastern Conference and advanced to the Eastern Conference Championship Match to play the undefeated defending champion Washington Kastles. Hingis was named WTT Female Most Valuable Player.

The Sportimes and Kastles met at the Family Circle Tennis Center in Charleston, South Carolina, a predetermined neutral site that hosted WTT Championship Weekend. The Eastern Conference Championship Match was played on September 15, 2012, nearly two months after the regular season ended. The break was inserted between the regular season and the playoffs to accommodate the 2012 Summer Olympics and the U.S. Open Tennis Championships. The Kastles entered the match with a 30-match winning streak having won all 16 of their regular- and postseason matches in 2011, and all 14 of their regular-season matches in 2012. The Kastles jumped out to an early lead in the match as Leander Paes and WTT Male Most Valuable Player Bobby Reynolds won the opening set of men's doubles, 5–2, against Robert Kendrick and John McEnroe. Květa Peschke and Kendrick struck back for the Sportimes with a 5–2 set win over Venus Williams and Leander Paes to tie the match, 7–7. Reynolds topped Jesse Witten in men's singles, 5–2, to put the Kastles back in the lead, 12–9. Ashley Harkleroad and Peschke responded with a 5–2 set win of their own in women's doubles over Anastasia Rodionova and Williams to tie the match, 14–14, going to the final set. Williams dominated that final set of women's singles beating Harkleroad, 5–1, to give the Kastles a 19–15 victory and the Eastern Conference Championship and end the season for the Sportimes.

=== Final season in New York ===
Prior to the 2013 roster player draft, the Sportimes traded Martina Hingis to the Washington Kastles for financial consideration. Also prior to the draft, the Sportimes acquired Anna-Lena Grönefeld from the Orange County Breakers for financial consideration. Robert Kendrick, Jesse Witten and Květa Peschke all returned for the 2013 season. Although not drafted by the Sportimes in the marquee draft in February, John McEnroe was signed as a free agent in March, and played for the team in 2013. Claude Okin, the team's principal owner and CEO, also served as the team's coach for 2013. Abigail Spears was re-signed before the start of the season as a free agent. She only appeared in the opening match. During the season, Eric Quigley was signed as a free agent as well and appeared in one match. James Blake was also signed during the season and appeared in one match for the Sportimes.

After a temporary one-year absence during which it played its Capital District home matches in Troy, New York, the Sportimes returned to SEFCU Arena in Guilderland. The team reversed what it had done during the first two seasons after the merger with the Buzz by playing five of its home matches in the Capital District and only two at Sportime Stadium at Randall's Island in New York City.

The Sportimes finished with a dismal record of 4 wins and 10 losses, last in the Eastern Conference and the worst record in WTT. The team's final home match in Albany was a 20–13 loss to the Orange County Breakers on July 18, 2013. The team's final home match in New York City was a 23–15 overtime loss to the Washington Kastles on July 23, 2013.

=== Sale of team and move to San Diego ===
On January 15, 2014, Claude Okin, CEO of the New York Sportimes announced that the franchise had been sold to businessman Russell Geyser and his minority partner Jack McGrory, and the team would be relocated to San Diego, California and renamed the San Diego Aviators. Okin said, "This is a bittersweet event for me personally. I am very glad to have found a motivated and able new owner for the franchise: a person who will be able to re-imagine it in another great tennis town – but I will miss my team."

== Season-by-season records ==
The following table shows regular season records, playoff results and titles won by the New York Sportimes franchise prior to its relocation to San Diego in 2014, and not including any results inherited as a result of the merger with the New York Buzz in 2011.

Year	Team Name	W	L	PCT	Playoff result	Titles won
2000	New York Hamptons	5	9	.357	Missed playoffs	
2001	New York Hamptons	7	7	.500	Missed playoffs	
2002	New York Hamptons	10	4	.714	Missed playoffs	
2003	New York Sportimes	7	7	.500	Missed playoffs	
2004	New York Sportimes	2	12	.143	Missed playoffs	
2005	New York Sportimes	9	5	.643	Won Eastern Conference Championship Match; Won WTT Final Match	WTT Champions; Eastern Conference Champions
2006	New York Sportimes	10	4	.714	Lost in WTT Semifinal Match	Eastern Conference Champions
2007	New York Sportimes	6	8	.429	Missed playoffs	
2008	New York Sportimes	10	4	.714	Lost in WTT Semifinal Match	
2009	New York Sportimes	10	4	.714	Lost in Eastern Conference Championship Match	
2010	New York Sportimes	9	5	.643	Won Eastern Conference Championship Match; Lost in WTT Final Match	Eastern Conference Champions
2011	New York Sportimes	7	7	.500	Missed playoffs	
2012	New York Sportimes	9	5	.643	Lost in Eastern Conference Championship Match	
2013	New York Sportimes	4	10	.286	Missed playoffs	
Totals		105	91	.536	WTT Finals: 1 win, 1 loss, .500; All Playoff Matches: 3 wins, 5 losses, .375	WTT Champions – 1 (2005); Eastern Conference Champions – 3 (2005, 2006, 2010); Best regular-season record in WTT – 0

== Home courts ==
The following table shows home courts used by the New York Sportimes franchise prior to prior to its relocation to San Diego in 2014, and not including any matches played by the New York Buzz prior to the merger of the two teams in 2011.

Venue	Location	Duration		Notes
Venue	Location	Start	End	Notes
Sportime Quogue	East Quogue, New York	2000	2001	Primary home venue
Amagansett-East Side Tennis Club	Amagansett, New York	2002	2002	Primary home venue
Sportime Harbor Island	Mamaroneck, New York	2003	2008	Primary home venue
Sportime Stadium at Randall's Island (Note: The team played home matches in both New York City and the Capital District from 2011 to 2013, after the merger with the New York Buzz. Over those three seasons, 12 home matches were played at Sportime Stadium at Randall's Island, seven were played at SEFCU Arena and two were played at McDonough Sports Complex.)	New York City	2009	2013	Primary home venue
SEFCU Arena	Albany, New York	2011	2011	Primary home venue
McDonough Sports Complex	Troy, New York	2012	2012	Primary home venue
SEFCU Arena	Albany, New York	2013	2013	Primary home venue

== Individual honors ==
The following table shows individual honors bestowed upon players and coaches of the New York Sportimes franchise prior to its relocation to San Diego in 2014, and not including any awarded to players and coaches of the New York Buzz prior to the merger of the two teams in 2011.

Year	Player/Coach	Award
2002	Katarina Srebotnik	Female Most Valuable Player
2003	Bea Bielik	Female Rookie of the Year
2005	Martina Hingis	Championship Most Valuable Player
2006	David Martin	Male Rookie of the Year
2007	Jesse Witten	Male Rookie of the Year
2012	Martina Hingis	Female Most Valuable Player

== Hall of Fame players ==
The following players who are enshrined in the International Tennis Hall of Fame played for the New York Sportimes franchise prior to its relocation to San Diego in 2014, and not including any players who played the New York Buzz prior to the merger of the two teams in 2011.

- John McEnroe 2001–2003, 2005–2013
- Monica Seles 2004
- Martina Hingis 2005–2006, 2011–2012

== See also ==
- World TeamTennis
- San Diego Aviators
- New York Buzz
- New York Apples
