= Kansas City Explorers =

Tennis team in Missouri, US, 1993–2001

- Founded: 1993
- Folded: January 13, 2016
- League: World TeamTennis
- Team history: Kansas City Explorers; 1993–2012; Texas Wild; 2013–2014; California Dream; 2015
- Based in: Kansas City, Missouri
- Stadium: Barney Allis Plaza
- Colors: Navy Blue, Yellow, Green
- Head coach: Brent Haygarth
- Championships: 2010
- Conference titles: Western Conference Titles: 2008, 2010

The Kansas City Explorers were a World TeamTennis team that played at the Barney Allis Plaza in downtown Kansas City, Missouri, US. The team also played in Kemper Arena from 1993 until 2001. Following the 2012 season, it was announced that the Explorers would be moving to Irving, Texas and renamed the Texas Wild). The move followed the team's twentieth season in Kansas City.

In 2015, the Wild moved to Citrus Heights, California and was renamed the California Dream.

== Championships ==
In 2010, World TeamTennis awarded the Championship Game to Kansas City. The Kansas City Explorers & New York Sportimes were the two finalists, with the Explorers taking the victory on their home court by a score of 21–18. It was the first time the Championship Game had been played in Kansas City.
