= Springfield Lasers =

World TeamTennis professional team

- Sport: Team tennis
- Founded: 1996
- League: World TeamTennis
- Team history: Springfield Lasers; 1996–present
- Based in: Springfield, Missouri
- Stadium: Mediacom Stadium at Cooper Tennis Complex
- Colors: Kingfisher daisy and deep sky blue Alternate: Han violet-blue and bright turquoise
- Owner: Springfield-Greene County Park Board
- Head coach: John-Laffnie de Jager
- Championships: 2 (2018, 2019)

The Springfield Lasers was a World TeamTennis franchise. The franchise was purchased and donated to the city of Springfield, Missouri by the Cooper family in 1996. They played their home matches at Mediacom Stadium at Cooper Tennis Complex. They have not played since 2022.

== History ==
The team advanced to the league final in 1999, 2001, 2009, 2013, 2014, 2018 and 2019, and only in the last 2 years have they won the championship. In 2010, the Lasers had the best regular season record (10–4) in World TeamTennis and advanced to the WTT Western Conference Championship but lost to the Kansas City Explorers, 20 to 17. The Lasers faced the Philadelphia Freedoms in the 2018 WTT Championship match on August 5, 2018. The Lasers defeated the Freedoms 19–18 for their first WTT Championship in team history. They retained their title in 2019 with a win over the New York Empire in the final.

Lasers logo used through the 2014 season.

In 2003, the Lasers made slight modifications to their team logo. The words "Springfield" and "tennis" were also relocated. Affair purple ( ) was replaced with kingfisher daisy, a deeper shade of purple. Pacific blue ( ) was also replaced with deep sky blue. At the same time, the Lasers began using an alternate logo with the same design but a different color scheme. In place of kingfisher daisy was Han violet-blue ( ), and bright turquoise ( ) appears where deep sky blue is seen in the main logo. They signed John Isner for the 2015 and 2016 seasons.

The league and the Lasers went on hiatus in 2020 due to the COVID-19 pandemic in the United States but resumed playing in a central location. In 2022, They were approved to return to play back in Springfield in 2023. However, the league did not play and provided no information as to if the league had folded or was on hiatus again.

== Current roster ==
- (South Africa) John-Laffnie de Jager, head coach
- (United States) Hayley Carter
- (Belarus) Olga Govortsova
- (United States) Mitchell Krueger
- (Sweden) Robert Lindstedt
- (United States) Caty McNally
- (Netherlands) Jean-Julien Rojer

As of April 6, 2021
