= Sacramento Capitals =

- Founded: 1988
- League: World TeamTennis
- Team history: Sacramento Capitals; 1988–2013
- Based in: Citrus Heights, California
- Stadium: Capitals Stadium at the Sunrise Marketplace Outdoor Pavilion
- Colors: Red, Navy, and Yellow
- Owner: Deepal Wannakuwatte and Ramey Osborne, Managing General Partner
- Head coach: Wayne Bryan
- Manager: Jayna Osborne
- Championships: 1997, 1998, 1999, 2000, 2002, 2007

The Sacramento Capitals were a team in World TeamTennis that competed from 1988 through 2013.

The Capitals won six championships, including four straight from 1997 to 2000. The other titles came in 2002 and 2007.

For the 2012 World TeamTennis season, the team returned to play its home matches at Capitals Stadium at Sunrise Mall. In previous years, they called the following venues home: The Westfield Galleria at Roseville, Gold River Racquet Club in Gold River, and the original ARCO Arena in the Natomas area.

== Move to Las Vegas ==
On February 4, 2014, the Capitals, after 28 seasons in Sacramento, announced their move to Las Vegas. The team was renamed the Las Vegas Neon. The new Las Vegas team was shut down a few weeks later, before it even started after owner Deepal Wannakuwatte was arrested for running a Ponzi scheme.

== See also ==
- World TeamTennis
