= Boston Lobsters =

Team tennis franchise (2005–2015)

- Founded: 2005
- Folded: February 17, 2016
- League: World TeamTennis
- Team history: Boston Lobsters; 1974–1978, 2005–2015
- Based in: Manchester, Massachusetts, U.S.
- Stadium: Boston Lobsters Tennis Center at the Manchester Athletic Club
- Colors: Black, Venetian Red
- Head coach: Robert Greene
- Championships: None

The Boston Lobsters were a World TeamTennis team based in Boston, Massachusetts. The Boston Lobsters played home matches at the Walter Brown Arena, Boston University, in Boston, MA.

The most recent Boston Lobsters were a reincarnation of two previous WTT teams. The original Lobsters were a charter member of the league in 1974, and folded after just one season. The second Lobsters team were also a charter member of WTT in 1974, founded as the Philadelphia Freedoms. After the original Lobsters folded, businessman Robert Kraft purchased the Freedoms and moved them to Boston, renaming them the Lobsters. The second Lobsters team played in Boston for four seasons (1975–1978) before folding at the end of the 1978 season. WTT suspended operations shortly thereafter.

In 2005, local Boston businessman Bahar Uttam relaunched the team. The Lobsters made the Mylan WTT league's playoffs four times. In 2015, Uttam retired from the ownership position and the league took over operations of the Lobsters while seeking new local ownership. On February 17, 2016, WTT announced that the Lobsters would cease operations and were subsequently replaced with a new franchise called the New York Empire.

In 2025, the Australian tennis team "LobStars" flying under the Boston Lobsters logo, won Tennis Australia's 2025 Country Week tennis tournament held in Swan Hill, Victoria. The section 12 team defeated Leongatha 2-1 to take the trophy. The Country Week tournament is regarded as the largest annual grass court competition in the world with 1200 competitors and 222 teams.

== 2015 squad ==
- (United States) Jan-Michael Gambill, Head Coach
- (Canada) Eugenie Bouchard
- (United States) Chase Buchanan
- (United States) Irina Falconi
- (United States) Scott Lipsky
- (Spain) Arantxa Parra Santonja

== See also ==
- World TeamTennis
- Boston Lobsters (1974)
- Boston Lobsters (1974–1978)
