= 2016 Philadelphia Freedoms season =

- World TeamTennis: 4th place

Record
- 2016 record: 7 wins, 5 losses
- Home record: 4 wins, 2 losses
- Road record: 3 wins, 3 losses
- Games won–lost: 238–230

Team info
- Owner(s): Billie Jean King
- General manager: Barbara Perry
- Coach: Josh Cohen
- Stadium: The Pavilion (capacity: 3,500)

The 2016 Philadelphia Freedoms season was the 16th season of the franchise (in its current incarnation) in World TeamTennis (WTT).

The Freedoms finished fourth in WTT, narrowly losing a standings tiebreaker for third place, with a record of 7 wins and 5 losses and missed the postseason for the first time since 2013. The Freedoms were led by WTT Male Rookie of the Year Fabrice Martin.

== Season recap ==
=== Draft ===
At the WTT Draft on March 25, 2016, the Freedoms selected Caroline Wozniacki with the first pick in the marquee player portion of the draft. They passed on making a second-round marquee selection. In the roster portion of the draft, the Freedoms did not protect any players from their 2015 squad including 2014 WTT Male Most Valuable Player Marcelo Melo. They selected Lukáš Lacko, Daria Kasatkina, Fabrice Martin and Naomi Broady as roster players in the first four rounds. In addition to Melo, the Freedoms left Taylor Townsend, Robby Ginepri, Liezel Huber, Asia Muhammad, Abigail Spears and Coco Vandeweghe unprotected. In the fifth round, the Freedoms selected roster-exempt player Donald Young.

=== Crawford replaces Kasatkina ===
On July 6, 2016, the Freedoms announced they had signed Samantha Crawford to replace Daria Kasatkina, who had been selected to represent Russia at the 2016 Summer Olympics.

=== A solid start ===
The Freedoms opened their season on July 31, 2016, with a 23–17 road win against the Springfield Lasers. Lukáš Lacko and Fabrice Martin won the opening set of men's doubles, 5–3. After the Lasers won the second and third sets in tiebreakers to tie the match at 13 all, Naomi Broady and Samantha Crawford dominated all three of their service games, never facing a break point, while converting two breaks against Michaëlla Krajicek and Pauline Parmentier for a 5–1 women's doubles set win that gave the Freedoms an 18–14 lead. Broady and Martin closed out the victory by taking the mixed doubles set, 5–3.

The following evening, the Freedoms were in New York City for a match with the New York Empire. After dropping the opening set, the Freedoms won the next three sets to take command of the match. Caroline Wozniacki and Broady won a tiebreaker in women's doubles after trading breaks with Christina McHale and María Irigoyen. Broady and Martin took the third set of mixed doubles, 5–3. Wozniacki dominated McHale in the fourth set of women's singles, 5–0, winning 20 of the 25 points played, to give the Freedoms a 17–12 lead. After the teams traded breaks in the final set of men's doubles, Guido Pella and Neal Skupski won a tiebreaker that forced extended play with the Freedoms leading 21–17. Pella and Skupski broke Lacko and Martin in the first game of extended play and held serve in the second to cut the Freedoms' lead to 21–19. However, Lacko and Martin held serve in the third game to close out a 22–19 victory.

After two road wins to start their season, the Freedoms played their home opener against the Lasers on August 2, 2016, which included an Olympic send-off party for Wozniacki. She was selected as Denmark's flag bearer for the opening ceremony. The Freedoms found themselves behind, 10–5, early in the match after the Lasers won the first two sets. Lacko and Martin held all four of their service games and converted a break point for a 5–2 set win in the third set of men's doubles. Wozniacki followed with a 5–1 set win in women's singles that gave the Freedoms a 15–13 lead. Broady and Martin took a 5–3 set win in mixed doubles to seal a 20–16 win.

The following evening, the Freedoms found themselves on the road against the five-time defending WTT champion Washington Kastles. Both teams entered the match with 3 wins and 0 losses. Lacko and Martin secured an early break to take a 3–1 lead in the opening set of men's doubles. Leander Paes and John-Patrick Smith broke back and tied the set at 3 all. But Lacko and Martin managed another break and took the set, 5–3. Broady and Martin took the second set of mixed doubles in a tiebreaker. Lacko won the men's singles set, 5–3, to give the Freedoms a 15–10 halftime lead. After dropping the women's doubles set, the Freedoms handed an 18–15 lead to Broady who faced Madison Brengle in the final set of women's singles. Broady successfully defended the only break point she faced in her four service games and converted a break against Brengle's serve to take the set, 5–3, and secure a 23–18 victory for the Freedoms. Brengle, who had only played singles this season before the start of play, entered the match having won all three of her sets by a combined score a 15–2. The win gave the Freedoms 4 wins and 0 losses and left them as the only undefeated team in WTT.

=== Four consecutive losses ===
The Freedoms returned home atop the WTT standings to face the winless Springfield Lasers, a team they had already beaten twice, on August 4, 2016. The Lasers won four of the five sets, two in tiebreakers, and went on to a 24–19 victory that handed the Freedom their first loss of the season. Two nights later, in the back end of a home-and-home series, the Lasers won three of the five sets played and defeated the Freedoms again, 23–18 in extended play.

The Freedoms' West Coast trip proved to be a struggle, as they lost to both the Orange County Breakers and the San Diego Aviators and saw their record drop to 4 wins and 4 losses.

=== Stretch run ===
On August 9, 2016, the Freedoms announced they had re-signed Coco Vandeweghe as a wildcard player.

The Freedoms took their four-match losing streak home where they met the New York Empire on August 10, 2016. The match opened with Donald Young and Fabrice Martin facing Andy Roddick and Neal Skupski. Both teams held three service games and broke once to send the set to a tiebreaker. Empire coach Patrick McEnroe substituted 2016 Wimbledon hero Marcus Willis for Skupski in the tiebreaker, but the Freedoms prevailed. After Christina McHale took the first three games of the women's singles set from Naomi Broady, the Freedoms substituted Samantha Crawford for Broady. McHale broke Crawford in her service game and took the set, 5–0, to give the Empire a 9–5 lead. The Freedoms regained the lead at 10–9, when Martin and Broady took the mixed doubles set, 5–0, from Skupski and McHale, who had substituted for María Irigoyen, after the Empire fell behind, 0–3. McHale and Irigoyen won 21 of the 32 points played against Broady and Crawford in the women's doubles set for a 5–1 victory that gave the Empire a 14–11 lead. In the final set, Young held his four service games and broke Roddick once for a 5–2 men's singles set win that tied the match at 16 all and sent it to a super tiebreaker. Young took the super tiebreaker, 7–3, to give the Freedoms a 17–16 victory and put an end to their losing streak.

The following evening, the Freedoms met the Washington Kastles at home in an atmosphere quite different from the teams' previous encounter. Just eight days earlier, the Freedoms prevailed in a matchup of WTT's only two undefeated teams. Now the Freedoms were 5–4, and the Kastles were 4–5 and facing elimination. The five-time defending WTT champions won the first three sets to gain a 15–9 lead before exacting their revenge for the home loss they suffered at the hands of the Freedoms. The 24–18 Kastles victory gave both teams 5 wins and 5 losses and put them both on the brink of elimination.

On August 12, 2016, the Freedoms hosted the Orange County Breakers, who entered the match with 8 wins and 2 losses and having already clinched a spot in the WTT Finals. Young and Martin led the Freedoms by opening the match with a 5–2 set win in men's doubles. Martin then teamed with Broady to take the third set of mixed doubles in a tiebreaker and give the Freedoms a 13–11 lead at halftime. Young closed out a 21–18 victory by taking the final set of men's singles, 5–2, over Dennis Novikov. The set was much closer than it might appear. Young successfully defended all seven break points he faced while converting one of on two break-point opportunities he had. Total points won in the set favored Young by only 21–20. Despite winning to stave off elimination, the Freedoms postseason aspirations vanished, when the San Diego Aviators defeated the Empire, 24–16, to clinch the second spot in the WTT Finals.

A win in the season's final match gave the Freedoms a record of 7 wins and 5 losses, identical to that of the Kastles. Since the teams split their two regular-season meetings, the tie for third place in the standings was broken based on games won in those head-to-head matches, which favored the Kastles, 42–41.

=== Rookie of the Year Award ===
Fabrice Martin was named 2016 WTT Male Rookie of the Year. Martin was tied for first in the league with teammate Naomi Broady in winning percentage in mixed doubles and was also fourth in men's doubles.

== Event chronology ==
- March 25, 2016: The Freedoms selected Caroline Wozniacki, Lukáš Lacko, Daria Kasatkina, Fabrice Martin, Naomi Broady and Donald Young at the WTT Draft. The Freedoms left Taylor Townsend, Marcelo Melo, Robby Ginepri, Liezel Huber, Asia Muhammad, Abigail Spears and Coco Vandeweghe unprotected.
- July 6, 2016: The Freedoms signed Samantha Crawford.
- August 9, 2016: The Freedoms re-signed Coco Vandeweghe as a wildcard player.
- August 12, 2016: With a record of 6 wins and 5 losses, the Freedoms were eliminated from postseason contention when the San Diego Aviators defeated the New York Empire, 24–16. It is the first time they have missed the postseason since 2013.

== Draft picks ==
With the California Dream franchise terminated by WTT, the Freedoms were the only returning conference championship loser from 2015, and selected third from the bottom (fourth) in each round of the draft. WTT conducted its 2016 Draft on March 25, in Key Biscayne, Florida. The selections made by the Freedoms are shown in the table below.

Draft type	Round	No.	Overall	Player chosen	Prot?	Notes
Marquee	1	4	4	(Denmark) Caroline Wozniacki	N	
Marquee	2	4	10	Pass	–	
Roster	1	4	4	(Slovakia) Lukáš Lacko	N	
Roster	2	4	10	(Russia) Daria Kasatkina	N	
Roster	3	4	16	(France) Fabrice Martin	N	
Roster	4	4	22	(United Kingdom) Naomi Broady	N	
Roster	5	4	28	(United States) Donald Young	N	Roster-Exempt

== Match log ==
Legend
Freedoms Win	Freedoms Loss
Home team in CAPS

Match	Date	Venue and location	Result and details	Record
1	July 31	Mediacom Stadium at Cooper Tennis Complex; Springfield, Missouri	Philadelphia Freedoms 23, SPRINGFIELD LASERS 17 * MD: Lukáš Lacko/Fabrice Martin (Freedoms) 5, Jean Andersen/Benjamin Becker (Lasers) 3 * WS: Pauline Parmentier (Lasers) 5, Naomi Broady (Freedoms) 4 * MS: Benjamin Becker (Lasers) 5, Lukáš Lacko (Freedoms) 4 * WD: Naomi Broady/Samantha Crawford (Freedoms) 5, Michaëlla Krajicek/Pauline Parmentier (Lasers) 1 * XD: Naomi Broady/Fabrice Martin (Freedoms) 5, Michaëlla Krajicek/Jean Andersen (Lasers) 3	1–0
2	August 1	Forest Hills Stadium; New York City, New York	Philadelphia Freedoms 22, NEW YORK EMPIRE 19 (extended play) * MS: Guido Pella (Empire) 5, Lukáš Lacko (Freedoms) 2 * WD: Caroline Wozniacki/Naomi Broady (Freedoms) 5, Christina McHale/María Irigoyen (Empire) 4 * XD: Naomi Broady/Fabrice Martin (Freedoms) 5, María Irigoyen/Neal Skupski (Empire) 3 * WS: Caroline Wozniacki (Freedoms) 5, Christina McHale (Empire) 0 * MD: Guido Pella/Neal Skupski (Empire) 5, Lukáš Lacko/Fabrice Martin (Freedoms) 4 * EP - MD: Guido Pella/Neal Skupski (Empire) 2, Lukáš Lacko/Fabrice Martin (Freedoms) 1	2–0
3	August 2	The Pavilion; Radnor Township, Pennsylvania	PHILADELPHIA FREEDOMS 20, Springfield Lasers 16 * MS: Benjamin Becker (Lasers) 5, Lukáš Lacko (Freedoms) 3 * WD: Michaëlla Krajicek/Pauline Parmentier (Lasers) 5, Caroline Wozniacki/Naomi Broady (Freedoms) 2 * MD: Lukáš Lacko/Fabrice Martin (Freedoms) 5, Jean Andersen/Benjamin Becker (Lasers) 2 * WS: Caroline Wozniacki (Freedoms) 5, Pauline Parmentier (Lasers) 1 * XD: Naomi Broady/Fabrice Martin (Freedoms) 5, Michaëlla Krajicek/Jean Andersen (Lasers) 3	3–0
4	August 3	Kastles Stadium at the Charles E. Smith Center; Washington, District of Columbia	Philadelphia Freedoms 23, WASHINGTON KASTLES 18 * MD: Lukáš Lacko/Fabrice Martin (Freedoms) 5, Leander Paes/John-Patrick Smith (Kastles) 3 * XD: Naomi Broady/Fabrice Martin (Freedoms) 5, Andreja Klepač/Leander Paes (Kastles) 4 * MS: Lukáš Lacko (Freedoms) 5, John-Patrick Smith (Kastles) 3 * WD: Madison Brengle/Andreja Klepač (Kastles) 5, Naomi Broady/Samantha Crawford (Freedoms) 3 * WS: Naomi Broady (Freedoms) 5, Madison Brengle (Kastles) 3	4–0
5	August 4	The Pavilion; Radnor Township, Pennsylvania	Springfield Lasers 24, PHILADELPHIA FREEDOMS 19 * MD: Jean Andersen/Benjamin Becker (Lasers) 5, Lukáš Lacko/Fabrice Martin (Freedoms) 4 * WD: Michaëlla Krajicek/Pauline Parmentier (Lasers) 5, Naomi Broady/Samantha Crawford (Freedoms) 3 * MS: Lukáš Lacko (Freedoms) 5, Benjamin Becker (Lasers) 4 * WS: Pauline Parmentier (Lasers) 5, Naomi Broady (Freedoms) 4 * XD: Benjamin Becker/Michaëlla Krajicek (Lasers) 5, Naomi Broady/Fabrice Martin (Freedoms) 3	4–1
6	August 6	Mediacom Stadium at Cooper Tennis Complex; Springfield, Missouri	SPRINGFIELD LASERS 23, Philadelphia Freedoms 18 (extended play) * MD: Fabrice Martin/Lukáš Lacko (Freedoms) 5, Benjamin Becker/Jean Andersen (Lasers) 4 * WD: Michaëlla Krajicek/Pauline Parmentier (Lasers) 5, Naomi Broady/Samantha Crawford (Freedoms) 3 * XD: Benjamin Becker/Michaëlla Krajicek (Lasers) 5, Fabrice Martin/Naomi Broady (Freedoms) 3 * WS: Michaëlla Krajicek (Lasers) 5, Samantha Crawford (Freedoms) 2 * MS: Lukáš Lacko (Freedoms) 5, Benjamin Becker (Lasers) 3 * EP - MS: Benjamin Becker (Lasers) 1, Lukáš Lacko (Freedoms) 0	4–2
7	August 7	Breakers Stadium at the Newport Beach Tennis Club; Newport Beach, California	ORANGE COUNTY BREAKERS 23, Philadelphia Freedoms 17 * MD: Lukáš Lacko/Fabrice Martin (Freedoms) 5, Scott Lipsky/Dennis Novikov (Breakers) 4 * WS: Nicole Gibbs (Breakers) 5, Naomi Broady (Freedoms) 3 * MS: Dennis Novikov (Breakers) 5, Lukáš Lacko (Freedoms) 2 * XD: Naomi Broady/Fabrice Martin (Freedoms) 5, Alla Kudryavtseva/Scott Lipsky (Breakers) 4 * WD: Nicole Gibbs/Alla Kudryavtseva (Breakers) 5, Naomi Broady/Samantha Crawford (Freedoms) 2	4–3
8	August 8	Omni La Costa Resort and Spa; Carlsbad, California	SAN DIEGO AVIATORS 23, Philadelphia Freedoms 15 (extended play) * MS: Ryan Harrison (Aviators) 5, Lukáš Lacko (Freedoms) 2 * WS: Shelby Rogers (Aviators) 5, Naomi Broady (Freedoms) 0 *** Naomi Broady substituted for Samantha Crawford at 0–3 * MD: Ryan Harrison/Raven Klaasen (Aviators) 5, Lukáš Lacko/Fabrice Martin (Freedoms) 3 * WD: Naomi Broady/Samantha Crawford (Freedoms) 5, Darija Jurak/Shelby Rogers (Aviators) 4 * XD: Fabrice Martin/Naomi Broady (Freedoms) 5, Raven Klaasen/Darija Jurak (Aviators) 3 * EP - XD: Raven Klaasen/Darija Jurak (Aviators) 1, Fabrice Martin/Naomi Broady (Freedoms) 0	4–4
9	August 10	The Pavilion; Radnor Township, Pennsylvania	PHILADELPHIA FREEDOMS 17, New York Empire 16 (super tiebreaker, 7–3) * MD: Fabrice Martin/Donald Young (Freedoms) 5, Andy Roddick/Marcus Willis (Empire) 4 *** Marcus Willis substituted for Neal Skupski at 4–4 * WS: Christina McHale (Empire) 5, Samantha Crawford (Freedoms) 0 *** Samantha Crawford substituted for Naomi Broady at 0–3 * XD: Naomi Broady/Fabrice Martin (Freedoms) 5, Christina McHale/Neal Skupski (Empire) 0 *** Christina McHale substituted for María Irigoyen at 0–3 * WD: María Irigoyen/Christina McHale (Empire) 5, Naomi Broady/Samantha Crawford (Freedoms) 1 * MS: Donald Young (Freedoms) 5, Andy Roddick (Empire) 2 * STB - MS: Donald Young (Freedoms) 7, Andy Roddick (Empire) 3	5–4
10	August 11	The Pavilion; Radnor Township, Pennsylvania	Washington Kastles 24, PHILADELPHIA FREEDOMS 18 * MD: Sam Groth/Treat Huey (Kastles) 5, Fabrice Martin/Donald Young (Freedoms) 4 * WS: Madison Brengle (Kastles) 5, Naomi Broady (Freedoms) 2 * MS: Sam Groth (Kastles) 5, Donald Young (Freedoms) 3 * WD: Naomi Broady/Samantha Crawford (Freedoms) 5, Madison Brengle/Andreja Klepač (Kastles) 4 * XD: Treat Huey/Andreja Klepač (Kastles) 5, Fabrice Martin/Naomi Broady (Freedoms) 4	5–5
11	August 12	The Pavilion; Radnor Township, Pennsylvania	PHILADELPHIA FREEDOMS 21, Orange County Breakers 18 * MD: Fabrice Martin/Donald Young (Freedoms) 5, Scott Lipsky/Dennis Novikov (Breakers) 2 * WD: Nicole Gibbs/Alla Kudryavtseva (Breakers) 5, Naomi Broady/Coco Vandeweghe (Freedoms) 3 * XD: Naomi Broady/Fabrice Martin (Freedoms) 5, Alla Kudryavtseva/Scott Lipsky (Breakers) 4 * WS: Nicole Gibbs (Breakers) 5, Coco Vandeweghe (Freedoms) 3 * MS: Donald Young (Freedoms) 5, Dennis Novikov (Breakers) 2	6–5
12	August 13	The Pavilion; Radnor Township, Pennsylvania	PHILADELPHIA FREEDOMS 25, San Diego Aviators 9 * XD: Naomi Broady/Fabrice Martin (Freedoms) 5, Darija Jurak/Raven Klaasen (Aviators) 2 * WD: Naomi Broady/Coco Vandeweghe (Freedoms) 5, Darija Jurak/Shelby Rogers (Aviators) 1 * MD: Fabrice Martin/Donald Young (Freedoms) 5, Raven Klaasen/Nick Monroe (Aviators) 3 * WS: Coco Vandeweghe (Freedoms) 5, Shelby Rogers (Aviators) 2 * MS: Donald Young (Freedoms) 5, Nick Monroe (Aviators) 1	7–5

== Team personnel ==
=== On-court personnel ===
- (United States) Josh Cohen – Head Coach
- (United Kingdom) Naomi Broady
- (United States) Samantha Crawford
- (Russia) Daria Kasatkina (Note: Schedule conflict with Olympics, did not play.)
- (Slovakia) Lukáš Lacko
- (France) Fabrice Martin
- (United States) Coco Vandeweghe
- (Denmark) Caroline Wozniacki
- (United States) Donald Young

=== Front office ===
- Billie Jean King – Owner
- Barbara Perry – General Manager

== Statistics ==
Players are listed in order of their game-winning percentage provided they played in at least 40% of the Freedoms' games in that event, which is the WTT minimum for qualification for league leaders in individual statistical categories.

Men's singles

Player	GP	GW	GL	PCT	A	DF	BPW	BPP	BP%	3APW	3APP	3AP%
Lukáš Lacko	64	28	36	.438	10	5	5	15	.333	4	8	.500
Donald Young	29	19	10	.655	5	2	4	13	.308	7	10	.700
Total	93	47	46	.505	15	7	9	28	.321	11	18	.611

Women's singles

Player	GP	GW	GL	PCT	A	DF	BPW	BPP	BP%	3APW	3APP	3AP%
Naomi Broady	46	18	28	.391	11	12	6	16	.375	4	11	.364
Caroline Wozniacki	11	10	1	.909	1	1	4	6	.667	3	3	1.000
Coco Vandeweghe	15	8	7	.533	4	1	3	8	.375	1	4	.250
Samantha Crawford	12	2	10	.167	3	1	0	1	.000	1	2	.500
Total	84	38	46	.452	19	15	13	31	.419	9	20	.450

Men's doubles

Player	GP	GW	GL	PCT	A	DF	BPW	BPP	BP%	3APW	3APP	3AP%
Fabrice Martin	103	56	47	.544	10	3	11	38	.289	10	23	.435
Lukáš Lacko	70	37	33	.529	3	4	6	21	.286	7	16	.438
Donald Young	33	19	14	.576	4	3	5	17	.294	3	7	.429
Total	103	56	47	.544	17	10	11	38	.289	10	23	.435

Women's doubles

Player	GP	GW	GL	PCT	A	DF	BPW	BPP	BP%	3APW	3APP	3AP%
Naomi Broady	91	42	49	.462	11	10	8	25	.320	6	18	.333
Samantha Crawford	61	27	34	.443	5	7	3	14	.214	2	8	.250
Coco Vandeweghe	14	8	6	.571	0	2	4	8	.500	2	5	.400
Caroline Wozniacki	16	7	9	.438	0	0	1	3	.333	2	5	.400
Total	91	42	49	.462	16	19	8	25	.320	6	18	.333

Mixed doubles

Player	GP	GW	GL	PCT	A	DF	BPW	BPP	BP%	3APW	3APP	3AP%
Naomi Broady	97	55	42	.567	11	16	12	19	.632	7	13	.538
Fabrice Martin	97	55	42	.567	14	2	12	19	.632	7	13	.538
Total	97	55	42	.567	25	18	12	19	.632	7	13	.538

Team totals

Event	GP	GW	GL	PCT	A	DF	BPW	BPP	BP%	3APW	3APP	3AP%
Men's singles	93	47	46	.505	15	7	9	28	.321	11	18	.611
Women's singles	84	38	46	.452	19	15	13	31	.419	9	20	.450
Men's doubles	103	56	47	.544	17	10	11	38	.289	10	23	.435
Women's doubles	91	42	49	.462	16	19	8	25	.320	6	18	.333
Mixed doubles	97	55	42	.567	25	18	12	19	.632	7	13	.538
Total	468	238	230	.509	92	69	53	141	.376	43	92	.467

== Transactions ==
- March 25, 2016: The Freedoms selected Caroline Wozniacki, Lukáš Lacko, Daria Kasatkina, Fabrice Martin, Naomi Broady and Donald Young at the WTT Draft. The Freedoms left Taylor Townsend, Marcelo Melo, Robby Ginepri, Liezel Huber, Asia Muhammad, Abigail Spears and Coco Vandeweghe unprotected.
- July 6, 2016: The Freedoms signed Samantha Crawford.
- August 9, 2016: The Freedoms re-signed Coco Vandeweghe as a wildcard player.

== Individual honors and achievements ==
Fabrice Martin was named 2016 WTT Male Rookie of the Year. Martin was tied for first in the league with teammate Naomi Broady in winning percentage in mixed doubles and was also fourth in men's doubles.

Lukáš Lacko was fifth in WTT in winning percentage in men's doubles.

== See also ==
- Sports in Philadelphia
