= 2016 Orange County Breakers season =

- World TeamTennis: 2nd place

Record
- 2016 record: 8 wins, 4 losses
- Home record: 6 wins, 0 losses
- Road record: 2 wins, 4 losses
- Games won–lost: 252–216

Team info
- Owner(s): Lorne Abony
- General manager: Allen Hardison
- Coach: Rick Leach
- Stadium: Breakers Stadium at the Newport Beach Tennis Club (capacity: 1,250)

The 2016 Orange County Breakers season was the 14th season of the franchise in World TeamTennis (WTT) and its 12th season in Orange County, California, the first after returning from playing two seasons in Greater Austin, Texas as the Austin Aces.

The Breakers finished second in WTT with 8 wins and 4 losses and lost in the WTT Finals to the San Diego Aviators, 25–14 in extended play. The Breakers were led by WTT Female Most Valuable Player Nicole Gibbs.

== Season recap ==
=== Move back to Orange County ===
On December 14, 2015, Austin Aces owner Lorne Abony announced that the team had been unable to find a suitable permanent venue and would move back to Orange County, California for the 2016 season and be renamed the Orange County Breakers. The Aces officially reported their average home attendance in 2014, as 2,155. However, general manager Allen Hardison said that the real figure may have been closer to 1,300. In 2015, the average attendance was approximately 950, even though the first 1,000 fans at the gates for the Western Conference Championship Match who had an online code were admitted for free. Hardison was complimentary of the staffs at both Cedar Park Center and Gregory Gymnasium, and he also noted that the fans who supported the Aces were "some of the best in the league." Hardison said that in order for a WTT franchise to survive, it has to have a venue that meets established criteria for location, venue type and availability, and that ideally offers an outdoor setting. Although the team's new home court was not immediately announced, officials with a desirable venue in Orange County had reportedly reached out to the Aces to lure them back.

On January 27, 2016, the Breakers announced that they would play their 2016 home matches at Breakers Stadium at the Newport Beach Tennis Club. "We are thrilled that the Breakers have found an outdoor venue to call home at the Newport Beach Tennis Club. The Breakers have a long history in this city, and Breakers Stadium at Newport Beach Tennis Club will offer tennis fans the perfect setting to watch world-class tennis," said Hardison. "Bringing the Breakers and Mylan World TeamTennis to the Newport Beach Tennis Club is something that we have been looking into the past few years. Breakers matches will bring Newport Beach and Orange County residents access to some of the best tennis players on the tours. Our club is excited to be a part of that and play a role in bringing the Breakers and professional tennis back to Newport Beach," said Newport Beach Tennis Club owner Steve Joyce."

=== Roddick traded to New York ===
On February 17, 2016, WTT announced that the Breakers had traded former world number 1 male player Andy Roddick to the expansion New York Empire for undisclosed consideration.

=== Draft ===
At the WTT Draft on March 25, 2016, the Breakers traded their first-round selection in the marquee player portion of the draft to the Washington Kastles for undisclosed consideration. The Kastles used this pick to select Bob and Mike Bryan as a doubles team. The Breakers passed on making a selection in the second round of the marquee player portion of the draft. In the first two rounds of the roster player portion of the draft, the Breakers protected Nicole Gibbs and 2015 WTT Female Rookie of the Year Alla Kudryavtseva. In the third round, the Breakers selected Scott Lipsky, who played for the now-defunct Boston Lobsters in 2015, and left Jarmere Jenkins unprotected. In the fourth round, the Breakers selected Dennis Novikov and left 2015 WTT Male Most Valuable Player Teymuraz Gabashvili unprotected. The Breakers passed on selecting a roster-exempt player in the fifth round of the roster portion of the draft.

=== Steve Johnson returns to the Breakers ===
On April 29, 2016, the Breakers announced that they had re-signed Steve Johnson, a resident of nearby Redondo Beach, California, as a wildcard player. Johnson earned the WTT Male Rookie of the Year award playing for the Breakers in 2013.

=== A rivalry is born ===
The Breakers' return to Southern California opened with a four-game series against the San Diego Aviators. When the Breakers last called Orange County their home in 2013, the Aviators were known as the New York Sportimes. While the teams did not have any history as geographic rivals, the franchises did meet in the 2005 WTT Finals with the Sportimes earning the title with a 21–18 victory over the Newport Beach Breakers. The two franchises also boasted the best regular-season records in WTT over the past two seasons with the Aviators achieving the feat in 2014, and the Breakers, playing as the Austin Aces doing so in 2015.

The Aviators hosted the opening match on July 31, 2016. Dennis Novikov got the Breakers started by holding all four of his service games and converting one of three break-point opportunities against James Blake for a 5–3 set win in men's singles. Nicole Gibbs gave the Breakers a 10–5 lead, when she won the second set of women's singles. However, the Aviators regrouped and won the next two sets of men's and women's doubles to tie the match at 15 all. The teams exchanged breaks in the final set of mixed doubles, before Darija Jurak and Raven Klaasen won the set tiebreaker, 5–2, over Alla Kudryavtseva and Scott Lipsky to give the Aviators a 20–19 victory.

The following evening, the Breakers hosted the Aviators in their first home match in Orange County since 2013. Kudryavtseva and Lipsky immediately avenged their loss in the previous night's final set by taking the opening set of mixed doubles from Jurak and Klaasen, 5–2. Gibbs followed by winning the women's singles set in a tiebreaker to give the Breakers a 10–6 lead. The Aviators won the next two sets of men's and women's doubles to close the gap to 17–16. After the players exchanged breaks, Steve Johnson secured a 22–20 victory for the Breakers by winning a tiebreaker in men's singles over Ryan Harrison.

The teams returned to San Diego for the third match of their series on August 2, 2016. The Aviators won the first three sets to build a 15–5 lead. Gibbs and Kudryavtseva cut the lead to 18–10 with a 5–3 set win in women's doubles. Kudryavtseva then teamed with Lipsky to win a fifth-set tiebreaker in mixed doubles. However, the Aviators broke Kudryavtseva's serve in the first game of extended play to secure a 23–15 victory.

The following evening in Orange County, Lipsky and Novikov won all four of the 3-all points played, successfully defended all five break points they faced and converted their only break-point chance against Klaasen and Harrison to take the opening set of men's doubles, 5–2. The Aviators won the next three sets, two of them in tiebreakers, to take a 17–16 lead to the final set. Gibbs and Kudryavtseva came up with an early break and then held serve the rest of the way to take the women's doubles set, 5–2, and give the Breakers a 21–19 win. The four matches in four nights ended in a split and had quickly developed the feel of a rivalry. "It definitely starts to get a little personal," said Gibbs. "Things got a little feisty tonight, so it was a good night to bring the cameras. We were getting in each other's faces, and there were some big 'Come ons'. Definitely some emotional moments."

=== A winning streak and a spot in the final ===
Following their season-opening series with the Aviators, the Breakers had a day off to prepare for the second match of their five-match homestand against the five-time defending WTT champion Washington Kastles. The Kastles who visited Orange County on August 5, 2016, were a very different team from the one that won five WTT titles from 2011 through 2015, and started the 2016 season 4–0. They had suffered injuries to both Mardy Fish and Sam Querrey and lost Leander Paes, Martina Hingis and Anastasia Rodionova to Olympic duty. Hours before the match, the Kastles announced they had signed Bjorn Fratangelo and Ken Skupski as substitute players. The newly signed pair, both making their WTT debuts, opened the match by losing the men's doubles set to Scott Lipsky and Dennis Novikov, 5–2. Nicole Gibbs topped Madison Brengle in women's singles, 5–2, to give the Breakers a 10–4 lead. Novikov took the men's singles set from Fratangelo, 5–2, to increase the lead to 15–6 at halftime. Alla Kudryavtseva and Lipsky didn't face a break point while converting both of their own opportunities for a dominant 5–1 set win in mixed doubles in which they won 22 of the 32 points played. Gibbs and Kudryavtseva closed out the sweep of all five sets by taking women's doubles and giving the Breakers a 25–10 victory in the worst loss in the Kastles' franchise history.

The following evening, the Breakers hosted the expansion New York Empire and recognized the team's past. In a ceremony at halftime, former coach Trevor Kronemann became the first Breaker to be honored with a retired jersey. Kronemann coached the Breakers for seven seasons from 2007 through 2013. "You think all the humbling is over, and then something like this happens," said Kronemann. "It's a great honor. It's something that you don't think that you're going to accomplish. You never play the game for those reasons, but it really makes you reflect on what you've done, where you've been, the relationships, and it's a huge honor. Obviously, we've had some great players play here, and to be the first one is very humbling." The ceremony took place with the Breakers enjoying a 15–6 halftime lead for the second consecutive evening, having won the first three sets. Lipsky, Novikov, Gibbs and Kudryavtseva each won two events in a 25–8 rout of the Empire during which the teams only spent one hour and 15 minutes on the court.

The Breakers entered their August 7 home match with the Philadelphia Freedoms in a three-way tie for first place with the Freedoms and the Aviators at 4–2. After the Freedoms won the opening set of men's doubles in a tiebreaker, Gibbs and Novikov won the women's and men's singles to give the Breakers a 14–10 halftime lead. The Freedoms edged closer by winning another tiebreaker in mixed doubles. But Gibbs and Kudryavtseva closed out the match in women's doubles by converting their only break-point opportunity while not facing one on their own serve to give the Breakers a 23–17 victory.

The Breakers' homestand concluded with the first match of a home-and-home series against the Springfield Lasers on August 9, 2016. The Breakers won four of the five sets on their way to a 24–17 victory. Lipsky, Gibbs and Kudryavtseva each won two set as the Breakers completed their home schedule with a perfect 6–0 record. Gibbs earned a standing ovation from the home crowd, including owner Lorne Abony, when she hit several defensive shots in a long women's singles rally against Pauline Parmentier before finally winning the point on an overhead shot.

Despite losing three of the five sets the following evening in Springfield, the Breakers continued their winning streak led by the solid play of Gibbs who teamed with Kudryavtseva for a 5–1 set win in women's doubles and then won the women's singles, 5–3. After Novikov dropped a tiebreaker in the final set of men's doubles, he won the first game of extended play to secure a 22–19 victory over the Lasers.

On August 11, 2016, the Breakers visited the Empire at Forest Hills Stadium. After Kudryavtseva and Lipsky took the opening set of mixed doubles, the Empire won the women's doubles and men's singles set to take a 13–9 lead. Gibbs turned things around for the Breakers as she held in all three of her service games and broke the Empire twice for a 5–0 set win in women's singles that gave the Breakers a 14–13 lead. Lipsky and Novikov won a tiebreaker to take the fifth set of men's doubles and secure a 19–17 win. With their seventh straight victory, the Breakers clinched a berth in the WTT Finals for the second straight season, having lost the 2015 final playing as the Austin Aces.

=== A late stumble ===
The clinching win over the Empire put the Breakers alone atop the WTT standings with 8 wins and 2 losses, one match ahead of the San Diego Aviators, with each team having two matches to play. However, the Breakers lost their final two regular-season matches to the Philadelphia Freedoms and the Washington Kastles to fall to 8–4. The Aviators split their final two matches to also finish 8–4. With the teams having split their four matches during the regular season, the tie for first place was broken by games won in head-to-head matches, which favored the Aviators, 82–77. Finishing first meant the Aviators would be treated as the home team in the WTT Finals and have the right to choose the order of play.

=== Gibbs named MVP ===
Nicole Gibbs was named 2016 WTT Female Most Valuable Player. Gibbs was tied for first in the league with teammate Alla Kudryavtseva in winning percentage in women's doubles and was also second in women's singles.

=== WTT Finals ===
The Breakers met their new rivals, the San Diego Aviators, in the WTT Finals on August 26, 2016. The Aviators won the first four sets, all by 5–2 scores to take a 20–8 lead to the final set. Dennis Novikov won a tiebreaker against 2016 WTT Male Most Valuable Player Ryan Harrison in the final set of men's singles to send the match to extended play with the Aviators leading 24–13. Novikov held serve in the opening game of extended play but was unable to break Harrison's serve in the second game, giving the Aviators a 25–14 victory. It was the second straight year the Breakers' season ended with a loss in the WTT Finals.

== Event chronology ==
- December 14, 2015: The Austin Aces announced the team would move back to Orange County, California for the 2016 season and be renamed the Orange County Breakers.
- January 27, 2016: The Breakers announced they would play their 2016 home matches at Breakers Stadium at the Newport Beach Tennis Club.
- February 17, 2016: The Breakers traded Andy Roddick to the New York Empire for undisclosed consideration.
- March 25, 2016: The Breakers protected Nicole Gibbs and Alla Kudryavtseva and selected Scott Lipsky and Dennis Novikov at the WTT Draft. The Breakers left Jarmere Jenkins and Teymuraz Gabashvili unprotected.
- April 29, 2016: The Breakers signed Steve Johnson as a wildcard player.
- August 11, 2016: With a record of 8 wins and 2 losses, the Breakers clinched a berth in the WTT Finals for the second consecutive season when they defeated the New York Empire, 19–17.
- August 26, 2016: The Breakers lost in the WTT Finals to the San Diego Aviators, 25–14. It is the second straight year the Breakers' season ended with a loss in the WTT Finals.

== Draft picks ==
Since the Aces lost the WTT Final in 2015, the Breakers selected next to last in each round of the draft. WTT conducted its 2016 draft on March 25, in Key Biscayne, Florida. The Breakers traded their first-round selection in the marquee player portion of the draft to the Washington Kastles for undisclosed consideration. The selections made by the Breakers are shown in the table below.

Draft type	Round	No.	Overall	Player chosen	Prot?
Marquee	2	5	11	Pass	–
Roster	1	5	5	(United States) Nicole Gibbs	Y
Roster	2	5	11	(Russia) Alla Kudryavtseva	Y
Roster	3	5	17	(United States) Scott Lipsky	N
Roster	4	5	23	(United States) Dennis Novikov	N
Roster	5	5	29	Pass	–

== Match log ==
=== Regular season ===
Legend
Breakers Win	Breakers Loss
Home team in CAPS

Match	Date	Venue and location	Result and details	Record
1	July 31	Omni La Costa Resort and Spa; Carlsbad, California	SAN DIEGO AVIATORS 20, Orange County Breakers 19 * MS: Dennis Novikov (Breakers) 5, James Blake (Aviators) 3 * WS: Nicole Gibbs (Breakers) 5, Shelby Rogers (Aviators) 2 * MD: James Blake/Raven Klaasen (Aviators) 5, Dennis Novikov/Scott Lipsky (Breakers) 2 * WD: Darija Jurak/Shelby Rogers (Aviators) 5, Nicole Gibbs/Alla Kudryavtseva (Breakers) 3 * XD: Raven Klaasen/Darija Jurak (Aviators) 5, Scott Lipsky/Alla Kudryavtseva (Breakers) 4	0–1
2	August 1	Breakers Stadium at the Newport Beach Tennis Club; Newport Beach, California	ORANGE COUNTY BREAKERS 22, San Diego Aviators 20 * XD: Scott Lipsky/Alla Kudryavtseva (Breakers) 5, Raven Klaasen/Darija Jurak (Aviators) 2 * WS: Nicole Gibbs (Breakers) 5, Shelby Rogers (Aviators) 4 * MD: Ryan Harrison/Raven Klaasen (Aviators) 5, Steve Johnson/Scott Lipsky (Breakers) 3 * WD: Darija Jurak/Shelby Rogers (Aviators) 5, Nicole Gibbs/Alla Kudryavtseva (Breakers) 4 * MS: Steve Johnson (Breakers) 5, Ryan Harrison (Aviators) 4	1–1
3	August 2	Omni La Costa Resort and Spa; Carlsbad, California	SAN DIEGO AVIATORS 23, Orange County Breakers 15 (extended play) * MS: Ryan Harrison (Aviators) 5, Dennis Novikov (Breakers) 2 * WS: Shelby Rogers (Aviators) 5, Nicole Gibbs (Breakers) 1 * MD: Ryan Harrison/Raven Klaasen (Aviators) 5, Scott Lipsky/Dennis Novikov (Breakers) 2 * WD: Nicole Gibbs/Alla Kudryavtseva (Breakers) 5, Darija Jurak/Shelby Rogers (Aviators) 3 * XD: Scott Lipsky/Alla Kudryavtseva (Breakers) 5, Raven Klaasen/Darija Jurak (Aviators) 4 * EP - XD: Raven Klaasen/Darija Jurak (Aviators) 1, Scott Lipsky/Alla Kudryavtseva (Breakers) 0	1–2
4	August 3	Breakers Stadium at the Newport Beach Tennis Club; Newport Beach, California	ORANGE COUNTY BREAKERS 21, San Diego Aviators 19 * MD: Scott Lipsky/Dennis Novikov (Breakers) 5, Ryan Harrison/Raven Klaasen (Aviators) 2 * WS: Shelby Rogers (Aviators) 5, Nicole Gibbs (Breakers) 4 * MS: Ryan Harrison (Aviators) 5, Dennis Novikov (Breakers) 3 * XD: Raven Klaasen/Darija Jurak (Aviators) 5, Scott Lipsky/Alla Kudryavtseva (Breakers) 4 * WD: Nicole Gibbs/Alla Kudryavtseva (Breakers) 5, Darija Jurak/Shelby Rogers (Aviators) 2	2–2
5	August 5	Breakers Stadium at the Newport Beach Tennis Club; Newport Beach, California	ORANGE COUNTY BREAKERS 25, Washington Kastles 10 * MD: Scott Lipsky/Dennis Novikov (Breakers) 5, Bjorn Fratangelo/Ken Skupski (Kastles) 2 * WS: Nicole Gibbs (Breakers) 5, Madison Brengle (Kastles) 2 * MS: Dennis Novikov (Breakers) 5, Bjorn Fratangelo (Kastles) 2 * XD: Alla Kudryavtseva/Scott Lipsky (Breakers) 5, Andreja Klepač/Ken Skupski (Kastles) 1 * WD: Nicole Gibbs/Alla Kudryavtseva (Breakers) 5, Andreja Klepač/Madison Brengle (Kastles) 3	3–2
6	August 6	Breakers Stadium at the Newport Beach Tennis Club; Newport Beach, California	ORANGE COUNTY BREAKERS 25, New York Empire 8 * MD: Scott Lipsky/Dennis Novikov (Breakers) 5, Daniel Nguyen/Neal Skupski (Empire) 3 * WS: Nicole Gibbs (Breakers) 5, Christina McHale (Empire) 1 * MS: Dennis Novikov (Breakers) 5, Daniel Nguyen (Empire) 2 * XD: Alla Kudryavtseva/Scott Lipsky (Breakers) 5, María Irigoyen/Neal Skupski (Empire) 1 * WD: Nicole Gibbs/Alla Kudryavtseva (Breakers) 5, María Irigoyen/Christina McHale (Empire) 1	4–2
7	August 7	Breakers Stadium at the Newport Beach Tennis Club; Newport Beach, California	ORANGE COUNTY BREAKERS 23, Philadelphia Freedoms 17 * MD: Lukáš Lacko/Fabrice Martin (Freedoms) 5, Scott Lipsky/Dennis Novikov (Breakers) 4 * WS: Nicole Gibbs (Breakers) 5, Naomi Broady (Freedoms) 3 * MS: Dennis Novikov (Breakers) 5, Lukáš Lacko (Freedoms) 2 * XD: Naomi Broady/Fabrice Martin (Freedoms) 5, Alla Kudryavtseva/Scott Lipsky (Breakers) 4 * WD: Nicole Gibbs/Alla Kudryavtseva (Breakers) 5, Naomi Broady/Samantha Crawford (Freedoms) 2	5–2
8	August 9	Breakers Stadium at the Newport Beach Tennis Club; Newport Beach, California	ORANGE COUNTY BREAKERS 24, Springfield Lasers 17 * MD: Scott Lipsky/Dennis Novikov (Breakers) 5, Benjamin Becker/Jean Andersen (Lasers) 2 * WS: Nicole Gibbs (Breakers) 5, Pauline Parmentier (Lasers) 2 * MS: Benjamin Becker (Lasers) 5, Dennis Novikov (Breakers) 4 * XD: Scott Lipsky/Alla Kudryavtseva (Breakers) 5, Jean Andersen/Michaëlla Krajicek (Lasers) 4 * WD: Nicole Gibbs/Alla Kudryavtseva (Breakers) 5, Michaëlla Krajicek/Pauline Parmentier (Lasers) 4	6–2
9	August 10	Mediacom Stadium at Cooper Tennis Complex; Springfield, Missouri	Orange County Breakers 22, SPRINGFIELD LASERS 19 (extended play) * MD: Benjamin Becker/Eric Butorac (Lasers) 5, Scott Lipsky/Dennis Novikov (Breakers) 4 * WD: Nicole Gibbs/Alla Kudryavtseva (Breakers) 5, Michaëlla Krajicek/Pauline Parmentier (Lasers) 1 * XD: Eric Butorac/Michaëlla Krajicek (Lasers) 5, Scott Lipsky/Alla Kudryavtseva (Breakers) 3 * WS: Nicole Gibbs (Breakers) 5, Michaëlla Krajicek (Lasers) 3 * MS: Benjamin Becker (Lasers) 5, Dennis Novikov (Breakers) 4 * EP - MS: Dennis Novikov (Breakers) 1, Benjamin Becker (Lasers) 0	7–2
10	August 11	Forest Hills Stadium; New York City, New York	Orange County Breakers 19, NEW YORK EMPIRE 17 * XD: Alla Kudryavtseva/Scott Lipsky (Breakers) 5, Christina McHale/Neal Skupski (Empire) 3 * WD: María Irigoyen/Christina McHale (Empire) 5, Nicole Gibbs/Alla Kudryavtseva (Breakers) 2 * MS: Marcus Willis (Empire) 5, Dennis Novikov (Breakers) 2 * WS: Nicole Gibbs (Breakers) 5, María Irigoyen (Empire) 0 *** María Irigoyen substituted for Christina McHale at 0–3 * MD: Scott Lipsky/Dennis Novikov (Breakers) 5, Neal Skupski/Marcus Willis (Empire) 4	8–2
11	August 12	The Pavilion; Radnor Township, Pennsylvania	PHILADELPHIA FREEDOMS 21, Orange County Breakers 18 * MD: Fabrice Martin/Donald Young (Freedoms) 5, Scott Lipsky/Dennis Novikov (Breakers) 2 * WD: Nicole Gibbs/Alla Kudryavtseva (Breakers) 5, Naomi Broady/Coco Vandeweghe (Freedoms) 3 * XD: Naomi Broady/Fabrice Martin (Freedoms) 5, Alla Kudryavtseva/Scott Lipsky (Breakers) 4 * WS: Nicole Gibbs (Breakers) 5, Coco Vandeweghe (Freedoms) 3 * MS: Donald Young (Freedoms) 5, Dennis Novikov (Breakers) 2	8–3
12	August 13	Kastles Stadium at the Charles E. Smith Center; Washington, District of Columbia	WASHINGTON KASTLES 25, Orange County Breakers 19 (extended play) * XD: Nick Kyrgios/Andreja Klepač (Kastles) 5, Scott Lipsky/Alla Kudryavtseva (Breakers) 3 * WS: Madison Brengle (Kastles) 5, Nicole Gibbs (Breakers) 3 * MD: Sam Groth/Nick Kyrgios (Kastles) 5, Scott Lipsky/Dennis Novikov (Breakers) 4 * WD: Madison Brengle/Andreja Klepač (Kastles) 5, Nicole Gibbs/Alla Kudryavtseva (Breakers) 3 * MS: Dennis Novikov (Breakers) 5, Nick Kyrgios (Kastles) 4 * EP - MS: Nick Kyrgios (Kastles) 1, Dennis Novikov (Breakers) 1	8–4

=== WTT Finals ===
Legend
Breakers Win	Breakers Loss
Home team in CAPS

Date	Venue and location	Result and details
August 26	Forest Hills Stadium; New York City, New York	SAN DIEGO AVIATORS 25, Orange County Breakers 14 (extended play) * XD: Darija Jurak/Raven Klaasen (Aviators) 5, Alla Kudryavtseva/Scott Lipsky (Breakers) 2 * WS: Shelby Rogers (Aviators) 5, Nicole Gibbs (Breakers) 2 * MD: Ryan Harrison/Raven Klaasen (Aviators) 5, Scott Lipsky/Dennis Novikov (Breakers) 2 * WD: Darija Jurak/Shelby Rogers (Aviators) 5, Nicole Gibbs/Alla Kudryavtseva (Breakers) 2 * MS: Dennis Novikov (Breakers) 5, Ryan Harrison (Aviators) 4 * EP - MS: Ryan Harrison (Aviators) 1, Dennis Novikov (Breakers) 1

== Team personnel ==
=== On-court personnel ===
- (United States) Rick Leach – Head Coach
- (United States) Nicole Gibbs
- (United States) Steve Johnson
- (Russia) Alla Kudryavtseva
- (United States) Scott Lipsky
- (United States) Dennis Novikov

=== Front office ===
- Lorne Abony – Owner
- Allen Hardison – General Manager

== Statistics ==
Players are listed in order of their game-winning percentage provided they played in at least 40% of the Breakers' games in that event, which is the WTT minimum for qualification for league leaders in individual statistical categories.

Men's singles - regular season

Player	GP	GW	GL	PCT	A	DF	BPW	BPP	BP%	3APW	3APP	3AP%
Dennis Novikov	88	44	44	.500	30	8	6	27	.222	13	22	.591
Steve Johnson	9	5	4	.556	4	1	1	1	1.000	0	0	–
Total	97	49	48	.505	34	9	7	28	.250	13	22	.591

Women's singles - regular season

Player	GP	GW	GL	PCT	A	DF	BPW	BPP	BP%	3APW	3APP	3AP%
Nicole Gibbs	88	53	35	.602	16	13	18	35	.514	12	20	.600
Total	88	53	35	.602	16	13	18	35	.514	12	20	.600

Men's doubles - regular season

Player	GP	GW	GL	PCT	A	DF	BPW	BPP	BP%	3APW	3APP	3AP%
Dennis Novikov	86	43	43	.500	7	6	6	12	.500	11	14	.786
Scott Lipsky	94	46	48	.489	14	4	6	12	.500	11	15	.733
Steve Johnson	8	3	5	.375	1	0	0	0	–	0	1	.000
Total	94	46	48	.489	22	10	6	12	.500	11	15	.733

Women's doubles - regular season

Player	GP	GW	GL	PCT	A	DF	BPW	BPP	BP%	3APW	3APP	3AP%
Nicole Gibbs	91	52	39	.571	1	4	19	37	.514	9	23	.391
Alla Kudryavtseva	91	52	39	.571	6	7	19	37	.514	9	23	.391
Total	91	52	39	.571	7	11	19	37	.514	9	23	.391

Mixed doubles - regular season

Player	GP	GW	GL	PCT	A	DF	BPW	BPP	BP%	3APW	3APP	3AP%
Alla Kudryavtseva	98	52	46	.531	4	5	14	30	.467	10	18	.556
Scott Lipsky	98	52	46	.531	9	8	14	30	.467	10	18	.556
Total	98	52	46	.531	13	13	14	30	.467	10	18	.556

Team totals - regular season

Event	GP	GW	GL	PCT	A	DF	BPW	BPP	BP%	3APW	3APP	3AP%
Men's singles	97	49	48	.505	34	9	7	28	.250	13	22	.591
Women's singles	88	53	35	.602	16	13	18	35	.514	12	20	.600
Men's doubles	94	46	48	.489	22	10	6	12	.500	11	15	.733
Women's doubles	91	52	39	.571	7	11	19	37	.514	9	23	.391
Mixed doubles	98	52	46	.531	13	13	14	30	.467	10	18	.556
Total	468	252	216	.538	92	56	64	142	.451	55	98	.561

Men's singles - WTT Finals

Player	GP	GW	GL	PCT	A	DF	BPW	BPP	BP%	3APW	3APP	3AP%
Dennis Novikov	11	6	5	.545	5	3	0	1	.000	0	1	.000
Total	11	6	5	.545	5	3	0	1	.000	0	1	.000

Women's singles - WTT Finals

Player	GP	GW	GL	PCT	A	DF	BPW	BPP	BP%	3APW	3APP	3AP%
Nicole Gibbs	7	2	5	.286	0	3	0	2	.000	0	2	.000
Total	7	2	5	.286	0	3	0	2	.000	0	2	.000

Men's doubles - WTT Finals

Player	GP	GW	GL	PCT	A	DF	BPW	BPP	BP%	3APW	3APP	3AP%
Scott Lipsky	7	2	5	.286	0	0	0	3	.000	0	1	.000
Dennis Novikov	7	2	5	.286	1	1	0	3	.000	0	1	.000
Total	7	2	5	.286	1	1	0	3	.000	0	1	.000

Women's doubles - WTT Finals

Player	GP	GW	GL	PCT	A	DF	BPW	BPP	BP%	3APW	3APP	3AP%
Nicole Gibbs	7	2	5	.286	0	0	0	0	–	0	1	.000
Alla Kudryavtseva	7	2	5	.286	1	1	0	0	–	0	1	.000
Total	7	2	5	.286	1	1	0	0	–	0	1	.000

Mixed doubles - WTT Finals

Player	GP	GW	GL	PCT	A	DF	BPW	BPP	BP%	3APW	3APP	3AP%
Alla Kudryavtseva	7	2	5	.286	0	0	0	0	–	0	0	–
Scott Lipsky	7	2	5	.286	1	1	0	0	–	0	0	–
Total	7	2	5	.286	1	1	0	0	–	0	0	–

Team totals - WTT Finals

Event	GP	GW	GL	PCT	A	DF	BPW	BPP	BP%	3APW	3APP	3AP%
Men's singles	11	6	5	.545	5	3	0	1	.000	0	1	.000
Women's singles	7	2	5	.286	0	3	0	2	.000	0	2	.000
Men's doubles	7	2	5	.286	1	1	0	3	.000	0	1	.000
Women's doubles	7	2	5	.286	1	1	0	0	–	0	1	.000
Mixed doubles	7	2	5	.286	1	1	0	0	–	0	0	–
Total	39	14	25	.359	8	9	0	6	.000	0	5	.000

Men's singles - all matches

Player	GP	GW	GL	PCT	A	DF	BPW	BPP	BP%	3APW	3APP	3AP%
Dennis Novikov	99	50	49	.505	35	11	6	28	.214	13	23	.565
Steve Johnson	9	5	4	.556	4	1	1	1	1.000	0	0	–
Total	108	55	53	.509	39	12	7	29	.241	13	23	.565

Women's singles - all matches

Player	GP	GW	GL	PCT	A	DF	BPW	BPP	BP%	3APW	3APP	3AP%
Nicole Gibbs	95	55	40	.579	16	16	18	37	.486	12	22	.545
Total	95	55	40	.579	16	16	18	37	.486	12	22	.545

Men's doubles - all matches

Player	GP	GW	GL	PCT	A	DF	BPW	BPP	BP%	3APW	3APP	3AP%
Dennis Novikov	93	45	48	.483	8	7	6	15	.400	11	15	.733
Scott Lipsky	101	48	53	.475	14	4	6	15	.400	11	16	.688
Steve Johnson	8	3	5	.375	1	0	0	0	–	0	1	.000
Total	101	48	53	.475	23	11	6	15	.400	11	16	.688

Women's doubles - all matches

Player	GP	GW	GL	PCT	A	DF	BPW	BPP	BP%	3APW	3APP	3AP%
Nicole Gibbs	98	54	44	.551	1	4	19	37	.514	9	24	.375
Alla Kudryavtseva	98	54	44	.551	7	8	19	37	.514	9	24	.375
Total	98	54	44	.551	8	12	19	37	.514	9	24	.375

Mixed doubles - all matches

Player	GP	GW	GL	PCT	A	DF	BPW	BPP	BP%	3APW	3APP	3AP%
Alla Kudryavtseva	105	54	51	.514	4	5	14	30	.467	10	18	.556
Scott Lipsky	105	54	51	.514	10	9	14	30	.467	10	18	.556
Total	105	54	51	.514	14	14	14	30	.467	10	18	.556

Team totals - all matches

Event	GP	GW	GL	PCT	A	DF	BPW	BPP	BP%	3APW	3APP	3AP%
Men's singles	108	55	53	.509	39	12	7	29	.241	13	23	.565
Women's singles	95	55	40	.579	16	16	18	37	.486	12	22	.545
Men's doubles	101	48	53	.475	23	11	6	15	.400	11	16	.688
Women's doubles	98	54	44	.551	8	12	19	37	.514	9	24	.375
Mixed doubles	105	54	51	.514	14	14	14	30	.467	10	18	.556
Total	507	266	241	.525	100	65	64	148	.432	55	103	.534

== Transactions ==
- February 17, 2016: The Breakers traded Andy Roddick to the New York Empire for undisclosed consideration.
- March 25, 2016: The Breakers protected Nicole Gibbs and Alla Kudryavtseva and selected Scott Lipsky and Dennis Novikov at the WTT Draft. The Breakers left Jarmere Jenkins and Teymuraz Gabashvili unprotected.
- April 9, 2016: The Breakers did not protect Elina Svitolina as a wildcard player, effectively making her a free agent.
- April 29, 2016: The Breakers signed Steve Johnson as a wildcard player.

== Individual honors and achievements ==
Nicole Gibbs was named 2016 WTT Female Most Valuable Player. Gibbs was tied for first in the league with teammate Alla Kudryavtseva in winning percentage in women's doubles and was also second in women's singles.

Kudryavtseva and Scott Lipsky were tied for third in WTT in winning percentage in mixed doubles.

Dennis Novikov was third in WTT in winning percentage in men's singles and was also sixth in men's doubles.

== See also ==
- Sports in Los Angeles
