= 2016 Washington Kastles season =

- World TeamTennis: 3rd place

Record
- 2016 record: 7 wins, 5 losses
- Home record: 3 wins, 3 losses
- Road record: 4 wins, 2 losses
- Games won–lost: 241–228

Team info
- Owner(s): Mark Ein
- General manager: Kevin Wynne
- Coach: Murphy Jensen
- Captain: Leander Paes
- Stadium: Kastles Stadium at the Charles E. Smith Center (capacity: 3,212)

The 2016 season was the ninth season of the Washington Kastles in World TeamTennis (WTT). The Kastles finished third in WTT with seven wins and five losses and missed the postseason for the first time since 2010, ending their run of five consecutive WTT championships.

== Season recap ==
=== Draft ===
At the WTT Draft on March 25, 2016, the Kastles protected Martina Hingis in the marquee player portion of the draft. The Kastles also made a trade with the Orange County Breakers to acquire the fifth selection in the first round of the marquee player portion of the draft for undisclosed consideration. They used this pick to select Bob and Mike Bryan as a doubles team. In the second round of the marquee player portion of the draft, the Kastles chose Mardy Fish. All the Kastles' selections in the roster player portion of the draft were returning players from the 2015 team who were protected: Sam Querrey, team captain Leander Paes (2015 WTT Final Most Valuable Player), Madison Brengle and Anastasia Rodionova (2015 WTT Female Co-Most Valuable Player). In selecting Fish, the Kastles left Venus Williams unprotected. In protecting Querrey, the Kastles had to leave Denis Kudla unprotected.

=== Kastles sign Groth and Kyrgios ===
On June 15, 2016, the Kastles announced the signing of Sam Groth as a substitute player. Groth was scheduled to appear in the Kastles' matches on August 8, 10 and 13.

On July 22, 2016, the Kastles announced the signing of Nick Kyrgios as a wildcard player to appear in their August 13 match against the Orange County Breakers.

=== Querrey injured and Kudla returns ===
On July 29, 2016, the Kastles announced that Sam Querrey was injured and would miss the 2016 season. The Kastles re-signed Denis Kudla, a resident of nearby Arlington County, Virginia, as a substitute player. Kudla played for the Kastles in 2015, and won 51% of his games in singles and 67% of his games in men's doubles. Kudla was scheduled to play for the Kastles on July 31 and August 1, after which he would go to Rio de Janeiro to represent the United States at the 2016 Summer Olympics.

=== A solid start ===
The Kastles opened the season on the road as the opponent for the expansion New York Empire in its inaugural match on July 31, 2016. Captain Leander Paes and Denis Kudla, who arrived in New York City from Italy just hours before the match, got the Kastles started by taking a tiebreaker from Guido Pella and 2015 WTT Male Rookie of the Year Neal Skupski in men's doubles. Martina Hingis and Anastasia Rodionova followed with a 5–2 set win in women's doubles. Kudla was broken in the fourth game of the third set of men's singles and fell to fellow Olympian Pella, 5–2, to cut the Kastles lead to 12–11. Skupski and Christina McHale broke Paes's serve in the opening game of the fourth set of mixed doubles to tie the match at 12 all. However, Paes and Hingis broke back in the next game to get back on serve. A Hingis lob over McHale's head that landed on the far baseline secured another break for the Kastles in the sixth game, and they went on to take the set, 5–2, giving them a 17–13 lead heading to the final set. Madison Brengle closed out a 22–15 victory with a 5–2 set win over McHale in women's singles.

The following evening, Washington met the Springfield Lasers in the Kastles' home opener before a sellout crowd. Kudla was broken in the seventh game of the opening set of men's singles, and the Kastles found themselves behind, 5–3, early in the match. Brengle dominated the second set of women's singles, converting both of her break-point opportunities, and cruised to a 5–0 set win that gave the Kastles an 8–5 lead. Hingis and Bob Bryan took the court to open the third set of mixed doubles with Bryan holding serve. Coach Murphy Jensen then substituted Paes for Byran, reuniting the Hingis-Paes doubles team. They went on to take the set, 5–2, to increase the Kastles lead to 13–7. Hingis and Rodionova dropped a tiebreaker in the fourth set of women's doubles to cut the Kastles' lead to 17–12. The Bryan brothers held all their service games in the final set of men's doubles but could not convert any of their nine break-point opportunities. They won the set tiebreaker, 5–1, to secure a 22–16 victory for the Kastles.

The Kastles rematch with the Empire at home on August 2, 2016, did not go as expected. Mardy Fish opened the match by holding his service game in men's singles. After forcing a break point in the second game, he hobbled to the bench with a foot injury that ended his season. Paes was pressed into duty as a substitute for Fish. Although the 43-year-old Paes won a Bronze Medal in singles at the 1996 Summer Olympics, he had not appeared in a main draw in singles on the ATP Tour since 2005, and his last singles match came in an ITF tournament in 2008. Paes converted the break point Fish had created to give the Kastles a 2–0 lead. However, Pella managed to break back in the fifth game and eventually win the set tiebreaker, 5–2. Brengle continued her dominant play in women's singles by breaking McHale in both of her service games to take the set, 5–0, and give the Kastles a 9–5 lead. With Fish injured, the Kastles' 47-year-old coach Jensen took the court with Paes for the men's doubles set. Jensen, who won the men's doubles title at the 1993 French Open with his brother Luke, last appeared in an ATP Tour event in 2006. After the Empire broke Paes's serve in the fifth game, Jensen ran down a ball deep in the corner and returned it for a winner to earn a break point in the sixth game. His backhand return on the ensuing serve converted the break and got the Kastles back on serve. Pella and Skupski won the set tiebreaker, 5–3, to cut the Kastles' lead to 13–10. Hingis and Rodionova converted two breaks and held all three of their service games in women's doubles to increase the Kastles' lead to 18–11. Hingis and Paes closed out the match with a 5–3 set win in mixed doubles that gave the Kastles a 23–14 victory.

=== JP Smith replaces Fish and Rodionova goes to the Olympics ===
On August 3, 2016, the Kastles signed John-Patrick Smith as a substitute player to replace the injured Mardy Fish. The Kastles also lost Anastasia Rodionova, the 2015 WTT Female Co-Most Valuable Player, who was a late addition to the Australian Olympic team. They signed Andreja Klepač as a substitute player to replace Rodionova. Smith was scheduled to play only in the August 3 match, while Klepač was expected to remain with the team for the rest of the season. With the Kastles shorthanded, Leander Paes agreed to play in the August 3 match alongside Smith. Paes had a 10:05 pm flight that same evening to Rio de Janeiro to represent India at the Olympics. Paes went directly from Kastles Stadium to the airport after the match. The Kastles dropped four of the five sets and suffered a 23–18 home loss to the Philadelphia Freedoms.

On August 5, 2016, the Kastles signed Bjorn Fratangelo, Ken Skupski and Treat Huey as substitute players. Fratangelo and Skupski were scheduled to play for the team on August 5 and 6. Huey, who was born in Washington, D.C. and played for the Kastles in 2012, was scheduled to join the team on August 8, and play the remainder of the season.

=== Kastles lose four straight ===
On August 8, 2016, the Kastles announced they had signed Stéphane Robert as a substitute player to replace Sam Groth, who was called up to the Australian Olympic team. After Groth lost his first-round Olympic match to David Goffin, he returned to the Kastles for the remainder of the season.

After losing both matches on their West Coast road trip, including a 25–8 defeat at the hands of the Orange County Breakers, the worst loss in Kastles history, Washington carried a three-match losing streak into their home match with the New York Empire. Andreja Klepač and Treat Huey, who played together earlier in the year and reached the semifinals of the 2016 Australian Open, exchanged breaks of serve with María Irigoyen and Neal Skupski before falling in a set tiebreaker in the opening set of mixed doubles. Christina McHale got a measure of revenge against Madison Brengle, who had dominated her in their first two matchups earlier in the season, when she converted two breaks and denied Brengle on all three of her break-point opportunities to take the women's singles set, 5–1, and give the Empire a 10–5 lead. Huey and Robert won the men's doubles set in a tiebreaker to cut the Empire's lead to 14–10. The first three games of the women's doubles set featured two breaks by Brengle and Klepač and one by Irigoyen and McHale. Brengle settled things down by holding serve in the fourth game. She and Klepač secured another break in the seventh game to take the set, 5–2, and reduce the Kastles' deficit to 16–15. Robert and 2016 Wimbledon hero Marcus Willis each held all four of their service games in the final set of men's singles, and the Empire led, 20–19, going to the set tiebreaker. On match point, Willis hit a backhand into the net to knot the tiebreaker at 4 all. However, after a long rally on the set's deciding point, Willis hit a winner to give the Empire a 21–19 victory and cause the Kastles to suffer their first four-match losing streak since 2010.

The Kastles ended their losing streak the following evening in New York when they defeated the Empire, 22–13, in extended play. The Kastles were led by Brengle who blanked McHale, 5–0, in women's singles and teamed with Klepač for another 5–0 set win in women's doubles. Robert defended three break-point opportunities and managed to break Andy Roddick once for a 5–3 set win in men's singles. After dropping the fifth set of mixed doubles, Klepač and Huey won the first game of extended play to seal the victory.

=== Eliminated by winning ===
With a record of five wins and five losses, the Kastles were eliminated from postseason contention on August 21, 2016, when they won the third set of men's doubles in their match against the Springfield Lasers, 5–3. At the start of play, the Kastles could only qualify for the postseason in the case of a three-way tie with the Philadelphia Freedoms and the San Diego Aviators. In games won in matches against common opponents, the Aviators led with 149 with one common-opponent match to play, the Freedoms had 136 with one common-opponent match to play, and the Kastles had 118 with two common-opponent matches to play. Therefore, the maximum number of games the Kastles could win in matches against common opponents was 168 at the start of play. The Aviators won 19 games in the first four sets of their match against the New York Empire, which started one hour earlier than the Kastles' match in Springfield, to reach 168 games won against common opponents. The Kastles still could have won the next step of the three-way standings tiebreaker on fewest games lost in matches against common opponents. However, after dropping the first two sets of the match, the only way the Kastles could still reach 168 games won against common opponents was by losing the first four sets and then winning the match, 25–24, in a super tiebreaker. Therefore, in an odd set of circumstances, when the Kastles won the third set of their match, moments after the fourth set of the Aviators-Empire match was completed, the maximum number of games the Kastles could win against common opponents was reduced to 166, resulting in mathematical elimination and ending the Kastles' historic run of five consecutive WTT championships. It is the first time the Kastles have missed the postseason since 2010. The Kastles went on to win the match in which their run of championships came to an end, 21–20.

== Event chronology ==
- March 25, 2016: The Kastles protected Martina Hingis, Sam Querrey, Leander Paes, Madison Brengle and Anastasia Rodionova and drafted Bob and Mike Bryan and Mardy Fish at the WTT draft. The Kastles left Venus Williams and Denis Kudla unprotected.
- June 15, 2016: The Kastles signed Sam Groth as a substitute player.
- July 22, 2016: The Kastles signed Nick Kyrgios as a wildcard player.
- July 29, 2016: The Kastles re-signed Denis Kudla as a substitute player.
- August 3, 2016: The Kastles signed John-Patrick Smith and Andreja Klepač as substitute players.
- August 5, 2016: The Kastles signed Bjorn Fratangelo, Ken Skupski and Treat Huey as substitute players.
- August 8, 2016: The Kastles signed Stéphane Robert as a substitute player.
- August 12, 2016: The Kastles were eliminated from postseason contention when they won the third set of their match against the Springfield Lasers. It is the first time the Kastles missed the postseason since 2010, and ends their run of five consecutive WTT championships.

== Draft picks ==
As defending WTT champions, the Kastles selected last in each round of the draft. However, the Kastles also made a trade with the Orange County Breakers to acquire the fifth pick in the first round of the marquee player portion of the draft for undisclosed consideration. WTT conducted its 2016 draft during the Miami Open at the Tennis Center at Crandon Park in Key Biscayne, Florida on March 25. The selections made by the Kastles are shown in the table below.

Draft type	Round	No.	Overall	Player chosen	Prot?	Notes
Marquee	1	5	5	(United States) Bob and Mike Bryan	N	Doubles team
Marquee	1	6	6	(Switzerland) Martina Hingis	Y	
Marquee	2	6	12	(United States) Mardy Fish	N	
Roster	1	6	6	(United States) Sam Querrey	Y	Exempt
Roster	2	6	12	(India) Leander Paes	Y	Exempt
Roster	3	6	18	(United States) Madison Brengle	Y	
Roster	4	6	24	(Australia) Anastasia Rodionova	Y	

== Match log ==
Legend
Kastles Win	Kastles Loss
Home team in CAPS

Match	Date	Venue and location	Result and details	Record
1	July 31	Forest Hills Stadium; New York City, New York	Washington Kastles 22, NEW YORK EMPIRE 15 * MD: Denis Kudla/Leander Paes (Kastles) 5, Guido Pella/Neal Skupski (Empire) 4 * WD: Anastasia Rodionova/Martina Hingis (Kastles) 5, Christina McHale/María Irigoyen (Empire) 2 * MS: Guido Pella (Empire) 5, Denis Kudla (Kastles) 2 * XD: Martina Hingis/Leander Paes (Kastles) 5, Christina McHale/Neal Skupski (Empire) 2 * WS: Madison Brengle (Kastles) 5, Christina McHale (Empire) 2	1–0
2	August 1	Kastles Stadium at the Charles E. Smith Center; Washington, District of Columbia	WASHINGTON KASTLES 22, Springfield Lasers 16 * MS: Benjamin Becker (Lasers) 5, Denis Kudla (Kastles) 3 * WS: Madison Brengle (Kastles) 5, Pauline Parmentier (Lasers) 0 * XD: Leander Paes/Martina Hingis (Kastles) 5, Jean Andersen/Michaëlla Krajicek (Lasers) 2 *** Leander Paes substituted for Bob Bryan at 1–0 * WD: Michaëlla Krajicek/Pauline Parmentier (Lasers) 5, Martina Hingis/Anastasia Rodionova (Kastles) 4 * MD: Bob Bryan/Mike Bryan (Kastles) 5, Jean Andersen/Benjamin Becker (Lasers) 4	2–0
3	August 2	Kastles Stadium at the Charles E. Smith Center; Washington, District of Columbia	WASHINGTON KASTLES 23, New York Empire 14 * MS: Guido Pella (Empire) 5, Leander Paes (Kastles) 4 *** Leander Paes substituted for Mardy Fish at 1–0 * WS: Madison Brengle (Kastles) 5, Christina McHale (Empire) 0 * MD: Guido Pella/Neal Skupski (Empire) 5, Murphy Jensen/Leander Paes (Kastles) 4 * WD: Martina Hingis/Anastasia Rodionova (Kastles) 5, María Irigoyen/Christina McHale (Empire) 1 * XD: Martina Hingis/Leander Paes (Kastles) 5, María Irigoyen/Neal Skupski (Empire) 3	3–0
4	August 3	Kastles Stadium at the Charles E. Smith Center; Washington, District of Columbia	Philadelphia Freedoms 23, WASHINGTON KASTLES 18 * MD: Lukáš Lacko/Fabrice Martin (Freedoms) 5, Leander Paes/John-Patrick Smith (Kastles) 3 * XD: Naomi Broady/Fabrice Martin (Freedoms) 5, Andreja Klepač/Leander Paes (Kastles) 4 * MS: Lukáš Lacko (Freedoms) 5, John-Patrick Smith (Kastles) 3 * WD: Madison Brengle/Andreja Klepač (Kastles) 5, Naomi Broady/Samantha Crawford (Freedoms) 3 * WS: Naomi Broady (Freedoms) 5, Madison Brengle (Kastles) 3	3–1
5	August 5	Breakers Stadium at the Newport Beach Tennis Club; Newport Beach, California	ORANGE COUNTY BREAKERS 25, Washington Kastles 10 * MD: Scott Lipsky/Dennis Novikov (Breakers) 5, Bjorn Fratangelo/Ken Skupski (Kastles) 2 * WS: Nicole Gibbs (Breakers) 5, Madison Brengle (Kastles) 2 * MS: Dennis Novikov (Breakers) 5, Bjorn Fratangelo (Kastles) 2 * XD: Alla Kudryavtseva/Scott Lipsky (Breakers) 5, Andreja Klepač/Ken Skupski (Kastles) 1 * WD: Nicole Gibbs/Alla Kudryavtseva (Breakers) 5, Andreja Klepač/Madison Brengle (Kastles) 3	3–2
6	August 6	Omni La Costa Resort and Spa; Carlsbad, California	SAN DIEGO AVIATORS 21, Washington Kastles 15 * MS: Ernests Gulbis (Aviators) 5, Bjorn Fratangelo (Kastles) 2 * WS: Madison Brengle (Kastles) 5, Shelby Rogers (Aviators) 1 * MD: Ernests Gulbis/Raven Klaasen (Aviators) 5, Ken Skupski/Bjorn Fratangelo (Kastles) 2 * WD: Darija Jurak/Shelby Rogers (Aviators) 5, Madison Brengle/Andreja Klepač (Kastles) 3 * XD: Darija Jurak/Raven Klaasen (Aviators) 5, Andreja Klepač/Ken Skupski (Kastles) 3	3–3
7	August 8	Kastles Stadium at the Charles E. Smith Center; Washington, District of Columbia	New York Empire 21, WASHINGTON KASTLES 19 * XD: Neal Skupski/María Irigoyen (Empire) 5, Treat Huey/Andreja Klepač (Kastles) 4 * WS: Christina McHale (Empire) 5, Madison Brengle (Kastles) 1 * MD: Treat Huey/Stéphane Robert (Kastles) 5, Neal Skupski/Marcus Willis (Empire) 4 * WD: Madison Brengle/Andreja Klepač (Kastles) 5, Christina McHale/María Irigoyen (Empire) 2 * MS: Marcus Willis (Empire) 5, Stéphane Robert (Kastles) 4	3–4
8	August 9	Forest Hills Stadium; New York City, New York	Washington Kastles 22, NEW YORK EMPIRE 13 (extended play) * MD: Andy Roddick/Neal Skupski (Empire) 5, Treat Huey/Stéphane Robert (Kastles) 4 * WS: Madison Brengle (Kastles) 5, Christina McHale (Empire) 0 * MS: Stéphane Robert (Kastles) 5, Andy Roddick (Empire) 3 * WD: Madison Brengle/Andreja Klepač (Kastles) 5, María Irigoyen/Christina McHale (Empire) 0 * XD: María Irigoyen/Neal Skupski (Empire) 5, Andreja Klepač/Treat Huey (Kastles) 2 * EP - XD: Andreja Klepač/Treat Huey (Kastles) 1, María Irigoyen/Neal Skupski (Empire) 0	4–4
9	August 10	Kastles Stadium at the Charles E. Smith Center; Washington, District of Columbia	San Diego Aviators 23, WASHINGTON KASTLES 20 * XD: Treat Huey/Andreja Klepač (Kastles) 5, Raven Klaasen/Darija Jurak (Aviators) 4 * WS: Shelby Rogers (Aviators) 5, Madison Brengle (Kastles) 3 * MD: Sam Groth/Treat Huey (Kastles) 5, Ryan Harrison/Raven Klaasen (Aviators) 4 * WD: Shelby Rogers/Darija Jurak (Aviators) 5, Madison Brengle/Andreja Klepač (Kastles) 4 * MS: Ryan Harrison (Aviators) 5, Stéphane Robert (Kastles) 3	4–5
10	August 11	The Pavilion; Radnor Township, Pennsylvania	Washington Kastles 24, PHILADELPHIA FREEDOMS 18 * MD: Sam Groth/Treat Huey (Kastles) 5, Fabrice Martin/Donald Young (Freedoms) 4 * WS: Madison Brengle (Kastles) 5, Naomi Broady (Freedoms) 2 * MS: Sam Groth (Kastles) 5, Donald Young (Freedoms) 3 * WD: Naomi Broady/Samantha Crawford (Freedoms) 5, Madison Brengle/Andreja Klepač (Kastles) 4 * XD: Treat Huey/Andreja Klepač (Kastles) 5, Fabrice Martin/Naomi Broady (Freedoms) 4	5–5
11	August 12	Mediacom Stadium at Cooper Tennis Complex; Springfield, Missouri	Washington Kastles 21, SPRINGFIELD LASERS 20 * MS: Benjamin Becker (Lasers) 5, Sam Groth (Kastles) 3 * WD: Michaëlla Krajicek/Pauline Parmentier (Lasers) 5, Madison Brengle/Andreja Klepač (Kastles) 3 * MD: Sam Groth/Treat Huey (Kastles) 5, Benjamin Becker/Eric Butorac (Lasers) 3 * WS: Madison Brengle (Kastles) 5, Michaëlla Krajicek (Lasers) 3 * XD: Treat Huey/Andreja Klepač (Kastles) 5, Eric Butorac/Michaëlla Krajicek (Lasers) 4 *** Treat Huey substituted for Sam Groth at 3–3	6–5
12	August 13	Kastles Stadium at the Charles E. Smith Center; Washington, District of Columbia	WASHINGTON KASTLES 25, Orange County Breakers 19 (extended play) * XD: Nick Kyrgios/Andreja Klepač (Kastles) 5, Scott Lipsky/Alla Kudryavtseva (Breakers) 3 * WS: Madison Brengle (Kastles) 5, Nicole Gibbs (Breakers) 3 * MD: Sam Groth/Nick Kyrgios (Kastles) 5, Scott Lipsky/Dennis Novikov (Breakers) 4 * WD: Madison Brengle/Andreja Klepač (Kastles) 5, Nicole Gibbs/Alla Kudryavtseva (Breakers) 3 * MS: Dennis Novikov (Breakers) 5, Nick Kyrgios (Kastles) 4 * EP - MS: Nick Kyrgios (Kastles) 1, Dennis Novikov (Breakers) 1	7–5

== Team personnel ==
=== On-court personnel ===
- (United States) Murphy Jensen, Player-Coach
- (United States) Madison Brengle
- (United States) Bob Bryan
- (United States) Mike Bryan
- (United States) Mardy Fish
- (United States) Bjorn Fratangelo (Note: Player appeared in fewer than three matches during the season as a substitute player and was not eligible to be protected in the following year's draft.)
- (Australia) Sam Groth
- (Switzerland) Martina Hingis
- (Philippines) Treat Huey
- (Slovenia) Andreja Klepač
- (United States) Denis Kudla
- (Australia) Nick Kyrgios
- (India) Leander Paes
- (United States) Sam Querrey (Note: Injured, did not play, but may be protected in the 2017 WTT Draft pursuant to WTT Rule 308F, since the player was eligible for protection in 2016, and was injured before the 2016 season and unable to play.)
- (France) Stéphane Robert
- (Australia) Anastasia Rodionova
- (United Kingdom) Ken Skupski
- (Australia) John-Patrick Smith

=== Front office ===
- Mark Ein, Owner
- Kevin Wynne, General Manager

== Statistics ==
Players are listed in order of their game-winning percentage provided they played in at least 40% of the Kastles' games in that event, which is the WTT minimum for qualification for league leaders in individual statistical categories.

Men's singles

Player	GP	GW	GL	PCT	A	DF	BPW	BPP	BP%	3APW	3APP	3AP%
Mardy Fish	1	1	0	1.000	1	0	0	0	–	0	0	–
Sam Groth	16	8	8	.500	8	5	1	2	.500	1	3	.333
Stéphane Robert	25	12	13	.480	7	5	1	3	.333	2	3	.667
Nick Kyrgios	11	5	6	.455	9	2	0	8	.000	0	4	.000
Leander Paes	8	3	5	.375	0	2	1	2	.500	2	4	.500
John-Patrick Smith	8	3	5	.375	2	1	0	0	–	0	0	–
Denis Kudla	15	5	10	.333	3	1	0	2	.000	1	2	.500
Bjorn Fratangelo	14	4	10	.286	1	0	0	1	.000	0	3	.000
Total	98	41	57	.418	31	16	3	18	.167	6	19	.316

Women's singles

Player	GP	GW	GL	PCT	A	DF	BPW	BPP	BP%	3APW	3APP	3AP%
Madison Brengle	80	49	31	.613	3	4	18	35	.514	18	30	.600
Total	80	49	31	.613	3	4	18	35	.514	18	30	.600

Men's doubles

Player	GP	GW	GL	PCT	A	DF	BPW	BPP	BP%	3APW	3APP	3AP%
Treat Huey	44	24	20	.545	3	4	5	7	.714	4	8	.500
Sam Groth	35	20	15	.571	10	3	4	6	.667	2	7	.286
Bob Bryan	9	5	4	.556	0	0	0	9	.000	0	3	.000
Mike Bryan	9	5	4	.556	1	0	0	9	.000	0	3	.000
Denis Kudla	9	5	4	.556	1	0	0	1	.000	0	1	.000
Nick Kyrgios	9	5	4	.556	3	0	0	2	.000	0	2	.000
Stéphane Robert	18	9	9	.500	1	1	1	3	.333	2	3	.667
Leander Paes	26	12	14	.462	3	3	2	4	.500	2	4	.500
Murphy Jensen	9	4	5	.444	1	0	1	1	1.000	1	1	1.000
John-Patrick Smith	8	3	5	.375	2	1	1	2	.500	1	2	.500
Bjorn Fratangelo	14	4	10	.286	1	0	1	1	1.000	2	3	.667
Ken Skupski	14	4	10	.286	0	1	1	1	1.000	2	3	.667
Total	102	50	52	.490	26	13	8	23	.348	8	20	.400

Women's doubles

Player	GP	GW	GL	PCT	A	DF	BPW	BPP	BP%	3APW	3APP	3AP%
Madison Brengle	70	37	33	.529	0	1	13	33	.394	13	23	.565
Andreja Klepač	70	37	33	.529	0	1	13	33	.394	13	23	.565
Martina Hingis	22	14	8	.636	1	1	5	16	.313	3	7	.429
Anastasia Rodionova	22	14	8	.636	1	3	5	16	.313	3	7	.429
Total	92	51	41	.554	2	6	18	49	.367	16	30	.533

Mixed doubles

Player	GP	GW	GL	PCT	A	DF	BPW	BPP	BP%	3APW	3APP	3AP%
Andreja Klepač	75	35	40	.467	0	1	4	17	.235	5	12	.417
Bob Bryan	1	1	0	1.000	1	0	0	0	–	0	0	–
Martina Hingis	22	15	7	.682	0	2	5	13	.385	3	6	.500
Nick Kyrgios	8	5	3	.625	4	0	2	2	1.000	0	1	.000
Leander Paes	30	18	12	.600	1	1	5	15	.333	3	7	.429
Sam Groth	6	3	3	.500	2	0	0	0	–	0	0	–
Treat Huey	38	19	19	.500	8	5	2	13	.154	4	8	.500
Ken Skupski	14	4	10	.286	0	1	0	0	–	1	2	.500
Total	97	50	47	.515	16	10	9	30	.300	8	18	.444

Team totals

Event	GP	GW	GL	PCT	A	DF	BPW	BPP	BP%	3APW	3APP	3AP%
Men's singles	98	41	57	.418	31	16	3	18	.167	6	19	.316
Women's singles	80	49	31	.613	3	4	18	35	.514	18	30	.600
Men's doubles	102	50	52	.490	26	13	8	23	.348	8	20	.400
Women's doubles	92	51	41	.554	2	6	18	49	.367	16	30	.533
Mixed doubles	97	50	47	.515	16	10	9	30	.300	8	18	.444
Total	469	241	228	.514	78	49	56	155	.361	56	117	.479

== Individual achievements ==
Madison Brengle led WTT in winning percentage in women's singles and also tied for third with Andreja Klepač in women's doubles. Treat Huey was third in WTT in winning percentage in men's doubles.

== Transactions ==
- March 25, 2016: The Kastles protected Martina Hingis, Sam Querrey, Leander Paes, Madison Brengle and Anastasia Rodionova and drafted Bob and Mike Bryan and Mardy Fish at the WTT draft. The Kastles left Venus Williams and Denis Kudla unprotected.
- June 15, 2016: The Kastles signed Sam Groth as a substitute player.
- July 22, 2016: The Kastles signed Nick Kyrgios as a wildcard player.
- July 29, 2016: The Kastles re-signed Denis Kudla as a substitute player.
- August 3, 2016: The Kastles signed John-Patrick Smith and Andreja Klepač as substitute players.
- August 5, 2016: The Kastles signed Bjorn Fratangelo, Ken Skupski and Treat Huey as substitute players.
- August 8, 2016: The Kastles signed Stéphane Robert as a substitute player.

== See also ==
- Sports in Washington, D.C.
