= 2016 New York Empire season =

- World TeamTennis: 6th place

Record
- 2016 record: 2 wins, 10 losses
- Home record: 1 win, 5 losses
- Road record: 1 win, 5 losses
- Games won–lost: 195–254

Team info
- Owner(s): NY TeamTennis LLC represented by Michael Coakley
- General manager: Colleen Hopkins
- Coach: Patrick McEnroe
- Stadium: Forest Hills Stadium (capacity: 2,500)

The 2016 New York Empire season was the inaugural season of the franchise in World TeamTennis (WTT). The Empire finished last in WTT with 2 wins and 10 losses.

== Season recap ==
=== Founding of franchise ===
On February 17, 2016, WTT announced that the league would return to New York City for the 2016 season. The Empire announced it would play its home matches at historic Forest Hills Stadium. The 14,000-seat stadium was to be reconfigured to seat approximately 2,500 fans for Empire home matches. Concurrent with that announcement, the league also reported that the newly formed Empire had acquired the rights to former world number 1 male player Andy Roddick in a trade with the Orange County Breakers. Patrick McEnroe was named the team's head coach. McEnroe said when he received a call from WTT co-founder Billie Jean King and commissioner Ilana Kloss telling him the league was hoping to bring a team back to New York to play in Forest Hills, "That was a no-brainer for me. I'm excited to be back in the game." Speaking about Roddick, McEnroe added, "He and I have a great history. I think he still really loves to play. I'm super happy that he'll be part of the team." "As both a player and an owner I have always enjoyed all that encompasses Mylan WTT," said Roddick. "To be able to play on the legendary courts at Forest Hills and be involved with a team in a city that I love, New York, will make this even more special."

=== Draft ===
As an expansion team, the Empire had no returning players to protect in the 2016 WTT draft other than Andy Roddick, whom the team had acquired in a trade. Roddick was protected in the first round of the marquee player portion of the draft, and the Empire passed on making a second marquee selection. In the roster player portion of the draft, the Empire was interested in selecting Christina McHale, a resident of nearby Englewood Cliffs, New Jersey, and traded up to do so. The trade with the Springfield Lasers gave the Empire the first overall selection in the roster player portion of the draft along with the first pick in the fourth round in exchange for the third pick in each of the first and third rounds. As expected, McHale was taken with the first overall selection. She had previously played in WTT in 2011, with the Kansas City Explorers. The Empire used its next two picks to take a pair of Argentines: Guido Pella and María Irigoyen, neither of whom has played in WTT in the past. Their final choice was the Austrian Oliver Marach, also a WTT rookie. The Empire elected not to choose a roster-exempt player in the fifth round.

=== Skupski replaces Marach ===
On July 20, 2016, the Empire announced it had signed 2015 WTT Male Rookie of the Year Neal Skupski to replace Oliver Marach, who had been selected to represent Austria at the 2016 Summer Olympics.

=== Pella selected for Argentina's Olympic team ===
On July 29, 2016, the Empire announced that it had signed Noah Rubin and Daniel Nguyen as substitute players to replace Guido Pella, who was to play in the Empire's first three matches of the season before going to Rio de Janeiro to represent Argentina at the 2016 Summer Olympics. Rubin was scheduled to appear in the Empire's home match on August 3. Nguyen appeared in road matches on August 5 and 6. Rubin, who is from nearby Rockville Centre, New York, said, "I am truly excited to play in front of a home crowd. Being from New York, I grew up watching World TeamTennis and it will be great to compete in it." He added, "I was always around the old New York Sportimes team and really found it to be a blast. Being able to play against some pretty good competition in a fun atmosphere is something I really look forward to. It's a really fun thing for the players and for the fans. Very interactive."

=== Inaugural match ===
The Empire made its debut on July 31, 2016, with a home match against the five-time defending WTT champion Washington Kastles. The match opened with Guido Pella and Neal Skupski dropping a men's doubles tiebreaker. The Empire won only one set, when Pella took the men's singles, 5–2. The Kastles won the match, 22–15.

=== First win in franchise history ===
After opening the season with three straight losses, the Empire secured the first win in franchise history on August 4, 2016, when it defeated the Springfield Lasers, 19–15, at Forest Hills Stadium. Long Island native Noah Rubin teamed with Neal Skupski to take the opening set of men's doubles, 5–2. After dropping the second and third sets, the Empire found itself trailing, 12–9. In the fourth set, New Jersey native Christina McHale and María Irigoyen held all three of their service games while breaking Michaëlla Krajicek and Pauline Parmentier twice for a 5–1 women's doubles set win that gave the Empire a 14–13 lead heading to the final set. Irigoyen and Skupski held all four of their service games and managed a break to win the fifth set of mixed doubles, 5–2, and close out the victory.

=== Empire signs Willis and gets second win ===
On August 8, 2016, the Empire signed Marcus Willis as a substitute player. Just a few months earlier, Willis became the lowest ranked qualifier to reach the second round of a Grand Slam tournament since 1988, when he defeated Ričardas Berankis at the 2016 Wimbledon Championships.

Willis made his Empire debut that same evening in a road match against the five-time defending WTT champion Washington Kastles. After getting broken early and falling behind, 0–3, in the set, María Irigoyen and Neal Skupski broke back and got the Empire off to a good start when by winning the opening set of mixed doubles in a tiebreaker. Christina McHale broke Madison Brengle's serve twice for a 5–1 women's singles set win that gave the Empire a 10–5 lead. Willis and Skupski dropped the third set of men's doubles in a tiebreaker, and Irigoyen and McHale lost the fourth set of women's doubles to shrink the Empire's lead to 16–15 heading to the final set. Willis and Stéphane Robert each served well and held all four of their service games to send the man's singles set to a tiebreaker with the Empire leading, 20–19. Willis avoided extended play by taking the tiebreaker to seal a 21–19 victory that improved the Empire's record to 2 wins and 5 losses.

=== Roddick makes his debut, and the Empire is eliminated ===
Following the Empire's road victory over the Washington Kastles the previous evening, Andy Roddick made his Empire debut in a rematch with the Kastles at home on August 9, 2016. Roddick and Neal Skupski opened the match by taking the men's doubles set in a tiebreaker after both teams held all their service games. Madison Brengle's 5–0 set win over Christina McHale put the Kastles in front, 9–5. In men's singles, Roddick dropped one of his service games and could not convert any of his three break point opportunities against Stéphane Robert, which gave the Kastles the set, 5–3, and a 14–8 lead in the match. Brengle and Andreja Klepač followed with a 5–0 women's doubles set win over McHale and María Irigoyen that extended the Washington lead to 19–8. Irigoyen and Skupski took the mixed doubles set, 5–2, to send the match to extended play with the Kastles leading, 21–13. Klepač and Treat Huey held serve in the opening game of extended play to give the Kastles a 22–13 victory and drop the Empire's record to 2 wins and 6 losses.

Roddick remained with the Empire the following evening for a road match against the Philadelphia Freedoms. The match opened with Roddick and Skupski facing Donald Young and Fabrice Martin. Both teams held three service games and broke once to send the set to a tiebreaker. Empire coach Patrick McEnroe substituted Marcus Willis for Skupski in the tiebreaker, but the Freedoms prevailed. After McHale took the first three games of the women's singles set from Naomi Broady, the Freedoms substituted Samantha Crawford for Broady. McHale broke Crawford in her service game and took the set, 5–0, to give the Empire a 9–5 lead. The Freedoms regained the lead at 10–9, when Martin and Broady took the mixed doubles set, 5–0, from Skupski and McHale, who had substituted for Irigoyen after the Empire fell behind, 0–3. McHale and Irigoyen won 21 of the 32 points played against Broady and Crawford in the women's doubles set for a 5–1 victory that gave the Empire a 14–11 lead. In the final set, Young held his four service games and broke Roddick once for a 5–2 men's singles set win that tied the match at 16 and sent it to a super tiebreaker. Young took the super tiebreaker, 7–3, to give the Freedoms a 17–16 victory and eliminate the Empire from postseason contention with a record of 2 wins and 7 losses.

=== Season finale ===
The Empire met the Springfield Lasers in the season finale for both teams in Springfield, Missouri on August 13, 2016. The loser of the match would finish last in WTT. The Empire fell behind early, losing the first three sets of men's, women's and mixed doubles to give the Lasers a 15–8 lead. Christina McHale won the fourth set of women's singles, 5–2, to cut the Lasers lead to 17–13 heading to the final set. Marcus Willis won the men's singles set in a tiebreaker to send the match to extended play with the Lasers leading 21–18. After Willis won the first game of extended play, Benjamin Becker won the second to secure a 22–19 victory for the Lasers that gave the Empire WTT's worst record in 2016.

== Event chronology ==
- February 17, 2016: WTT announced the founding of the New York Empire as an expansion franchise to begin play in the 2016 season at Forest Hills Stadium.
- February 17, 2016: The Empire acquired Andy Roddick in a trade with the Orange County Breakers for undisclosed consideration.
- March 25, 2016: The Empire protected Andy Roddick and drafted Christina McHale, Guido Pella, María Irigoyen and Oliver Marach at the WTT draft.
- July 20, 2016: The Empire signed Neal Skupski as a roster player to replace Oliver Marach.
- July 29, 2016: The Empire signed Noah Rubin and Daniel Nguyen as substitute players.
- August 8, 2016: The Empire signed Marcus Willis as a substitute player.
- August 10, 2016: The Empire was eliminated from postseason contention with a record of 2 wins and 7 losses, when it lost a road match against the Philadelphia Freedoms, 17–16, in a super tiebreaker (7–3).

== Draft picks ==
As an expansion team, the Empire was assigned the middle draft position closest to the first draft position, since there was an even number of teams in the league. WTT conducted its 2016 draft on March 25, in Key Biscayne, Florida. In the roster player portion of the draft, the Empire traded the third pick in the first round and the third pick in the third round to the Springfield Lasers in exchange for the first pick in the first round and the first pick in the fourth round. The selections made by the Empire are shown in the table below.

Draft type	Round	No.	Overall	Player chosen	Prot?
Marquee	1	3	3	(United States) Andy Roddick	Y
Marquee	2	3	9	Pass	–
Roster	1	1	1	(United States) Christina McHale	N
Roster	2	3	9	(Argentina) Guido Pella	N
Roster	4	1	19	(Argentina) María Irigoyen	N
Roster	4	3	21	(Austria) Oliver Marach	N
Roster	5	3	27	Pass	–

== Match log ==
Legend
Empire Win	Empire Loss
Home team in CAPS

Match	Date	Venue and location	Result and details	Record
1	July 31	Forest Hills Stadium; New York City, New York	Washington Kastles 22, NEW YORK EMPIRE 15 * MD: Denis Kudla/Leander Paes (Kastles) 5, Guido Pella/Neal Skupski (Empire) 4 * WD: Anastasia Rodionova/Martina Hingis (Kastles) 5, Christina McHale/María Irigoyen (Empire) 2 * MS: Guido Pella (Empire) 5, Denis Kudla (Kastles) 2 * XD: Martina Hingis/Leander Paes (Kastles) 5, Christina McHale/Neal Skupski (Empire) 2 * WS: Madison Brengle (Kastles) 5, Christina McHale (Empire) 2	0–1
2	August 1	Forest Hills Stadium; New York City, New York	Philadelphia Freedoms 22, NEW YORK EMPIRE 19 (extended play) * MS: Guido Pella (Empire) 5, Lukáš Lacko (Freedoms) 2 * WD: Caroline Wozniacki/Naomi Broady (Freedoms) 5, Christina McHale/María Irigoyen (Empire) 4 * XD: Naomi Broady/Fabrice Martin (Freedoms) 5, María Irigoyen/Neal Skupski (Empire) 3 * WS: Caroline Wozniacki (Freedoms) 5, Christina McHale (Empire) 0 * MD: Guido Pella/Neal Skupski (Empire) 5, Lukáš Lacko/Fabrice Martin (Freedoms) 4 * EP - MD: Guido Pella/Neal Skupski (Empire) 2, Lukáš Lacko/Fabrice Martin (Freedoms) 1	0–2
3	August 2	Kastles Stadium at the Charles E. Smith Center; Washington, District of Columbia	WASHINGTON KASTLES 23, New York Empire 14 * MS: Guido Pella (Empire) 5, Leander Paes (Kastles) 4 *** Leander Paes substituted for Mardy Fish at 1–0 * WS: Madison Brengle (Kastles) 5, Christina McHale (Empire) 0 * MD: Guido Pella/Neal Skupski (Empire) 5, Murphy Jensen/Leander Paes (Kastles) 4 * WD: Martina Hingis/Anastasia Rodionova (Kastles) 5, María Irigoyen/Christina McHale (Empire) 1 * XD: Martina Hingis/Leander Paes (Kastles) 5, María Irigoyen/Neal Skupski (Empire) 3	0–3
4	August 3	Forest Hills Stadium; New York City, New York	NEW YORK EMPIRE 19, Springfield Lasers 15 * MD: Noah Rubin/Neal Skupski (Empire) 5, Benjamin Becker/Jean Andersen (Lasers) 2 * WS: Pauline Parmentier (Lasers) 5, Christina McHale (Empire) 0 * MS: Benjamin Becker (Lasers) 5, Noah Rubin (Empire) 4 * WD: Christina McHale/María Irigoyen (Empire) 5, Michaëlla Krajicek/Pauline Parmentier (Lasers) 1 * XD: María Irigoyen/Neal Skupski (Empire) 5, Michaëlla Krajicek/Jean Andersen (Lasers) 2	1–3
5	August 5	Omni La Costa Resort and Spa; Carlsbad, California	SAN DIEGO AVIATORS 24, New York Empire 18 * MS: Ryan Harrison (Aviators) 5, Daniel Nguyen (Empire) 4 * WS: Shelby Rogers (Aviators) 5, Christina McHale (Empire) 4 * MD: Raven Klaasen/Ryan Harrison (Aviators) 5, Daniel Nguyen/Neal Skupski (Empire) 2 * WD: María Irigoyen/Christina McHale (Empire) 5, Darija Jurak/Shelby Rogers (Aviators) 4 * XD: Darija Jurak/Raven Klaasen (Aviators) 5, María Irigoyen/Neal Skupski (Empire) 3	1–4
6	August 6	Breakers Stadium at the Newport Beach Tennis Club; Newport Beach, California	ORANGE COUNTY BREAKERS 25, New York Empire 8 * MD: Scott Lipsky/Dennis Novikov (Breakers) 5, Daniel Nguyen/Neal Skupski (Empire) 3 * WS: Nicole Gibbs (Breakers) 5, Christina McHale (Empire) 1 * MS: Dennis Novikov (Breakers) 5, Daniel Nguyen (Empire) 2 * XD: Alla Kudryavtseva/Scott Lipsky (Breakers) 5, María Irigoyen/Neal Skupski (Empire) 1 * WD: Nicole Gibbs/Alla Kudryavtseva (Breakers) 5, María Irigoyen/Christina McHale (Empire) 1	1–5
7	August 8	Kastles Stadium at the Charles E. Smith Center; Washington, District of Columbia	New York Empire 21, WASHINGTON KASTLES 19 * XD: Neal Skupski/María Irigoyen (Empire) 5, Treat Huey/Andreja Klepač (Kastles) 4 * WS: Christina McHale (Empire) 5, Madison Brengle (Kastles) 1 * MD: Treat Huey/Stéphane Robert (Kastles) 5, Neal Skupski/Marcus Willis (Empire) 4 * WD: Madison Brengle/Andreja Klepač (Kastles) 5, Christina McHale/María Irigoyen (Empire) 2 * MS: Marcus Willis (Empire) 5, Stéphane Robert (Kastles) 4	2–5
8	August 9	Forest Hills Stadium; New York City, New York	Washington Kastles 22, NEW YORK EMPIRE 13 (extended play) * MD: Andy Roddick/Neal Skupski (Empire) 5, Treat Huey/Stéphane Robert (Kastles) 4 * WS: Madison Brengle (Kastles) 5, Christina McHale (Empire) 0 * MS: Stéphane Robert (Kastles) 5, Andy Roddick (Empire) 3 * WD: Madison Brengle/Andreja Klepač (Kastles) 5, María Irigoyen/Christina McHale (Empire) 0 * XD: María Irigoyen/Neal Skupski (Empire) 5, Andreja Klepač/Treat Huey (Kastles) 2 * EP - XD: Andreja Klepač/Treat Huey (Kastles) 1, María Irigoyen/Neal Skupski (Empire) 0	2–6
9	August 10	The Pavilion; Radnor Township, Pennsylvania	PHILADELPHIA FREEDOMS 17, New York Empire 16 (super tiebreaker, 7–3) * MD: Fabrice Martin/Donald Young (Freedoms) 5, Andy Roddick/Marcus Willis (Empire) 4 *** Marcus Willis substituted for Neal Skupski at 4–4 * WS: Christina McHale (Empire) 5, Samantha Crawford (Freedoms) 0 *** Samantha Crawford substituted for Naomi Broady at 0–3 * XD: Naomi Broady/Fabrice Martin (Freedoms) 5, Christina McHale/Neal Skupski (Empire) 0 *** Christina McHale substituted for María Irigoyen at 0–3 * WD: María Irigoyen/Christina McHale (Empire) 5, Naomi Broady/Samantha Crawford (Freedoms) 1 * MS: Donald Young (Freedoms) 5, Andy Roddick (Empire) 2 * STB - MS: Donald Young (Freedoms) 7, Andy Roddick (Empire) 3	2–7
10	August 11	Forest Hills Stadium; New York City, New York	Orange County Breakers 19, NEW YORK EMPIRE 17 * XD: Alla Kudryavtseva/Scott Lipsky (Breakers) 5, Christina McHale/Neal Skupski (Empire) 3 * WD: María Irigoyen/Christina McHale (Empire) 5, Nicole Gibbs/Alla Kudryavtseva (Breakers) 2 * MS: Marcus Willis (Empire) 5, Dennis Novikov (Breakers) 2 * WS: Nicole Gibbs (Breakers) 5, María Irigoyen (Empire) 0 *** María Irigoyen substituted for Christina McHale at 0–3 * MD: Scott Lipsky/Dennis Novikov (Breakers) 5, Neal Skupski/Marcus Willis (Empire) 4	2–8
11	August 12	Forest Hills Stadium; New York City, New York	San Diego Aviators 24, NEW YORK EMPIRE 16 * MS: Ryan Harrison (Aviators) 5, Marcus Willis (Empire) 3 * WS: Christina McHale (Empire) 5, Shelby Rogers (Aviators) 4 * XD: Raven Klaasen/Darija Jurak (Aviators) 5, Neal Skupski/María Irigoyen (Empire) 3 * WD: Shelby Rogers/Darija Jurak (Aviators) 5, María Irigoyen/Christina McHale (Empire) 2 * MD: Ryan Harrison/Raven Klaasen (Aviators) 5, Neal Skupski/Marcus Willis (Empire) 3	2–9
12	August 13	Mediacom Stadium at Cooper Tennis Complex; Springfield, Missouri	SPRINGFIELD LASERS 22, New York Empire 19 (extended play) * MD: Benjamin Becker/Eric Butorac (Lasers) 5, Neal Skupski/Marcus Willis (Empire) 4 * WD: Michaëlla Krajicek/Pauline Parmentier (Lasers) 5, María Irigoyen/Christina McHale (Empire) 3 * XD: Michaëlla Krajicek/Eric Butorac (Lasers) 5, María Irigoyen/Neal Skupski (Empire) 1 * WS: Christina McHale (Empire) 5, Michaëlla Krajicek (Lasers) 2 * MS: Marcus Willis (Empire) 5, Benjamin Becker (Lasers) 4 * EP - MS: Benjamin Becker (Lasers) 1, Marcus Willis (Empire) 1	2–10

== Team personnel ==
=== On-court personnel ===
- (United States) Patrick McEnroe, Coach
- (Argentina) María Irigoyen
- (Austria) Oliver Marach (Note: Schedule conflict with Olympics, did not play.)
- (United States) Christina McHale
- (United States) Daniel Nguyen (Note: Player appeared in fewer than three matches during the season as a substitute player and was not eligible to be protected in the following year's draft.)
- (Argentina) Guido Pella
- (United States) Andy Roddick
- (United States) Noah Rubin
- (United Kingdom) Neal Skupski
- (United Kingdom) Marcus Willis

=== Front office ===
- Michael Coakley, representing NY TeamTennis LLC, Owner
- Colleen Hopkins, General Manager

== Statistics ==
Players are listed in order of their game-winning percentage provided they played in at least 40% of the Empire's games in that event, which is the WTT minimum for qualification for league leaders in individual statistical categories. (Note: There may be minor errors in some of the statistics shown in this section, since the numbers reported by WTT on its website cannot possibly be correct. For example, the sum of break points won by individual men's doubles players is an odd number. Where possible, posting errors have been identified and corrected based on the match statistical summaries.)

Men's singles

Player	GP	GW	GL	PCT	A	DF	BPW	BPP	BP%	3APW	3APP	3AP%
Guido Pella	23	15	8	.652	3	2	4	9	.444	3	7	.429
Marcus Willis	35	19	16	.543	14	3	1	9	.111	3	8	.375
Noah Rubin	9	4	5	.444	0	2	1	2	.500	2	2	1.000
Daniel Nguyen	16	6	10	.375	1	4	1	2	.500	1	4	.250
Andy Roddick	16	5	11	.313	6	0	0	6	.000	2	6	.333
Total	99	49	50	.495	24	11	7	28	.250	11	27	.407

Women's singles

Player	GP	GW	GL	PCT	A	DF	BPW	BPP	BP%	3APW	3APP	3AP%
Christina McHale	72	27	45	.375	7	9	9	16	.563	8	17	.471
María Irigoyen	2	0	2	.000	0	0	0	0	–	0	0	–
Total	74	27	47	.365	7	9	9	16	.563	8	17	.471

Men's doubles

Player	GP	GW	GL	PCT	A	DF	BPW	BPP	BP%	3APW	3APP	3AP%
Neal Skupski	104	50	54	.481	7	7	6	17	.353	10	19	.526
Noah Rubin	7	5	2	.714	0	0	1	2	.500	1	1	1.000
Guido Pella	30	16	14	.533	0	0	3	4	.750	4	6	.667
Andy Roddick	18	9	9	.500	4	0	1	2	.500	2	2	1.000
Marcus Willis (Note: Break-point and 3-all-point statistics adjusted for posting error on August 10 match summary.)	36	15	21	.417	10	5	1	5	.200	3	7	.500
Daniel Nguyen	15	5	10	.333	1	1	0	4	.000	0	3	.000
Total	105	50	55	.476	22	13	6	17	.353	10	19	.526

Women's doubles

Player	GP	GW	GL	PCT	A	DF	BPW	BPP	BP%	3APW	3APP	3AP%
María Irigoyen	83	35	48	.422	0	1	12	27	.444	9	22	.409
Christina McHale	83	35	48	.422	1	8	12	27	.444	9	22	.409
Total	83	35	48	.422	1	9	12	27	.444	9	22	.409

Mixed doubles

Player	GP	GW	GL	PCT	A	DF	BPW	BPP	BP%	3APW	3APP	3AP%
María Irigoyen	71	29	42	.408	0	3	5	20	.250	9	18	.500
Neal Skupski	88	34	54	.386	13	9	6	26	.231	10	24	.417
Christina McHale (Note: 3-all-point statistics adjusted for posting error on August 10 match summary.)	17	5	12	.294	0	1	1	6	.167	1	6	.167
Total	88	34	54	.386	13	13	6	26	.231	10	24	.417

Team totals

Event	GP	GW	GL	PCT	A	DF	BPW	BPP	BP%	3APW	3APP	3AP%
Men's singles	99	49	50	.495	24	11	7	28	.250	11	27	.407
Women's singles	74	27	47	.365	7	9	9	16	.563	8	17	.471
Men's doubles	105	50	55	.476	22	13	6	17	.353	10	19	.526
Women's doubles	83	35	48	.422	1	9	12	27	.444	9	22	.409
Mixed doubles	88	34	54	.386	13	13	6	26	.231	10	24	.417
Total	449	195	254	.434	67	55	40	114	.351	48	109	.440

== Transactions ==
- February 17, 2017: The Empire acquired Andy Roddick in a trade with the Orange County Breakers for undisclosed consideration.
- March 25, 2016: The Empire protected Andy Roddick and drafted Christina McHale, Guido Pella, María Irigoyen and Oliver Marach at the WTT draft.
- July 20, 2016: The Empire signed Neal Skupski as a roster player to replace Oliver Marach.
- July 29, 2016: The Empire signed Noah Rubin and Daniel Nguyen as substitute players.
- August 8, 2016: The Empire signed Marcus Willis as a substitute player.

== See also ==
- Sports in New York City
