= 2016 World TeamTennis season =

- League: World TeamTennis
- Sport: Team tennis
- Duration: July 31 – August 26, 2016
- Matches: Regular season: 36 (12 for each team); Postseason: 1
- Teams: 6
- TV partner(s): ESPN2; ESPN3; Tennis Channel; Altitude Sports and Entertainment; Comcast SportsNet affiliates Mediacom Connections; MSG

World TeamTennis Player Draft
- Top draft pick: (United States) John Isner
- Picked by: Springfield Lasers

Regular season
- Top seed: San Diego Aviators
- Season MVP: (United States) Ryan Harrison (Male MVP) (San Diego) (United States) Nicole Gibbs (Female MVP) (Orange County)

World TeamTennis Final
- Venue: Forest Hills Stadium
- Champions: San Diego Aviators
- Runners-up: Orange County Breakers
- Finals MVP: (South Africa) Raven Klaasen (San Diego)

World TeamTennis seasons
- ← 2015 2017 →

The 2016 World TeamTennis season was the 41st season of the top professional team tennis league in the United States. Pursuant to a sponsorship agreement with Mylan N.V., the official name of the league was Mylan World TeamTennis in 2016.

The San Diego Aviators defeated the Orange County Breakers, 25–14 in extended play, in the WTT Finals to win the King Trophy as WTT champions.

== Competition format ==
The 2016 World TeamTennis season included six teams. Unlike previous seasons, the teams were not split into two conferences. Each team played a 12-match regular-season schedule with six home and six away matches. The top two teams in the regular season qualified for the World TeamTennis Final at Forest Hills Stadium in New York City. The higher seed was treated as the "home" team in the WTT Final and had the right to determine order of play. The winner of the WTT Final was awarded the King Trophy.

== Franchise movement, contraction and expansion ==
On December 14, 2015, the Austin Aces announced that the team would move back to Orange County, California for the 2016 season and be renamed the Orange County Breakers. On January 27, 2016, the Breakers announced that they would play their home matches at Breakers Stadium at the Newport Beach Tennis Club.

In December 2015, Randy Peters Catering of Citrus Heights, California sued the California Dream and its three owners in Sacramento County Superior Court demanding US$19,249 for its unpaid bills as the team's food concessionaire. Also in December 2015, one of the Dream's minority owners, Bob Kaliski, told The Sacramento Bee that he had personally lost US$175,000 investing in the team and that majority owner Jeff Launius had told him the Dream owed its vendors US$192,000 at the end of the season. Kaliski said, "I don't know if the team is going to be back or not. I know I'm not going to be back. I don't know about the rest of the team." WTT said that the Dream had until the end of December to meet its financial commitments to the league in order to secure its spot for 2016. On January 13, 2016, WTT announced that the Dream franchise had been terminated due to noncompliance with the team's obligations to the league.

On February 17, 2016, WTT announced that the Boston Lobsters had folded. The team had been owned and operated by the league during the 2015 season after the retirement of its former owner Bahar Uttam, who walked away from it. WTT had been unable to find a new owner for the franchise. In a press release, WTT commissioner Ilana Kloss said, "We spent more than a year seeking a local owner or ownership group, but unfortunately we were not able to find the right fit." She went on to say that WTT was leaving the door open for a return to Boston if the right ownership could be found. Keith Callahan, general manager of the Manchester Athletic Club said that the club had been approached by WTT to take over ownership of the team but had turned it down. "We just made a decision not to do that," he said. "It would have taken an enormous amount of resources to take on an operation like that, and we made a decision to commit those resources to improving the business and to making improvements for our members to make the operation better for them and for the community." WTT's asking price for the Lobsters was US$1 million.

Concurrent with the announcement of the folding of the Lobsters, WTT announced an expansion team for New York City named the New York Empire that began play in 2016. The team played its home matches at Forest Hills Stadium in Forest Hills, Queens, New York City, New York.

== Draft ==
WTT conducted its 2016 draft on March 25, in Key Biscayne, Florida. The order in which teams selected was based on the results the teams achieved in 2015, with weaker teams selecting earlier and stronger teams selecting later. The draft order is ordinarily determined as follows:

1. Nonplayoff teams ranked from worst regular-season record to best
2. Conference championship loser with the worse record of the two
3. Conference championship loser with the better record of the two
4. WTT Final loser
5. WTT champion

Expansion teams select in the middle of each round. If there is an even number of teams, an expansion team will select in the middle position that is closest to the first pick. There were three nonplayoff teams in 2015, and ranked from worst record to best record, they were

1. Springfield Lasers
2. San Diego Aviators
3. Boston Lobsters

However, the Lobsters folded prior to the draft. Therefore, the Lasers and Aviators were the only two nonplayoff teams and assigned the preliminary first and second positions. The Philadelphia Freedoms lost the 2015 Eastern Conference Championship Match and had a worse record than the California Dream, which lost the Western Conference Championship Match. Therefore, the Freedoms were assigned the preliminary third position. Since the Dream franchise was terminated, it was not assigned a draft position. The Orange County Breakers, playing in 2015, as the Austin Aces, lost the WTT Final and were assigned the preliminary fourth draft position. The WTT Champion Washington Kastles were assigned the preliminary fifth draft position. The expansion New York Empire was assigned the third draft position by rule, since there was an even number of teams, and this is the middle position closest to the first position. This resulted in the Freedoms, Breakers and Kastles all moving down one position from their preliminary positions. Each team could protect certain players from its 2015 roster. Marquee players or doubles teams and wildcard players could be protected if they appeared in a match for the team in 2015. Exempt, roster and substitute players who appeared in at least three matches for the team in 2015, could also be protected. Teams could also protect players who qualified for protection based on match appearances in 2014, but were unable to play in 2015, due to injury. Teams holding the right to protect players could trade those rights before or during the draft. If a team chooses a roster-exempt player, one who is not required to be a full-time member of the team, it is possible for a team to make four selections in the roster player portion of the draft and not have two male and two female full-time players. In such cases, these teams are permitted to make selections in additional rounds of the roster player draft until they have a complete roster. Teams that have two male and two female full-time players may select roster-exempt players in rounds past the fourth round. The selections made are shown in the tables below.

Marquee draft – first round

No.	Team	Player chosen	Prot?	Notes
1	Springfield Lasers	(United States) John Isner	Y	
2	San Diego Aviators	(United States) James Blake	N	Designated
3	New York Empire	(United States) Andy Roddick	Y	
4	Philadelphia Freedoms	(Denmark) Caroline Wozniacki	N	
5	Washington Kastles (Note: The Orange County Breakers traded the fifth pick in the first round of the marquee player portion of the draft to the Washington Kastles in exchange for undisclosed consideration.)	(United States) Bob and Mike Bryan	N	Doubles team
6	Washington Kastles	(Switzerland) Martina Hingis	Y	

Marquee draft – second round

No.	Team	Player chosen	Prot?	Notes
1	Springfield Lasers	Pass	–	
2	San Diego Aviators	Pass	–	
3	New York Empire	Pass	–	
4	Philadelphia Freedoms	Pass	–	
5	Orange County Breakers	Pass	–	
6	Washington Kastles	(United States) Mardy Fish	N	

Roster draft – first round

No.	Team	Player chosen	Prot?	Notes
1	New York Empire (Note: The Springfield Lasers traded the first pick in the first round and the first pick in the fourth round of the roster player portion of the draft to the New York Empire in exchange for the third pick in the first round and the third pick in the third round of the roster player portion of the draft.)	(United States) Christina McHale	N	
2	San Diego Aviators	(United States) Shelby Rogers	N	
3	Springfield Lasers	(Canada) Daniel Nestor	N	
4	Philadelphia Freedoms	(Slovakia) Lukáš Lacko	N	
5	Orange County Breakers	(United States) Nicole Gibbs	Y	
6	Washington Kastles	(United States) Sam Querrey	Y	Exempt

Roster draft – second round

No.	Team	Player chosen	Prot?	Notes
1	Springfield Lasers	(Germany) Benjamin Becker	N	
2	San Diego Aviators	(South Africa) Raven Klaasen	Y	
3	New York Empire	(Argentina) Guido Pella	N	
4	Philadelphia Freedoms	(Russia) Daria Kasatkina	N	
5	Orange County Breakers	(Russia) Alla Kudryavtseva	Y	
6	Washington Kastles	(India) Leander Paes	Y	Exempt

Roster draft – third round

No.	Team	Player chosen	Prot?	Notes
1	Springfield Lasers	(Australia) Daria Gavrilova	N	
2	San Diego Aviators	(United Kingdom) Daniel Evans	N	
3	Springfield Lasers	(Netherlands) Michaëlla Krajicek	N	
4	Philadelphia Freedoms	(France) Fabrice Martin	N	
5	Orange County Breakers	(United States) Scott Lipsky	N	
6	Washington Kastles	(United States) Madison Brengle	Y	

Roster draft – fourth round

No.	Team	Player chosen	Prot?	Notes
1	New York Empire	(Argentina) María Irigoyen	N	
2	San Diego Aviators	(Croatia) Darija Jurak	Y	
3	New York Empire	(Austria) Oliver Marach	N	
4	Philadelphia Freedoms	(United Kingdom) Naomi Broady	N	
5	Orange County Breakers	(United States) Dennis Novikov	N	
6	Washington Kastles	(Australia) Anastasia Rodionova	Y	

Roster draft – fifth round

No.	Team	Player chosen	Prot?	Notes
1	Springfield Lasers	Pass	–	
2	San Diego Aviators	Pass	–	
3	New York Empire	Pass	–	
4	Philadelphia Freedoms	(United States) Donald Young	N	Exempt
5	Orange County Breakers	Pass	–	
6	Washington Kastles	Pass	–	

== Event chronology ==
=== Off-season ===
- December 14, 2015: The Austin Aces announced that the team would move back to Orange County, California for the 2016 season and be renamed the Orange County Breakers.
- January 13, 2016: WTT announced that the California Dream franchise had been terminated due to noncompliance with the team's obligations to the league.
- February 17, 2016: WTT announced that the Boston Lobsters had folded, because the league had been unable to find a new owner for the franchise.
- February 17, 2016: WTT announced an expansion team for New York City to be named the New York Empire that will begin play in 2016. The team announced it would play its home matches at Forest Hills Stadium in Forest Hills, Queens, New York City, New York.
- March 25, 2016: WTT conducted its 2016 player draft.

=== Regular season ===
- July 31, 2016: The New York Empire made its debut with a home loss to the Washington Kastles, 22–15.
- August 4, 2016: The New York Empire secured the first win in franchise history, when it defeated the Springfield Lasers, 19–15, at Forest Hills Stadium.
- August 10, 2016: With a record of 2 wins and 7 losses, the New York Empire was eliminated from postseason contention when it lost to the Philadelphia Freedoms, 17–16, in a super tiebreaker (7–3).
- August 10, 2016: With a record of 2 wins and 7 losses, the Springfield Lasers were eliminated from postseason contention when they lost to the Orange County Breakers, 22–19, in extended play. It is the second consecutive season the Lasers have missed the postseason.
- August 11, 2016: With a record of 8 wins and 2 losses, the Orange County Breakers clinched a berth in the WTT Finals for the second consecutive season when they defeated the New York Empire, 19–17.
- August 12, 2016: With a record of 5 wins and 5 losses, the five-time defending champion Washington Kastles were eliminated from postseason contention, when they won the third set of men's doubles in their match against the Springfield Lasers, 5–3. At the start of play, the Kastles could only qualify for the postseason in the case of a three-way tie with the Philadelphia Freedoms and the San Diego Aviators. In games won in matches against common opponents, the Aviators led with 149 with one common-opponent match to play, the Freedoms had 136 with one common-opponent match to play, and the Kastles had 118 with two common-opponent matches to play. Therefore, the maximum number of games the Kastles could win in matches against common opponents was 168 at the start of play. The Aviators won 19 games in the first four sets of their match against the New York Empire, which started one hour earlier than the Kastles' match in Springfield, to reach 168 games won against common opponents. The Kastles still could have won the next step of the three-way standings tiebreaker on fewest games lost in matches against common opponents. However, after dropping the first two sets of the match, the only way the Kastles could still reach 168 games won against common opponents was by losing the first four sets and winning the match, 25–24, in a super tiebreaker. Therefore, in an odd set of circumstances, when the Kastles won the third set of their match, moments after the fourth set of the Aviators-Empire match was completed, the maximum number of games the Kastles could win against common opponents was reduced to 166, resulting in mathematical elimination. It is the first time the Kastles have missed the postseason since 2010. The Kastles went on to win the match in which their run of championships came to an end, 21–20.
- August 12, 2016: With a record of 8 wins and 3 losses, the San Diego Aviators clinched a berth in the WTT Finals with a 24–16 victory over the New York Empire. It is the Aviators' first postseason appearance since 2014, and first appearance in the WTT Finals for the franchise, since they lost in the 2010 Finals playing as the New York Sportimes. The Aviators victory also eliminated the Philadelphia Freedoms, who had won earlier in the evening to improve their record to 6 wins and 5 losses, from postseason contention. It is the first time the Freedoms have missed the postseason since 2013.
- August 13, 2016: With a record of 8 wins and 3 losses, the San Diego Aviators clinched the best regular-season record in WTT, when the Washington Kastles defeated the Orange County Breakers, 25–19, in extended play. This made the Aviators the top seed in the WTT Finals and gave them the option to set the order of play.

=== WTT Finals ===
- August 26, 2016: The San Diego Aviators defeated the Orange County Breakers, 25–14 in extended play, at Forest Hills Stadium in New York City to win the King Trophy as 2016 WTT champions. The Aviators were led by WTT Finals Most Valuable Player Raven Klaasen who teamed with Darija Jurak to take the opening set of mixed doubles, 5–2, and later with 2016 WTT Male MVP Ryan Harrison for another 5–2 set win in the third set of men's doubles. Shelby Rogers took the second set of women's singles from 2016 WTT Female MVP Nicole Gibbs, 5–2, before teaming with Jurak for another 5–2 set win in the fourth set of women's doubles. After losing the fifth set in a tiebreaker, Harrison, who won a US Open qualifying match earlier in the day to secure a spot in the Grand Slam tournament, sealed the victory when he held serve in the second game of extended play. "It feels really nice to get the MVP award, but it feels a bit undeserving, because our whole team played very well," said Klaasen. "We were apart for four days, and when we saw each other again last night, it felt like we had been apart for a year. Our team chemistry has been great. We will be friends for the rest of our lives." Aviators coach John Lloyd, who was named 2016 WTT Coach of the Year a few days earlier, said, "It brings a lot of memories back; I played back in the US Open when it was on grass and clay. In fact, on this court I lost to the great Björn Borg. It was nice to play on this beautiful court. To come back and win this title was great." It was the third WTT title for the Aviators franchise, having won in 2005, playing as the New York Sportimes and in 2008, playing as the New York Buzz, and it was the team's first WTT championship since moving to San Diego in 2014.

== Standings ==
Pos	Team	MP	W	L	PCT	MB	GW	GL
1	San Diego Aviators	12	8	4	.667	0	249	228
2	Orange County Breakers	12	8	4	.667	0	252	216
3	Washington Kastles	12	7	5	.583	1	241	228
4	Philadelphia Freedoms	12	7	5	.583	1	238	230
5	Springfield Lasers	12	4	8	.333	4	231	250
6	New York Empire	12	2	10	.167	6	195	254

2016 WTT Finals

Notes: San Diego and Orange County split their four regular-season head-to-head matches with each team winning twice. San Diego won the tiebreaker on games won in head-to-head matches, 82–77. Washington and Philadelphia split their two regular-season matches with each team winning once. Washington won the tiebreaker on games won in head-to-head matches, 42–41.

== Results table ==
Abbreviation and Color Key: New York Empire – NYE • Orange County Breakers – OCB • Philadelphia Freedoms – PHI San Diego Aviators – SDA • Springfield Lasers – SPR • Washington Kastles – WAS Win • Loss • Home • Away
Team	Match											
Team	1	2	3	4	5	6	7	8	9	10	11	12
New York Empire	WAS	PHI	WAS	SPR	SDA	OCB	WAS	WAS	PHI	OCB	SDA	SPR
New York Empire	15–22	19–22 (EP)	14–23	19–15	18–24	8–25	21–19	13–22 (EP)	16–17 (STB, 3–7)	17–19	16–24	19–22 (EP)
Orange County Breakers	SDA	SDA	SDA	SDA	WAS	NYE	PHI	SPR	SPR	NYE	PHI	WAS
Orange County Breakers	19–20	22–20	15–23 (EP)	21–19	25–10	25–8	23–17	24–17	22–19 (EP)	19–17	18–21	19–25 (EP)
Philadelphia Freedoms	SPR	NYE	SPR	WAS	SPR	SPR	OCB	SDA	NYE	WAS	OCB	SDA
Philadelphia Freedoms	23–17	22–19 (EP)	20–16	23–18	19–24	18–23 (EP)	17–23	15–23 (EP)	17–16 (STB, 7–3)	18–24	21–18	25–9
San Diego Aviators	OCB	OCB	OCB	OCB	NYE	WAS	SPR	PHI	WAS	SPR	NYE	PHI
San Diego Aviators	20–19	20–22	23–15 (EP)	19–21	24–18	21–15	22–19 (EP)	23–15 (EP)	23–20	21–23 (EP)	24–16	9–25
Springfield Lasers	PHI	WAS	PHI	NYE	PHI	PHI	SDA	OCB	OCB	SDA	WAS	NYE
Springfield Lasers	17–23	16–22	16–20	15–19	24–19	23–18 (EP)	19–22 (EP)	17–24	19–22 (EP)	23–21 (EP)	20–21	22–19 (EP)
Washington Kastles	NYE	SPR	NYE	PHI	OCB	SDA	NYE	NYE	SDA	PHI	SPR	OCB
Washington Kastles	22–15	22–16	23–14	18–23	10–25	15–21	19–21	22–13 (EP)	20–23	24–18	21–20	25–19 (EP)

== WTT Finals match summary ==
August 26, 2016 at Forest Hills Stadium, New York City, New York: #1 SAN DIEGO AVIATORS (Note: San Diego, as the top seed, was treated as the home team under WTT rules for determining order of play.) 25, #2 Orange County Breakers 14 (extended play)

- Mixed Doubles: Darija Jurak and Raven Klaasen (Aviators) def. Alla Kudryavtseva and Scott Lipsky (Breakers), 5–2
- Women's Singles: Shelby Rogers (Aviators) def. Nicole Gibbs (Breakers), 5–2
- Men's Doubles: Ryan Harrison and Raven Klaasen (Aviators) def. Scott Lipsky and Dennis Novikov (Breakers), 5–2
- Women's Doubles: Darija Jurak and Shelby Rogers (Aviators) def. Nicole Gibbs and Alla Kudryavtseva (Breakers), 5–2
- Men's Singles: Dennis Novikov (Breakers) def. Ryan Harrison (Aviators), 5–4
- Extended Play – Men's Singles: Ryan Harrison (Aviators) 1, Dennis Novikov (Breakers) 1

== Individual statistical leaders ==
The tables below show the WTT players who had the highest regular-season winning percentages in each of the league's five events. Only players who played in at least 40% of the total number of games played by their team in a particular event are eligible to be listed among the official WTT league leaders for that event.

Men's singles

Rank	Player	Team	GP	GW	GL	PCT
1	Ryan Harrison	San Diego Aviators	74	45	29	.608
2	Benjamin Becker	Springfield Lasers	97	50	47	.515
3	Dennis Novikov	Orange County Breakers	88	44	44	.500

Women's singles

Rank	Player	Team	GP	GW	GL	PCT
1	Madison Brengle	Washington Kastles	80	49	31	.613
2	Nicole Gibbs	Orange County Breakers	88	53	35	.602
3	Shelby Rogers	San Diego Aviators	92	47	45	.511

Men's doubles

Rank	Player	Team	GP	GW	GL	PCT
1	Raven Klaasen	San Diego Aviators	92	54	38	.587
2	Ryan Harrison	San Diego Aviators	70	41	29	.586
3	Treat Huey	Washington Kastles	44	24	20	.545
4	Fabrice Martin	Philadelphia Freedoms	103	56	47	.544
5	Lukáš Lacko	Philadelphia Freedoms	70	37	33	.529
6	Dennis Novikov	Orange County Breakers	86	43	43	.500

Women's doubles

Rank	Player	Team	GP	GW	GL	PCT
1	Nicole Gibbs	Orange County Breakers	91	52	39	.571
1	Alla Kudryavtseva	Orange County Breakers	91	52	39	.571
3	Madison Brengle	Washington Kastles	70	37	33	.529
3	Andreja Klepač	Washington Kastles	70	37	33	.529
5	Michaëlla Krajicek	Springfield Lasers	93	47	46	.505
5	Pauline Parmentier	Springfield Lasers	93	47	46	.505

Mixed doubles

Rank	Player	Team	GP	GW	GL	PCT
1	Naomi Broady	Philadelphia Freedoms	97	55	42	.567
1	Fabrice Martin	Philadelphia Freedoms	97	55	42	.567
3	Alla Kudryavtseva	Orange County Breakers	98	52	46	.531
3	Scott Lipsky	Orange County Breakers	98	52	46	.531
5	Michaëlla Krajicek	Springfield Lasers	94	49	45	.521
6	Darija Jurak	San Diego Aviators	100	47	53	.470
6	Raven Klaasen	San Diego Aviators	100	47	53	.470

== Individual honors ==
Award	Recipient	Team
Female Most Valuable Player	Nicole Gibbs	Orange County Breakers
Male Most Valuable Player	Ryan Harrison	San Diego Aviators
Female Rookie of the Year	Michaëlla Krajicek	Springfield Lasers
Male Rookie of the Year	Fabrice Martin	Philadelphia Freedoms
Coach of the Year	John Lloyd	San Diego Aviators
WTT Finals Most Valuable Player	Raven Klaasen	San Diego Aviators

== Team statistics ==
The tables below show the regular-season winning percentages of each team in each of the league's five events.

Men's singles

Rank	Team	GP	GW	GL	PCT
1	San Diego Aviators	95	54	41	.568
2	Springfield Lasers	108	55	53	.509
3	Philadelphia Freedoms	93	47	46	.505
4	Orange County Breakers	97	49	48	.505
5	New York Empire	99	49	50	.495
6	Washington Kastles	98	41	57	.418

Women's singles

Rank	Team	GP	GW	GL	PCT
1	Washington Kastles	80	49	31	.613
2	Orange County Breakers	88	53	35	.602
3	San Diego Aviators	92	47	45	.511
4	Philadelphia Freedoms	84	38	46	.452
5	Springfield Lasers	88	39	49	.443
6	New York Empire	74	27	47	.365

Men's doubles

Rank	Team	GP	GW	GL	PCT
1	San Diego Aviators	92	54	38	.587
2	Philadelphia Freedoms	103	56	47	.544
3	Washington Kastles	102	50	52	.490
4	Orange County Breakers	94	46	48	.489
5	New York Empire	105	50	55	.476
6	Springfield Lasers	98	41	57	.418

Women's doubles

Rank	Team	GP	GW	GL	PCT
1	Orange County Breakers	91	52	39	.571
2	Washington Kastles	92	51	41	.554
3	Springfield Lasers	93	47	46	.505
4	San Diego Aviators	98	47	51	.480
5	Philadelphia Freedoms	91	42	49	.462
6	New York Empire	83	35	48	.422

Mixed doubles

Rank	Team	GP	GW	GL	PCT
1	Philadelphia Freedoms	97	55	42	.567
2	Orange County Breakers	98	52	46	.531
3	Springfield Lasers	94	49	45	.521
4	Washington Kastles	97	50	47	.515
5	San Diego Aviators	100	47	53	.470
6	New York Empire	88	34	54	.386

== Television ==
The 2016 season was the third year of a four-year television rights contract between WTT and ESPN, Inc. The WTT Final was streamed live on ESPN3, which also streamed one match each night during the regular season. ESPN2's live telecast of the WTT Final began at 5:00 pm EDT, one hour after the match's start time.

The following regular-season matches were streamed live on ESPN3 and rebroadcast the following day on the Tennis Channel:

- 6:00 pm EDT, Sunday, July 31: Washington Kastles at New York Empire
- 7:00 pm EDT, Monday, August 1: Springfield Lasers at Washington Kastles
- 7:00 pm EDT, Tuesday, August 2: Springfield Lasers at Philadelphia Freedoms
- 10:00 pm EDT, Wednesday, August 3: San Diego Aviators at Orange County Breakers
- 7:00 pm EDT, Thursday, August 4: Springfield Lasers at Philadelphia Freedoms
- 10:00 pm EDT, Friday, August 5: New York Empire at San Diego Aviators
- 10:00 pm EDT, Saturday, August 6: Washington Kastles at San Diego Aviators
- 10:00 pm EDT, Sunday, August 7: Philadelphia Freedoms at Orange County Breakers
- 7:00 pm EDT, Monday, August 8: New York Empire at Washington Kastles
- 7:00 pm EDT, Tuesday, August 9: Washington Kastles at New York Empire
- 7:00 pm EDT, Wednesday, August 10: New York Empire at Philadelphia Freedoms
- 8:00 pm EDT, Thursday, August 11: San Diego Aviators at Springfield Lasers
- 7:00 pm EDT, Friday, August 12: San Diego Aviators at New York Empire
- 5:00 pm EDT, Saturday, August 13: Orange County Breakers at Washington Kastles

Select matches streamed live by ESPN3 were rebroadcast by regional sports networks Altitude Sports and Entertainment, Comcast SportsNet affiliates, Mediacom Connections and MSG.

== Sponsorship ==
On December 8, 2014, WTT announced that its title-sponsorship agreement with Mylan N.V. was extended for two more years through the 2017 season. As part of its partnership with WTT, Mylan will continue to sponsor events at which children meet with WTT players and are introduced to tennis, charitable events and the Mylan Aces program which allows each team to select a local charity for which it can earn money donated by Mylan by recording the most aces in the league on a given day during the regular season.

== See also ==
- Team tennis
