= New York Empire (tennis) =

World TeamTennis team

- Sport: Team tennis
- Founded: February 17, 2016
- League: World TeamTennis
- Team history: New York Empire; 2016–present
- Based in: New York City
- Stadium: Barclays Center
- Colors: Navy blue, orange, white
- Owner: NY TeamTennis LLC represented by Michael Coakley
- Head coach: Luke Jensen
- General manager: Michele Cope
- Championships: 1 (2020)
- Mascot: Hudson
- Website: www.nyempiretennis.com

The New York Empire is a World TeamTennis (WTT) team based in New York City.

The team played its inaugural 2016 season at the Forest Hills Stadium in Forest Hills, New York, before moving to Flushing in 2017. In 2019, the team moved to the Cary Leeds Center for Tennis & Learning in the Bronx, New York City. The team will be based at Barclays Center in Brooklyn for its 2026 season.

== Team history ==
=== Founding of franchise ===
On February 17, 2016, WTT announced that the league would return to New York City for the 2016 season. The Empire would play its home matches at historic Forest Hills Stadium. The 14,000-seat stadium was to be reconfigured to seat approximately 2,500 fans for Empire home matches. Concurrent with that announcement, the league also reported that the newly formed Empire had acquired the rights to former world number 1 male player Andy Roddick in a trade with the Orange County Breakers. Patrick McEnroe, who is from Long Island, was named the team's head coach.

=== Inaugural season ===
The NY Empire recorded a record of 2 wins and 10 losses in its inaugural season and finished last in the WTT standings.

The NY Empire debuted on July 31, 2016, with a home match against the five-time defending WTT champion Washington Kastles. The match opened with Guido Pella and Neal Skupski dropping a men's doubles tiebreaker. The Empire managed to win only one set, when Pella took the men's singles, 5–2. The Kastles won the match, 22–15.

Skupski had been signed to replace Oliver Marach on the roster, after Marach was selected to represent Austria at the 2016 Summer Olympics. The Empire also lost Pella, who represented Argentina at the 2016 Summer Olympics, after he appeared in the first three matches of the season. He was replaced by Long Island native Noah Rubin for one match, Daniel Nguyen for two matches and Marcus Willis for the remainder of the season.

After opening the season with three straight losses, the Empire secured the first win in franchise history on August 4, 2016, when it defeated the Springfield Lasers, 19–15, at Forest Hills Stadium. Rubin teamed with Skupski to take the opening set of men's doubles, 5–2. After dropping the second and third sets, the Empire found itself trailing, 12–9. In the fourth set, New Jersey native Christina McHale and María Irigoyen held all three of their service games while breaking Michaëlla Krajicek and Pauline Parmentier twice for a 5–1 women's doubles set win that gave the Empire a 14–13 lead heading to the final set. Irigoyen and Skupski held all four of their service games and managed a break to win the fifth set of mixed doubles, 5–2, and close out the victory.

Andy Roddick appeared in two matches and lost both of his men's singles sets. Statistically, Pella was the team's strongest player, winning 65% of his men's singles games and 53% of his men's doubles games. Willis was also solid in men's singles, winning 54% of his games. After a difficult start during which McHale lost 36 of her first 48 women's singles games, she finished the season by winning 15 of her final 24 games. Playing men's singles and doubles in his only match appearance, Rubin recorded wins in 9 of his 16 games.

=== 2017: A new look ===
The Empire had the first selection in each round of WTT's 2017 drafts due to finishing the 2016 season in sixth place. The Empire traded the first overall selection in the Marquee Draft to the Springfield Lasers for the second overall pick and undisclosed consideration. The Lasers used that pick to select Jack Sock. With the second selection in the first round, the Empire chose Eugenie Bouchard and left Andy Roddick unprotected. In the second round, the Empire selected John Isner, who had been left unprotected by the Lasers. The Empire's third round selection was Mardy Fish, who had been left unprotected by the Washington Kastles.

After playing its inaugural season at Forest Hills Stadium, the Empire announced at the draft that its 2017 home matches would be played on Court 17 at the USTA Billie Jean King National Tennis Center in Flushing, Queens, New York City. The stadium has seating for 2,500 fans. The Empire also introduced its new general manager, Michele Cope, who said "Court 17 is a great showcase court for New York Empire matches. Fans will be close to great professional team competition, and also enjoy a fan-friendly and entertaining atmosphere."

On March 1, the Empire named International Tennis Hall of Famer Gigi Fernández as the team's new head coach, replacing Patrick McEnroe. Fernández said, "This is going to be a fantastic summer for the New York Empire with a really strong team that already includes John [Isner], Genie [Bouchard] and Mardy [Fish]. We'll finalize the remainder of the roster very soon, and then it's time to start thinking about match strategy. I really can't wait to work with these amazing athletes." McEnroe had recently taken a position with Sportime NY as co-director of the John McEnroe Tennis Academy.

The Empire finished its second season in the league with a 7–7 record, more than tripling its win total from 2016. The team started off the season on July 16 with a thrilling home win over the Philadelphia Freedoms, which marquee player John Isner clinched with a 5–2 final set win in Men's Singles over Donald Young. The next night, the Empire traveled to Philadelphia and beat the Freedoms once again, with Mardy Fish taking down Young in a winner-take-all tiebreak in the final set.

Having already achieved last season's win total after two matches, the Empire looked to keep the momentum going in Washington. Fish overcame a two-game deficit to push the match into a deciding supertiebreak, but came up short against Frances Tiafoe to hand the Empire its first loss of the season. After a 25–13 loss at home to Philadelphia, the Empire was able to get back above .500 by winning at home against the Orange County Breakers in a match that was moved indoors due to rain.

The team then went on the road for a week, losing two matches in California before beating both Philadelphia and Washington. It returned home on July 27 with a 5–4 record, but despite the presence of Eugenie Bouchard, it was again swept by the Breakers and San Diego Aviators. Knowing that it would need to win the rest of its matches to have a chance at qualifying for the WTT Finals, the Empire had a convincing 25–18 win over Washington before closing out its home schedule with a memorable win over the Springfield Lasers, in which Marcus Willis saved a match point and defeated Benjamin Becker in a final-set tiebreak.

At 7–6, the Empire's playoff hopes were slim, but still alive, as the team traveled to Springfield to play its final match of the season. Needing a win and losses from both the Aviators and Breakers, the Empire won two of the first three sets. The match was eventually decided in a Supertiebreak, where New York's Kirsten Flipkens lost to Sorana Cîrstea, ending the Empire's playoff hopes but at the same time clinching the franchise's first top three finish. Orange County and San Diego’ s subsequent wins meant that the Empire finished the season 2 matches out of first place.

=== 2018: Last season under Fernández ===
On March 6, 2018, the Empire announced that Fernández would return to coach the team for the second season in a row, in hopes of guiding the franchise to its first trip to the WTT Finals. "We were one match away from making the finals," said Fernández, "and we lost a few very close matches. This year, we hope to improve on that by making the finals and having a chance to bring the King Trophy to Billie Jean's home city."

The following week, the team announced the protection of Franchise players Isner, Bouchard, and Fish, along with doubles specialist Skupski, the only remaining player from the team's inaugural season at Forest Hills. At the 2018 World TeamTennis Draft in Indian Wells, California, the Empire filled out their roster by selecting Tatjana Maria, Dennis Novikov, and doubles specialist María José Martínez Sánchez.

=== 2019: Championship pursuit ===
Led by new head coach Luke Jensen, the team made its first trip to the WTT Playoffs falling to the Springfield Lasers in the WTT Championship at Orleans Arena in Las Vegas on August 3, 2019.

== Team rosters ==
=== 2016 roster ===
- (Argentina) María Irigoyen
- (United States) Christina McHale
- (United States) Daniel Nguyen
- (Argentina) Guido Pella
- (United States) Andy Roddick
- (United States) Noah Rubin
- (United Kingdom) Neal Skupski
- (United Kingdom) Marcus Willis
- (United States) Head Coach, Patrick McEnroe

=== 2017 roster ===
- (Canada) Eugenie Bouchard
- (United States) Mardy Fish
- (Belgium) Kirsten Flipkens
- (United States) John Isner
- (United States) Maria Sanchez
- (United Kingdom) Neal Skupski
- (United Kingdom) Marcus Willis
- (United States) Head Coach, Gigi Fernández

=== 2018 roster ===
- (Canada) Eugenie Bouchard
- (United States) Mardy Fish
- (United States) John Isner
- (Germany) Tatjana Maria
- (Spain) María José Martínez Sánchez
- (United States) Dennis Novikov
- (United Kingdom) Neal Skupski
- (United States) Head Coach, Gigi Fernández

=== 2019 roster ===
- (United States) John Isner
- (Belgium) Kirsten Flipkens
- (United States) Ulises Blanch
- (United Kingdom) Neal Skupski
- (Spain) María José Martínez Sánchez
- (United States) Head Coach, Luke Jensen

=== 2020 roster ===
- (United States) Hailey Baptiste
- (Belgium) Kim Clijsters
- (United States) Ulises Blanch
- (United Kingdom) Neal Skupski
- (United States) Nicole Melichar
- (Germany) Sabine Lisicki
- (United States) Jack Sock
- (United States) CoCo Vandeweghe
- (United States) Head Coach, Luke Jensen

== See also ==
- Sports in New York City
- New York Sportimes
- New York Buzz
- New York Apples
