= Newport Beach Tennis Club =

Tennis club in Newport Beach, California

- Location within the Los Angeles metropolitan area
- Type: Tennis club
- Location: Newport Beach, California
- Coordinates: 33°38′30″N 117°52′29″W
- Area: 7.5 acres (3.04 ha; 0.01 sq mi)
- Elevation: 111 feet (34 m)
- Opened: 1966
- Founder: George Holstein and Larry Johnson
- Designer: Dick Skeen, General Manager and Designer
- Open: 8:00 am–10:00 pm
- Parking: on premises
- Website: nbtctennis.com

The Newport Beach Tennis Club is a tennis club located in Newport Beach, California with an entrance at 2601 Eastbluff Drive.

The club opened in 1966 on land owned by George Holstein, who developed Eastbluff and partnered with Larry Johnson. They hired renowned tennis professional, Dick Skeen to design the Club and be the first General Manager. It has 19 tennis courts with lighting, a junior Olympic swimming pool and a fitness center. There is also a pro shop, a restaurant, a bar, and available catering service. Rod Laver and Roy Emerson were early members in the sixties and Tony Prodan was the longtime Head Tennis Professional. The club is situated on 7.5 acres (3 hectares) of land.

The United States, Captained by Tony Trabert, played South Africa at the Club in the 1977 Davis Cup Americas Zone Semifinals.

On January 27, 2016, the Orange County Breakers of World Team Tennis announced that they would play their home matches at the Newport Beach Tennis Club. Breakers coach Rick Leach gives lessons at the club.
