= Marquee player =

Athlete considered to be exceptional

A marquee player is an athlete who is considered exceptionally popular, skilled, or otherwise outstanding, especially in professional sports. Its name comes from theater marquees, on which the names of the stars of productions in said theater are often emblazoned in order to draw spectators. Several sports leagues have specific definitions and rules regarding the designation and treatment of marque players.

In the Liga 1 of the Football Association of Indonesia, each team is allowed to designate one marquee player.

In the A-League of the Football Federation Australia, each team is allowed to designate two marquee players whose salaries are exempted from the league's salary cap. Similarly, in English Premiership rugby marquee players are excluded from salary cap constraints.

The All India Football Federation requires each I-League team to feature one marquee player. The federation defines "marquee players" as foreign players who have represented their country in one of several international championships. Teams are also allowed to propose other skilled players for the designation. Marquee players were also used in the Indian Super League and are currently used in Caribbean Premier League, Mzansi Super League and Minor League Cricket.

In World TeamTennis, a marquee player is not required to play the entire season and is compensated on a per-match basis. Marquee players are drafted in a marquee draft prior to the roster draft.
