= Orange County Breakers =

Californian tennis team

- Sport: Tennis
- Founded: 2003
- League: World TeamTennis
- Team history: Newport Beach Breakers; 2003–2011; Orange County Breakers; 2012–2013; Austin Aces; 2014–2015; Orange County Breakers 2016–2021
- Based in: Newport Beach, California
- Stadium: Breakers Stadium at the Palisades Tennis Club
- Colors: Blue, lime green, black, white
- Owner: Eric Davidson
- Head coach: Rick Leach
- General manager: Allen Hardison
- Championships: 2004, 2017, 2021

The Orange County Breakers was a World TeamTennis (WTT) franchise founded in 2003, owned by Laguna Beach businessman Eric Davidson. The Breakers won the WTT Championship in 2004, 2017 and 2021. In 2014, the franchise moved to Greater Austin, Texas, where it was known as the Austin Aces. On December 14, 2015, the Aces announced that the team would move back to Orange County, California for the 2016 season and be renamed the Orange County Breakers. In 2016, the Breakers played their home matches at Breakers Stadium at the Newport Beach Tennis Club. In 2017, the Breakers returned to playing at the Palisades Tennis Club, the venue where they played from 2003 to 2006.

== Results ==
The Breakers raised the King Trophy in 2004, 2017 and 2021 as WTT Champions. The 2005, 2006 and 2016 Breakers reached the WTT Finals.

Year	Breakers	SR	Opponent	FS
2004	Newport Beach Breakers		Delaware Smash	23–17
2005	Newport Beach Breakers		New York Sportimes	18-21
2006	Newport Beach Breakers		Philadelphia Freedoms	14-21
2016	Orange County Breakers		San Diego Aviators	14-25
2017	Orange County Breakers		San Diego Aviators	22-18
2021	Orange County Breakers		Springfield Lasers	21-13

== See also ==
- World TeamTennis
