= 2015 Washington Kastles season =

World TeamTennis champions

Eastern Conference champions
- Conference: 1st Eastern

Record
- 2015 record: 10 wins, 4 losses
- Home record: 5 wins, 2 losses
- Road record: 5 wins, 2 losses
- Games won–lost: 289–228

Team info
- Owner(s): Mark Ein
- General manager: Kevin Wynne
- Coach: Murphy Jensen
- Captain: Leander Paes
- Stadium: Kastles Stadium at the Charles E. Smith Center (capacity: 3,212)

The 2015 Washington Kastles season was the eighth season of the franchise in World TeamTennis (WTT).

The Kastles won their WTT-record fifth consecutive King Trophy when they defeated the Austin Aces in the WTT Championship Match. The Kastles were led by Leander Paes, who was named WTT Final Most Valuable Player, and Anastasia Rodionova, who was named WTT Female Co-Most Valuable Player.

== Season recap ==
=== Draft ===
At the WTT Draft on March 16, 2015, it was announced that the world's number 1 female player Serena Williams had been assigned by the league to the Kastles as a designated player. The Kastles also protected Martina Hingis, Venus Williams, Leander Paes and Anastasia Rodionova. They used their first-round selection in the roster portion of the draft to pick roster-exempt player Sam Querrey. The league's designation of Serena Williams made it impossible for her to be drafted by any other team and relieved the Kastles of having to draft her along with her sister Venus as a marquee doubles team in the second round of the marquee portion of the draft. This will allow the Kastles to protect only one of Serena and Venus in the following season's draft should the other decide not to participate in the league in 2016.

=== Other player transactions ===
On May 6, 2015, the Kastles signed Madison Brengle as a substitute player.

On June 26, 2015, the Kastles signed Denis Kudla, a resident of nearby Arlington County, Virginia, as a substitute player.

On July 10, 2015, the Kastles announced the signing of Rajeev Ram as a substitute for Leander Paes, who was scheduled to play in the mixed doubles final at Wimbledon on the same day as the Kastles' season opener.

=== Serena Williams injured ===
On July 20, 2015, the Kastles announced that Serena Williams would be unable to play for the team in 2016, due to an injury. Fans attending the Kastles' July 21 match in which Williams was scheduled to play were given choices of either a $10 voucher redeemable at food concession stands, a 50% discount on purchases of Kastles gear up to $50 or a free ticket to a future home match.

=== Winning streak and a playoff berth after a mediocre start ===
After the team announced the injury to Serena Williams, the Kastles lost a road match in which she was originally scheduled to play that same evening against the Philadelphia Freedoms, 18–16, and saw their record drop to 4 wins and 3 losses at the midway point of the season.

Despite the slow start, one of the Kastles' wins came on July 18, by a score of 23–6 over the Freedoms. The 17-game margin of victory matched the largest in franchise history. The previous 17-game margins came on July 22, 2012, against the Kansas City Explorers and July 9, 2014, against the Boston Lobsters. Both of those matches ended with 25–8 final scores. In this match, the Kastles actually lost the opening set and trailed the match, 5–3. From there, they won 20 of the next 21 games, including all of the final 16.

As the Kastles embarked on the second half of their season, the team regrouped and dominated the Lobsters at home, 25–13, earning the first of what would be five straight wins. The Kastles set a new home attendance record in the match with 4,255 fans passing through the gates. After a night off, the Kastles faced the Lobsters again and repeated the feat of sweeping all five sets in a 25–14 victory.

The Kastles' big test came on July 24, when they went on the road to face the Austin Aces, who entered the match with 8 wins and only 1 loss. The Kastles had already suffered a home loss at the hands of the Aces early in the season. The Kastles won four of the five sets for a convincing 22–14 victory that improved their record to 7–3 and clinched the team's fifth consecutive playoff berth. Martina Hingis led the way, teaming with Leander Paes in the first set of mixed doubles and Anastasia Rodionova in the second set of women's doubles to give the Kastles an early 10–4 lead. Paes and Sam Querrey took the fourth set of men's doubles to extend the lead to 17–11, before Querrey took the final set of men's singles, 5–3, over Teymuraz Gabashvili to close out the match.

The following night, the Kastles clinched the top seed in the Eastern Conference and home-court advantage for the Eastern Conference Championship Match when the California Dream defeated the Lobsters, 21–19, in extended play.

=== Late-season showdown ===
On July 28, 2015, the four-time defending WTT champion Kastles visited he Austin Aces, who entered the match with 10 wins and 2 losses and a chance to clinch the best overall regular-season record in WTT for 2015. A win by the Kastles would have given them control of their own destiny in the race for the WTT's top overall seed, and they would need only a home victory the following night against the Boston Lobsters. The Kastles got off to a quick start, taking the first two sets and building a 10–7 lead. Leander Paes and Sam Querrey won a tiebreaker in the opening set of men's doubles, and Anastasia Rodionova and Madison Brengle took a 5–3 set win in women's doubles. But Teymuraz Gabashvili put the Aces ahead, 12–10, with a 5–0 set win over Querrey in men's singles. Rodionova and Paes bounced back with a 5–2 set win in mixed doubles to put the Kastles back in front, 15–14, heading into the final set of women's singles. Elina Svitolina topped Madison Brengle, 5–1, to give the Aces a 19–16 victory and the best overall regular-season record in WTT for 2015.

=== Eastern Conference championship ===
The Kastles hosted the Philadelphia Freedoms in the Eastern Conference Championship Match on July 30, 2015. It was a dominant performance for Washington, as the Kastles took all five sets en route to a 25–9 victory for their fifth consecutive Eastern Conference title. Martina Hingis teamed with Leander Paes in the opening set of mixed doubles for a 5–1 set win and later with Anastasia Rodionova to take a tiebreaker in the fourth set of women's doubles. Madison Brengle chipped in by saving three break points and winning both 3-all points for a 5–2 set win in women's singles. Paes and Sam Querrey took the men's doubles set, 5–2. Querrey closed out the match with a 5–0 whitewash of Robby Ginepri in men's singles.

=== A fifth consecutive King Trophy ===
The Kastles won their fifth consecutive King Trophy as WTT champions when they defeated the Austin Aces in the WTT Final on August 2, 2015. The Kastles were led by their captain, WTT Final Most Valuable Player Leander Paes, who teamed with Martina Hingis to take the opening set of mixed doubles from Teymuraz Gabashvili and Alla Kudryavtseva, 5–2, and then with Sam Querrey to win the men's doubles set, 5–3, over Gabashvili and Jarmere Jenkins. Hingis and Anastasia Rodionova took the second set of women's doubles in a tiebreaker after each team broke the other's serve three times. With the Kastles leading, 15–9, Querrey faced Gabashvili, who led WTT in winning percentage in men's singles during the regular season. Querrey served six aces and won 14 of his 16 first-serve points to hold in all four of his service games without facing a break point or a 3-all point. Gabashvili matched Querrey's performance with four holds of his own that also featured no break point or 3-all point opportunities. Querrey was able to prevail in the tiebreaker game to give the Kastles a 20–13 lead heading to the final set. Madison Brengle faced Elina Svitolina in the final set of women's singles. Svitolina fell behind a break early in the set but broke back twice for a 5–3 set win that sent the match to extended play with the Kastles leading the match, 23–18. Brengle hit a backhand winner in the first game of extended play to end the match and secure the title for the Kastles.

After the match, Paes said, "It's just a beautiful moment to share. I've had a really long career and done some really special things, and this is way up there with the best of them. I'd like to dedicate this MVP award to every single Kastles member, not only on the court, but behind the scenes, and every single Kastles fan." Kastles coach Murphy Jensen said, "It's a dream come true. It's so different. You'd think this'd get old hat, but it doesn't. It was a bigger challenge, because players were coming and going during the season. But to get them all to perform the way they did against an extremely tough team says a lot about our organization."

== Event chronology ==
- March 16, 2015: The Kastles protected Martina Hingis, Venus Williams, Leander Paes and Anastasia Rodionova and drafted Serena Williams and Sam Querrey at the WTT draft.
- May 6, 2015: The Kastles signed Madison Brengle as a substitute player.
- June 26, 2015: The Kastles signed Denis Kudla as a substitute player.
- July 10, 2015: The Kastles signed Rajeev Ram as a substitute player.
- July 24, 2015: With a record of 7 wins and 3 losses, the Kastles clinched a playoff berth with a 22–14 win over the Austin Aces.
- July 25, 2015: With a record of 7 wins and 3 losses, the Kastles clinched first place in the Eastern Conference and home-court advantage for the Eastern Conference Championship Match when the California Dream defeated the Boston Lobsters, 21–19, in extended play.
- July 30, 2015: The Kastles won the Eastern Conference championship with a 25–9 home victory against the Philadelphia Freedoms.
- August 2, 2015: The Kastles defeated the Austin Aces, 24–18, in extended play to win their fifth consecutive King Trophy as World TeamTennis Champions. Leander Paes was named WTT Final Most Valuable Player.

== Draft picks ==
As defending WTT champions, the Kastles selected last in each round of the draft. Unlike previous seasons in which WTT conducted its Marquee Player Draft and its Roster Player Draft on different dates about one month apart, the league conducted a single draft at the Indian Wells Tennis Garden in Indian Wells, California on March 16, 2015. The selections made by the Kastles are shown in the table below.

Draft type	Round	No.	Overall	Player chosen	Prot?	Notes
Marquee	1	7	7	(Switzerland) Martina Hingis	Y	
Marquee	2	7	14	(United States) Venus Williams	Y	
Marquee	3	7	21	(United States) Serena Williams	N	Designated
Roster	1	7	7	(United States) Sam Querrey	N	Exempt
Roster	2	7	14	(India) Leander Paes	Y	
Roster	3	7	21	Pass	–	
Roster	4	7	28	(Australia) Anastasia Rodionova	Y	
Roster	5 (Note: The Kastles drafted one exempt player during the first four rounds of the roster draft and could have selected another player in the fifth round.)	2	30	Pass	–	

== Match log ==
=== Regular season ===
Legend
Kastles Win	Kastles Loss
Home team in CAPS

Match	Date	Venue and location	Result and details	Record
1	July 12	Boston Lobsters Tennis Center at the Manchester Athletic Club; Manchester-by-the-Sea, Massachusetts	Washington Kastles 20, BOSTON LOBSTERS 17 * XD: Anastasia Rodionova/Rajeev Ram (Kastles) 5, Arantxa Parra Santonja/Scott Lipsky (Lobsters) 3 * WD: Madison Brengle/Anastasia Rodionova (Kastles) 5, Irina Falconi/Arantxa Parra Santonja (Lobsters) 2 * MS: Alex Kuznetsov (Lobsters) 5, Denis Kudla (Kastles) 0 * WS: Madison Brengle (Kastles) 5, Irina Falconi (Lobsters) 3 * MD: Denis Kudla/Rajeev Ram (Kastles) 5, Scott Lipsky/Alex Kuznetsov (Lobsters) 4	1–0
2	July 14	Kastles Stadium at the Charles E. Smith Center; Washington, District of Columbia	Austin Aces 22, WASHINGTON KASTLES 17 * MS: Denis Kudla (Kastles) 5, Teymuraz Gabashvili (Aces) 4 * WD: Nicole Gibbs/Alla Kudryavtseva (Aces) 5, Venus Williams/Anastasia Rodionova (Kastles) 1 * MD: Teymuraz Gabashvili/Jarmere Jenkins (Aces) 5, Denis Kudla/Leander Paes (Kastles) 3 * WS: Venus Williams (Kastles) 5, Nicole Gibbs (Aces) 3 * XD: Teymuraz Gabashvili/Alla Kudryavtseva (Aces) 5, Venus Williams/Leander Paes (Kastles) 3	1–1
3	July 15	Mediacom Stadium at Cooper Tennis Complex; Springfield, Missouri	Washington Kastles 21, SPRINGFIELD LASERS 16 * MS: Denis Kudla (Kastles) 5, Michael Russell (Lasers) 4 * WD: Anna-Lena Grönefeld/Varvara Lepchenko (Lasers) 5, Madison Brengle/Anastasia Rodionova (Kastles) 1 * MD: Denis Kudla/Leander Paes (Kastles) 5, Andre Begemann/Michael Russell (Lasers) 0 * WS: Madison Brengle (Kastles) 5, Varvara Lepchenko (Lasers) 3 * XD: Leander Paes/Anastasia Rodionova (Kastles) 5, Andre Begemann/Anna-Lena Grönefeld (Lasers) 4	2–1
4	July 16	Kastles Stadium at the Charles E. Smith Center; Washington, District of Columbia	San Diego Aviators 22, WASHINGTON KASTLES 18 * MS: Taylor Fritz (Aviators) 5, Denis Kudla (Kastles) 3 * WD: Darija Jurak/Chanelle Scheepers (Aviators) 5, Anastasia Rodionova/Madison Brengle (Kastles) 4 * MD: Leander Paes/Denis Kudla (Kastles) 5, Taylor Fritz/Raven Klaasen (Aviators) 2 * WS: Chanelle Scheepers (Aviators) 5, Madison Brengle (Kastles) 3 * XD: Darija Jurak/Raven Klaasen (Aviators) 5, Leander Paes/Anastasia Rodionova (Kastles) 3	2–2
5	July 17	The Pavilion; Radnor Township, Pennsylvania	Washington Kastles 21, PHILADELPHIA FREEDOMS 20 * XD: Taylor Townsend/Marcelo Melo (Freedoms) 5, Anastasia Rodionova/Leander Paes (Kastles) 2 * WS: Madison Brengle (Kastles) 5, Taylor Townsend (Freedoms) 3 * MD: Denis Kudla/Leander Paes (Kastles) 5, Robby Ginepri/Marcelo Melo (Freedoms) 3 * WD: Asia Muhammad/Taylor Townsend (Freedoms) 5, Madison Brengle/Anastasia Rodionova (Kastles) 4 * MS: Denis Kudla (Kastles) 5, Robby Ginepri (Freedoms) 4	3–2
6	July 18	Kastles Stadium at the Charles E. Smith Center; Washington, District of Columbia	WASHINGTON KASTLES 23, Philadelphia Freedoms 6 * XD: Marcelo Melo/Taylor Townsend (Freedoms) 5, Leander Paes/Anastasia Rodionova (Kastles) 3 * WD: Anastasia Rodionova/Madison Brengle (Kastles) 5, Taylor Townsend/Asia Muhammad (Freedoms) 1 * MD: Leander Paes/Denis Kudla (Kastles) 5, Marcelo Melo/Robby Ginepri (Freedoms) 0 * WS: Madison Brengle (Kastles) 5, Taylor Townsend (Freedoms) 0 * MS: Denis Kudla (Kastles) 5, Robby Ginepri (Freedoms) 0	4–2
7	July 20	The Pavilion; Radnor Township, Pennsylvania	PHILADELPHIA FREEDOMS 18, Washington Kastles 16 * MS: Sam Querrey (Kastles) 5, Robby Ginepri (Freedoms) 2 * WS: Taylor Townsend (Freedoms) 5, Madison Brengle (Kastles) 1 * MD: Robby Ginepri/Marcelo Melo (Freedoms) 5, Sam Querrey/Leander Paes (Kastles) 4 * WD: Madison Brengle/Anastasia Rodionova (Kastles) 5, Abigail Spears/Taylor Townsend (Freedoms) 1 * XD: Marcelo Melo/Taylor Townsend (Freedoms) 5, Leander Paes/Anastasia Rodionova (Kastles) 1	4–3
8	July 21	Kastles Stadium at the Charles E. Smith Center; Washington, District of Columbia	WASHINGTON KASTLES 25, Boston Lobsters 13 * XD: Anastasia Rodionova/Leander Paes (Kastles) 5, Maria Sanchez/Scott Lipsky (Lobsters) 2 * WD: Anastasia Rodionova/Madison Brengle (Kastles) 5, Irina Falconi/Maria Sanchez (Lobsters) 0 * MD: Leander Paes/Sam Querrey (Kastles) 5, Scott Lipsky/Tim Smyczek (Lobsters) 4 * WS: Madison Brengle (Kastles) 5, Irina Falconi (Lobsters) 3 * MS: Sam Querrey (Kastles) 5, Tim Smyczek (Lobsters) 4	5–3
9	July 23	Boston Lobsters Tennis Center at the Manchester Athletic Club; Manchester-by-the-Sea, Massachusetts	Washington Kastles 25, BOSTON LOBSTERS 14 * XD: Leander Paes/Martina Hingis (Kastles) 5, Scott Lipsky/Arantxa Parra Santonja (Lobsters) 2 * WD: Martina Hingis/Anastasia Rodionova (Kastles) 5, Arantxa Parra Santonja/Irina Falconi (Lobsters) 2 * MD: Leander Paes/Sam Querrey (Kastles) 5, Scott Lipsky/Tim Smyczek (Lobsters) 4 * WS: Martina Hingis (Kastles) 5, Irina Falconi (Lobsters) 3 * MS: Sam Querrey (Kastles) 5, Tim Smyczek (Lobsters) 3	6–3
10	July 24	Gregory Gymnasium; Austin, Texas	Washington Kastles 22, AUSTIN ACES 14 * XD: Martina Hingis/Leander Paes (Kastles) 5, Alla Kudryavtseva/Teymuraz Gabashvili (Aces) 3 * WD: Martina Hingis/Anastasia Rodionova (Kastles) 5, Nicole Gibbs/Alla Kudryavtseva (Aces) 1 * WS: Nicole Gibbs (Aces) 5, Anastasia Rodionova (Kastles) 2 * MD: Leander Paes/Sam Querrey (Kastles) 5, Teymuraz Gabashvili/Jarmere Jenkins (Aces) 2 * MS: Sam Querrey (Kastles) 5, Teymuraz Gabashvili (Aces) 3	7–3
11	July 26	Kastles Stadium at the Charles E. Smith Center; Washington, District of Columbia	WASHINGTON KASTLES 24, Springfield Lasers 16 (extended play) * XD: Leander Paes/Martina Hingis (Kastles) 5, Andre Begemann/Anna-Lena Grönefeld (Lasers) 4 * WS: Alison Riske (Lasers) 5, Martina Hingis (Kastles) 4 * MD: Leander Paes/Sam Querrey (Kastles) 5, Michael Russell/Andre Begemann (Lasers) 0 * WD: Martina Hingis/Anastasia Rodionova (Kastles) 5, Anna-Lena Grönefeld/Alison Riske (Lasers) 2 * MS: Michael Russell (Lasers) 5, Sam Querrey (Kastles) 4 * EP - MS: Sam Querrey (Kastles) 1, Michael Russell (Lasers) 0	8–3
12	July 27	Kastles Stadium at the Charles E. Smith Center; Washington, District of Columbia	WASHINGTON KASTLES 19, California Dream 17 * XD: Neal Skupski/Anabel Medina Garrigues (Dream) 5, Leander Paes/Martina Hingis (Kastles) 3 * WS: Jarmila Gajdošová (Dream) 5, Martina Hingis (Kastles) 1 * MD: Leander Paes/Sam Querrey (Kastles) 5, Neal Skupski/Tennys Sandgren (Dream) 4 * WD: Martina Hingis/Anastasia Rodionova (Kastles) 5, Anabel Medina Garrigues/Jarmila Gajdošová (Dream) 1 * MS: Sam Querrey (Kastles) 5, Tennys Sandgren (Dream) 2	9–3
13	July 28	Gregory Gymnasium; Austin, Texas	AUSTIN ACES 19, Washington Kastles 16 * MD: Leander Paes/Sam Querrey (Kastles) 5, Teymuraz Gabashvili/Jarmere Jenkins (Aces) 4 * WD: Anastasia Rodionova/Madison Brengle (Kastles) 5, Elina Svitolina/Alla Kudryavtseva (Aces) 3 * MS: Teymuraz Gabashvili (Aces) 5, Sam Querrey (Kastles) 0 * XD: Anastasia Rodionova/Leander Paes (Kastles) 5, Alla Kudryavtseva/Teymuraz Gabashvili (Aces) 2 * WS: Elina Svitolina (Aces) 5, Madison Brengle (Kastles) 1	9–4
14	July 29	Kastles Stadium at the Charles E. Smith Center; Washington, District of Columbia	WASHINGTON KASTLES 22, Boston Lobsters 14 * MD: Leander Paes/Sam Querrey (Kastles) 5, Scott Lipsky/Christian Harrison (Lobsters) 3 * WS: Martina Hingis (Kastles) 5, Irina Falconi (Lobsters) 1 * XD: Scott Lipsky/Arantxa Parra Santonja (Lobsters) 5, Leander Paes/Martina Hingis (Kastles) 3 * WD: Irina Falconi/Arantxa Parra Santonja (Lobsters) 5, Martina Hingis/Anastasia Rodionova (Kastles) 4 * MS: Sam Querrey (Kastles) 5, Christian Harrison (Lobsters) 0	10–4

=== Playoffs ===
Legend
Kastles Win	Kastles Loss
Home team in CAPS

Eastern Conference Championship Match

Date	Venue and location	Result and details
July 30	Kastles Stadium at the Charles E. Smith Center; Washington, District of Columbia	WASHINGTON KASTLES 25, Philadelphia Freedoms 9 * XD: Martina Hingis/Leander Paes (Kastles) 5, Taylor Townsend/Marcelo Melo (Freedoms) 1 * WS: Madison Brengle (Kastles) 5, Coco Vandeweghe (Freedoms) 2 * MD: Leander Paes/Sam Querrey (Kastles) 5, Robby Ginepri/Marcelo Melo (Freedoms) 2 * WD: Martina Hingis/Anastasia Rodionova (Kastles) 5, Taylor Townsend/Coco Vandeweghe (Freedoms) 4 * MS: Sam Querrey (Kastles) 5, Robby Ginepri (Freedoms) 0

World TeamTennis Championship Match

Date	Venue and location	Result and details
August 2	Kastles Stadium at the Charles E. Smith Center; Washington, District of Columbia	Washington Kastles 24, AUSTIN ACES (Note: Prior to the start of the season, WTT determined that the World TeamTennis Championship Match would be played on the home court of the Eastern Conference champion. The Aces, as the higher seed, were treated as the "home" team under WTT rules for determining order of play.) 18 (extended play) * XD: Martina Hingis/Leander Paes (Kastles) 5, Alla Kudryavtseva/Teymuraz Gabashvili (Aces) 2 * WD: Martina Hingis/Anastasia Rodionova (Kastles) 5, Elina Svitolina/Alla Kudryavtseva (Aces) 4 * MD: Leander Paes/Sam Querrey (Kastles) 5, Teymuraz Gabashvili/Jarmere Jenkins (Aces) 3 * MS: Sam Querrey (Kastles) 5, Teymuraz Gabashvili (Aces) 4 * WS: Elina Svitolina (Aces) 5, Madison Brengle (Kastles) 3 * EP - WS: Madison Brengle (Kastles) 1, Elina Svitolina (Aces) 0

== Team personnel ==
=== On-court personnel ===
- (United States) Murphy Jensen, Coach
- (United States) Madison Brengle
- (Switzerland) Martina Hingis
- (United States) Denis Kudla
- (India) Leander Paes
- (United States) Sam Querrey
- (United States) Rajeev Ram (Note: Player appeared in fewer than three matches during the season as a substitute player and was not eligible to be protected in the following year's draft.)
- (Australia) Anastasia Rodionova
- (United States) Serena Williams (injured, did not play) (Note: Player was not eligible to be protected in the following year's draft, because she was not on the team in 2014, and did not appear in a match in 2015.)
- (United States) Venus Williams

=== Front office ===
- Mark Ein, Owner
- Kevin Wynne, General Manager

== Statistics ==
Players are listed in order of their game-winning percentage provided they played in at least 40% of the Kastles' games in that event, which is the WTT minimum for qualification for league leaders in individual statistical categories.

Men's singles – regular season

Player	GP	GW	GL	PCT	A	DF	BPW	BPP	BP%	3APW	3APP	3AP%
Sam Querrey	59	35	24	.593	33	5	9	18	.500	5	11	.455
Denis Kudla	45	23	22	.511	14	7	3	14	.214	4	11	.364
Total	104	58	46	.558	47	12	12	32	.375	9	22	.409

Women's singles – regular season

Player	GP	GW	GL	PCT	A	DF	BPW	BPP	BP%	3APW	3APP	3AP%
Madison Brengle	57	30	27	.526	3	5	11	20	.550	7	16	.438
Venus Williams	8	5	3	.625	2	0	1	4	.250	1	2	.500
Martina Hingis	29	15	14	.517	2	5	5	8	.625	5	8	.625
Anastasia Rodionova	7	2	5	.286	0	0	0	0	-	0	1	.000
Total	101	52	49	.515	7	10	17	32	.531	13	27	.481

Men's doubles – regular season

Player	GP	GW	GL	PCT	A	DF	BPW	BPP	BP%	3APW	3APP	3AP%
Leander Paes	98	62	36	.633	1	6	16	39	.410	16	27	.593
Sam Querrey	65	39	26	.600	17	5	8	25	.320	10	17	.588
Denis Kudla	42	28	14	.667	2	1	9	15	.600	7	11	.636
Rajeev Ram	9	5	4	.556	0	0	1	1	1.000	1	1	1.000
Total	107	67	40	.626	20	12	17	40	.425	17	28	.607

Women's doubles – regular season

Player	GP	GW	GL	PCT	A	DF	BPW	BPP	BP%	3APW	3APP	3AP%
Anastasia Rodionova	97	59	38	.608	4	5	20	46	.435	14	24	.583
Madison Brengle	56	34	22	.607	3	1	11	25	.440	3	10	.300
Martina Hingis	35	24	11	.686	1	3	9	18	.500	11	12	.917
Venus Williams	6	1	5	.167	0	0	0	3	.000	0	2	.000
Total	97	59	38	.608	8	9	20	46	.435	14	24	.583

Mixed doubles – regular season

Player	GP	GW	GL	PCT	A	DF	BPW	BPP	BP%	3APW	3APP	3AP%
Anastasia Rodionova	60	29	31	.483	2	3	7	23	.304	10	20	.500
Leander Paes	100	48	52	.480	9	10	10	38	.263	11	27	.407
Rajeev Ram	8	5	3	.625	2	0	1	2	.500	1	1	1.000
Martina Hingis	40	21	19	.525	1	3	4	14	.286	1	5	.200
Venus Williams	8	3	5	.375	0	1	0	3	.000	1	3	.333
Total	108	53	55	.491	14	17	11	40	.275	12	28	.429

Team totals – regular season

Event	GP	GW	GL	PCT	A	DF	BPW	BPP	BP%	3APW	3APP	3AP%
Men's singles	104	58	46	.558	47	12	12	32	.375	9	22	.409
Women's singles	101	52	49	.515	7	10	17	32	.531	13	27	.481
Men's doubles	107	67	40	.626	20	12	17	40	.425	17	28	.607
Women's doubles	97	59	38	.608	8	9	20	46	.435	14	24	.583
Mixed doubles	108	53	55	.491	14	17	11	40	.275	12	28	.429
Total	517	289	228	.559	96	60	77	190	.405	65	129	.504

Men's singles – playoffs

Player	GP	GW	GL	PCT	A	DF	BPW	BPP	BP%	3APW	3APP	3AP%
Sam Querrey	14	10	4	.714	9	3	2	2	1.000	2	2	1.000
Total	14	10	4	.714	9	3	2	2	1.000	2	2	1.000

Women's singles – playoffs

Player	GP	GW	GL	PCT	A	DF	BPW	BPP	BP%	3APW	3APP	3AP%
Madison Brengle	16	9	7	.563	0	0	3	7	.429	4	6	.667
Total	16	9	7	.563	0	0	3	7	.429	4	6	.667

Men's doubles – playoffs

Player	GP	GW	GL	PCT	A	DF	BPW	BPP	BP%	3APW	3APP	3AP%
Leander Paes	15	10	5	.667	1	0	2	6	.333	2	4	.500
Sam Querrey	15	10	5	.667	2	0	2	6	.333	2	4	.500
Total	15	10	5	.667	3	0	2	6	.333	2	4	.500

Women's doubles – playoffs

Player	GP	GW	GL	PCT	A	DF	BPW	BPP	BP%	3APW	3APP	3AP%
Martina Hingis	18	10	8	.556	0	1	4	6	.667	1	5	.200
Anastasia Rodionova	18	10	8	.556	1	3	4	6	.667	1	5	.200
Total	18	10	8	.556	1	4	4	6	.667	1	5	.200

Mixed doubles – playoffs

Player	GP	GW	GL	PCT	A	DF	BPW	BPP	BP%	3APW	3APP	3AP%
Martina Hingis	13	10	3	.769	0	0	4	8	.500	2	2	1.000
Leander Paes	13	10	3	.769	0	1	4	8	.500	2	2	1.000
Total	13	10	3	.769	0	1	4	8	.500	2	2	1.000

Team totals – playoffs

Event	GP	GW	GL	PCT	A	DF	BPW	BPP	BP%	3APW	3APP	3AP%
Men's singles	14	10	4	.714	9	3	2	2	1.000	2	2	1.000
Women's singles	16	9	7	.563	0	0	3	7	.429	4	6	.667
Men's doubles	15	10	5	.667	3	0	2	6	.333	2	4	.500
Women's doubles	18	10	8	.556	1	4	4	6	.667	1	5	.200
Mixed doubles	13	10	3	.769	0	1	4	8	.500	2	2	1.000
Total	76	49	27	.645	13	8	15	29	.517	11	19	.579

Men's singles – all matches

Player	GP	GW	GL	PCT	A	DF	BPW	BPP	BP%	3APW	3APP	3AP%
Sam Querrey	73	45	28	.616	42	8	11	20	.550	7	13	.538
Denis Kudla	45	23	22	.511	14	7	3	14	.214	4	11	.364
Total	118	68	50	.576	56	15	14	34	.412	11	24	.458

Women's singles – all matches

Player	GP	GW	GL	PCT	A	DF	BPW	BPP	BP%	3APW	3APP	3AP%
Madison Brengle	73	39	34	.534	3	5	14	27	.519	11	22	.500
Venus Williams	8	5	3	.625	2	0	1	4	.250	1	2	.500
Martina Hingis	29	15	14	.517	2	5	5	8	.625	5	8	.625
Anastasia Rodionova	7	2	5	.286	0	0	0	0	-	0	1	.000
Total	117	61	56	.521	7	10	20	39	.513	17	33	.515

Men's doubles – all matches

Player	GP	GW	GL	PCT	A	DF	BPW	BPP	BP%	3APW	3APP	3AP%
Leander Paes	113	72	41	.637	2	6	18	45	.400	18	31	.581
Sam Querrey	80	49	31	.613	19	5	10	31	.323	12	21	.571
Denis Kudla	42	28	14	.667	2	1	9	15	.600	7	11	.636
Rajeev Ram	9	5	4	.556	0	0	1	1	1.000	1	1	1.000
Total	122	77	45	.631	23	12	19	46	.413	19	32	.594

Women's doubles – all matches

Player	GP	GW	GL	PCT	A	DF	BPW	BPP	BP%	3APW	3APP	3AP%
Martina Hingis	53	34	19	.642	1	4	13	24	.542	12	17	.706
Anastasia Rodionova	115	69	46	.600	5	8	24	52	.462	15	29	.517
Madison Brengle	56	34	22	.607	3	1	11	25	.440	3	10	.300
Venus Williams	6	1	5	.167	0	0	0	3	.000	0	2	.000
Total	115	69	46	.600	9	13	24	52	.462	15	29	.517

Mixed doubles – all matches

Player	GP	GW	GL	PCT	A	DF	BPW	BPP	BP%	3APW	3APP	3AP%
Martina Hingis	53	31	22	.585	1	3	8	22	.364	3	7	.429
Anastasia Rodionova	60	29	31	.483	2	3	7	23	.304	10	20	.500
Leander Paes	113	58	55	.513	9	11	14	46	.304	13	29	.448
Rajeev Ram	8	5	3	.625	2	0	1	2	.500	1	1	1.000
Venus Williams	8	3	5	.375	0	1	0	3	.000	1	3	.333
Total	121	63	58	.521	14	18	15	48	.313	14	30	.467

Team totals – all matches

Event	GP	GW	GL	PCT	A	DF	BPW	BPP	BP%	3APW	3APP	3AP%
Men's singles	118	68	50	.576	56	15	14	34	.412	11	24	.458
Women's singles	117	61	56	.521	7	10	20	39	.513	17	33	.515
Men's doubles	122	77	45	.631	23	12	19	46	.413	19	32	.594
Women's doubles	115	69	46	.600	9	13	24	52	.462	15	29	.517
Mixed doubles	121	63	58	.521	14	18	15	48	.313	14	30	.467
Total	593	338	255	.570	109	68	92	219	.420	76	148	.514

== Transactions ==
- July 27, 2014: Bobby Reynolds retired.
- March 16, 2015: The Kastles protected Martina Hingis, Venus Williams, Leander Paes and Anastasia Rodionova and drafted Serena Williams as a marquee player and Sam Querrey as a roster-exempt player at the WTT draft.
- March 31, 2015: The Kastles did not protect Kevin Anderson as a wildcard player effectively making him a free agent.
- May 6, 2015: The Kastles signed Madison Brengle as a substitute player.
- June 26, 2015: The Kastles signed Denis Kudla as a substitute player.
- July 10, 2015: The Kastles signed Rajeev Ram as a substitute player.

== Individual honors and achievements ==
The following table shows individual honors bestowed upon players of the Washington Kastles in 2015.

Player	Award
Anastasia Rodionova	Female Co-Most Valuable Player
Leander Paes	WTT Final Most Valuable Player

Anastasia Rodionova led WTT in winning percentage in women's doubles. Leander Paes led WTT in winning percentage in men's doubles Sam Querrey was second in WTT in winning percentage in both men's singles and men's doubles. Madison Brengle was second in WTT in winning percentage in both women's singles and women's doubles.

== See also ==
- Sports in Washington, D.C.
