= 2015 Philadelphia Freedoms season =

- Conference: 2nd Eastern

Record
- 2015 record: 5 wins, 9 losses
- Home record: 2 wins, 5 losses
- Road record: 3 wins, 4 losses
- Games won–lost: 260–267

Team info
- Owner(s): Billie Jean King
- General manager: Barbara Perry
- Coach: Josh Cohen
- Stadium: The Pavilion (capacity: 3,500)

The 2015 Philadelphia Freedoms season was the 15th season of the franchise (in its current incarnation) in World TeamTennis (WTT).

Led by the strong mixed doubles play of Taylor Townsend and Marcelo Melo, the Freedoms had only 5 wins against 9 losses but qualified for the playoffs for the second consecutive season. The Freedoms lost the Eastern Conference Championship Match, 25–9, to the Washington Kastles.

== Season recap ==
=== Draft ===
At the WTT draft on March 16, 2015, the Freedoms passed on making any selections in the marquee portion of the draft. In the roster portion of the draft, the Freedoms protected Taylor Townsend and 2014 WTT Male Most Valuable Player Marcelo Melo. They left Victoria Duval and Liezel Huber unprotected in the second round and instead chose Robby Ginepri. The Freedoms could not protect Frank Dancevic in the fourth round, because they already had two full-time male players. Huber was still available, and the Freedoms selected her to complete their roster.

=== Other player transactions ===
On June 29, 2015, the Freedoms announced that Liezel Huber would miss the 2015 season due to health concerns, and she was removed from the active roster. The Freedoms also announced that they had signed Coco Vandeweghe, Asia Muhammad and Abigail Spears as substitute players. Vandeweghe was scheduled to play in the team's first three matches (all on the road), followed by Muhammad playing in the next four and Spears playing in the final seven.

=== Second-half turnaround ===
After winning their opening match on the road, the Freedoms lost their next six consecutive matches and found themselves with 1 win and 6 losses at the midway point of the season with the four-time defending WTT champion Washington Kastles coming to town.

The July 20 home match against the Kastles got off to a difficult start when the Freedoms dropped the opening set of men's singles, 5–2. But Taylor Townsend responded by taking a 5–1 set win over Madison Brengle in women's singles to give the Freedoms a 7–6 lead. Robby Ginepri and Marcelo Melo won a tiebreaker over Sam Querrey and Leander Paes in men's doubles to increase the lead to 12–10. But the Kastles won the next set of women's doubles and took a 15–13 lead to the final set. Melo and Townsend dominated Paes and Anastasia Rodionova in the final set of mixed doubles, 5–1, to give the Freedoms an 18–16 victory.

After a night off, the Freedoms went on the road to face the Boston Lobsters looking to avenge an early-season home loss. The Lobsters took the opening set of mixed doubles in a tiebreaker. But the Freedoms responded by winning the final four sets on their way to a 24–14 victory. Townsend gave the Freedoms a 9–5 lead in the match when she took the women's singles set from Irina Falconi, 5–0. Townsend won 20 of the 26 points played in the set. Following two sets won by the Freedoms in tiebreakers, Melo and Ginepri closed out the match with a 5–1 men's doubles set win.

The Freedoms returned home the following evening to face the Austin Aces, who entered the match with 8 wins and 0 losses. The Freedoms stunned the Aces by winning the first four sets to take a 20–9 lead. Ginepri opened with a 5–2 set win in men's singles, and Townsend followed by taking the women's singles set, 5–3. Ginepri and Melo won the men's doubles, 5–3, and Townsend teamed with Abigail Spears for a 5–1 set win in women's doubles. The Aces salvaged the final set of mixed doubles, 5–1, to cut the Freedoms' lead to 21–14 and send the match to extended play. But Townsend and Melo won the first game of extra time to give the Freedoms their third consecutive victory by a score of 22–14.

The Freedoms followed their three-match winning streak with two straight losses. Yet, with 4 wins and 8 losses and two matches remaining, the Freedoms controlled their own playoff destiny. The Lobsters were in second place in the Eastern Conference with 4 wins and 7 losses, and the Freedoms had a home-and-home series scheduled with them to close the season. Following the home-and-home, the Lobsters were scheduled to close their season on the road against the Kastles. Therefore, if the Freedoms could sweep the home-and-home series, they would clinch a playoff berth.

The Lobsters hosted the first match, and Ginepri put the Freedoms in front early with a 5–2 set win in men's singles. The Lobsters took the women's singles by the same score to tie the match at 7. Ginepri and Melo followed by winning the men's doubles set, 5–3, to give the Freedoms a 12–10 lead. But the Lobsters won the women's doubles set by the same score to tie the match at 15, heading to the final set. Melo and Townsend converted two of three break point opportunities while thwarting all five break point opportunities they gave the Lobsters and won the set, 5–2, for a 20–17 victory.

Returning home with a chance to clinch a playoff berth in their final regular-season match, the Freedoms got off to a quick start when Ginepri won the opening set of men's singles, 5–0. But the Lobsters charged back, winning the next three sets to take a 15–12 lead to the final set. Melo and Townsend controlled the early portion of the fifth set of mixed doubles with two breaks of serve on two opportunities, and it looked as though the Freedoms might win the match outright with a lopsided final set win. But the Lobsters broke back late, and the Freedoms won the set by a score of 5–3 to cut the Lobsters' lead in the match to 18–17 and set up extended play. Melo served the first game of extended play, and the Freedoms quickly fell behind in the game, 3–1. The Freedoms successfully defended the first two break points, but the Lobsters ultimately broke at 3 all to win the match, 19–17. The Freedoms would have to wait for the result of the Lobsters' final match to learn their fate.

With an opportunity to grab a playoff spot, the Lobsters fell to the Kastles, 22–14, in their final regular-season match, clinching a playoff berth for the Freedoms. Since the Freedoms and Lobsters finished the regular season with identical 5–9 records, the WTT standings tiebreaker system was used to break the tie. The teams split their four regular-season meetings. So, the tie was broken by comparing games won in head-to-head matches, which favored the Freedoms, 78–71. The biggest contribution to this margin was made by the Freedoms' 24–14 road victory over the Lobsters on July 22.

=== Playoffs ===
The Freedoms visited the Washington Kastles to play the Eastern Conference Championship Match on July 30, 2015. It was a dominant performance for Washington, as the Kastles took all five sets en route to a 25–9 victory for their fifth consecutive Eastern Conference title. Martina Hingis teamed with Leander Paes in the opening set of mixed doubles for a 5–1 set win over Taylor Townsend and Marcelo Melo. Townsend and Coco Vandeweghe were able to push Hingis and Anastasia Rodionova to a tiebreaker in the fourth set of women's doubles before dropping the set. Madison Brengle saved three break points and won both 3-all points for a 5–2 set win in women's singles over Vandeweghe. Paes and Sam Querrey took the men's doubles set, 5–2, over Melo and Robby Ginepri. Querrey closed out the match with a 5–0 whitewash of Ginepri in men's singles.

== Event chronology ==
- March 16, 2015: The Freedoms protected Taylor Townsend and Marcelo Melo, chose Robby Ginepri as a new addition to the team and selected returning team member Liezel Huber whom they had left unprotected at the WTT draft.
- June 29, 2015: The Freedoms announced Liezel Huber would miss the 2015 season due to health concerns and removed her from the active roster. The Freedoms signed Coco Vandeweghe, Asia Muhammad and Abigail Spears as substitute players.
- July 29, 2015: With a record of 5 wins and 9 losses, the Freedoms clinched a playoff berth when the Washington Kastles defeated the Boston Lobsters, 22–14.
- July 30, 2015: The Freedoms lost the Eastern Conference Championship Match, 25–9, to the Washington Kastles.

== Draft picks ==
Since the Freedoms had the worse record of the two conference championship losers in 2014, they selected fourth from the bottom (fourth) in each round of the draft. Unlike previous seasons in which WTT conducted its Marquee Player Draft and its Roster Player Draft on different dates about one month apart, the league conducted a single draft at the Indian Wells Tennis Garden in Indian Wells, California on March 16, 2015. The selections made by the Freedoms are shown in the table below.

Draft type	Round	No.	Overall	Player chosen	Prot?
Marquee	1	4	4	Pass	–
Marquee	2	4	11	Pass	–
Marquee	3	4	18	Pass	–
Roster	1	4	4	(United States) Taylor Townsend	Y
Roster	2	4	11	(United States) Robby Ginepri	N
Roster	3	4	18	(Brazil) Marcelo Melo	Y
Roster	4	4	25	(United States) Liezel Huber	N

== Match log ==
=== Regular season ===
Legend
Freedoms Win	Freedoms Loss
Home team in CAPS

Match	Date	Venue and location	Result and details	Record
1	July 12	Mediacom Stadium at Cooper Tennis Complex; Springfield, Missouri	Philadelphia Freedoms 22, SPRINGFIELD LASERS 15 * XD: Andre Begemann/Anna-Lena Grönefeld (Lasers) 5, Marcelo Melo/Coco Vandeweghe (Freedoms) 2 * WD: Coco Vandeweghe/Taylor Townsend (Freedoms) 5, Anna-Lena Grönefeld/Varvara Lepchenko (Lasers) 4 * MD: Robby Ginepri/Marcelo Melo (Freedoms) 5, Andre Begemann/Michael Russell (Lasers) 4 * WS: Coco Vandeweghe (Freedoms) 5, Varvara Lepchenko (Lasers) 1 * MS: Robby Ginepri (Freedoms) 5, Michael Russell (Lasers) 1	1–0
2	July 13	Omni La Costa Resort and Spa; Carlsbad, California	SAN DIEGO AVIATORS 22, Philadelphia Freedoms 21, (super tiebreaker, 7–5) * MD: Taylor Fritz/Raven Klaasen (Aviators) 5, Marcelo Melo/Robby Ginepri (Freedoms) 2 * WS: Coco Vandeweghe (Freedoms) 5, Chanelle Scheepers (Aviators) 4 * MS: Robby Ginepri (Freedoms) 5, Taylor Fritz (Aviators) 4 * WD: Coco Vandeweghe/Taylor Townsend (Freedoms) 5, Darija Jurak/Chanelle Scheepers (Aviators) 3 * XD: Raven Klaasen/Darija Jurak (Aviators) 5, Marcelo Melo/Coco Vandeweghe (Freedoms) 4 * STB - XD: Raven Klaasen/Darija Jurak (Aviators) 7, Marcelo Melo/Coco Vandeweghe (Freedoms) 5	1–1
3	July 14	Dream Stadium at Sunrise Mall; Citrus Heights, California	CALIFORNIA DREAM 22, Philadelphia Freedoms 20 * MD: Marcelo Melo/Robby Ginepri (Freedoms) 5, Tennys Sandgren/Neal Skupski (Dream) 4 * WD: Jarmila Gajdošová/Anabel Medina Garrigues (Dream) 5, Coco Vandeweghe/Taylor Townsend (Freedoms) 4 * XD: Neal Skupski/Anabel Medina Garrigues (Dream) 5, Marcelo Melo/Coco Vandeweghe (Freedoms) 3 * WS: Coco Vandeweghe (Freedoms) 5, Jarmila Gajdošová (Dream) 3 * MS: Tennys Sandgren (Dream) 5, Robby Ginepri (Freedoms) 3	1–2
4	July 16	The Pavilion; Radnor Township, Pennsylvania	Boston Lobsters 21, PHILADELPHIA FREEDOMS 17 * MS: Robby Ginepri (Freedoms) 5, Alex Kuznetsov (Lobsters) 2 * WD: Arantxa Parra Santonja/Irina Falconi (Lobsters) 5, Asia Muhammad/Taylor Townsend (Freedoms) 2 * XD: Marcelo Melo/Taylor Townsend (Freedoms) 5, Scott Lipsky/Irina Falconi (Lobsters) 4 *** Irina Falconi substituted for Arantxa Parra Santonja at 3–2 * WS: Irina Falconi (Lobsters) 5, Taylor Townsend (Freedoms) 2 * MD: Scott Lipsky/Alex Kuznetsov (Lobsters) 5, Marcelo Melo/Robby Ginepri (Freedoms) 3	1–3
5	July 17	The Pavilion; Radnor Township, Pennsylvania	Washington Kastles 21, PHILADELPHIA FREEDOMS 20 * XD: Taylor Townsend/Marcelo Melo (Freedoms) 5, Anastasia Rodionova/Leander Paes (Kastles) 2 * WS: Madison Brengle (Kastles) 5, Taylor Townsend (Freedoms) 3 * MD: Denis Kudla/Leander Paes (Kastles) 5, Robby Ginepri/Marcelo Melo (Freedoms) 3 * WD: Asia Muhammad/Taylor Townsend (Freedoms) 5, Madison Brengle/Anastasia Rodionova (Kastles) 4 * MS: Denis Kudla (Kastles) 5, Robby Ginepri (Freedoms) 4	1–4
6	July 18	Kastles Stadium at the Charles E. Smith Center; Washington, District of Columbia	WASHINGTON KASTLES 23, Philadelphia Freedoms 6 * XD: Marcelo Melo/Taylor Townsend (Freedoms) 5, Leander Paes/Anastasia Rodionova (Kastles) 3 * WD: Anastasia Rodionova/Madison Brengle (Kastles) 5, Taylor Townsend/Asia Muhammad (Freedoms) 1 * MD: Leander Paes/Denis Kudla (Kastles) 5, Marcelo Melo/Robby Ginepri (Freedoms) 0 * WS: Madison Brengle (Kastles) 5, Taylor Townsend (Freedoms) 0 * MS: Denis Kudla (Kastles) 5, Robby Ginepri (Freedoms) 0	1–5
7	July 19	The Pavilion; Radnor Township, Pennsylvania	Springfield Lasers 20, PHILADELPHIA FREEDOMS 19 * XD: Marcelo Melo/Taylor Townsend (Freedoms) 5, Andre Begemann/Anna-Lena Grönefeld (Lasers) 2 * WS: Taylor Townsend (Freedoms) 5, Sachia Vickery (Lasers) 4 * MD: Andre Begemann/Michael Russell (Lasers) 5, Marcelo Melo/Robby Ginepri (Freedoms) 3 * WD: Taylor Townsend/Asia Muhammad (Freedoms) 5, Anna-Lena Grönefeld/Sachia Vickery (Lasers) 4 * MS: Michael Russell (Lasers) 5, Robby Ginepri (Freedoms) 1	1–6
8	July 20	The Pavilion; Radnor Township, Pennsylvania	PHILADELPHIA FREEDOMS 18, Washington Kastles 16 * MS: Sam Querrey (Kastles) 5, Robby Ginepri (Freedoms) 2 * WS: Taylor Townsend (Freedoms) 5, Madison Brengle (Kastles) 1 * MD: Robby Ginepri/Marcelo Melo (Freedoms) 5, Sam Querrey/Leander Paes (Kastles) 4 * WD: Madison Brengle/Anastasia Rodionova (Kastles) 5, Abigail Spears/Taylor Townsend (Freedoms) 1 * XD: Marcelo Melo/Taylor Townsend (Freedoms) 5, Leander Paes/Anastasia Rodionova (Kastles) 1	2–6
9	July 22	Boston Lobsters Tennis Center at the Manchester Athletic Club; Manchester-by-the-Sea, Massachusetts	Philadelphia Freedoms 24, BOSTON LOBSTERS 14 * XD: Scott Lipsky/Arantxa Parra Santonja (Lobsters) 5, Marcelo Melo/Taylor Townsend (Freedoms) 4 * WS: Taylor Townsend (Freedoms) 5, Irina Falconi (Lobsters) 0 * MS: Robby Ginepri (Freedoms) 5, Tim Smyczek (Lobsters) 4 * WD: Taylor Townsend/Abigail Spears (Freedoms) 5, Irina Falconi/Arantxa Parra Santonja (Lobsters) 4 * MD: Marcelo Melo/Robby Ginepri (Freedoms) 5, Scott Lipsky/Tim Smyczek (Lobsters) 1	3–6
10	July 23	The Pavilion; Radnor Township, Pennsylvania	PHILADELPHIA FREEDOMS 22, Austin Aces 14 (extended play) * MS: Robby Ginepri (Freedoms) 5, Teymuraz Gabashvili (Aces) 2 * WS: Taylor Townsend (Freedoms) 5, Nicole Gibbs (Aces) 3 * MD: Robby Ginepri/Marcelo Melo (Freedoms) 5, Teymuraz Gabashvili/Jarmere Jenkins (Aces) 3 * WD: Abigail Spears/Taylor Townsend (Freedoms) 5, Nicole Gibbs/Alla Kudryavtseva (Aces) 1 * XD: Alla Kudryavtseva/Jarmere Jenkins (Aces) 5, Taylor Townsend/Marcelo Melo (Freedoms) 1 * EP - XD: Taylor Townsend/Marcelo Melo (Freedoms) 1, Alla Kudryavtseva/Jarmere Jenkins (Aces) 0	4–6
11	July 24	Mediacom Stadium at Cooper Tennis Complex; Springfield, Missouri	SPRINGFIELD LASERS 21, Philadelphia Freedoms 18 * XD: Marcelo Melo/Taylor Townsend (Freedoms) 5, Andre Begemann/Anna-Lena Grönefeld (Lasers) 4 * WS: Alison Riske (Lasers) 5, Taylor Townsend (Freedoms) 4 * MD: John Isner/Andre Begemann (Lasers) 5, Marcelo Melo/Robby Ginepri (Freedoms) 2 * WD: Abigail Spears/Taylor Townsend (Freedoms) 5, Alison Riske/Anna-Lena Grönefeld (Lasers) 2 * MS: John Isner (Lasers) 5, Robby Ginepri (Freedoms) 2	4–7
12	July 26	The Pavilion; Radnor Township, Pennsylvania	California Dream 22, PHILADELPHIA FREEDOMS 16 * MS: Tennys Sandgren (Dream) 5, Robby Ginepri (Freedoms) 4 * WS: Taylor Townsend (Freedoms) 5, Jarmila Gajdošová (Dream) 2 * MD: Bob Bryan/Mike Bryan (Dream) 5, Robby Ginepri/Marcelo Melo (Freedoms) 1 * WD: Jarmila Gajdošová/Anabel Medina Garrigues (Dream) 5, Abigail Spears/Taylor Townsend (Freedoms) 4 * XD: Anabel Medina Garrigues/Bob Bryan (Dream) 5, Taylor Townsend/Marcelo Melo (Freedoms) 2	4–8
13	July 27	Boston Lobsters Tennis Center at the Manchester Athletic Club; Manchester-by-the-Sea, Massachusetts	Philadelphia Freedoms 20, BOSTON LOBSTERS 17 * MS: Robby Ginepri (Freedoms) 5, Jan-Michael Gambill (Lobsters) 2 * WS: Irina Falconi (Lobsters) 5, Coco Vandeweghe (Freedoms) 2 * MD: Robby Ginepri/Marcelo Melo (Freedoms) 5, Jan-Michael Gambill/Scott Lipsky (Lobsters) 3 * WD: Arantxa Parra Santonja/Irina Falconi (Lobsters) 5, Coco Vandeweghe/Taylor Townsend (Freedoms) 3 * XD: Taylor Townsend/Marcelo Melo (Freedoms) 5, Arantxa Parra Santonja/Scott Lipsky (Lobsters) 2	5–8
14	July 28	The Pavilion; Radnor Township, Pennsylvania	Boston Lobsters 19, PHILADELPHIA FREEDOMS 17 (extended play) * MS: Robby Ginepri (Freedoms) 5, Christian Harrison (Lobsters) 0 * WD: Irina Falconi/Arantxa Parra Santonja (Lobsters) 5, Taylor Townsend/Coco Vandeweghe (Freedoms) 2 * MD: Christian Harrison/Scott Lipsky (Lobsters) 5, Robby Ginepri/Marcelo Melo (Freedoms) 4 * WS: Irina Falconi (Lobsters) 5, Taylor Townsend (Freedoms) 1 *** Taylor Townsend substituted for Coco Vandeweghe at 1–3 * XD: Taylor Townsend/Marcelo Melo (Freedoms) 5, Arantxa Parra Santonja/Scott Lipsky (Lobsters) 3 * EP - XD: Arantxa Parra Santonja/Scott Lipsky (Lobsters) 1, Taylor Townsend/Marcelo Melo (Freedoms) 0	5–9

=== Playoffs ===
Legend
Freedoms Win	Freedoms Loss
Home team in CAPS

Eastern Conference Championship Match

Date	Venue and location	Result and details
July 30	Kastles Stadium at the Charles E. Smith Center; Washington, District of Columbia	WASHINGTON KASTLES 25, Philadelphia Freedoms 9 * XD: Martina Hingis/Leander Paes (Kastles) 5, Taylor Townsend/Marcelo Melo (Freedoms) 1 * WS: Madison Brengle (Kastles) 5, Coco Vandeweghe (Freedoms) 2 * MD: Leander Paes/Sam Querrey (Kastles) 5, Robby Ginepri/Marcelo Melo (Freedoms) 2 * WD: Martina Hingis/Anastasia Rodionova (Kastles) 5, Taylor Townsend/Coco Vandeweghe (Freedoms) 4 * MS: Sam Querrey (Kastles) 5, Robby Ginepri (Freedoms) 0

== Team personnel ==
=== On-court personnel ===
- (United States) Josh Cohen – Head Coach
- (United States) Robby Ginepri
- (United States) Liezel Huber (injured, did not play) (Note: Roster player who appeared in fewer than three matches due to injury and was eligible to be protected in the draft the following year because of WTT's injury exception.)
- (Brazil) Marcelo Melo
- (United States) Asia Muhammad
- (United States) Abigail Spears
- (United States) Taylor Townsend
- (United States) Coco Vandeweghe

=== Front office ===
- Billie Jean King – Owner
- Barbara Perry – General Manager
- Lisa Raymond – Player Personnel Director

== Statistics ==
Players are listed in order of their game-winning percentage provided they played in at least 40% of the Freedoms' games in that event, which is the WTT minimum for qualification for league leaders in individual statistical categories.

Men's singles – regular season

Player	GP	GW	GL	PCT	A	DF	BPW	BPP	BP%	3APW	3APP	3AP%
Robby Ginepri	101	51	50	.505	11	6	11	26	.423	13	22	.591
Total	101	51	50	.505	11	6	11	26	.423	13	22	.591

Women's singles – regular season

Player	GP	GW	GL	PCT	A	DF	BPW	BPP	BP%	3APW	3APP	3AP%
Taylor Townsend	66	34	32	.515	9	13	12	27	.444	10	18	.556
Coco Vandeweghe	34	18	16	.529	8	5	7	27	.259	3	12	.250
Total	100	52	48	.520	17	18	19	54	.352	13	30	.433

Men's doubles – regular season

Player	GP	GW	GL	PCT	A	DF	BPW	BPP	BP%	3APW	3APP	3AP%
Robby Ginepri	107	48	59	.449	2	6	10	43	.233	13	27	.481
Marcelo Melo	107	48	59	.449	7	6	10	43	.233	13	27	.481
Total	107	48	59	.449	9	12	10	43	.233	13	27	.481

Women's doubles – regular season

Player	GP	GW	GL	PCT	A	DF	BPW	BPP	BP%	3APW	3APP	3AP%
Taylor Townsend	109	52	57	.477	9	9	13	30	.433	12	27	.444
Abigail Spears	37	20	17	.541	6	4	4	8	.500	3	7	.429
Coco Vandeweghe	41	19	22	.463	3	8	6	16	.375	2	9	.222
Asia Muhammad	31	13	18	.419	0	1	3	6	.500	7	11	.636
Total	109	52	57	.477	18	22	13	30	.433	12	27	.444

Mixed doubles – regular season

Player	GP	GW	GL	PCT	A	DF	BPW	BPP	BP%	3APW	3APP	3AP%
Taylor Townsend	85	48	37	.565	3	8	12	28	.429	10	22	.455
Marcelo Melo	110	57	53	.518	14	1	12	41	.293	11	30	.367
Coco Vandeweghe	25	9	16	.360	2	1	0	13	.000	1	8	.125
Total	110	57	53	.518	19	10	12	41	.293	11	30	.367

Team totals – regular season

Event	GP	GW	GL	PCT	A	DF	BPW	BPP	BP%	3APW	3APP	3AP%
Men's singles	101	51	50	.505	11	6	11	26	.423	13	22	.591
Women's singles	100	52	48	.520	17	18	19	54	.352	13	30	.433
Men's doubles	107	48	59	.449	9	12	10	43	.233	13	27	.481
Women's doubles	109	52	57	.477	18	22	13	30	.433	12	27	.444
Mixed doubles	110	57	53	.518	19	10	12	41	.293	11	30	.367
Total	527	260	267	.493	74	68	65	194	.335	62	136	.456

Men's singles – playoffs

Player	GP	GW	GL	PCT	A	DF	BPW	BPP	BP%	3APW	3APP	3AP%
Robby Ginepri	5	0	5	.000	0	0	0	1	.000	0	2	.000
Total	5	0	5	.000	0	0	0	1	.000	0	2	.000

Women's singles – playoffs

Player	GP	GW	GL	PCT	A	DF	BPW	BPP	BP%	3APW	3APP	3AP%
Coco Vandeweghe	7	2	5	.286	0	0	0	3	.000	0	2	.000
Total	7	2	5	.286	0	0	0	3	.000	0	2	.000

Men's doubles – playoffs

Player	GP	GW	GL	PCT	A	DF	BPW	BPP	BP%	3APW	3APP	3AP%
Robby Ginepri	7	2	5	.286	0	0	0	0	-	2	2	1.000
Marcelo Melo	7	2	5	.286	0	0	0	0	-	2	2	1.000
Total	7	2	5	.286	0	0	0	0	-	2	2	1.000

Women's doubles – playoffs

Player	GP	GW	GL	PCT	A	DF	BPW	BPP	BP%	3APW	3APP	3AP%
Taylor Townsend	9	4	5	.444	0	0	1	1	1.000	1	1	1.000
Coco Vandeweghe	9	4	5	.444	0	2	1	1	1.000	1	1	1.000
Total	9	4	5	.444	0	2	1	1	1.000	1	1	1.000

Mixed doubles – playoffs

Player	GP	GW	GL	PCT	A	DF	BPW	BPP	BP%	3APW	3APP	3AP%
Marcelo Melo	6	1	5	.167	0	0	0	1	.000	0	1	.000
Taylor Townsend	6	1	5	.167	0	1	0	1	.000	0	1	.000
Total	6	1	5	.167	0	1	0	1	.000	0	1	.000

Team totals – playoffs

Event	GP	GW	GL	PCT	A	DF	BPW	BPP	BP%	3APW	3APP	3AP%
Men's singles	5	0	5	.000	0	0	0	1	.000	0	2	.000
Women's singles	7	2	5	.286	0	0	0	3	.000	0	2	.000
Men's doubles	7	2	5	.286	0	0	0	0	-	2	2	1.000
Women's doubles	9	4	5	.444	0	2	1	1	1.000	1	1	1.000
Mixed doubles	6	1	5	.167	0	1	0	1	.000	0	1	.000
Total	34	9	25	.265	0	3	1	6	.167	3	8	.375

Men's singles – all matches

Player	GP	GW	GL	PCT	A	DF	BPW	BPP	BP%	3APW	3APP	3AP%
Robby Ginepri	106	51	55	.481	11	6	11	27	.407	13	24	.542
Total	106	51	55	.481	11	6	11	27	.407	13	24	.542

Women's singles – all matches

Player	GP	GW	GL	PCT	A	DF	BPW	BPP	BP%	3APW	3APP	3AP%
Taylor Townsend	66	34	32	.515	9	13	12	27	.444	10	18	.556
Coco Vandeweghe	41	20	21	.488	8	5	7	30	.233	3	14	.214
Total	107	54	53	.505	17	18	19	57	.333	13	32	.406

Men's doubles – all matches

Player	GP	GW	GL	PCT	A	DF	BPW	BPP	BP%	3APW	3APP	3AP%
Robby Ginepri	114	50	64	.439	2	6	10	43	.233	15	29	.517
Marcelo Melo	114	50	64	.439	7	6	10	43	.233	15	29	.517
Total	114	50	64	.439	9	12	10	43	.233	15	29	.517

Women's doubles – all matches

Player	GP	GW	GL	PCT	A	DF	BPW	BPP	BP%	3APW	3APP	3AP%
Taylor Townsend	118	56	62	.475	9	9	14	31	.452	13	28	.464
Abigail Spears	37	20	17	.541	6	4	4	8	.500	3	7	.429
Coco Vandeweghe	50	23	27	.460	3	10	7	17	.412	3	10	.300
Asia Muhammad	31	13	18	.419	0	1	3	6	.500	7	11	.636
Total	118	56	62	.475	18	24	14	31	.452	13	28	.464

Mixed doubles – all matches

Player	GP	GW	GL	PCT	A	DF	BPW	BPP	BP%	3APW	3APP	3AP%
Taylor Townsend	91	49	42	.539	3	9	12	29	.414	10	23	.435
Marcelo Melo	116	58	58	.500	14	1	12	42	.286	11	31	.355
Coco Vandeweghe	25	9	16	.360	2	1	0	13	.000	1	8	.125
Total	116	58	58	.500	19	11	12	42	.286	11	31	.355

Team totals – all matches

Event	GP	GW	GL	PCT	A	DF	BPW	BPP	BP%	3APW	3APP	3AP%
Men's singles	106	51	55	.481	11	6	11	27	.407	13	24	.542
Women's singles	107	54	53	.505	17	18	19	57	.333	13	32	.406
Men's doubles	114	50	64	.439	9	12	10	43	.233	15	29	.517
Women's doubles	118	56	62	.475	18	24	14	31	.452	13	28	.464
Mixed doubles	116	58	58	.500	19	11	12	42	.286	11	31	.355
Total	561	269	292	.480	74	71	66	200	.330	65	144	.451

== Transactions ==
- March 16, 2015: The Freedoms protected Taylor Townsend and Marcelo Melo, chose Robby Ginepri as a new addition to the team and selected returning team member Liezel Huber whom they had left unprotected at the WTT draft.
- March 16, 2015: The Freedoms left Victoria Azarenka, Frank Dancevic and Victoria Duval unprotected in the WTT Draft effectively making them free agents.
- June 29, 2015: The Freedoms announced Liezel Huber would miss the 2015 season due to health concerns and removed her from the active roster. The Freedoms signed Coco Vandeweghe, Asia Muhammad and Abigail Spears as substitute players.

== Individual achievements ==
Taylor Townsend was fourth in WTT in winning percentage in mixed doubles. Marcelo Melo was sixth in WTT in winning percentage in mixed doubles.
