= 2015 San Diego Aviators season =

- Conference: 3rd Western

Record
- 2015 record: 5 wins, 9 losses
- Home record: 3 wins, 4 losses
- Road record: 2 wins, 5 losses
- Games won–lost: 249–297

Team info
- Owner(s): Fred Luddy (majority); Billy Berger (minority); Jack McGrory (minority)
- President/CEO: Billy Berger
- Coach: John Lloyd
- Stadium: Omni La Costa Resort & Spa

The 2015 San Diego Aviators season was the 21st season of the franchise in World TeamTennis (WTT) and its second playing in San Diego County, California.

After a successful inaugural season in San Diego in which the team had the best regular-season record in WTT, the Aviators had 5 wins and 9 losses, finished third in the Western Conference and failed to qualify for the playoffs.

== Season recap ==
=== New ownership ===
On December 18, 2014, the Aviators announced that Fred Luddy and Jack McGrory, formerly minority owners, had acquired control of the team from Russell Geyser. According to the team's website as of January 2015, Luddy became the majority owner, Geyser retained a minority stake, and team CEO Billy Berger acquired a minority interest in the team. Shelly Hall, who was the onetime general manager of the San Diego Friars and served in that position for the Aviators in 2014, was no longer listed as part of the team's staff. As of March 2015, Geyser was no longer listed on the team's website as one of the team's minority owners.

=== Move to Carlsbad ===
On December 29, 2014, the Aviators announced that the team would move its home matches to Omni La Costa Resort & Spa in nearby Carlsbad for the 2015 season.

=== New logo ===
On January 6, 2015, the Aviators unveiled their new logo on their Facebook page. In a significant change from the multicolored logo used in 2014, the new logo contains only thunderbird red and white.

=== Lloyd hired as coach ===
On March 3, 2015, the Aviators announced that John Lloyd had been hired as the team's new head coach to replace 2014 WTT Coach of the Year David Macpherson, who had expressed a desire to coach in the Sacramento metropolitan area with the newly-relocated California Dream. When Macpherson was later introduced as the Dream's new head coach, he said, "I’m very excited to be coaching in the city where I started my WTT career back in 1992."

=== Trade of Bryan brothers and draft ===
Since David Macpherson had long served as the coach for the Bryan brothers, it was inevitable that the twins would want to follow him just as they did when he was hired as the Aviators' head coach in 2014. Consequently, prior to the WTT draft on March 16, 2015, the Aviators traded Bob and Mike Bryan to the Dream for financial consideration. The Aviators did not protect 2014 WTT Female Most Valuable Player Daniela Hantuchová in the marquee portion of the draft. Madison Keys was assigned to the Aviators as a league-designated player, and they selected her as their only marquee draft pick. In the roster portion of the draft, the Aviators protected Raven Klaasen and Květa Peschke. They did not protect 2014 WTT Male Rookie of the Year Somdev Devvarman. The Aviators selected amateur Taylor Fritz and Chanelle Scheepers in the roster portion of the draft. Fritz was the only amateur player selected in the 2015 WTT draft.

=== Other player transactions ===
On June 26, 2015, the Aviators began listing Darija Jurak as a member of the team, and Květa Peschke was removed from the active roster. In posts on both Facebook and Twitter, Jurak was referred to as a member of the team. The Facebook post included a photograph of Jurak. The roster on the team's website no longer listed Peschke. Initially, no explanation was given by the Aviators for Peschke's departure from the team. The final reference to Peschke as a member of the Aviators was in a tweet on June 3, 2015, in which a photograph of her was included in a collage of pictures of the team. Although an image of Peschke appeared in a tweet by the Aviators on June 3, team rosters released by WTT to the press on the previous day, listed Jurak and not Peschke as a member of the Aviators. In a Facebook comment on July 6, 2015, the Aviators disclosed that Peschke was injured and unable to play for the team during the 2015 season. Peschke is the final player still with the team who also played for the New York Sportimes prior to the franchise's move to San Diego. Pursuant to WTT Rule 308F, Peschke may be protected by the Aviators in the 2016 WTT Draft, since she was eligible for protection in 2015, and she was injured before the 2015 season and unable to play.

On July 29, 2015, the Aviators added Daniel Nguyen to their roster as a substitute player.

=== Blake coaches opening match ===
On June 29, 2015, the Aviators announced that James Blake would coach the team in its season-opening match on July 12, at home against the California Dream. Following that match, John Lloyd served as the Aviators coach for the remainder of the season.

In the days leading up to the season opener, the Aviators hinted in social media posts that there was a surprise in store. Just hours before the opening match, the Aviators announced that Blake would not only coach the team, but he would also play.

In what was the inaugural match for the Dream after the franchise's move from Texas and the first match for the Aviators on their new home court, San Diego prevailed with a 24–19 victory. Chanelle Scheepers opened the match by taking the women's singles and closed it by teaming with Darija Jurak for a set win in women's doubles. Blake failed to win the men's singles set (the only set the Aviators dropped), but he came back paired with Raven Klaasen for a solid win in men's doubles. Klaasen and Jurak took the mixed doubles.

=== Aviators miss the playoffs ===
The Aviators started the season strong, winning three of their first four matches. However, they followed this with a five-match losing streak that was capped off by losses on consecutive evenings in a home-and-home series with the California Dream with whom they were contending for a playoff berth. In the second loss to the Dream, the Aviators took an 18–15 lead into the final set. But former Aviators Bob and Mike Bryan teamed up to take the final set of men's doubles, 5–1, for a 20–19 Dream victory. The loss dropped the Aviators' record to 3 wins and 6 losses.

The Aviators ended their losing streak with their finest performance of the season. They swept all five sets on the road against the Springfield Lasers, the team that had beaten them in the previous season's Western Conference Championship Match. Amateur Taylor Fritz closed out the match with a 5–4 men's singles set win over John Isner after earlier teaming with Raven Klaasen for a 5–4 me's doubles set win over Isner and Andre Begemann. Klaasen and Darija Jurak got the Aviators started with a 5–4 mixed doubles set win. Chanelle Scheepers took the second set, 5–3, and teamed with Jurak in the fourth set of women's doubles for another 5–3 set win.

The following evening, the Aviators were dominated by the Austin Aces, 25–8. They were shut out in both the women's singles and women's doubles sets. A bit more than two hours later, the Aviators were eliminated from playoff contention when the Dream completed its victory over the Philadelphia Freedoms.

== Event chronology ==
- March 3, 2015: The Aviators hired John Lloyd as their head coach replacing David Macpherson who was later hired by the California Dream.
- March 16, 2015: The Aviators traded Bob and Mike Bryan to the California Dream for financial consideration.
- March 16, 2015: The Aviators protected Raven Klaasen and Květa Peschke and selected Madison Keys, Taylor Fritz and Chanelle Scheepers at the WTT draft.
- June 2, 2015: The Aviators signed Darija Jurak, and Květa Peschke was removed from the active roster due to an injury.
- June 29, 2015: The Aviators announced that James Blake would coach the team in its season-opening match on July 12, at home against the California Dream. Following that match, John Lloyd will serve as the Aviators coach for the remainder of the season.
- July 12, 2015: The Aviators announced that James Blake would play for (in addition to coach) the team in its season-opening match.
- July 26, 2015: With a record of 4 wins and 7 losses, the Aviators were eliminated from playoff contention when the California Dream defeated the Philadelphia Freedoms, 22–16.
- July 29, 2015: The Aviators added Daniel Nguyen to their roster as a substitute player.

== Draft picks ==
Since the Aviators had the better record of the two conference championship losers in 2014, they selected third from the bottom in each round of the draft. Unlike previous seasons in which WTT conducted its Marquee Player Draft and its Roster Player Draft on different dates about one month apart, the league conducted a single draft at the Indian Wells Tennis Garden in Indian Wells, California on March 16, 2015. The selections made by the Aviators are shown in the table below.

Draft type	Round	No.	Overall	Player chosen	Prot?	Notes
Marquee	1	5	5	(United States) Madison Keys	N	Designated
Marquee	2	5	12	Pass	–	
Marquee	3	5	19	Pass	–	
Roster	1	5	5	(United States) Taylor Fritz	N	Amateur
Roster	2	5	12	(South Africa) Raven Klaasen	Y	
Roster	3	5	19	(South Africa) Chanelle Scheepers	N	
Roster	4	5	26	(Czech Republic) Květa Peschke	Y	

== Match log ==
Legend
Aviators Win	Aviators Loss
Home team in CAPS

Match	Date	Venue and location	Result and details	Record
1	July 12	Omni La Costa Resort & Spa; Carlsbad, California	SAN DIEGO AVIATORS 24, California Dream 19 * WS: Chanelle Scheepers (Aviators) 5, Jarmila Gajdošová (Dream) 4 * MS: Tennys Sandgren (Dream) 5, James Blake (Aviators) 4 * MD: Raven Klaasen/James Blake (Aviators) 5, Tennys Sandgren/Neal Skupski (Dream) 2 * XD: Raven Klaasen/Darija Jurak (Aviators) 5, Neal Skupski/Jarmila Gajdošová (Dream) 4 * WD: Darija Jurak/Chanelle Scheepers (Aviators) 5, Jarmila Gajdošová/Anabel Medina Garrigues (Dream) 4	1–0
2	July 13	Omni La Costa Resort & Spa; Carlsbad, California	SAN DIEGO AVIATORS 22, Philadelphia Freedoms 21, (super tiebreaker, 7–5) * MD: Taylor Fritz/Raven Klaasen (Aviators) 5, Marcelo Melo/Robby Ginepri (Freedoms) 2 * WS: Coco Vandeweghe (Freedoms) 5, Chanelle Scheepers (Aviators) 4 * MS: Robby Ginepri (Freedoms) 5, Taylor Fritz (Aviators) 4 * WD: Coco Vandeweghe/Taylor Townsend (Freedoms) 5, Darija Jurak/Chanelle Scheepers (Aviators) 3 * XD: Raven Klaasen/Darija Jurak (Aviators) 5, Marcelo Melo/Coco Vandeweghe (Freedoms) 4 * STB - XD: Raven Klaasen/Darija Jurak (Aviators) 7, Marcelo Melo/Coco Vandeweghe (Freedoms) 5	2–0
3	July 15	Boston Lobsters Tennis Center at the Manchester Athletic Club; Manchester-by-the-Sea, Massachusetts	BOSTON LOBSTERS 25, San Diego Aviators 13 * MS: Alex Kuznetsov (Lobsters) 5, Taylor Fritz (Aviators) 2 * WS: Irina Falconi (Lobsters) 5, Chanelle Scheepers (Aviators) 3 * MD: Alex Kuznetsov/Scott Lipsky (Lobsters) 5, Taylor Fritz/Raven Klaasen (Aviators) 4 * WD: Irina Falconi/Arantxa Parra Santonja (Lobsters) 5, Darija Jurak/Chanelle Scheepers (Aviators) 2 * XD: Arantxa Parra Santonja/Scott Lipsky (Lobsters) 5, Darija Jurak/Raven Klaasen (Aviators) 2	2–1
4	July 16	Kastles Stadium at the Charles E. Smith Center; Washington, District of Columbia	San Diego Aviators 22, WASHINGTON KASTLES 18 * MS: Taylor Fritz (Aviators) 5, Denis Kudla (Kastles) 3 * WD: Darija Jurak/Chanelle Scheepers (Aviators) 5, Anastasia Rodionova/Madison Brengle (Kastles) 4 * MD: Leander Paes/Denis Kudla (Kastles) 5, Taylor Fritz/Raven Klaasen (Aviators) 2 * WS: Chanelle Scheepers (Aviators) 5, Madison Brengle (Kastles) 3 * XD: Darija Jurak/Raven Klaasen (Aviators) 5, Leander Paes/Anastasia Rodionova (Kastles) 3	3–1
5	July 17	Mediacom Stadium at Cooper Tennis Complex; Springfield, Missouri	SPRINGFIELD LASERS 22, San Diego Aviators 19 * MD: Raven Klaasen/Taylor Fritz (Aviators) 5, Michael Russell/Andre Begemann (Lasers) 4 * WD: Anna-Lena Grönefeld/Sachia Vickery (Lasers) 5, Darija Jurak/Chanelle Scheepers (Aviators) 1 * MS: Taylor Fritz (Aviators) 5, Michael Russell (Lasers) 3 * WS: Sachia Vickery (Lasers) 5, Chanelle Scheepers (Aviators) 4 * XD: Andre Begemann/Anna-Lena Grönefeld (Lasers) 5, Raven Klaasen/Darija Jurak (Aviators) 4	3–2
6	July 19	Omni La Costa Resort & Spa; Carlsbad, California	Boston Lobsters at SAN DIEGO AVIATORS; Postponed due to rain. Make-up on July 20 at 10:00 a.m. PDT	3–2
6	July 20 (10:00 a.m. PDT)	Omni La Costa Resort & Spa; Carlsbad, California	Boston Lobsters 20, SAN DIEGO AVIATORS 19 * MD: Jan-Michael Gambill/Scott Lipsky (Lobsters) 5, Raven Klaasen/Taylor Fritz (Aviators) 4 * WS: Chanelle Scheepers (Aviators) 5, Irina Falconi (Lobsters) 3 * MS: Taylor Fritz (Aviators) 5, Jan-Michael Gambill (Lobsters) 2 * WD: Irina Falconi/Arantxa Parra Santonja (Lobsters) 5, Chanelle Scheepers/Darija Jurak (Aviators) 2 * XD: Arantxa Parra Santonja/Scott Lipsky (Lobsters) 5, Darija Jurak/Raven Klaasen (Aviators) 3	3–3
7	July 20 (7:00 p.m. PDT)	Omni La Costa Resort & Spa; Carlsbad, California	Austin Aces 24, SAN DIEGO AVIATORS 17 * MD: Jarmere Jenkins/Teymuraz Gabashvili (Aces) 5, Raven Klaasen/Taylor Fritz (Aviators) 4 * WS: Chanelle Scheepers (Aviators) 5, Nicole Gibbs (Aces) 4 * MS: Teymuraz Gabashvili (Aces) 5, Taylor Fritz (Aviators) 3 * WD: Nicole Gibbs/Alla Kudryavtseva (Aces) 5, Chanelle Scheepers/Darija Jurak (Aviators) 3 * XD: Teymuraz Gabashvili/Alla Kudryavtseva (Aces) 5, Raven Klaasen/Darija Jurak (Aviators) 2	3–4
8	July 22	Omni La Costa Resort & Spa; Carlsbad, California	California Dream 25, SAN DIEGO AVIATORS 11 * MD: Neal Skupski/Tennys Sandgren (Dream) 5, Raven Klaasen/Taylor Fritz (Aviators) 3 * WS: Jarmila Gajdošová (Dream) 5, Chanelle Scheepers (Aviators) 0 * MS: Tennys Sandgren (Dream) 5, Taylor Fritz (Aviators) 4 * WD: Anabel Medina Garrigues/Jarmila Gajdošová (Dream) 5, Chanelle Scheepers/Darija Jurak (Aviators) 3 * XD: Neal Skupski/Anabel Medina Garrigues (Dream) 5, Raven Klaasen/Darija Jurak (Aviators) 1	3–5
9	July 23	Dream Stadium at Sunrise Mall; Citrus Heights, California	CALIFORNIA DREAM 20, San Diego Aviators 19 * MS: Taylor Fritz (Aviators) 5, Tennys Sandgren (Dream) 4 * WS: Chanelle Scheepers (Aviators) 5, Jarmila Gajdošová (Dream) 3 * XD: Mike Bryan/Anabel Medina Garrigues (Dream) 5, Raven Klaasen/Darija Jurak (Aviators) 3 * WD: Chanelle Scheepers/Darija Jurak (Aviators) 5, Anabel Medina Garrigues/Jarmila Gajdošová (Dream) 3 * MD: Bob Bryan/Mike Bryan (Dream) 5, Raven Klaasen/Taylor Fritz (Aviators) 1	3–6
10	July 25	Mediacom Stadium at Cooper Tennis Complex; Springfield, Missouri	San Diego Aviators 25, SPRINGFIELD LASERS 17 * XD: Raven Klaasen/Darija Jurak (Aviators) 5, Andre Begemann/Anna-Lena Grönefeld (Lasers) 3 * WS: Chanelle Scheepers (Aviators) 5, Alison Riske (Lasers) 3 * MD: Taylor Fritz/Raven Klaasen (Aviators) 5, John Isner/Andre Begemann (Lasers) 4 * WD: Chanelle Scheepers/Darija Jurak (Aviators) 5, Alison Riske/Anna-Lena Grönefeld (Lasers) 3 * MS: Taylor Fritz (Aviators) 5, John Isner (Lasers) 4	4–6
11	July 26	Gregory Gymnasium; Austin, Texas	AUSTIN ACES 25, San Diego Aviators 8 * XD: Teymuraz Gabashvili/Alla Kudryavtseva (Aces) 5, Raven Klaasen/Darija Jurak (Aviators) 3 * WD: Alla Kudryavtseva/Nicole Gibbs (Aces) 5, Chanelle Scheepers/Darija Jurak (Aviators) 0 * MD: Jarmere Jenkins/Teymuraz Gabashvili (Aces) 5, Raven Klaasen/Taylor Fritz (Aviators) 2 * WS: Nicole Gibbs (Aces) 5, Chanelle Scheepers (Aviators) 0 * MS: Jarmere Jenkins (Aces) 5, Taylor Fritz (Aviators) 3	4–7
12	July 27	Omni La Costa Resort & Spa; Carlsbad, California	Austin Aces 25, SAN DIEGO AVIATORS 13 (extended play) * MD: Teymuraz Gabashvili/Jarmere Jenkins (Aces) 5, Taylor Fritz/Raven Klaasen (Aviators) 0 * WD: Alla Kudryavtseva/Elina Svitolina (Aces) 5, Madison Keys/Darija Jurak (Aviators) 0 * MS: Teymuraz Gabashvili (Aces) 5, Taylor Fritz (Aviators) 3 * XD: Teymuraz Gabashvili/Alla Kudryavtseva (Aces) 5, Raven Klaasen/Darija Jurak (Aviators) 2 * WS: Madison Keys (Aviators) 5, Nicole Gibbs (Aces) 4 * EP - WS: Madison Keys (Aviators) 3, Nicole Gibbs (Aces) 1	4–8
13	July 28	Omni La Costa Resort & Spa; Carlsbad, California	SAN DIEGO AVIATORS 22, Springfield Lasers 16 * MD: Andre Begemann/Michael Russell (Lasers) 5, Taylor Fritz/Raven Klaasen (Aviators) 3 * WD: Madison Keys/Chanelle Scheepers (Aviators) 5, Anna-Lena Grönefeld/Alison Riske (Lasers) 2 * MS: Taylor Fritz (Aviators) 5, Michael Russell (Lasers) 4 * XD: Andre Begemann/Anna-Lena Grönefeld (Lasers) 5, Raven Klaasen/Chanelle Scheepers (Aviators) 4 * WS: Madison Keys (Aviators) 5, Alison Riske (Lasers) 0	5–8
14	July 29	Dream Stadium at Sunrise Mall; Citrus Heights, California	CALIFORNIA DREAM 20, San Diego Aviators 15 * MD: Daniel Nguyen/Raven Klaasen (Aviators) 5, Neal Skupski/Tennys Sandgren (Dream) 3 * WS: Jarmila Gajdošová (Dream) 5, Chanelle Scheepers (Aviators) 0 * XD: Darija Jurak/Raven Klaasen (Aviators) 5, Jarmila Gajdošová/Neal Skupski (Dream) 2 *** Jarmila Gajdošová substituted for Anabel Medina Garrigues at 2–4 * WD: Anabel Medina Garrigues/Jarmila Gajdošová (Dream) 5, Chanelle Scheepers/Darija Jurak (Aviators) 2 * MS: Tennys Sandgren (Dream) 5, Daniel Nguyen (Aviators) 3	5–9

== Team personnel ==
=== Players and coaches ===
- (United Kingdom) John Lloyd, Coach (other than July 12 match)
- (United States) James Blake, Player-Coach (July 12 match only)
- (United States) Jim Ault, Assistant Coach
- (United States) Taylor Fritz
- (Croatia) Darija Jurak
- (United States) Madison Keys
- (South Africa) Raven Klaasen
- (United States) Daniel Nguyen (Note: Player appeared in fewer than three matches during the season as a substitute player and was not eligible to be protected in the following year's draft.)
- (Czech Republic) Květa Peschke (injured, did not play)
- (South Africa) Chanelle Scheepers

=== Front office ===
- Fred Luddy, Principal Owner
- Billy Berger, Minority Owner and CEO
- Jack McGrory, Minority Owner

== Statistics ==
Players are listed in order of their game-winning percentage provided they played in at least 40% of the Aviators' games in that event, which is the WTT minimum for qualification for league leaders in individual statistical categories.

Men's singles

Player	GP	GW	GL	PCT	A	DF	BPW	BPP	BP%	3APW	3APP	3AP%
Taylor Fritz	99	49	50	.495	31	8	9	22	.409	5	18	.278
James Blake	9	4	5	.444	0	0	1	2	.500	1	1	1.000
Daniel Nguyen	8	3	5	.378	0	2	1	1	1.000	0	0	-
Total	116	56	60	.483	31	10	11	25	.440	6	19	.316

Women's singles

Player	GP	GW	GL	PCT	A	DF	BPW	BPP	BP%	3APW	3APP	3AP%
Chanelle Scheepers	91	41	50	.451	2	24	15	35	.429	12	23	.522
Madison Keys	18	13	5	.722	3	0	5	12	.417	2	4	.500
Total	109	54	55	.495	5	24	20	47	.426	14	27	.519

Men's doubles

Player	GP	GW	GL	PCT	A	DF	BPW	BPP	BP%	3APW	3APP	3AP%
Raven Klaasen	108	48	60	.444	5	4	10	26	.385	11	23	.478
Taylor Fritz	93	38	55	.409	12	2	8	21	.381	10	20	.500
James Blake	7	5	2	.714	0	1	1	3	.333	1	2	.500
Daniel Nguyen	8	5	3	.625	1	0	1	2	.500	0	1	.000
Total	108	48	60	.444	18	7	10	26	.385	11	23	.478

Women's doubles

Player	GP	GW	GL	PCT	A	DF	BPW	BPP	BP%	3APW	3APP	3AP%
Chanelle Scheepers	97	41	56	.423	3	9	12	28	.429	12	25	.480
Darija Jurak	95	36	59	.379	0	8	10	26	.385	10	24	.417
Madison Keys	12	5	7	.417	0	1	2	4	.500	2	3	.667
Total	102	41	61	.402	3	18	12	29	.414	12	26	.462

Mixed doubles

Player	GP	GW	GL	PCT	A	DF	BPW	BPP	BP%	3APW	3APP	3AP%
Darija Jurak	102	46	56	.451	2	6	8	30	.267	11	29	.379
Raven Klaasen	111	50	61	.450	12	5	9	33	.273	12	30	.400
Chanelle Scheepers	9	4	5	.444	0	3	1	3	.333	1	1	1.000
Total	111	50	61	.450	14	14	9	33	.273	12	30	.400

Team totals

Event	GP	GW	GL	PCT	A	DF	BPW	BPP	BP%	3APW	3APP	3AP%
Men's singles	116	56	60	.483	31	10	11	25	.440	6	19	.316
Women's singles	109	54	55	.495	5	24	20	47	.426	14	27	.519
Men's doubles	108	48	60	.444	18	7	10	26	.385	11	23	.478
Women's doubles	102	41	61	.402	3	18	12	29	.414	12	26	.462
Mixed doubles	111	50	61	.450	14	14	9	33	.273	12	30	.400
Total	546	249	297	.456	71	73	62	160	.388	55	125	.443

== Transactions ==
- March 16, 2015: The Aviators traded Bob and Mike Bryan to the California Dream for financial consideration.
- March 16, 2015: The Aviators protected roster players Raven Klaasen and Květa Peschke and selected Madison Keys as a league-designated marquee player, Taylor Fritz as an amateur player and Chanelle Scheepers as a roster player at the WTT draft.
- March 16, 2015: The Aviators left Daniela Hantuchová and Somdev Devvarman unprotected in the WTT Draft effectively making them free agents.
- June 2, 2015: The Aviators signed Darija Jurak as a roster player, and Květa Peschke was removed from the active roster due to an injury.
- July 21, 2015: The Aviators signed James Blake as a wildcard player.
- July 29, 2015: The Aviators added Daniel Nguyen to their roster as a substitute player.
