= 2015 Springfield Lasers season =

- Conference: 4th Western

Record
- 2015 record: 3 wins, 11 losses
- Home record: 2 wins, 5 losses
- Road record: 1 win, 6 losses
- Games won–lost: 247–302

Team info
- Owner(s): Springfield-Greene County Park Board represented by John Cooper
- President/CEO: Bob Belote
- General manager: Paul Nahon
- Coach: John-Laffnie de Jager
- Stadium: Mediacom Stadium at Cooper Tennis Complex (capacity: 2,500)

The 2015 Springfield Lasers season was the 20th season of the franchise in World TeamTennis (WTT).

The Lasers had 3 wins and 11 losses, the worst record in WTT in 2015, and failed to qualify for the playoffs.

== Season recap ==
=== Trade for Isner and draft ===
At the WTT Draft on March 16, 2015, it was announced that the Lasers had acquired the top-ranked American player John Isner in a trade with the Boston Lobsters for undisclosed consideration which was presumably financial, since no other players or draft choices were moved in connection with the deal. As the trade was announced, Isner said, "I’m really looking forward to joining the Springfield Lasers. I know Springfield has first-class tennis fans and the Lasers have been extremely close to bringing home the King Trophy the past couple of seasons. I’m very hopeful to help put them over the top in 2015." In the roster portion of the draft, the Lasers protected Anna-Lena Grönefeld and Michael Russell and selected Andre Begemann and roster-exempt player Alison Riske.

=== Other player transactions ===
On May 12, 2015, the Lasers signed Shelby Rogers as a substitute player. Rogers was a member of the 2014 WTT Champion Washington Kastles.

On July 10, 2015, the Lasers announced that Rogers would miss the 2015 season due to an injury. In her place, the Lasers signed Varvara Lepchenko and Sachia Vickery as substitute players.

=== A season of struggles ===
Things didn't go well for the Lasers from the start of the season. They lost their first four matches with three of those losses coming at home. They finally broke through with a win in front of the home fans on July 17, against the San Diego Aviators. Anna-Lena Grönefeld and Sachia Vickery earned a key 5–1 set win in women's doubles to help the cause. Grönefeld teamed with Andre Begemann in mixed doubles to win the final set in a tiebreaker and close out the victory.

On the evening following their first victory, the Lasers visited the Austin Aces, who entered the match with 4 wins and 0 losses. Grönefeld and Vickery continued their solid play by taking the opening set of women's doubles, 5–2. Vickery followed with a 5–1 set win in women's singles, and the Lasers had a 10–3 lead after two sets. But the Aces turns things around from there. They won the next two sets to cut the Lasers' lead to 16–13 heading to the final set. Teymuraz Gabashvili overpowered Michael Russell in the final set of men's singles, 5–2, to tie the match at 18 and send it to a super tiebreaker. Gabashvili dominated the super tiebreaker, 7–1, as the Aces dealt the Lasers a heartbreaking 19–18 defeat.

After the loss, the Lasers visited the Philadelphia Freedoms the next evening. The Freedoms won the first two sets to take a 10–6 lead. Russell and Begemann won the men's doubles set, 5–3, to cut the lead to 13–11. The Freedoms won the women's doubles set in a tiebreaker and took an 18–15 lead to the final set. In the men's singles, Russell redeemed himself after letting the previous match get away. He earned a 5–1 set win over Robby Ginepri that won the match for the Lasers in stunning fashion, 20–19.

After losing their next two matches, the Lasers hosted the Freedoms on July 24. It was marquee player John Isner who made the difference for the Lasers. He teamed with Begemann for a 5–2 set win in men's doubles that gave the Lasers a 14–11 lead after three sets. The Freedoms took the fourth set of women's doubles, 5–2, to tie the match at 16. In the final set, Isner beat Ginepri, 5–2, to give the Lasers a 21–18 victory that improved their record to 3 wins and 7 losses.

The following evening, the Lasers were eliminated from WTT playoff contention when the California Dream defeated the Boston Lobsters, 21–19, in extended play, a match which ended during the Lasers' 25–17 home loss to the Aviators.

The loss to the Aviators was the first of four consecutive losses by the Lasers to close the season.

== Event chronology ==
- March 16, 2015: The Lasers acquired John Isner in a trade with the Boston Lobsters for undisclosed consideration.
- March 16, 2015: The Lasers protected Anna-Lena Grönefeld and Michael Russell and selected Andre Begemann and roster-exempt player Alison Riske in the WTT Draft.
- May 12, 2015: The Lasers signed Shelby Rogers as a substitute player.
- July 10, 2015: The Lasers signed Varvara Lepchenko and Sachia Vickery as substitute players.
- July 25, 2015: With a record of 3 wins and 7 losses, the Lasers were eliminated from WTT playoff contention when the California Dream defeated the Boston Lobsters, 21–19, in extended play.

== Draft picks ==
Since the Lasers were the Western Conference champions in 2014, they selected next to last (sixth) in each round of the draft. Unlike previous seasons in which WTT conducted its Marquee Player Draft and its Roster Player Draft on different dates about one month apart, the league conducted a single draft at the Indian Wells Tennis Garden in Indian Wells, California on March 16, 2015. The selections made by the Lasers are shown in the table below.

Draft type	Round	No.	Overall	Player chosen	Prot?	Notes
Marquee	1	6	6	(United States) John Isner	Y	
Marquee	2	6	13	Pass	–	
Marquee	3	6	20	Pass	–	
Roster	1	6	6	(Germany) Andre Begemann	N	
Roster	2	6	13	(United States) Alison Riske	N	Exempt
Roster	3	6	20	(Germany) Anna-Lena Grönefeld	Y	
Roster	4	6	27	(United States) Michael Russell	Y	
Roster	5 (Note: The Lasers drafted one exempt player during the first four rounds of the roster draft and could have selected another player in the fifth round.)	1	29	Pass	–	

== Match log ==
Legend
Lasers Win	Lasers Loss
Home team in CAPS

Match	Date	Venue and location	Result and details	Record
1	July 12	Mediacom Stadium at Cooper Tennis Complex; Springfield, Missouri	Philadelphia Freedoms 22, SPRINGFIELD LASERS 15 * XD: Andre Begemann/Anna-Lena Grönefeld (Lasers) 5, Marcelo Melo/Coco Vandeweghe (Freedoms) 2 * WD: Coco Vandeweghe/Taylor Townsend (Freedoms) 5, Anna-Lena Grönefeld/Varvara Lepchenko (Lasers) 4 * MD: Robby Ginepri/Marcelo Melo (Freedoms) 5, Andre Begemann/Michael Russell (Lasers) 4 * WS: Coco Vandeweghe (Freedoms) 5, Varvara Lepchenko (Lasers) 1 * MS: Robby Ginepri (Freedoms) 5, Michael Russell (Lasers) 1	0–1
2	July 13	Dream Stadium at Sunrise Mall; Citrus Heights, California	CALIFORNIA DREAM 23, Springfield Lasers 18 (extended play) * MS: Tennys Sandgren (Dream) 5, Michael Russell (Lasers) 4 * WD: Jarmila Gajdošová/Anabel Medina Garrigues (Dream) 5, Anna-Lena Grönefeld/Varvara Lepchenko (Lasers) 2 * XD: Neal Skupski/Anabel Medina Garrigues (Dream) 5, Andre Begemann/Anna-Lena Grönefeld (Lasers) 2 * WS: Varvara Lepchenko (Lasers) 5, Jarmila Gajdošová (Dream) 4 * MD: Andre Begemann/Michael Russell (Lasers) 5, Tennys Sandgren/Neal Skupski (Dream) 3 * EP - MD: Tennys Sandgren/Neal Skupski (Dream) 1, Andre Begemann/Michael Russell (Lasers) 0	0–2
3	July 14	Mediacom Stadium at Cooper Tennis Complex; Springfield, Missouri	Boston Lobsters 25, SPRINGFIELD LASERS 18 (extended play) * MS: Alex Kuznetsov (Lobsters) 5, Michael Russell (Lasers) 3 * WS: Irina Falconi (Lobsters) 5, Varvara Lepchenko (Lasers) 4 * MD: Alex Kuznetsov/Scott Lipsky (Lobsters) 5, Andre Begemann/Michael Russell (Lasers) 4 * WD: Irina Falconi/Arantxa Parra Santonja (Lobsters) 5, Anna-Lena Grönefeld/Varvara Lepchenko (Lasers) 0 * XD: Andre Begemann/Anna-Lena Grönefeld (Lasers) 5, Scott Lipsky/Arantxa Parra Santonja (Lobsters) 4 * EP - XD: Andre Begemann/Anna-Lena Grönefeld (Lasers) 2, Scott Lipsky/Arantxa Parra Santonja (Lobsters) 1	0–3
4	July 15	Mediacom Stadium at Cooper Tennis Complex; Springfield, Missouri	Washington Kastles 21, SPRINGFIELD LASERS 16 * MS: Denis Kudla (Kastles) 5, Michael Russell (Lasers) 4 * WD: Anna-Lena Grönefeld/Varvara Lepchenko (Lasers) 5, Madison Brengle/Anastasia Rodionova (Kastles) 1 * MD: Denis Kudla/Leander Paes (Kastles) 5, Andre Begemann/Michael Russell (Lasers) 0 * WS: Madison Brengle (Kastles) 5, Varvara Lepchenko (Lasers) 3 * XD: Leander Paes/Anastasia Rodionova (Kastles) 5, Andre Begemann/Anna-Lena Grönefeld (Lasers) 4	0–4
5	July 17	Mediacom Stadium at Cooper Tennis Complex; Springfield, Missouri	SPRINGFIELD LASERS 22, San Diego Aviators 19 * MD: Raven Klaasen/Taylor Fritz (Aviators) 5, Michael Russell/Andre Begemann (Lasers) 4 * WD: Anna-Lena Grönefeld/Sachia Vickery (Lasers) 5, Darija Jurak/Chanelle Scheepers (Aviators) 1 * MS: Taylor Fritz (Aviators) 5, Michael Russell (Lasers) 3 * WS: Sachia Vickery (Lasers) 5, Chanelle Scheepers (Aviators) 4 * XD: Andre Begemann/Anna-Lena Grönefeld (Lasers) 5, Raven Klaasen/Darija Jurak (Aviators) 4	1–4
6	July 18	Gregory Gymnasium; Austin, Texas	AUSTIN ACES 19, Springfield Lasers 18 (super tiebreaker, 7–1) * WD: Anna-Lena Grönefeld/Sachia Vickery (Lasers) 5, Nicole Gibbs/Alla Kudryavtseva (Aces) 2 * WS: Sachia Vickery (Lasers) 5, Alla Kudryavtseva (Aces) 1 *** Alla Kudryavtseva substituted for Nicole Gibbs at 1–4 * XD: Alla Kudryavtseva/Teymuraz Gabashvili (Aces) 5, Anna-Lena Grönefeld/Andre Begemann (Lasers) 2 * MD: Teymuraz Gabashvili/Jarmere Jenkins (Aces) 5, Andre Begemann/Michael Russell (Lasers) 4 * MS: Teymuraz Gabashvili (Aces) 5, Michael Russell (Lasers) 2 * STB - MS: Teymuraz Gabashvili (Aces) 7, Michael Russell (Lasers) 1	1–5
7	July 19	The Pavilion; Radnor Township, Pennsylvania	Springfield Lasers 20, PHILADELPHIA FREEDOMS 19 * XD: Marcelo Melo/Taylor Townsend (Freedoms) 5, Andre Begemann/Anna-Lena Grönefeld (Lasers) 2 * WS: Taylor Townsend (Freedoms) 5, Sachia Vickery (Lasers) 4 * MD: Andre Begemann/Michael Russell (Lasers) 5, Marcelo Melo/Robby Ginepri (Freedoms) 3 * WD: Taylor Townsend/Asia Muhammad (Freedoms) 5, Anna-Lena Grönefeld/Sachia Vickery (Lasers) 4 * MS: Michael Russell (Lasers) 5, Robby Ginepri (Freedoms) 1	2–5
8	July 21	Dream Stadium at Sunrise Mall; Citrus Heights, California	CALIFORNIA DREAM 22, Springfield Lasers 19 * MS: Michael Russell (Lasers) 5, Tennys Sandgren (Dream) 3 * WS: Jarmila Gajdošová (Dream) 5, Sachia Vickery (Lasers) 3 * MD: Andre Begemann/Michael Russell (Lasers) 5, Neal Skupski/Tennys Sandgren (Dream) 4 * WD: Jarmila Gajdošová/Anabel Medina Garrigues (Dream) 5, Anna-Lena Grönefeld/Sachia Vickery (Lasers) 4 * XD: Anabel Medina Garrigues/Neal Skupski (Dream) 5, Anna-Lena Grönefeld/Andre Begemann (Lasers) 2	2–6
9	July 22	Mediacom Stadium at Cooper Tennis Complex; Springfield, Missouri	Austin Aces 23, SPRINGFIELD LASERS 16 * MS: Teymuraz Gabashvili (Aces) 5, Michael Russell (Lasers) 3 * XD: Alla Kudryavtseva/Teymuraz Gabashvili (Aces) 5, Anna-Lena Grönefeld/Andre Begemann (Lasers) 4 * MD: Andre Begemann/Michael Russell (Lasers) 5, Teymuraz Gabashvili/Jarmere Jenkins (Aces) 3 * WD: Nicole Gibbs/Alla Kudryavtseva (Aces) 5, Anna-Lena Grönefeld/Alison Riske (Lasers) 3 * WS: Nicole Gibbs (Aces) 5, Alison Riske (Lasers) 1	2–7
10	July 24	Mediacom Stadium at Cooper Tennis Complex; Springfield, Missouri	SPRINGFIELD LASERS 21, Philadelphia Freedoms 18 * XD: Marcelo Melo/Taylor Townsend (Freedoms) 5, Andre Begemann/Anna-Lena Grönefeld (Lasers) 4 * WS: Alison Riske (Lasers) 5, Taylor Townsend (Freedoms) 4 * MD: John Isner/Andre Begemann (Lasers) 5, Marcelo Melo/Robby Ginepri (Freedoms) 2 * WD: Abigail Spears/Taylor Townsend (Freedoms) 5, Alison Riske/Anna-Lena Grönefeld (Lasers) 2 * MS: John Isner (Lasers) 5, Robby Ginepri (Freedoms) 2	3–7
11	July 25	Mediacom Stadium at Cooper Tennis Complex; Springfield, Missouri	San Diego Aviators 25, SPRINGFIELD LASERS 17 * XD: Raven Klaasen/Darija Jurak (Aviators) 5, Andre Begemann/Anna-Lena Grönefeld (Lasers) 3 * WS: Chanelle Scheepers (Aviators) 5, Alison Riske (Lasers) 3 * MD: Taylor Fritz/Raven Klaasen (Aviators) 5, John Isner/Andre Begemann (Lasers) 4 * WD: Chanelle Scheepers/Darija Jurak (Aviators) 5, Alison Riske/Anna-Lena Grönefeld (Lasers) 3 * MS: Taylor Fritz (Aviators) 5, John Isner (Lasers) 4	3–8
12	July 26	Kastles Stadium at the Charles E. Smith Center; Washington, District of Columbia	WASHINGTON KASTLES 24, Springfield Lasers 16 (extended play) * XD: Leander Paes/Martina Hingis (Kastles) 5, Andre Begemann/Anna-Lena Grönefeld (Lasers) 4 * WS: Alison Riske (Lasers) 5, Martina Hingis (Kastles) 4 * MD: Leander Paes/Sam Querrey (Kastles) 5, Michael Russell/Andre Begemann (Lasers) 0 * WD: Martina Hingis/Anastasia Rodionova (Kastles) 5, Anna-Lena Grönefeld/Alison Riske (Lasers) 2 * MS: Michael Russell (Lasers) 5, Sam Querrey (Kastles) 4 * EP - MS: Sam Querrey (Kastles) 1, Michael Russell (Lasers) 0	3–9
13	July 28	Omni La Costa Resort and Spa; Carlsbad, California	SAN DIEGO AVIATORS 22, Springfield Lasers 16 * MD: Andre Begemann/Michael Russell (Lasers) 5, Taylor Fritz/Raven Klaasen (Aviators) 3 * WD: Madison Keys/Chanelle Scheepers (Aviators) 5, Anna-Lena Grönefeld/Alison Riske (Lasers) 2 * MS: Taylor Fritz (Aviators) 5, Michael Russell (Lasers) 4 * XD: Andre Begemann/Anna-Lena Grönefeld (Lasers) 5, Raven Klaasen/Chanelle Scheepers (Aviators) 4 * WS: Madison Keys (Aviators) 5, Alison Riske (Lasers) 0	3–10
14	July 29	Gregory Gymnasium; Austin, Texas	AUSTIN ACES 21, Springfield Lasers 15 * MD: Teymuraz Gabashvili/Jarmere Jenkins (Aces) 5, Michael Russell/Andre Begemann (Lasers) 4 * WD: Alison Riske/Anna-Lena Grönefeld (Lasers) 5, Elina Svitolina/Alla Kudryavtseva (Aces) 1 * MS: Teymuraz Gabashvili (Aces) 5, Michael Russell (Lasers) 2 * XD: Teymuraz Gabashvili/Alla Kudryavtseva (Aces) 5, Andre Begemann/Anna-Lena Grönefeld (Lasers) 1 * WS: Elina Svitolina (Aces) 5, Alison Riske (Lasers) 3	3–11

== Team personnel ==
=== On-court personnel ===
- (South Africa) John-Laffnie de Jager – Head Coach
- (Germany) Andre Begemann
- (Germany) Anna-Lena Grönefeld
- (United States) John Isner
- (United States) Varvara Lepchenko
- (United States) Alison Riske
- (United States) Shelby Rogers (injured, did not play) (Note: Player appeared in fewer than three matches during the season as a substitute player and was not eligible to be protected in the following year's draft.)
- (United States) Michael Russell
- (United States) Sachia Vickery

=== Front office ===
- Springfield-Greene County Park Board (represented by John Cooper) – Owner
- Bob Belote – Director
- Paul Nahon – General Manager

== Statistics ==
Players are listed in order of their game-winning percentage provided they played in at least 40% of the Lasers' games in that event, which is the WTT minimum for qualification for league leaders in individual statistical categories.

Men's singles

Player	GP	GW	GL	PCT	A	DF	BPW	BPP	BP%	3APW	3APP	3AP%
Michael Russell	96	42	54	.438	4	9	8	21	.381	16	27	.592
John Isner	16	9	7	.563	11	1	1	1	1.000	2	2	1.000
Total	112	51	61	.455	15	10	9	22	.409	18	29	.621

Women's singles

Player	GP	GW	GL	PCT	A	DF	BPW	BPP	BP%	3APW	3APP	3AP%
Alison Riske	45	17	28	.378	7	14	2	10	.200	4	11	.364
Sachia Vickery	32	17	15	.531	3	4	7	12	.583	2	5	.400
Varvara Lepchenko	32	13	19	.406	0	6	5	14	.357	5	10	.500
Total	109	47	62	.431	10	24	14	36	.389	11	26	.423

Men's doubles

Player	GP	GW	GL	PCT	A	DF	BPW	BPP	BP%	3APW	3APP	3AP%
Andre Begemann	112	53	59	.473	9	7	12	27	.444	10	24	.417
Michael Russell	96	44	52	.458	2	5	10	22	.455	10	23	.435
John Isner	16	9	7	.563	5	1	2	5	.400	0	1	.000
Total	112	53	59	.473	16	13	12	27	.444	10	24	.417

Women's doubles

Player	GP	GW	GL	PCT	A	DF	BPW	BPP	BP%	3APW	3APP	3AP%
Anna-Lena Grönefeld	101	46	55	.455	6	14	18	45	.400	9	31	.290
Alison Riske	43	17	26	.395	2	4	6	14	.429	2	11	.182
Sachia Vickery	31	18	13	.581	2	2	9	22	.409	4	13	.308
Varvara Lepchenko	27	11	16	.407	1	1	3	9	.333	3	7	.429
Total	101	46	55	.455	11	21	18	45	.400	9	31	.290

Mixed doubles

Player	GP	GW	GL	PCT	A	DF	BPW	BPP	BP%	3APW	3APP	3AP%
Andre Begemann	115	50	65	.435	12	8	9	18	.500	8	22	.364
Anna-Lena Grönefeld	115	50	65	.435	4	11	9	18	.500	8	22	.364
Total	115	50	65	.435	16	19	9	18	.500	8	22	.364

Team totals

Event	GP	GW	GL	PCT	A	DF	BPW	BPP	BP%	3APW	3APP	3AP%
Men's singles	112	51	61	.455	15	10	9	22	.409	18	29	.621
Women's singles	109	47	62	.431	10	24	14	36	.389	11	26	.423
Men's doubles	112	53	59	.473	16	13	12	27	.444	10	24	.417
Women's doubles	101	46	55	.455	11	21	18	45	.400	9	31	.290
Mixed doubles	115	50	65	.435	16	19	9	18	.500	8	22	.364
Total	549	247	302	.450	68	87	62	148	.419	56	132	.424

== Transactions ==
- March 16, 2015: The Lasers acquired John Isner in a trade with the Boston Lobsters for undisclosed consideration.
- March 16, 2015: The Lasers protected Anna-Lena Grönefeld and Michael Russell and selected Andre Begemann and roster-exempt player Alison Riske in the WTT Draft.
- March 16, 2015: The Lasers left James Blake, Līga Dekmeijere, Olga Govortsova, Ross Hutchins, Alisa Kleybanova, Raquel Kops-Jones, Jean-Julien Rojer and Abigail Spears unprotected in the WTT Draft effectively making them all free agents. Blake later signed with the San Diego Aviators as a wildcard player. Spears later signed with the Philadelphia Freedoms as a substitute player.
- May 12, 2015: The Lasers signed Shelby Rogers as a substitute player.
- July 10, 2015: The Lasers signed Varvara Lepchenko and Sachia Vickery as substitute players.
