= 2015 World TeamTennis season =

- 40th season logo
- League: World TeamTennis
- Sport: Team tennis
- Duration: July 12 – August 2, 2015
- Matches: Regular season: 49 (14 for each team); Postseason: 3
- Teams: 7
- TV partner(s): ESPN2; ESPN3; Tennis Channel; Altitude Sports and Entertainment; Comcast SportsNet affiliates Mediacom Connections; MSG

World TeamTennis Player Draft
- Top draft pick: (Canada) Eugenie Bouchard
- Picked by: Boston Lobsters

Regular season
- Top seed: Austin Aces
- Season MVP: (Russia) Teymuraz Gabashvili (Male MVP) (Austin) (Spain) Anabel Medina Garrigues (Female co-MVP) (California) (Australia) Anastasia Rodionova (Female co-MVP) (Washington)

Eastern Conference
- Season champions: Washington Kastles
- Runners-up: Philadelphia Freedoms

Western Conference
- Season champions: Austin Aces
- Runners-up: California Dream

Conference Championships
- Eastern Conference champions: Washington Kastles
- Eastern Conference runners-up: Philadelphia Freedoms
- Western Conference champions: Austin Aces
- Western Conference runners-up: California Dream

World TeamTennis Final
- Venue: Kastles Stadium at the Charles E. Smith Center
- Champions: Washington Kastles
- Runners-up: Austin Aces
- Finals MVP: (India) Leander Paes (Washington)

World TeamTennis seasons
- ← 2014 2016 →

The 2015 World TeamTennis season was the 40th season of the top professional team tennis league in the United States. Pursuant to a sponsorship agreement with Mylan N.V., the official name of the league was Mylan World TeamTennis in 2015. The Washington Kastles defeated the Austin Aces in the WTT Final to win their fifth consecutive King Trophy.

== Competition format ==
The 2015 World TeamTennis season included seven teams split into two conferences (Eastern and Western). The Eastern Conference had three teams, and the Western Conference had four teams. Each team played a 14-match regular-season schedule with seven home and seven away matches. The top two teams in each conference qualified for the conference championship matches hosted by the first-place finishers. The conference champions met in the World TeamTennis Final hosted in 2015, by the Eastern Conference champion. A Western Conference champion that is a higher seed than an Eastern Conference champion would be treated as the "home" team in the WTT Final and have the right to determine order of play. The winner of the WTT Final was awarded the King Trophy.

== Franchise movement ==
On February 23, 2015, WTT announced that a new ownership group had taken control of the Texas Wild and moved the team to Citrus Heights, California, renaming it the California Dream.

== Draft ==
Unlike previous seasons in which WTT conducted its Marquee Player Draft and its Roster Player Draft on different dates about one month apart, the league conducted a single draft at the Indian Wells Tennis Garden in Indian Wells, California on March 16, 2015. The order in which teams selected was based on the results the teams achieved in 2014, with weaker teams selecting earlier and stronger teams selecting later. The team with the worst regular-season record selected first in each round, and the remaining nonplayoff teams followed in order based on their records. After the nonplayoff teams chose, the conference championship loser with the worse record of the two selected and was followed by the other conference championship loser. The WTT runner up selected after the conference championship losers, and the WTT champion selected last. The draft position for the relocated California Dream franchise was based on the results achieved as the Texas Wild. Each team could protect certain players from its 2014 roster. Marquee players or doubles teams and wildcard players could be protected if they appeared in a match for the team in 2014. Exempt, roster and substitute players who appeared in at least three matches for the team in 2014, could also be protected. Teams could also protect players who qualified for protection based on match appearances in 2013, but were unable to play in 2014, due to injury. Teams holding the right to protect players could trade those rights before or during the draft. In another change from previous seasons, WTT eliminated its separate roster-exempt player draft. Instead, roster-exempt players were chosen in the roster player portion of the draft. Since roster-exempt players are not required to be full-time members of the team, the rule change makes it possible for a team to make four selections in the roster player portion of the draft and not have two male and two female full-time players. In such cases, these teams are permitted to make selections in additional rounds of the roster player draft until they have a complete roster. The selections made are shown in the tables below.

Marquee draft – first round

No.	Team	Player chosen	Prot?	Notes
1	Boston Lobsters	(Canada) Eugenie Bouchard	N	
2	California Dream	(United States) Bob and Mike Bryan	Y	Doubles team
3	Austin Aces	(United States) Andy Roddick	Y	
4	Philadelphia Freedoms	Pass	–	
5	San Diego Aviators	(United States) Madison Keys	N	Designated
6	Springfield Lasers	(United States) John Isner	Y	
7	Washington Kastles	(Switzerland) Martina Hingis	Y	

Marquee draft – second round

No.	Team	Player chosen	Prot?	Notes
1	Boston Lobsters	Pass	–	
2	California Dream	Pass	–	
3	Austin Aces	Pass	–	
4	Philadelphia Freedoms	Pass	–	
5	San Diego Aviators	Pass	–	
6	Springfield Lasers	Pass	–	
7	Washington Kastles	(United States) Venus Williams	Y	

Marquee draft – third round

No.	Team	Player chosen	Prot?	Notes
1	Boston Lobsters	Pass	–	
2	California Dream	Pass	–	
3	Austin Aces	Pass	–	
4	Philadelphia Freedoms	Pass	–	
5	San Diego Aviators	Pass	–	
6	Springfield Lasers	Pass	–	
7	Washington Kastles	(United States) Serena Williams	N	Designated

Roster draft – first round

No.	Team	Player chosen	Prot?	Notes
1	Boston Lobsters	(United States) Irina Falconi	N	
2	California Dream	(Australia) Jarmila Gajdošová	N	
3	Austin Aces	(United States) Nicole Gibbs	N	
4	Philadelphia Freedoms	(United States) Taylor Townsend	Y	
5	San Diego Aviators	(United States) Taylor Fritz	N	Amateur
6	Springfield Lasers	(Germany) Andre Begemann	N	
7	Washington Kastles	(United States) Sam Querrey	N	Exempt

Roster draft – second round

No.	Team	Player chosen	Prot?	Notes
1	Boston Lobsters	(United States) Scott Lipsky	N	
2	California Dream	(Spain) Anabel Medina Garrigues	N	
3	Austin Aces	(Russia) Alla Kudryavtseva	N	
4	Philadelphia Freedoms	(United States) Robby Ginepri	N	
5	San Diego Aviators	(South Africa) Raven Klaasen	Y	
6	Springfield Lasers	(United States) Alison Riske	N	Exempt
7	Washington Kastles	(India) Leander Paes	Y	

Roster draft – third round

No.	Team	Player chosen	Prot?	Notes
1	Boston Lobsters	(United States) Chase Buchanan	N	
2	California Dream	(United States) Tennys Sandgren	N	
3	Austin Aces	(United States) Jarmere Jenkins	N	
4	Philadelphia Freedoms	(Brazil) Marcelo Melo	Y	
5	San Diego Aviators	(South Africa) Chanelle Scheepers	N	
6	Springfield Lasers	(Germany) Anna-Lena Grönefeld	Y	
7	Washington Kastles	Pass	–	

Roster draft – fourth round

No.	Team	Player chosen	Prot?	Notes
1	Boston Lobsters	(Spain) Arantxa Parra Santonja	N	
2	California Dream	(Pakistan) Aisam Qureshi	N	
3	Austin Aces	(Russia) Teymuraz Gabashvili	N	
4	Philadelphia Freedoms	(United States) Liezel Huber	N	
5	San Diego Aviators	(Czech Republic) Květa Peschke	Y	
6	Springfield Lasers	(United States) Michael Russell	Y	
7	Washington Kastles	(Australia) Anastasia Rodionova	Y	

Roster draft – fifth round (Note: The Springfield Lasers and Washington Kastles each drafted one exempt player during the first four rounds of the roster draft and could have selected another player in the fifth round.)

No.	Team	Player chosen	Prot?	Notes
1	Springfield Lasers	Pass	–	
2	Washington Kastles	Pass	–	

== Event chronology ==
=== Off-season ===
- February 23, 2015: The Texas Wild relocated to Citrus Heights, California, and the team was renamed the California Dream.
- March 16, 2015: WTT conducted its 2015 player draft.

=== Regular season ===
- July 13, 2015: After opening the season with a loss on the road, the California Dream played its inaugural match at the new Dream Stadium at Sunrise Mall and defeated the Springfield Lasers, 23–18. Tennys Sandgren won the opening set of men's singles for the Dream in a tiebreaker. Jarmila Gajdošová and Anabel Medina Garrigues followed with a 5–2 set win in women's doubles to give the Dream a 10–6 lead. Anabel Medina Garrigues teamed with Neal Skupski in mixed doubles for another 5–2 set win to put the Dream was on top, 15–8. After Gajdošová lost the women's singles set in a tiebreaker, the Lasers took the final set of men's doubles, 5–3, to cut the Dream's lead to 22–18 and send the match to extended play. Sandgren and Skupski won the first game of extended play to secure the victory.
- July 24, 2015: The Washington Kastles earned a 22–14 road win over the Austin Aces, who entered the match with 8 wins and only 1 loss. The victory improved the Kastles' record to 7 wins and 3 losses and clinched their fifth consecutive playoff berth. The Kastles won four of the five sets in the convincing performance. Martina Hingis led the way, teaming with Leander Paes in the first set of mixed doubles and Anastasia Rodionova in the second set of women's doubles to give the Kastles an early 10–4 lead. Paes and Sam Querrey took the fourth set of men's doubles to extend the lead to 17–11, before Querrey took the final set of men's singles, 5–3, over Teymuraz Gabashvili to close out the match.
- July 25, 2015: With a record of 3 wins and 7 losses, the Springfield Lasers were eliminated from WTT playoff contention when the California Dream defeated the Boston Lobsters, 21–19, in extended play. The Lobsters' loss also clinched the top seed in the Eastern Conference and home-court advantage for the Eastern Conference Championship Match for the Washington Kastles.
- July 26, 2015: With a record of 9 wins and 2 losses, the Austin Aces clinched the franchise's first playoff berth since 2012, with a 25–8 victory over the San Diego Aviators.
- July 26, 2015: With a record of 8 wins and 4 losses, the California Dream clinched a playoff berth with a 22–16 win over the Philadelphia Freedoms. It is the first playoff berth for the franchise since 2013. The Dream's victory eliminated the San Diego Aviators, who had a record of 4 wins and 7 losses, from WTT playoff contention.
- July 27, 2015: With a record of 9 wins and 2 losses, the Austin Aces clinched the top seed in the Western Conference and home-court advantage for the Western Conference Championship Match when the Washington Kastles defeated the California Dream, 19–17.
- July 28, 2015: The Austin Aces defeated the four-time defending WTT champion Washington Kastles, 19–16, to improve their record to 11 wins and 2 losses and clinch the best overall regular-season record in WTT for 2015. Trailing 10–7 after two sets, Teymuraz Gabashvili gave the Aces a 12–10 lead with a 5–0 set win over Sam Querrey in men's singles. After dropping the fourth set of mixed doubles, the Aces found themselves trailing, 15–14, heading into the final set of women's singles. Elina Svitolina, making her Aces home debut, topped Madison Brengle, 5–1, to give the Aces the victory.
- July 29, 2015: With an opportunity to clinch the final available playoff spot on the final day of the regular season, the Boston Lobsters fell to the Washington Kastles, 22–14, clinching a playoff berth for the idle Philadelphia Freedoms. Since the Freedoms and Lobsters finished the regular season with identical 5–9 records, the WTT standings tiebreaker system was used to break the tie. The teams split their four regular-season meetings. So, the tie was broken by comparing games won in head-to-head matches, which favored the Freedoms, 78–71. The biggest contribution to this margin was made by the Freedoms' 24–14 road victory over the Lobsters on July 22.

=== Playoffs ===
- July 30, 2015: The four-time defending WTT Champion Washington Kastles opened the postseason defense of their title by hosting the Philadelphia Freedoms. The Kastles won all five sets en route to a 25–9 victory. Martina Hingis and Leander Paes opened the match with a 5–1 set win in mixed doubles. Madison Brengle followed by taking the women's singles, 5–2. Paes and Sam Querrey took the men's doubles, 5–2. Hingis and Anastasia Rodionova needed a tiebreaker to get past Taylor Townsend and Coco Vandeweghe in women's doubles. Querrey closed out the match by shutting out Robby Ginepri, 5–0.
- July 30, 2015: In the first-ever playoff match for both the Austin Aces and the California Dream since the relocations of their franchises from Orange County and Texas, respectively, the Aces won all five sets and posted a 25–14 victory. Teymuraz Gabashvili and Alla Kudryavtseva opened the match with a 5–2 set win in mixed doubles. Kudryavtseva and Elina Svitolina followed by taking the women's doubles, 5–3. Gabashvili and Jarmere Jenkins were pushed to a tiebreaker by Neal Skupski and amateur Tennys Sandgren. Svitolina handled Jarmila Gajdošová, 5–1, in the women's singles. Gabashvili closed out the match by taking a men's singles tiebreaker from Sandgren.
- August 2, 2015: The Washington Kastles won their fifth straight King Trophy as WTT champions with a 24–18 victory over the Austin Aces in extended play. The Kastles won the first four sets led by Martina Hingis and WTT Final Most Valuable Player Leander Paes who opened the match with a 5–2 set win in mixed doubles. Hingis and Anastasia Rodionova followed by taking the women's doubles set in a tiebreaker. Paes teamed up with Sam Querrey for a 5–3 triumph in men's doubles. Querrey won a tiebreaker against WTT Male Most Valuable Player Teymuraz Gabashvili in the men's singles set. Elina Svitolina topped Madison Brengle, 5–3, in women's singles to send the match to extended play with the Kastles leading, 23–18. Brengle secured the victory by breaking Svitolina in the first game of extended play.

== Standings ==
Eastern Conference
Pos	Team	MP	W	L	PCT	MB	GW	GL
1	Washington Kastles	14	10	4	.714	0	289	228
2	Philadelphia Freedoms	14	5	9	.357	5	260	267
3	Boston Lobsters	14	5	9	.357	5	253	283

2015 Eastern Conference Playoffs

Philadelphia and Boston split their head-to-head meetings during the regular season, 2 matches each. Philadelphia wins the tiebreaker on games won in head-to-head meetings, 78–71.

Western Conference
Pos	Team	MP	W	L	PCT	MB	GW	GL
1	Austin Aces	14	12	2	.857	0	290	235
2	California Dream	14	9	5	.643	3	283	259
3	San Diego Aviators	14	5	9	.357	7	249	297
4	Springfield Lasers	14	3	11	.214	9	247	302

2015 Western Conference Playoffs

Boston swept both head-to-head meetings with San Diego during the regular season and wins the tiebreaker in the overall standings.

== Results table ==
Abbreviation and Color Key: Austin Aces – AUS • Boston Lobsters – BOS • California Dream – CAL • Philadelphia Freedoms – PHI San Diego Aviators – SDA • Springfield Lasers – SPR • Washington Kastles – WAS Win • Loss • Home • Away
Team	Match													
Team	1	2	3	4	5	6	7	8	9	10	11	12	13	14
Austin Aces	BOS	WAS	CAL	CAL	SPR	CAL	SDA	SPR	PHI	WAS	SDA	SDA	WAS	SPR
Austin Aces	22–18 (EP)	22–17	20–19	22–16	19–18 (STB, 7–1)	20–18	24–17	23–16	14–22 (EP)	14–22	25–8	25–13 (EP)	19–16	21–15
Boston Lobsters	WAS	AUS	SPR	SDA	PHI	CAL	SDA	WAS	PHI	WAS	CAL	PHI	PHI	WAS
Boston Lobsters	17–20	18–22 (EP)	25–18 (EP)	25–13	21–17	17–20	20–19	13–25	14–24	14–25	19–21 (EP)	17–20	19–17 (EP)	14–22
California Dream	SDA	SPR	PHI	AUS	AUS	BOS	AUS	SPR	SDA	SDA	BOS	PHI	WAS	SDA
California Dream	19–24	23–18 (EP)	22–20	19–20	16–22	20–17	18–20	22–19	25–11	20–19	21–19 (EP)	22–16	17–19	20–15
Philadelphia Freedoms	SPR	SDA	CAL	BOS	WAS	WAS	SPR	WAS	BOS	AUS	SPR	CAL	BOS	BOS
Philadelphia Freedoms	22–19	21–22 (STB, 5–7)	20–22	17–21	20–21	6–23	19–20	18–16	24–14	22–14 (EP)	18–21	16–22	20–17	17–19 (EP)
San Diego Aviators	CAL	PHI	BOS	WAS	SPR	BOS	AUS	CAL	CAL	SPR	AUS	AUS	SPR	CAL
San Diego Aviators	24–19	22–21 (STB, 7–5)	13–25	22–18	19–22	19–20	17–24	11–25	19–20	25–17	8–25	13–25 (EP)	22–16	15–20
Springfield Lasers	PHI	CAL	BOS	WAS	SDA	AUS	PHI	CAL	AUS	PHI	SDA	WAS	SDA	AUS
Springfield Lasers	19–22	18–23 (EP)	18–25 (EP)	16–21	22–19	18–19 (STB, 1–7)	20–19	19–22	16–23	21–18	17–25	16–24 (EP)	16–22	15–21
Washington Kastles	BOS	AUS	SPR	SDA	PHI	PHI	PHI	BOS	BOS	AUS	SPR	CAL	AUS	BOS
Washington Kastles	20–17	17–22	21–16	18–22	21–20	23–6	16–18	25–13	25–14	22–14	24–16 (EP)	19–17	16–19	22–14

== Playoff bracket ==
Conference Championships (July 30)
E1	Washington Kastles	25
E2	Philadelphia Freedoms	9
W1	Austin Aces	25
W2	California Dream	14

WTT Final (August 2)
2	Washington Kastles	24*
1	Austin Aces	18

* indicates match went to extended play.

== Playoff match summaries ==
=== Eastern Conference Championship Match ===
July 30 at Kastles Stadium at Charles E. Smith Center, Washington, District of Columbia: Washington Kastles 25, Philadelphia Freedoms 9

- Mixed Doubles: Martina Hingis and Leander Paes (Kastles) def. Taylor Townsend and Marcelo Melo (Freedoms), 5–1
- Women's Singles: Madison Brengle (Kastles) def. Coco Vandeweghe (Freedoms), 5–2
- Men's Doubles: Leander Paes and Sam Querrey (Kastles) def. Robby Ginepri and Marcelo Melo (Freedoms), 5–2
- Women's Doubles: Martina Hingis and Anastasia Rodionova (Kastles) def. Taylor Townsend and Coco Vandeweghe (Freedoms), 5–4
- Men's Singles: Sam Querrey (Kastles) def. Robby Ginepri (Freedoms), 5–0

=== Western Conference Championship Match ===
July 30 at Gregory Gymnasium, Austin, Texas: Austin Aces 25, California Dream 14

- Mixed Doubles: Teymuraz Gabashvili and Alla Kudryavtseva (Aces) def. Neal Skupski and Anabel Medina Garrigues (Dream), 5–2
- Women's Doubles: Alla Kudryavtseva and Elina Svitolina (Aces) def. Anabel Medina Garrigues and Jarmila Gajdošová (Dream), 5–3
- Men's Doubles: Jarmere Jenkins and Teymuraz Gabashvili (Aces) def. Neal Skupski and Tennys Sandgren (Dream), 5–4
- Women's Singles: Elina Svitolina (Aces) def. Jarmila Gajdošová (Dream), 5–1
- Men's Singles: Teymuraz Gabashvili (Aces) def. Tennys Sandgren (Dream), 5–4

=== WTT Final Match ===
August 2 at Kastles Stadium at the Charles E. Smith Center, Washington, District of Columbia: (Note: Prior to the start of the season, WTT determined that the World TeamTennis Championship Match would be played on the home court of the Eastern Conference champion. Austin, as the higher seed, was treated as the "home" team under WTT rules for determining order of play.) Washington Kastles 24, Austin Aces 18 (extended play)

- Mixed Doubles: Martina Hingis and Leander Paes (Kastles) def. Alla Kudryavtseva and Teymuraz Gabashvili (Aces), 5–2
- Women's Doubles: Martina Hingis and Anastasia Rodionova (Kastles) def. Elina Svitolina and Alla Kudryavtseva (Aces), 5–4
- Men's Doubles: Leander Paes and Sam Querrey (Kastles) def. Teymuraz Gabashvili and Jarmere Jenkins (Aces), 5–3
- Men's Singles: Sam Querrey (Kastles) def. Teymuraz Gabashvili (Aces), 5–4
- Women's Singles: Elina Svitolina (Aces) def. Madison Brengle (Kastles), 5–3
- Extended Play – Women's Singles: Madison Brengle (Kastles) def. Elina Svitolina (Aces), 1–0

== Individual statistical leaders ==
The tables below show the WTT players who had the highest regular-season winning percentages in each of the league's five events. Only players who played in at least 40% of the total number of games played by their team in a particular event are eligible to be listed among the official WTT league leaders for that event.

Men's singles

Rank	Player	Team	GP	GW	GL	PCT
1	Teymuraz Gabashvili	Austin Aces	98	60	38	.612
2	Sam Querrey	Washington Kastles	59	35	24	.593
3	Alex Kuznetsov	Boston Lobsters	41	21	20	.512

Women's singles

Rank	Player	Team	GP	GW	GL	PCT
1	Jarmila Gajdošová	California Dream	106	60	46	.566
2	Madison Brengle	Washington Kastles	57	30	27	.526
3	Taylor Townsend	Philadelphia Freedoms	66	34	32	.515

Men's doubles

Rank	Player	Team	GP	GW	GL	PCT
1	Leander Paes	Washington Kastles	98	62	36	.633
2	Sam Querrey	Washington Kastles	65	39	26	.600
3	Alex Kuznetsov	Boston Lobsters	51	29	22	.569
4	Teymuraz Gabashvili	Austin Aces	112	59	53	.527
4	Jarmere Jenkins	Austin Aces	112	59	53	.527
6	Scott Lipsky	Boston Lobsters	116	59	57	.509

Women's doubles

Rank	Player	Team	GP	GW	GL	PCT
1	Anastasia Rodionova	Washington Kastles	97	59	38	.608
2	Madison Brengle	Washington Kastles	56	34	22	.607
3	Arantxa Parra Santonja	Boston Lobsters	100	57	43	.570
4	Irina Falconi	Boston Lobsters	105	57	48	.543
5	Nicole Gibbs	Austin Aces	77	41	36	.532
6	Alla Kudryavtseva	Austin Aces	96	50	46	.521

Mixed doubles

Rank	Player	Team	GP	GW	GL	PCT
1	Anabel Medina Garrigues	California Dream	91	57	34	.626
2	Neal Skupski	California Dream	80	46	34	.575
3	Alla Kudryavtseva	Austin Aces	103	59	44	.573
4	Taylor Townsend	Philadelphia Freedoms	85	48	37	.565
5	Teymuraz Gabashvili	Austin Aces	96	54	42	.563
6	Marcelo Melo	Philadelphia Freedoms	110	57	53	.518

== Individual honors ==
Award	Recipient	Team
Female Co-Most Valuable Players	Anabel Medina Garrigues	California Dream
Female Co-Most Valuable Players	Anastasia Rodionova	Washington Kastles
Male Most Valuable Player	Teymuraz Gabashvili	Austin Aces
Female Rookie of the Year	Alla Kudryavtseva	Austin Aces
Male Rookie of the Year	Neal Skupski	California Dream
Coach of the Year	Rick Leach	Austin Aces
WTT Final Most Valuable Player	Leander Paes	Washington Kastles

== Team statistics ==
The tables below show the regular-season winning percentages of each team in each of the league's five events. (Note: Tim Smyczek's statistics are not included in the team totals shown on WTT's website. The Boston Lobsters' men's singles and men's doubles statistics shown in this section have been corrected to include Smyczek as described in the article about the 2015 Lobsters season.)

Men's singles

Rank	Team	GP	GW	GL	PCT
1	Austin Aces	106	65	41	.613
2	Washington Kastles	104	58	46	.558
3	Philadelphia Freedoms	101	51	50	.505
4	California Dream	114	56	58	.491
5	San Diego Aviators	116	56	60	.483
6	Springfield Lasers	112	51	61	.455
7	Boston Lobsters	99	39	60	.394

Women's singles

Rank	Team	GP	GW	GL	PCT
1	California Dream	106	60	46	.566
2	Austin Aces	108	57	51	.528
3	Philadelphia Freedoms	100	52	48	.520
4	Washington Kastles	101	52	49	.515
5	San Diego Aviators	109	54	55	.495
6	Boston Lobsters	103	46	57	.447
7	Springfield Lasers	109	47	62	.431

Men's doubles

Rank	Team	GP	GW	GL	PCT
1	Washington Kastles	107	67	40	.626
2	Austin Aces	112	59	53	.527
3	Boston Lobsters	116	59	57	.509
4	Springfield Lasers	112	53	59	.473
5	California Dream	106	50	56	.472
6	Philadelphia Freedoms	107	48	59	.449
7	San Diego Aviators	108	48	60	.444

Women's doubles

Rank	Team	GP	GW	GL	PCT
1	Washington Kastles	97	59	38	.608
2	Boston Lobsters	105	57	48	.543
3	Austin Aces	96	50	46	.521
4	California Dream	112	56	56	.500
5	Philadelphia Freedoms	109	52	57	.477
6	Springfield Lasers	101	46	55	.455
7	San Diego Aviators	102	41	61	.402

Mixed doubles

Rank	Team	GP	GW	GL	PCT
1	California Dream	104	61	43	.587
2	Austin Aces	103	59	44	.573
3	Philadelphia Freedoms	110	57	53	.518
4	Washington Kastles	108	53	55	.491
5	Boston Lobsters	113	52	61	.460
6	San Diego Aviators	111	50	61	.450
7	Springfield Lasers	115	50	65	.435

== Television ==
The 2015 season was the second year of a four-year television rights contract between WTT and ESPN, Inc. The WTT Final was telecast live on ESPN2. ESPN3 streamed the conference championship matches along with one match each night during the regular season.

In a June 2, 2015 press release, WTT announced that the WTT Final would start at 11:30 am EDT on August 2, and would be streamed from the start by ESPN3. Live television coverage would begin on ESPN2 at 1:00 pm with the match already in progress. The start times for the conference championship matches would be 7:00 pm local time on Thursday July 30.

Four regular-season matches were nationally televised on the Tennis Channel as well as on regional sports networks Altitude Sports and Entertainment, Comcast SportsNet affiliates, Mediacom Connections and MSG. These matches were as follows:

- 7:00 pm CDT, Thursday, July 16: California Dream at Austin Aces
- 7:00 pm EDT, Tuesday, July 21: Boston Lobsters at Washington Kastles
- 7:30 pm PDT, Thursday, July 23: San Diego Aviators at California Dream
- 7:00 pm EDT, Tuesday, July 28: Boston Lobsters at Philadelphia Freedoms

Nationally televised matches were also streamed on ESPN3. In addition to the televised ones, the following regular-season matches were streamed exclusively on ESPN3:

- 7:00 pm PDT, Monday, July 13: Philadelphia Freedoms at San Diego Aviators
- 7:00 pm EDT, Tuesday, July 14: Austin Aces at Washington Kastles
- 7:00 pm EDT, Monday, July 20: Washington Kastles at Philadelphia Freedoms
- 7:00 pm CDT, Saturday, July 25: San Diego Aviators at Springfield Lasers
- 8:00 pm EDT, Sunday, July 26: California Dream at Philadelphia Freedoms
- 7:00 pm EDT, Monday, July 27: Philadelphia Freedoms at Boston Lobsters
- 7:00 pm PDT, Tuesday, July 28: Springfield Lasers at San Diego Aviators
- 7:00 pm EDT, Wednesday, July 29: Boston Lobsters at Washington Kastles

== Sponsorship ==
On December 8, 2014, WTT announced that its title-sponsorship agreement with Mylan N.V. was extended for two more years through the 2017 season. As part of its partnership with WTT, Mylan will continue to sponsor events at which children meet with WTT players and are introduced to tennis, charitable events and the Mylan Aces program which allows each team to select a local charity for which it can earn money donated by Mylan by recording the most aces in the league on a given day during the regular season.
