= Cooper Tennis Complex =

Tennis center in Springfield, Missouri, US

- Location of Cooper Tennis Complex marked in green on map of Greene County, Missouri with Springfield highlighted in red along with map showing location of Greene County within Missouri.

- Location within the United States
- Interactive map of Cooper Tennis Complex
- Type: Tennis complex
- Location: Springfield, Missouri
- Coordinates: 37°13′5″N 93°15′3″W
- Area: 25 acres (10.12 ha; 0.04 sq mi)
- Elevation: 1,360 feet (415 m)
- Opened: 1994
- Founder: Springfield-Greene County Parks Department
- Etymology: Named after Harry Cooper
- Operator: Springfield-Greene County Parks Board
- Open: October–March: Monday–Thursday 7:00 am–11:00 pm, Friday 7:00 am–10:00 pm, Saturday and Sunday 8:00 am–9:00 pm April–September: Monday–Thursday 7:00 am–10:00 pm, Friday 7:00 am–9:00 pm, Saturday and Sunday 8:00 am–9:00 pm
- Awards: 2000 United States Tennis Association Outstanding Facility Award; 2002 Municipal Facility of the Year by Tennis Industry Magazine; 2006 United States Tennis Association Missouri Valley Section Facility of the Year; 2016 United States Tennis Association Outstanding Facility Award
- Parking: 184 uncovered outdoor spaces
- Public transit: City Utilities of Springfield Bus: Line 10 and Line 22 at North Cedarbrook Avenue and East Pythian Street
- Website: www.parkboard.org/808/Cooper-Tennis-Complex

The Cooper Tennis Complex is a tennis center located in Springfield, Greene County, Missouri, with an entrance at 2331 East Pythian Street.

The complex opened in 1994. Mediacom Stadium, home of the Springfield Lasers of World TeamTennis since 1996, is located within the complex. The stadium has a seating capacity of 2,500 people. In addition to the stadium, the complex has 16 other outdoor lighted courts and 12 indoor courts. There are also a full-service pro shop offering racquet stringing and grip services, locker rooms with showers, a fitness room with exercise equipment and free weights, a conference room and a meeting area located on the complex grounds. Programs and lessons are available for all ages and skill levels.

The complex's tennis courts are available to the public for a fee. Discounted rates and, in some cases, free court time are available to those who hold annual or summer memberships.

In addition to being the home of the Springfield Lasers, the complex is also the home of the Missouri State Bears college tennis team and has hosted Fed Cup matches, Association of Tennis Professionals (ATP) and Women's Tennis Association (WTA) tournaments, the 1997 and 1998 NCAA Men's Division II and NCAA Women's Division II championships, national 12 and under championships, Missouri State High School Activities Association championships and various United States Tennis Association (USTA) programs.

== Awards ==
In 2000, the complex earned the USTA Outstanding Tennis Facility Award in the large facility category. Cooper Tennis Complex won the award again in 2016.

In 2002, Tennis Industry Magazine named the complex Municipal Facility of the Year.

In 2006, the complex was named Facility of the Year by the USTA Missouri Valley Section.
