= California Dream (tennis) =

American team tennis franchise

- Sport: Team tennis
- Founded: 1993 (moved to California on February 23, 2015)
- Folded: January 13, 2016
- League: World TeamTennis
- Conference: Western; 2000–2015
- Team history: Kansas City Explorers; 1993–2012; Texas Wild; 2013–2014; California Dream; 2015
- Based in: Citrus Heights, California
- Stadium: Dream Stadium at Sunrise Mall
- Colors
- Owner: Jeff Launius; Bob Kaliski; Michael Malone
- Head coach: David Macpherson
- Championships: 2010 King Trophy (as Kansas City Explorers)
- Website: www.californiadreamtennis.com

The California Dream was a WTT team that played at Dream Stadium at Sunrise Mall in Citrus Heights, California, in the United States. The team was founded in 1993, as the Kansas City Explorers. After 20 seasons in Kansas City, the team moved to Irving, Texas, for the 2013 season and was renamed the Texas Wild. On February 23, 2015, WTT announced that a new ownership group had taken control of the Wild and moved the team to California, renaming it the California Dream. In January 2016, the franchise was terminated by WTT due to noncompliance with the league. Prior to folding, the Dream was the oldest continuously operating franchise in WTT.

The franchise won its only King Trophy as WTT champions in 2010, as the Kansas City Explorers.

== Team history ==
The Kansas City Explorers were founded in 1993, and represented Kansas City in WTT for 20 seasons before moving to Irving, Texas, for the 2013 season. The Explorers were 2010 WTT Champions.

The Texas Wild were based in Irving for two seasons.

On February 23, 2015, WTT announced that a new ownership group had taken control of the Wild and moved the team to California, renaming it the California Dream.

Interim placeholder logo used when the franchise's move to California was announced

Upon the announcement of the franchise's move, WTT used a simple placeholder logo to represent the team on its website in lieu of the Wild logo.

Alternate logo of the California Dream

The new Dream logo was unveiled at the WTT draft on March 16, 2015. There are two basic versions. The version including an outline of a map of the state of California (shown above) is used on both the WTT and Dream websites. An alternate version without the map (shown at the left) is used by the Dream on its Facebook and Twitter accounts.
