= Austin Aces =

World TeamTennis team

- Founded: 2003 (moved to Austin in 2014)
- League: World TeamTennis
- Team history: Newport Beach Breakers; 2003–2011; Orange County Breakers; 2012–2013; Austin Aces; 2014–2015; Orange County Breakers; 2016–present
- Based in: Austin, Texas
- Stadium: Cedar Park Center
- Colors: Torch red, black, royal blue, electric lime and white
- Head coach: Rick Leach
- Mascot: Ace

The Austin Aces were a World TeamTennis (WTT) team in Austin, Texas, USA. The team was known as the Newport Beach Breakers from 2003 until the 2011 season and as the Orange County Breakers during 2012 and 2013, before moving to Texas for the 2014 and 2015 seasons.

On December 14, 2015, the Aces' owner Lorne Abony announced that the team had been unable to find a suitable permanent venue and would move back to Orange County, California for the 2016 season and be renamed the Orange County Breakers. The Aces officially reported their average home attendance in 2014, as 2,155. However, general manager Allen Hardison said that the real figure may have been closer to 1,300. In 2015, the average attendance was approximately 950, even though the first 1,000 fans at the gates for the Western Conference Championship Match who had an online code were admitted for free. Hardison was complimentary of the staffs at both Cedar Park Center and Gregory Gymnasium, and he also noted that the fans who supported the Aces were "some of the best in the league." Hardison said that in order for a WTT franchise to survive, it has to have a venue that meets established criteria for location, venue type and availability, and that ideally offers an outdoor setting. Although the team's new home court was not immediately announced, officials with a desirable venue in Orange County had reportedly reached out to the Aces to lure them back.

== 2015 squad ==
- (United States) Rick Leach, Head Coach
- (United States) Nicole Gibbs
- (Russia) Alla Kudryavtseva
- (United States) Jarmere Jenkins
- (United States) Andy Roddick
- (Russia) Teymuraz Gabashvili

== 2014 Squad ==
- (United Kingdom) John Lloyd, Head Coach
- (France) Marion Bartoli
- (Czech Republic) Eva Hrdinová
- (Philippines) Treat Conrad Huey
- (United States) Andy Roddick
- (Russia) Vera Zvonareva

== 2014 season ==
- July 7 – @ San Diego Aviators – 7:00 PM (SD – Daniela Hantuchová, AUS – Andy Roddick)
- July 8 – host Springfield Lasers – 7:30 PM – (AUS – Andy Roddick, Marion Bartoli)
- July 9 – host San Diego Aviators – 7:30 PM (SD – Daniela Hantuchová, AUS – Andy Roddick, Marion Bartoli)
- July 11 – host Washington Kastles – 7:30 PM (WAS – Martina Hingis, AUS – Andy Roddick, Marion Bartoli)
- July 12 – host Philadelphia Freedoms – 7:30 PM (AUS – Andy Roddick, Marion Bartoli)
- July 13 – @ Springfield Lasers – 7:00 PM (SPR – James Blake, AUS – Andy Roddick)
- July 14 – host Boston Lobsters – 7:30 PM (AUS – Andy Roddick, Marion Bartoli)
- July 15 – @ Boston Lobsters – 7:00 PM
- July 17 – @ Texas Wild – 7:30 PM
- July 18 – host Texas Wild – 7:30 PM (AUS Andy Roddick, Marion Bartoli)
- July 19 – host San Diego Aviators – 1:00 PM (SD – Daniela Hantuchová, AUS – Andy Roddick, Marion Bartoli)
- July 20 – @ Texas Wild – 7:30 PM
- July 21 – @ Philadelphia Freedoms – 7:00 PM (AUS – Andy Roddick)
- July 23 – @ San Diego Aviators – 7:00 PM (SD – Bob Bryan, Mike Bryan, Daniela Hantuchová)

== See also ==
- World TeamTennis
- Orange County Breakers
