= 2014 Philadelphia Freedoms season =

- Conference: 2nd Eastern

Record
- 2014 record: 9 wins, 5 losses
- Home record: 6 wins, 1 loss
- Road record: 3 wins, 4 losses
- Games won–lost: 284–254

Team info
- Owner(s): Billie Jean King
- General manager: Barbara Perry
- Coach: Josh Cohen
- Stadium: The Pavilion (capacity: 3,500)

The 2014 Philadelphia Freedoms season was the 14th season of the franchise (in its current incarnation) in World TeamTennis (WTT).

The Freedoms had 9 wins and 5 losses and finished second in the Eastern Conference. They qualified for the playoffs for the first time since 2007, losing to the Washington Kastles in the Eastern Conference Championship Match. The Freedoms were led by WTT rookie Marcelo Melo who was named WTT Male Most Valuable Player.

== Season recap ==
=== James Blake trade ===
James Blake was selected by the Freedoms in the 2012 marque player draft and played for the team that season. Blake did not register for the 2013 marquee player draft, but he signed with the New York Sportimes as a wildcard player. Since WTT teams are permitted to have only one wildcard player of each gender, Blake was effectively released by the Sportimes when John McEnroe was designated as the team's male wildcard player on July 18, 2013. Consequently, the right to protect Blake, should he register as an eligible marquee player, remained with the Freedoms under WTT rules. On February 11, 2014, WTT announced that the Boston Lobsters had traded Blake to the Springfield Lasers for undisclosed consideration. Therefore, an apparent unreported trade which sent Blake to Boston took place between the Freedoms and the Lobsters between the end of the 2012 season and the 2014 marquee player draft.

=== Drafts ===
Since the Freedoms had the second-worst record in WTT in 2013, they had the second selection in each round of both drafts. The Freedoms chose Victoria Azarenka in the first round of the Marquee Player Draft and chose not to protect Sloane Stephens. They passed on making a second-round pick. At the Roster Player Draft, the Freedoms protected Victoria Duval and Liezel Huber and picked WTT rookies Frank Dancevic and Marcelo Melo.

=== Duval misses the season and is replaced by Townsend ===
On July 4, 2014, the Freedoms announced that Victoria Duval would miss the entire season, because she had recently been diagnosed with Hodgkin's lymphoma. As a show of support for Duval, the Freedoms wore special patches with her initials on them on their uniforms during the 2014 season. The following day, the Freedoms announced that they had signed Taylor Townsend to replace Duval.

=== Six road matches to start the season ===
The Freedoms started the 2014 season with six road matches. In the season opener against the Springfield Lasers, the Freedoms fell behind, 10–6, after two sets and trailed 16–14 heading to the final set. Taylor Townsend earned a 5–4 set win in women's singles to send the match to overtime with the Freedoms still behind, 20–19. Townsend then won the first game of overtime to tie the score at 20 and force a super tiebreaker which she won, 7–3.

After three straight losses, the Freedoms cruised to a dominant victory over the Austin Aces, 25–11, winning all five sets. Frank Dancevic took a set from Andy Roddick, 5–3, in men's singles and teamed with Marcelo Melo for a 5–3 set win over Roddick and Treat Huey in men's doubles. Townsend won the women's singles set, 5–2, over Vera Zvonareva and partnered with Liezel Huber for a 5–2 set win in women's doubles. Huber and Melo won the mixed doubles set, 5–1.

The Freedoms lost the following match, 23–14, to the three-time defending champion Washington Kastles. With the season less than half finished, it was already the second time the Freedoms had visited Washington; they lost both matches. This defeat dropped the Freedoms' record to 2 wins and 4 losses.

=== Winning streak and a playoff berth ===
The Freedoms faced the San Diego Aviators in their home opener at The Pavilion on the campus of Villanova University on July 15, 2014, as Victoria Azarenka made her debut with the team. It was the first of four straight home matches on four consecutive evenings. After falling behind 10–4 after two sets, the Freedoms got set wins from Frank Dancevic (5–2 in men's singles), Azarenka (5–3 in women's singles) and Azarenka and Marcelo Melo (5–3 in mixed doubles) to earn a 19–18 victory.

The following evening, the Freedoms lost both singles sets but won all three doubles sets on their way to a 21–18 victory over the Springfield Lasers. Liezel Huber and Melo closed out the match with a 5–3 mixed doubles set win.

On July 17, 2014, the Freedoms faced the Washington Kastles. After Huber and Melo won he opening set of mixed doubles, 5–3, over Venus Williams and Leander Paes, Taylor Townsend took the first three games of the women's singles set from Williams. The Kastles substituted Anastasia Rodionova for Williams, but Townsend continued her dominance, winning the set, 5–0. Dancevic extended the Freedoms' lead to 15–5 at halftime with a 5–2 set win in men's singles. The Kastles won the women's doubles and men's doubles sets to send the match to overtime with the Freedoms holding a 21–15 lead. dancevic and Melo won the first game of overtime to give the Freedoms a 22–15 victory.

In the final match of the homestand, the Freedom won all five sets in a dominant 25–14 win over the Boston Lobsters. Dancevic, Huber, Melo and Townsend were each involved in two set wins. With their fourth straight win, the Freedoms swept their homestand and improved their record to 6 wins and 4 losses.

While enjoying a day off on July 19, 2014, the Freedoms clinched a playoff berth when the Kastles defeated the Lobsters, 23–9.

The Freedoms won their fifth straight match on July 20, 2014, when they beat the Lobsters on the road, 23–21. Dancevic started off the match with a 5–4 set win over John Isner. Huber and Townsend followed with a 5–4 women's doubles set win. Heber and Melo took the mixed doubles set to give the Freedoms a 15–12 halftime lead. After the Lobsters cut the lead to 18–17, Dancevic and Melo took the mn's doubles set, 5–4, to close out the victory.

=== End of the regular season ===
After their only home loss of the season (21–18 to the Austin Aces) ended their winning streak, the Freedoms responded with their most lopsided win of the season, a 25–6 drubbing of the Boston Lobsters. It was the third time during the 2014 season that the Freedoms had won all five sets in a match and the second time they had done it to the Lobsters. Taylor Townsend had a 5–0 set win in women's singles and teamed with Liezel Huber for another 5–0 set win in women's doubles.

With the Washington Kastles having clinched home-court advantage for the Eastern Conference Championship Match the previous evening, some of the drama was taken out of the Freedoms' regular-season finale. In a playoff preview, the Kastles won the first two sets to take a 10–5 lead and held an 18–13 advantage after four sets. In the final mixed doubles set Liezel Huber and Marcelo Melo topped Martina Hingis and Leander Paes, 5–2, to send the match to overtime with the Kastles clinging to a 20–18 lead. Huber and Melo won two games in overtime to send the match to a super tiebreaker which they won, 7–4, to give the Freedoms a 21–20 victory. The win gave the Freedoms 9 wins and 5 losses on the season, just one match behind the Kastles in the Eastern Conference standings.

=== Playoffs ===
The Freedoms met the Washington Kastles in the Eastern Conference Championship Match on July 24, 2014, in Washington. Taylor Townsend's 5–2 set win in women's singles over Martina Hingis gave the Freedoms an 8–7 lead after two sets. The Kastles won the next two sets to take a 17–11 advantage to the final set. In a bizarre scene during the fourth set of women's doubles, Liezel Huber was struck in the back of the head by a Townsend forehand shot. Huber was unable to continue. She was diagnosed with a concussion, taken to the hospital and later released. With no substitute available, Townsend was left to finish the set alone. Playing two against one, Townsend was not permitted to return serves on Huber's side and dropped the set, 5–1. Frank Dancevic and Marcelo Melo won the men's doubles set, 5–3, to send the match to overtime with the Kastles leading, 20–16. The Kastles won the first game of overtime to earn a 21–16 victory and end the season for the Freedoms.

== Event chronology ==
- February 11, 2014: The Freedoms selected Victoria Azarenka in the WTT Marquee Player Draft.
- March 11, 2014: The Freedoms protected Victoria Duval and Liezel Huber and selected Marcelo Melo and Frank Dancevic in the WTT Roster Player Draft.
- July 5, 2014: The Freedoms signed Taylor Townsend.
- July 19, 2014: With a record of 6 wins and 4 losses, the Freedoms clinched a playoff berth when the Washington Kastles defeated the Boston Lobsters, 23–9.
- July 24, 2014: The Freedoms lost the Eastern Conference Championship Match to the Washington Kastles, 21–16, in overtime.

== Draft picks ==
Since the Freedoms had the league's second-worst record in 2013, they had the second selection in each round of both WTT drafts.

=== Marquee player draft ===
The Freedoms did not protect Sloane Stephens effectively making her a free agent. The selections made by the Freedoms are shown in the table below.

| Round | No. | Overall | Player chosen | Prot? |
|---|---|---|---|---|
| 1 | 2 | 2 | Victoria Azarenka | N |
| 2 | 2 | 10 | Pass | – |

=== Roster player draft ===
The Freedoms protected two players from their 2013 team: Victoria Duval and Liezel Huber. They drafted WTT rookies Frank Dancevic and Marcelo Melo. The selections made by the Freedoms are shown in the table below.

| Round | No. | Overall | Player chosen | Prot? |
|---|---|---|---|---|
| 1 | 2 | 2 | Victoria Duval | Y |
| 2 | 2 | 9 | Liezel Huber | Y |
| 3 | 2 | 16 | Marcelo Melo | N |
| 4 | 2 | 23 | Frank Dancevic | N |

== Match log ==
=== Regular season ===
Legend
| Freedoms Win | Freedoms Loss |
Home team in CAPS

| Match | Date | Venue and location | Result and details | Record |
|---|---|---|---|---|
| 1 | July 6 | Mediacom Stadium at Cooper Tennis Complex; Springfield, Missouri | Philadelphia Freedoms 21, SPRINGFIELD LASERS 20 (super tiebreaker, 7–3) * MD: Ross Hutchins/Michael Russell (Lasers) 5, Frank Dancevic/Marcelo Melo (Freedoms) 3 * WD: Olga Govortsova/Anna-Lena Grönefeld (Lasers) 5, Liezel Huber/Taylor Townsend (Freedoms) 3 * XD: Liezel Huber/Marcelo Melo (Freedoms) 5, Anna-Lena Grönefeld/Ross Hutchins (Lasers) 1 *** Anna-Lena Grönefeld substituted for Olga Govortsova at 0–2 * MS: Michael Russell (Lasers) 5, Frank Dancevic (Freedoms) 3 * WS: Taylor Townsend (Freedoms) 5, Olga Govortsova (Lasers) 4 * OT - WS: Taylor Townsend (Freedoms) 1, Olga Govortsova (Lasers) 0 * STB - WS: Taylor Townsend (Freedoms) 7, Olga Govortsova (Lasers) 3 | 1–0 |
| 2 | July 8 | Valley View Casino Center; San Diego, California | SAN DIEGO AVIATORS 20, Philadelphia Freedoms 19 (super tiebreaker, 7–1) * MS: Somdev Devvarman (Aviators) 5, Frank Dancevic (Freedoms) 2 * WS: Taylor Townsend (Freedoms) 5, Daniela Hantuchová (Aviators) 2 * XD: Marcelo Melo/Liezel Huber (Freedoms) 5, Raven Klaasen/Květa Peschke (Aviators) 4 * WD: Květa Peschke/Daniela Hantuchová (Aviators) 5, Liezel Huber/Taylor Townsend (Freedoms) 1 * MD: Frank Dancevic/Marcelo Melo (Freedoms) 5, Raven Klaasen/Somdev Devvarman (Aviators) 3 * OT – MD: Frank Dancevic/Marcelo Melo (Freedoms) 1, Raven Klaasen/Somdev Devvarman (Aviators) 0 * STB – MD: Raven Klaasen/Somdev Devvarman (Aviators) 7, Frank Dancevic/Marcelo Melo (Freedoms) 1 | 1–1 |
| 3 | July 10 | Kastles Stadium at the Charles E. Smith Center; Washington, District of Columbia | WASHINGTON KASTLES 25, Philadelphia Freedoms 10 * MS: Kevin Anderson (Kastles) 5, Frank Dancevic (Freedoms) 2 * WD: Martina Hingis/Anastasia Rodionova (Kastles) 5, Liezel Huber/Taylor Townsend (Freedoms) 2 * MD: Leander Paes/Bobby Reynolds (Kastles) 5, Frank Dancevic/Marcelo Melo (Freedoms) 3 * WS: Martina Hingis (Kastles) 5, Taylor Townsend (Freedoms) 0 * XD: Martina Hingis/Leander Paes (Kastles) 5, Liezel Huber/Marcelo Melo (Freedoms) 3 *** Leander Paes substituted for Kevin Anderson at 1–0 | 1–2 |
| 4 | July 11 | Four Seasons Resort and Club Dallas at Las Colinas; Irving, Texas | TEXAS WILD 22, Philadelphia Freedoms 21 (super tiebreaker, 7–1) * XD: Liezel Huber/Marcelo Melo (Freedoms) 5, Anabel Medina Garrigues/Aisam Qureshi (Wild) 3 * MS: Alex Bogomolov, Jr. (Wild) 5, Frank Dancevic (Freedoms) 4 * WD: Darija Jurak/Anabel Medina Garrigues (Wild) 5, Liezel Huber/Taylor Townsend (Freedoms) 4 * WS: Taylor Townsend (Freedoms) 5, Anabel Medina Garrigues (Wild) 3 * MD: Alex Bogomolov, Jr./Aisam Qureshi (Wild) 5, Frank Dancevic/Marcelo Melo (Freedoms) 3 * STB – MD: Alex Bogomolov, Jr./Aisam Qureshi (Wild) 7, Frank Dancevic/Marcelo Melo (Freedoms) 1 | 1–3 |
| 5 | July 12 | Cedar Park Center; Cedar Park, Texas | Philadelphia Freedoms 25, AUSTIN ACES 11 * MD: Frank Dancevic/Marcelo Melo (Freedoms) 5, Treat Huey/Andy Roddick (Aces) 3 * MS: Frank Dancevic (Freedoms) 5, Andy Roddick (Aces) 3 * XD: Liezel Huber/Marcelo Melo (Freedoms) 5, Marion Bartoli/Treat Huey (Aces) 1 *** Treat Huey substituted for Andy Roddick at 1–0 * WD: Liezel Huber/Taylor Townsend (Freedoms) 5, Eva Hrdinová/Vera Zvonareva (Aces) 2 * WS: Taylor Townsend (Freedoms) 5, Vera Zvonareva (Aces) 2 | 2–3 |
| 6 | July 13 | Kastles Stadium at the Charles E. Smith Center; Washington, District of Columbia | WASHINGTON KASTLES 23, Philadelphia Freedoms 14 * MS: Bobby Reynolds (Kastles) 5, Frank Dancevic (Freedoms) 1 * WD: Martina Hingis/Anastasia Rodionova (Kastles) 5, Liezel Huber/Taylor Townsend (Freedoms) 3 * MD: Frank Dancevic/Marcelo Melo (Freedoms) 5, Leander Paes/Bobby Reynolds (Kastles) 3 * WS: Martina Hingis (Kastles) 5, Taylor Townsend (Freedoms) 1 * XD: Martina Hingis/Leander Paes (Kastles) 5, Liezel Huber/Marcelo Melo (Freedoms) 4 | 2–4 |
| 7 | July 15 | The Pavilion; Radnor Township, Pennsylvania | PHILADELPHIA FREEDOMS 19, San Diego Aviators 18 * MD: Somdev Devvarman/Raven Klaasen (Aviators) 5, Frank Dancevic/Marcelo Melo (Freedoms) 3 * WD: Daniela Hantuchová/Květa Peschke (Aviators) 5, Victoria Azarenka/Liezel Huber (Freedoms) 1 * MS: Frank Dancevic (Freedoms) 5, Somdev Devvarman (Aviators) 2 * WS: Victoria Azarenka (Freedoms) 5, Daniela Hantuchová (Aviators) 3 * XD: Victoria Azarenka/Marcelo Melo (Freedoms) 5, Květa Peschke/Raven Klaasen (Aviators) 3 | 3–4 |
| 8 | July 16 | The Pavilion; Radnor Township, Pennsylvania | PHILADELPHIA FREEDOMS 21, Springfield Lasers 18 * MS: Michael Russell (Lasers) 5, Frank Dancevic (Freedoms) 4 * WD: Liezel Huber/Taylor Townsend (Freedoms) 5, Olga Govortsova/Raquel Kops-Jones (Lasers) 3 * MD: Frank Dancevic/Marcelo Melo (Freedoms) 5, Ross Hutchins/Michael Russell (Lasers) 2 * WS: Olga Govortsova (Lasers) 5, Taylor Townsend (Freedoms) 2 * XD: Liezel Huber/Marcelo Melo (Freedoms) 5, Raquel Kops-Jones/Ross Hutchins (Lasers) 3 | 4–4 |
| 9 | July 17 | The Pavilion; Radnor Township, Pennsylvania | PHILADELPHIA FREEDOMS 22, Washington Kastles 15 (overtime) * XD: Liezel Huber/Marcelo Melo (Freedoms) 5, Venus Williams/Leander Paes (Kastles) 3 * WS: Taylor Townsend (Freedoms) 5, Anastasia Rodionova (Kastles) 0 *** Anastasia Rodionova substituted for Venus Williams at 0–3 * MS: Frank Dancevic (Freedoms) 5, Bobby Reynolds (Kastles) 2 * WD: Anastasia Rodionova/Venus Williams (Kastles) 5, Liezel Huber/Taylor Townsend (Freedoms) 3 * MD: Leander Paes/Bobby Reynolds (Kastles) 5, Frank Dancevic/Marcelo Melo (Freedoms) 3 * OT – MD: Frank Dancevic/Marcelo Melo (Freedoms) 1, Leander Paes/Bobby Reynolds (Kastles) 0 | 5–4 |
| 10 | July 18 | The Pavilion; Radnor Township, Pennsylvania | PHILADELPHIA FREEDOMS 25, Boston Lobsters 14 * MS: Frank Dancevic (Freedoms) 5, Rik de Voest (Lobsters) 4 * WD: Liezel Huber/Taylor Townsend (Freedoms) 5, Sharon Fichman/Megan Moulton-Levy (Lobsters) 2 * XD: Liezel Huber/Marcelo Melo (Freedoms) 5, Megan Moulton-Levy/Scott Lipsky (Lobsters) 2 * WS: Taylor Townsend (Freedoms) 5, Sharon Fichman (Lobsters) 2 * MD: Frank Dancevic/Marcelo Melo (Freedoms) 5, Rik de Voest/Scott Lipsky (Lobsters) 4 | 6–4 |
| 11 | July 20 | Boston Lobsters Tennis Center at the Manchester Athletic Club; Manchester-by-the-Sea, Massachusetts | Philadelphia Freedoms 23, BOSTON LOBSTERS 21 * MS: Frank Dancevic (Freedoms) 5, John Isner (Lobsters) 4 * WD: Liezel Huber/Taylor Townsend (Freedoms) 5, Sharon Fichman/Megan Moulton-Levy (Lobsters) 4 * XD: Liezel Huber/Marcelo Melo (Freedoms) 5, Sharon Fichman/John Isner (Lobsters) 4 *** Sharon Fichman substituted for Megan Moulton-Levy at 2–3 * WS: Sharon Fichman (Lobsters) 5, Taylor Townsend (Freedoms) 3 * MD: Frank Dancevic/Marcelo Melo (Freedoms) 5, Rik de Voest/John Isner (Lobsters) 4 | 7–4 |
| 12 | July 21 | The Pavilion; Radnor Township, Pennsylvania | Austin Aces 21, PHILADELPHIA FREEDOMS 18 * MS: Frank Dancevic (Freedoms) 5, Andy Roddick (Aces) 4 * WS: Varvara Lepchenko (Aces) 5, Taylor Townsend (Freedoms) 2 * XD: Eva Hrdinová/Treat Huey (Aces) 5, Liezel Huber/Marcelo Melo (Freedoms) 3 * WD: Liezel Huber/Taylor Townsend (Freedoms) 5, Eva Hrdinová/Varvara Lepchenko (Aces) 2 * MD: Treat Huey/Andy Roddick (Aces) 5, Frank Dancevic/Marcelo Melo (Freedoms) 3 | 7–5 |
| 13 | July 22 | The Pavilion; Radnor Township, Pennsylvania | PHILADELPHIA FREEDOMS 25, Boston Lobsters 6 * MS: Frank Dancevic (Freedoms) 5, Rik de Voest (Lobsters) 3 * WS: Taylor Townsend (Freedoms) 5, Julia Cohen (Lobsters) 0 * MD: Frank Dancevic/Marcelo Melo (Freedoms) 5, Rik de Voest/James Cerretani (Lobsters) 2 * WD: Liezel Huber/Taylor Townsend (Freedoms) 5, Julia Cohen/Megan Moulton-Levy (Lobsters) 0 * XD: Liezel Huber/Marcelo Melo (Freedoms) 5, Megan Moulton-Levy/James Cerretani (Lobsters) 1 | 8–5 |
| 14 | July 23 | The Pavilion; Radnor Township, Pennsylvania | PHILADELPHIA FREEDOMS 21, Washington Kastles 20 (super tiebreaker, 7–4) * MS:Bobby Reynolds (Kastles) 5, Frank Dancevic (Freedoms) 3 * WS: Martina Hingis (Kastles) 5, Taylor Townsend (Freedoms) 2 * MD: Frank Dancevic/Marcelo Melo (Freedoms) 5, Leander Paes/Bobby Reynolds (Kastles) 3 * WD: Martina Hingis/Anastasia Rodionova (Kastles) 5, Liezel Huber/Taylor Townsend (Freedoms) 3 * XD: Liezel Huber/Marcelo Melo (Freedoms) 5, Martina Hingis/Leander Paes (Kastles) 2 * OT – XD: Liezel Huber/Marcelo Melo (Freedoms) 2, Martina Hingis/Leander Paes (Kastles) 0 * STB – XD: Liezel Huber/Marcelo Melo (Freedoms) 7, Martina Hingis/Leander Paes (Kastles) 4 | 9–5 |

=== Playoffs ===
Legend
| Freedoms Win | Freedoms Loss |
Home team in CAPS

Eastern Conference Championship Match

| Date | Venue and location | Result and details |
|---|---|---|
| July 24 | Kastles Stadium at the Charles E. Smith Center; Washington, District of Columbia | WASHINGTON KASTLES 21, Philadelphia Freedoms 16 (overtime) * MS: Bobby Reynolds (Kastles) 5, Frank Dancevic (Freedoms) 3 * WS: Taylor Townsend (Freedoms) 5, Martina Hingis (Kastles) 2 * XD: Martina Hingis/Leander Paes (Kastles) 5, Liezel Huber/Marcelo Melo (Freedoms) 2 * WD: Martina Hingis/Anastasia Rodionova (Kastles) 5, Liezel Huber/Taylor Townsend (Freedoms) 1 * MD: Frank Dancevic/Marcelo Melo (Freedoms) 5, Leander Paes/Bobby Reynolds (Kastles) 3 * OT – MD: Leander Paes/Bobby Reynolds (Kastles) 1, Frank Dancevic/Marcelo Melo (Freedoms) 0 |

== Team personnel ==
=== On-court personnel ===
- (United States) Josh Cohen – Head Coach
- (Belarus) Victoria Azarenka
- (Canada) Frank Dancevic
- (United States) Victoria Duval (did not play due to illness) (Note: Roster player who appeared in fewer than three matches due to injury and was eligible to be protected in the draft the following year because of WTT's injury exception.)
- (United States) Liezel Huber
- (Brazil) Marcelo Melo
- (United States) Taylor Townsend

=== Front office ===
- Billie Jean King – Owner
- Barbara Perry – General Manager

== Statistics ==
Players are listed in order of their game-winning percentage provided they played in at least 40% of the Freedoms' games in that event, which is the WTT minimum for qualification for league leaders in individual statistical categories.

Men's singles – regular season

| Player | GP | GW | GL | PCT | A | DF | BPW | BPP | BP% | 3APW | 3APP | 3AP% |
|---|---|---|---|---|---|---|---|---|---|---|---|---|
| Frank Dancevic | 111 | 54 | 57 | .486 | 40 | 6 | 11 | 25 | .440 | 7 | 17 | .412 |
| Total | 111 | 54 | 57 | .486 | 40 | 6 | 11 | 25 | .440 | 7 | 17 | .412 |

Women's singles – regular season

| Player | GP | GW | GL | PCT | A | DF | BPW | BPP | BP% | 3APW | 3APP | 3AP% |
|---|---|---|---|---|---|---|---|---|---|---|---|---|
| Taylor Townsend | 90 | 47 | 43 | .522 | 9 | 21 | 18 | 31 | .581 | 8 | 20 | .400 |
| Victoria Azarenka | 8 | 5 | 3 | .625 | 1 | 2 | 2 | 3 | .667 | 2 | 3 | .667 |
| Total | 98 | 52 | 46 | .531 | 10 | 23 | 20 | 34 | .588 | 10 | 23 | .435 |

Men's doubles – regular season

| Player | GP | GW | GL | PCT | A | DF | BPW | BPP | BP% | 3APW | 3APP | 3AP% |
|---|---|---|---|---|---|---|---|---|---|---|---|---|
| Frank Dancevic | 116 | 60 | 56 | .517 | 12 | 5 | 13 | 30 | .433 | 22 | 36 | .611 |
| Marcelo Melo | 116 | 60 | 56 | .517 | 4 | 5 | 13 | 30 | .433 | 22 | 36 | .611 |
| Total | 116 | 60 | 56 | .517 | 16 | 10 | 13 | 30 | .433 | 22 | 36 | .611 |

Women's doubles – regular season

| Player | GP | GW | GL | PCT | A | DF | BPW | BPP | BP% | 3APW | 3APP | 3AP% |
|---|---|---|---|---|---|---|---|---|---|---|---|---|
| Taylor Townsend | 97 | 49 | 48 | .505 | 7 | 11 | 15 | 37 | .405 | 7 | 22 | .318 |
| Liezel Huber | 103 | 50 | 53 | .485 | 3 | 7 | 16 | 39 | .410 | 8 | 25 | .320 |
| Victoria Azarenka | 6 | 1 | 5 | .167 | 0 | 1 | 1 | 2 | .500 | 1 | 3 | .333 |
| Total | 103 | 50 | 53 | .485 | 10 | 19 | 16 | 39 | .410 | 8 | 25 | .320 |

Mixed doubles – regular season

| Player | GP | GW | GL | PCT | A | DF | BPW | BPP | BP% | 3APW | 3APP | 3AP% |
|---|---|---|---|---|---|---|---|---|---|---|---|---|
| Marcelo Melo | 110 | 68 | 42 | .618 | 8 | 3 | 23 | 47 | .489 | 15 | 27 | .556 |
| Liezel Huber | 102 | 63 | 39 | .618 | 1 | 12 | 21 | 43 | .488 | 13 | 25 | .520 |
| Victoria Azarenka | 8 | 5 | 3 | .625 | 0 | 1 | 2 | 4 | .500 | 2 | 2 | 1.000 |
| Total | 110 | 68 | 42 | .618 | 9 | 16 | 23 | 47 | .489 | 15 | 27 | .556 |

Team totals – regular season

| Event | GP | GW | GL | PCT | A | DF | BPW | BPP | BP% | 3APW | 3APP | 3AP% |
|---|---|---|---|---|---|---|---|---|---|---|---|---|
| Men's singles | 111 | 54 | 57 | .486 | 40 | 6 | 11 | 25 | .440 | 7 | 17 | .412 |
| Women's singles | 98 | 52 | 46 | .531 | 10 | 23 | 20 | 34 | .588 | 10 | 23 | .435 |
| Men's doubles | 116 | 60 | 56 | .517 | 16 | 10 | 13 | 30 | .433 | 22 | 36 | .611 |
| Women's doubles | 103 | 50 | 53 | .485 | 10 | 19 | 16 | 39 | .410 | 8 | 25 | .320 |
| Mixed doubles | 110 | 68 | 42 | .618 | 9 | 16 | 23 | 47 | .489 | 15 | 27 | .556 |
| Total | 538 | 284 | 254 | .528 | 85 | 74 | 83 | 175 | .474 | 62 | 128 | .484 |

Men's singles – playoffs

| Player | GP | GW | GL | PCT | A | DF | BPW | BPP | BP% | 3APW | 3APP | 3AP% |
|---|---|---|---|---|---|---|---|---|---|---|---|---|
| Frank Dancevic | 8 | 3 | 5 | .375 | 1 | 1 | 1 | 3 | .333 | 2 | 3 | .667 |
| Total | 8 | 3 | 5 | .375 | 1 | 1 | 1 | 3 | .333 | 2 | 3 | .667 |

Women's singles – playoffs

| Player | GP | GW | GL | PCT | A | DF | BPW | BPP | BP% | 3APW | 3APP | 3AP% |
|---|---|---|---|---|---|---|---|---|---|---|---|---|
| Taylor Townsend | 7 | 5 | 2 | .714 | 1 | 1 | 2 | 3 | .667 | 3 | 3 | 1.000 |
| Total | 7 | 5 | 2 | .714 | 1 | 1 | 2 | 3 | .667 | 3 | 3 | 1.000 |

Men's doubles – playoffs

| Player | GP | GW | GL | PCT | A | DF | BPW | BPP | BP% | 3APW | 3APP | 3AP% |
|---|---|---|---|---|---|---|---|---|---|---|---|---|
| Frank Dancevic | 9 | 5 | 4 | .556 | 1 | 0 | 1 | 1 | 1.000 | 0 | 0 | – |
| Marcelo Melo | 9 | 5 | 4 | .556 | 0 | 0 | 1 | 1 | 1.000 | 0 | 0 | – |
| Total | 9 | 5 | 4 | .556 | 1 | 0 | 1 | 1 | 1.000 | 0 | 0 | – |

Women's doubles – playoffs

| Player | GP | GW | GL | PCT | A | DF | BPW | BPP | BP% | 3APW | 3APP | 3AP% |
|---|---|---|---|---|---|---|---|---|---|---|---|---|
| Liezel Huber | 6 | 1 | 5 | .167 | 0 | 0 | 0 | 0 | – | 0 | 1 | .000 |
| Taylor Townsend | 6 | 1 | 5 | .167 | 0 | 1 | 0 | 0 | – | 0 | 1 | .000 |
| Total | 6 | 1 | 5 | .167 | 0 | 1 | 0 | 0 | – | 0 | 1 | .000 |

Mixed doubles – playoffs

| Player | GP | GW | GL | PCT | A | DF | BPW | BPP | BP% | 3APW | 3APP | 3AP% |
|---|---|---|---|---|---|---|---|---|---|---|---|---|
| Liezel Huber | 7 | 2 | 5 | .286 | 0 | 1 | 0 | 2 | .000 | 0 | 2 | .000 |
| Marcelo Melo | 7 | 2 | 5 | .286 | 1 | 0 | 0 | 2 | .000 | 0 | 2 | .000 |
| Total | 7 | 2 | 5 | .286 | 1 | 1 | 0 | 2 | .000 | 0 | 2 | .000 |

Team totals – playoffs

| Event | GP | GW | GL | PCT | A | DF | BPW | BPP | BP% | 3APW | 3APP | 3AP% |
|---|---|---|---|---|---|---|---|---|---|---|---|---|
| Men's singles | 8 | 3 | 5 | .375 | 1 | 1 | 1 | 3 | .333 | 2 | 3 | .667 |
| Women's singles | 7 | 5 | 2 | .714 | 1 | 1 | 2 | 3 | .667 | 3 | 3 | 1.000 |
| Men's doubles | 9 | 5 | 4 | .556 | 1 | 0 | 1 | 1 | 1.000 | 0 | 0 | – |
| Women's doubles | 6 | 1 | 5 | .167 | 0 | 1 | 0 | 0 | – | 0 | 1 | .000 |
| Mixed doubles | 7 | 2 | 5 | .286 | 1 | 1 | 0 | 2 | .000 | 0 | 2 | .000 |
| Total | 37 | 16 | 21 | .432 | 4 | 4 | 4 | 9 | .444 | 5 | 9 | .484 |

Men's singles – all matches

| Player | GP | GW | GL | PCT | A | DF | BPW | BPP | BP% | 3APW | 3APP | 3AP% |
|---|---|---|---|---|---|---|---|---|---|---|---|---|
| Frank Dancevic | 119 | 57 | 62 | .479 | 41 | 7 | 12 | 28 | .429 | 9 | 20 | .450 |
| Total | 119 | 57 | 62 | .479 | 41 | 7 | 12 | 28 | .429 | 9 | 20 | .450 |

Women's singles – all matches

| Player | GP | GW | GL | PCT | A | DF | BPW | BPP | BP% | 3APW | 3APP | 3AP% |
|---|---|---|---|---|---|---|---|---|---|---|---|---|
| Taylor Townsend | 97 | 52 | 45 | .536 | 10 | 22 | 20 | 34 | .588 | 11 | 23 | .478 |
| Victoria Azarenka | 8 | 5 | 3 | .625 | 1 | 2 | 2 | 3 | .667 | 2 | 3 | .667 |
| Total | 105 | 57 | 48 | .543 | 11 | 24 | 22 | 37 | .595 | 13 | 26 | .500 |

Men's doubles – all matches

| Player | GP | GW | GL | PCT | A | DF | BPW | BPP | BP% | 3APW | 3APP | 3AP% |
|---|---|---|---|---|---|---|---|---|---|---|---|---|
| Frank Dancevic | 125 | 65 | 60 | .520 | 13 | 5 | 14 | 31 | .452 | 22 | 36 | .611 |
| Marcelo Melo | 125 | 65 | 60 | .520 | 4 | 5 | 14 | 31 | .452 | 22 | 36 | .611 |
| Total | 125 | 65 | 60 | .520 | 17 | 10 | 14 | 31 | .452 | 22 | 36 | .611 |

Women's doubles – all matches

| Player | GP | GW | GL | PCT | A | DF | BPW | BPP | BP% | 3APW | 3APP | 3AP% |
|---|---|---|---|---|---|---|---|---|---|---|---|---|
| Taylor Townsend | 103 | 50 | 53 | .485 | 7 | 12 | 15 | 37 | .405 | 7 | 23 | .304 |
| Liezel Huber | 109 | 51 | 58 | .468 | 3 | 7 | 16 | 39 | .410 | 8 | 26 | .308 |
| Victoria Azarenka | 6 | 1 | 5 | .167 | 0 | 1 | 1 | 2 | .500 | 1 | 3 | .333 |
| Total | 109 | 51 | 58 | .468 | 10 | 20 | 16 | 39 | .410 | 8 | 26 | .308 |

Mixed doubles – all matches

| Player | GP | GW | GL | PCT | A | DF | BPW | BPP | BP% | 3APW | 3APP | 3AP% |
|---|---|---|---|---|---|---|---|---|---|---|---|---|
| Marcelo Melo | 117 | 70 | 47 | .598 | 9 | 3 | 23 | 49 | .469 | 15 | 29 | .517 |
| Liezel Huber | 109 | 65 | 44 | .596 | 1 | 13 | 21 | 45 | .467 | 13 | 27 | .481 |
| Victoria Azarenka | 8 | 5 | 3 | .625 | 0 | 1 | 2 | 4 | .500 | 2 | 2 | 1.000 |
| Total | 117 | 70 | 47 | .598 | 10 | 17 | 23 | 49 | .469 | 15 | 29 | .517 |

Team totals – all matches

| Event | GP | GW | GL | PCT | A | DF | BPW | BPP | BP% | 3APW | 3APP | 3AP% |
|---|---|---|---|---|---|---|---|---|---|---|---|---|
| Men's singles | 119 | 57 | 62 | .479 | 41 | 7 | 12 | 28 | .429 | 9 | 20 | .450 |
| Women's singles | 105 | 57 | 48 | .543 | 11 | 24 | 22 | 37 | .595 | 13 | 26 | .500 |
| Men's doubles | 125 | 65 | 60 | .520 | 17 | 10 | 14 | 31 | .452 | 22 | 36 | .611 |
| Women's doubles | 109 | 51 | 58 | .468 | 10 | 20 | 16 | 39 | .410 | 8 | 26 | .308 |
| Mixed doubles | 117 | 70 | 47 | .598 | 10 | 17 | 23 | 49 | .469 | 15 | 29 | .517 |
| Total | 575 | 300 | 275 | .522 | 89 | 78 | 87 | 184 | .473 | 67 | 137 | .489 |

== Transactions ==
- February 11, 2014: The Freedoms drafted Victoria Azarenka in the WTT Marquee Player Draft.
- February 11, 2014: The Freedoms left Sloane Stephens unprotected in the WTT Marquee Player Draft, effectively making her a free agent.
- March 11, 2014: The Freedoms selected Victoria Duval and Liezel Huber (who were protected) along with Marcelo Melo and Frank Dancevic in the WTT Roster Player Draft.
- March 11, 2014: The Freedoms left Samuel Groth, Jordan Kerr, Jessica Pegula and Sachia Vickery unprotected in the WTT Roster Player Draft, effectively making them free agents.
- July 5, 2014: The Freedoms signed Taylor Townsend as an injury-replacement roster player.

== Individual honors and achievements ==
Marcelo Melo was named WTT Male Most Valuable Player.

Melo led WTT in game-winning percentage in mixed doubles.

Liezel Huber was second in WTT in game-winning percentage in mixed doubles.

Taylor Townsend was third in WTT in game-winning percentage in women's singles and sixth in women's doubles.

== Charitable support ==
During each night of the 2014 season, the WTT team with the most aces received US$1,000 toward a local charity of the team's choice as part of a program called Mylan Aces. In the case of a tie, the award was split accordingly. The Freedoms earned $4,500 for Assistance in Healthcare which works in partnership with Cancer Treatment Centers of America through the program.
