= 2015 Boston Lobsters season =

- Conference: 3rd Eastern

Record
- 2015 record: 5 wins, 9 losses
- Home record: 1 win, 6 losses
- Road record: 4 wins, 3 losses
- Games won–lost: 253–283

Team info
- Owner(s): World TeamTennis
- General manager: Darlene Hayes
- Coach: Jan-Michael Gambill
- Stadium: Boston Lobsters Tennis Center at the Manchester Athletic Club (capacity: 1,634)
- Average attendance: 1,071

The 2015 Boston Lobsters season was the 11th and final season of the franchise (in its current incarnation) in World TeamTennis (WTT).

The Lobsters rebounded somewhat from their dismal 2014 season with 5 wins and 9 losses and narrowly missed qualifying for the WTT playoffs. The Lobsters were eliminated on the final day of the regular season when they lost to the Washington Kastles, 22–14.

On February 17, 2016, WTT announced that it had been unable to find a new owner for the Lobsters, and the franchise had folded.

== Season recap ==
=== Takeover of team by WTT ===
In early 2015, WTT took over operations of the Lobsters from former owner Bahar Uttam who retired from the sports business and walked away from the team. WTT began seeking a new local owner or ownership group for the Lobsters. By the end of the 2015 season, WTT commissioner Ilana Kloss said the league had had conversations with several interested buyers in New England. WTT's asking price for the Lobsters was US$1 million. Kloss said, "I think that’s probably the price we believe a team should be valued at."

=== Trade of Isner and draft ===
Prior to the WTT Draft on March 16, 2015, the Lobsters traded the top-ranked American player John Isner to the Springfield Lasers for undisclosed consideration which was presumably financial, since no other players or draft choices were moved in connection with the deal. The Lobsters used the first overall pick in the marquee portion of the draft to select Eugenie Bouchard. In the roster portion of the draft, the Lobsters didn't protect any players from their 2014 roster. They selected Irina Falconi, Scott Lipsky, Chase Buchanan and Arantxa Parra Santonja. Lipsky played with the team in 2014, as a substitute player but only appeared in two matches and could not be protected by the Lobsters in the draft.

=== Other player transactions ===
On July 9, 2015, the Lobsters announced that they had signed Alex Kuznetsov as a substitute player to replace Chase Buchanan who was injured and expected to miss the first six matches of the season.

On July 20, 2015, the Lobsters signed Tim Smyczek as a substitute player.

On July 21, 2015, the Lobsters signed Maria Sanchez as a substitute player.

On July 25, 2015, the Lobsters signed Jason Jung as a substitute player.

On July 28, 2015, the Lobsters signed Christian Harrison as a substitute player.

=== A strong first half ===
After losing their first two matches of the season, both at home, the Lobsters turned things around by winning the next three straight and four of the next five to give themselves 4 wins and 3 losses at the midway point. Three of those four wins came on the road.

The Lobsters' first win of the season came on July 14, when they visited the Springfield Lasers. The Lobsters won the first four sets. Alex Kuznetsov got things started by taking the men's singles and later teamed with Scott Lipsky to win a tiebreaker in the men's doubles set. Irina Falconi won a tiebreaker in the women's singles set and them paired with Arantxa Parra Santonja for a 5–0 set win in women's doubles that gave the Lobsters a 20–11 lead heading to the final set. In the mixed doubles set, Lipsky and Parra lost a tiebreaker that sent the match to extended play with the Lobsters leading 24–16. After getting broken in the opening game of extended play, Lipsky and Parra held serve in the third game to give the Lobsters a 25–18 victory.

The following evening, the Lobsters returned home to play the San Diego Aviators and put on their most dominating performance of the season. They won all five sets and cruised to a 25–13 victory. Kuznetsov opened the match with a 5–2 set win in men's singles and later joined Lipsky to take a tiebreaker in men's doubles. Falconi own the women's singles, 5–3, and teamed with Parra for a 5–2 set win in women's doubles. Parra and Lipsky closed out the match with a 5–2 mixed doubles set win.

The Lobsters' third straight win came on the road against the Philadelphia Freedoms on July 16. Trailing 12–11 after three sets, Falconi won the women's singles set, 5–2, to put the Lobsters in front 16–14. Lipsky and Kuznetsov closed out the match with a 5–3 set win in men's doubles that gave the Lobsters a 21–17 victory. Coming off a season in which they won only one of 14 matches, the Lobsters now found themselves with 3 wins and 2 losses and in first place in the Eastern Conference.

The Lobsters took their three-match winning streak on a West Coast trip. Leading 16–15 after four sets, the Lobsters could not hold on against the California Dream and fell, 20–17. Their scheduled match with the Aviators the following day was rained out, and the match was made up with a 10:00 a.m. PDT start time on July 20, because the Aviators already had a match scheduled for that evening. With Kuznetsov's contract having expired and the Lobsters unable to find a substitute, coach Jan-Michael Gambill stepped in to play in the morning tilt. He paired with Lipsky to win a tiebreaker in the opening set of men's doubles. After Falconi lost the women's singles set, Gambill fell to amateur Taylor Fritz in men's singles, 5–2, to give the Aviators a 14–10 lead after three sets. But the final two sets belonged to the Lobsters. Parra teamed with Falconi to win the women's doubles, 5–2, and then with Lipsky to win the mixed doubles, 5–3, and give the Lobsters a 20–19 victory.

=== Bouchard injured and second half struggles ===
The Lobsters continued their road trip when they visited the four-time defending WTT champion Washington Kastles on July 21. With both teams sporting records of 4 wins and 3 losses, this match was a battle for first place in the Eastern Conference. Earlier in the day, the Lobsters had learned that their top draft choice Eugenie Bouchard would miss the entire season with an injury. The news did not get any better. The Kastles dominated the match, winning all five sets. The loss for the Lobsters was the first of five consecutive setbacks.

=== Montoya coaches a match ===
With Lobsters coach Jan-Michael Gambill playing in his second match of the season on July 27, the team announced that Francisco Montoya, director of the Manchester Athletic Club Tennis Academy, would coach the team for that match. Entering the match with a four-match losing streak, the Lobsters were still in a position to make the playoffs on the strength of their solid play early in the season. In a crucial match against the Philadelphia Freedoms, the Lobsters erased a 12–10 deficit by winning the fourth set of women's doubles, 5–3, and tying the match at 15. However, the Freedoms took the final set of mixed doubles and dropped the Lobsters' record to 4 wins and 8 losses.

=== Final playoff push ===
Despite a five-match losing streak, the Lobsters still had control of their own playoff destiny. Wins in their final two matches, both on the road, against the Philadelphia Freedoms and the Washington Kastles would earn them a playoff berth. After dropping the opening set of men's singles, 5–0, against the Freedoms, the Lobsters roared back to win the next three sets to take a 15–12 lead. Irina Falconi and Arantxa Parra Santonja started the comeback with a 5–2 set win in women's doubles. Christian Harrison and Scott Lipsky followed by winning a tiebreaker in men's doubles. Falconi put the Lobsters in front with a 5–1 women's singles set win. Parra and Lipsky dropped the final set of mixed doubles, 5–3, to send the match to extended play with the Lobsters leading, 18–17. In the first game of extended play, Parra and Lipsky jumped in front, 1–3, with Marcelo Melo serving for the Freedoms. Melo and Taylor Townsend were able to turn back the first two break points. But Parra and Lipsky broke at 3 all to seal a 19–17 victory for the Lobsters that kept their playoff hopes alive.

The Lobsters' playoff fate was decided in their final match of the season against the Kastles. Washington won the first two sets to take a 10–4 lead. The Lobsters battled back with a 5–3 mixed doubles set win by Lipsky and Parra over the reigning Wimbledon mixed doubles champions Leander Paes and Martina Hingis. Parra and Falconi followed by taking the women's doubles set in a tiebreaker to cut the Kastles' lead to 17–14. But Sam Querrey dominated Harrison in the final set of men's singles, 5–0, to seal the match for the Kastles and seal the Lobsters' fate. Since the Freedoms and Lobsters finished the regular season with identical 5–9 records, the WTT standings tiebreaker system was used to break the tie. The teams split their four regular-season meetings. So, the tie was broken by comparing games won in head-to-head matches, which favored the Freedoms, 78–71. The biggest contribution to this margin was made by the Freedoms' 24–14 road victory over the Lobsters on July 22.

=== Franchise folded ===
On February 17, 2016, WTT announced that it had been unable to find a new owner for the Lobsters, and the franchise had folded. In a press release, WTT commissioner Ilana Kloss said, "We spent more than a year seeking a local owner or ownership group, but unfortunately we were not able to find the right fit." She went on to say that WTT was leaving the door open for a return to Boston if the right ownership could be found. Keith Callahan, general manager of the Manchester Athletic Club said that the club had been approached by WTT to take over ownership of the team but had turned it down. "We just made a decision not to do that," he said. "It would have taken an enormous amount of resources to take on an operation like that, and we made a decision to commit those resources to improving the business and to making improvements for our members to make the operation better for them and for the community."

== Event chronology ==
- March 16, 2015: The Lobsters traded John Isner to the Springfield Lasers for undisclosed consideration.
- March 16, 2015: The Lobsters selected Eugenie Bouchard, Irina Falconi, Scott Lipsky, Chase Buchanan and Arantxa Parra Santonja at the WTT draft.
- July 9, 2015: The Lobsters signed Alex Kuznetsov as a substitute player.
- July 20, 2015: The Lobsters signed Tim Smyczek as a substitute player.
- July 21, 2015: The Lobsters signed Maria Sanchez as a substitute player.
- July 25, 2015: The Lobsters signed Jason Jung as a substitute player.
- July 28, 2015: The Lobsters signed Christian Harrison as a substitute player.
- July 29, 2015: With a record of 5 wins and 9 losses, the Lobsters were eliminated from playoff contention when they lost to the Washington Kastles, 22–14.
- February 17, 2016: WTT announced that the Lobsters franchise had folded.

== Draft picks ==
Since the Lobsters had the worst record in WTT in 2014, they had the first choice in each round of the draft. Unlike previous seasons in which WTT conducted its Marquee Player Draft and its Roster Player Draft on different dates about one month apart, the league conducted a single draft at the Indian Wells Tennis Garden in Indian Wells, California on March 16, 2015. The selections made by the Lobsters are shown in the table below.

Draft type	Round	No.	Overall	Player chosen	Prot?
Marquee	1	1	1	(Canada) Eugenie Bouchard	N
Marquee	2	1	8	Pass	–
Marquee	3	1	15	Pass	–
Roster	1	1	1	(United States) Irina Falconi	N
Roster	2	1	8	(United States) Scott Lipsky	N
Roster	3	1	15	(United States) Chase Buchanan	N
Roster	4	1	22	(Spain) Arantxa Parra Santonja	N

== Match log ==
Legend
Lobsters Win	Lobsters Loss
Home team in CAPS

Match	Date	Venue and location	Result and details	Record
1	July 12	Boston Lobsters Tennis Center at the Manchester Athletic Club; Manchester-by-the-Sea, Massachusetts	Washington Kastles 20, BOSTON LOBSTERS 17 * XD: Anastasia Rodionova/Rajeev Ram (Kastles) 5, Arantxa Parra Santonja/Scott Lipsky (Lobsters) 3 * WD: Madison Brengle/Anastasia Rodionova (Kastles) 5, Irina Falconi/Arantxa Parra Santonja (Lobsters) 2 * MS: Alex Kuznetsov (Lobsters) 5, Denis Kudla (Kastles) 0 * WS: Madison Brengle (Kastles) 5, Irina Falconi (Lobsters) 3 * MD: Denis Kudla/Rajeev Ram (Kastles) 5, Scott Lipsky/Alex Kuznetsov (Lobsters) 4	0–1
2	July 13	Boston Lobsters Tennis Center at the Manchester Athletic Club; Manchester-by-the-Sea, Massachusetts	Austin Aces 22, BOSTON LOBSTERS 18 (extended play) * MS: Teymuraz Gabashvili (Aces) 5, Alex Kuznetsov (Lobsters) 2 * WD: Alla Kudryavtseva/Nicole Gibbs (Aces) 5, Arantxa Parra Santonja/Irina Falconi (Lobsters) 4 * XD: Arantxa Parra Santonja/Scott Lipsky (Lobsters) 5, Alla Kudryavtseva/Teymuraz Gabashvili (Aces) 2 * WS: Nicole Gibbs (Aces) 5, Irina Falconi (Lobsters) 2 * MD: Scott Lipsky/Alex Kuznetsov (Lobsters) 5, Teymuraz Gabashvili/Jarmere Jenkins (Aces) 4 * EP - MD: Teymuraz Gabashvili/Jarmere Jenkins (Aces) 1, Scott Lipsky/Alex Kuznetsov (Lobsters) 0	0–2
3	July 14	Mediacom Stadium at Cooper Tennis Complex; Springfield, Missouri	Boston Lobsters 25, SPRINGFIELD LASERS 18 (extended play) * MS: Alex Kuznetsov (Lobsters) 5, Michael Russell (Lasers) 3 * WS: Irina Falconi (Lobsters) 5, Varvara Lepchenko (Lasers) 4 * MD: Alex Kuznetsov/Scott Lipsky (Lobsters) 5, Andre Begemann/Michael Russell (Lasers) 4 * WD: Irina Falconi/Arantxa Parra Santonja (Lobsters) 5, Anna-Lena Grönefeld/Varvara Lepchenko (Lasers) 0 * XD: Andre Begemann/Anna-Lena Grönefeld (Lasers) 5, Scott Lipsky/Arantxa Parra Santonja (Lobsters) 4 * EP - XD: Andre Begemann/Anna-Lena Grönefeld (Lasers) 2, Scott Lipsky/Arantxa Parra Santonja (Lobsters) 1	1–2
4	July 15	Boston Lobsters Tennis Center at the Manchester Athletic Club; Manchester-by-the-Sea, Massachusetts	BOSTON LOBSTERS 25, San Diego Aviators 13 * MS: Alex Kuznetsov (Lobsters) 5, Taylor Fritz (Aviators) 2 * WS: Irina Falconi (Lobsters) 5, Chanelle Scheepers (Aviators) 3 * MD: Alex Kuznetsov/Scott Lipsky (Lobsters) 5, Taylor Fritz/Raven Klaasen (Aviators) 4 * WD: Irina Falconi/Arantxa Parra Santonja (Lobsters) 5, Darija Jurak/Chanelle Scheepers (Aviators) 2 * XD: Arantxa Parra Santonja/Scott Lipsky (Lobsters) 5, Darija Jurak/Raven Klaasen (Aviators) 2	2–2
5	July 16	The Pavilion; Radnor Township, Pennsylvania	Boston Lobsters 21, PHILADELPHIA FREEDOMS 17 * MS: Robby Ginepri (Freedoms) 5, Alex Kuznetsov (Lobsters) 2 * WD: Arantxa Parra Santonja/Irina Falconi (Lobsters) 5, Asia Muhammad/Taylor Townsend (Freedoms) 2 * XD: Marcelo Melo/Taylor Townsend (Freedoms) 5, Scott Lipsky/Irina Falconi (Lobsters) 4 *** Irina Falconi substituted for Arantxa Parra Santonja at 3–2 * WS: Irina Falconi (Lobsters) 5, Taylor Townsend (Freedoms) 2 * MD: Scott Lipsky/Alex Kuznetsov (Lobsters) 5, Marcelo Melo/Robby Ginepri (Freedoms) 3	3–2
6	July 18	Dream Stadium at Sunrise Mall; Citrus Heights, California	CALIFORNIA DREAM 20, Boston Lobsters 17 * MS: Tennys Sandgren (Dream) 5, Alex Kuznetsov (Lobsters) 2 * WS: Jarmila Gajdošová (Dream) 5, Irina Falconi (Lobsters) 4 * MD: Alex Kuznetsov/Scott Lipsky (Lobsters) 5, Tennys Sandgren/Neal Skupski (Dream) 1 * WD: Irina Falconi/Arantxa Parra Santonja (Lobsters) 5, Anabel Medina Garrigues/Jarmila Gajdošová (Dream) 4 * XD: Neal Skupski/Anabel Medina Garrigues (Dream) 5, Scott Lipsky/Arantxa Parra Santonja (Lobsters) 1	3–3
7	July 19	Omni La Costa Resort and Spa; Carlsbad, California	Boston Lobsters at SAN DIEGO AVIATORS; Postponed due to rain. Make-up on July 20 at 10:00 a.m.	3–3
7	July 20	Omni La Costa Resort and Spa; Carlsbad, California	Boston Lobsters 20, SAN DIEGO AVIATORS 19 * MD: Jan-Michael Gambill/Scott Lipsky (Lobsters) 5, Raven Klaasen/Taylor Fritz (Aviators) 4 * WS: Chanelle Scheepers (Aviators) 5, Irina Falconi (Lobsters) 3 * MS: Taylor Fritz (Aviators) 5, Jan-Michael Gambill (Lobsters) 2 * WD: Irina Falconi/Arantxa Parra Santonja (Lobsters) 5, Chanelle Scheepers/Darija Jurak (Aviators) 2 * XD: Arantxa Parra Santonja/Scott Lipsky (Lobsters) 5, Darija Jurak/Raven Klaasen (Aviators) 3	4–3
8	July 21	Kastles Stadium at the Charles E. Smith Center; Washington, District of Columbia	WASHINGTON KASTLES 25, Boston Lobsters 13 * XD: Anastasia Rodionova/Leander Paes (Kastles) 5, Maria Sanchez/Scott Lipsky (Lobsters) 2 * WD: Anastasia Rodionova/Madison Brengle (Kastles) 5, Irina Falconi/Maria Sanchez (Lobsters) 0 * MD: Leander Paes/Sam Querrey (Kastles) 5, Scott Lipsky/Tim Smyczek (Lobsters) 4 * WS: Madison Brengle (Kastles) 5, Irina Falconi (Lobsters) 3 * MS: Sam Querrey (Kastles) 5, Tim Smyczek (Lobsters) 4	4–4
9	July 22	Boston Lobsters Tennis Center at the Manchester Athletic Club; Manchester-by-the-Sea, Massachusetts	Philadelphia Freedoms 24, BOSTON LOBSTERS 14 * XD: Scott Lipsky/Arantxa Parra Santonja (Lobsters) 5, Marcelo Melo/Taylor Townsend (Freedoms) 4 * WS: Taylor Townsend (Freedoms) 5, Irina Falconi (Lobsters) 0 * MS: Robby Ginepri (Freedoms) 5, Tim Smyczek (Lobsters) 4 * WD: Taylor Townsend/Abigail Spears (Freedoms) 5, Irina Falconi/Arantxa Parra Santonja (Lobsters) 4 * MD: Marcelo Melo/Robby Ginepri (Freedoms) 5, Scott Lipsky/Tim Smyczek (Lobsters) 1	4–5
10	July 23	Boston Lobsters Tennis Center at the Manchester Athletic Club; Manchester-by-the-Sea, Massachusetts	Washington Kastles 25, BOSTON LOBSTERS 14 * XD: Leander Paes/Martina Hingis (Kastles) 5, Scott Lipsky/Arantxa Parra Santonja (Lobsters) 2 * WD: Martina Hingis/Anastasia Rodionova (Kastles) 5, Arantxa Parra Santonja/Irina Falconi (Lobsters) 2 * MD: Leander Paes/Sam Querrey (Kastles) 5, Scott Lipsky/Tim Smyczek (Lobsters) 4 * WS: Martina Hingis (Kastles) 5, Irina Falconi (Lobsters) 3 * MS: Sam Querrey (Kastles) 5, Tim Smyczek (Lobsters) 3	4–6
11	July 25	Boston Lobsters Tennis Center at the Manchester Athletic Club; Manchester-by-the-Sea, Massachusetts	California Dream 21, BOSTON LOBSTERS 19 (extended play) * MS: Tennys Sandgren (Dream) 5, Jason Jung (Lobsters) 3 * WS: Jarmila Gajdošová (Dream) 5, Irina Falconi (Lobsters) 2 * MD: Jason Jung/Scott Lipsky (Lobsters) 5, Bob Bryan/Mike Bryan (Dream) 2 * XD: Mike Bryan/Anabel Medina Garrigues (Dream) 5, Scott Lipsky/Arantxa Parra Santonja (Lobsters) 4 *** Mike Bryan substituted for Bob Bryan at 1–2 * WD: Irina Falconi/Arantxa Parra Santonja (Lobsters) 5, Anabel Medina Garrigues/Jarmila Gajdošová (Dream) 3 * EP - WD: Anabel Medina Garrigues/Jarmila Gajdošová (Dream) 1, Irina Falconi/Arantxa Parra Santonja (Lobsters) 0	4–7
12	July 27	Boston Lobsters Tennis Center at the Manchester Athletic Club; Manchester-by-the-Sea, Massachusetts	Philadelphia Freedoms 20, BOSTON LOBSTERS 17 * MS: Robby Ginepri (Freedoms) 5, Jan-Michael Gambill (Lobsters) 2 * WS: Irina Falconi (Lobsters) 5, Coco Vandeweghe (Freedoms) 2 * MD: Robby Ginepri/Marcelo Melo (Freedoms) 5, Jan-Michael Gambill/Scott Lipsky (Lobsters) 3 * WD: Arantxa Parra Santonja/Irina Falconi (Lobsters) 5, Coco Vandeweghe/Taylor Townsend (Freedoms) 3 * XD: Taylor Townsend/Marcelo Melo (Freedoms) 5, Arantxa Parra Santonja/Scott Lipsky (Lobsters) 2	4–8
13	July 28	The Pavilion; Radnor Township, Pennsylvania	Boston Lobsters 19, PHILADELPHIA FREEDOMS 17 (extended play) * MS: Robby Ginepri (Freedoms) 5, Christian Harrison (Lobsters) 0 * WD: Irina Falconi/Arantxa Parra Santonja (Lobsters) 5, Taylor Townsend/Coco Vandeweghe (Freedoms) 2 * MD: Christian Harrison/Scott Lipsky (Lobsters) 5, Robby Ginepri/Marcelo Melo (Freedoms) 4 * WS: Irina Falconi (Lobsters) 5, Taylor Townsend (Freedoms) 1 *** Taylor Townsend substituted for Coco Vandeweghe at 1–3 * XD: Taylor Townsend/Marcelo Melo (Freedoms) 5, Arantxa Parra Santonja/Scott Lipsky (Lobsters) 3 * EP - XD: Arantxa Parra Santonja/Scott Lipsky (Lobsters) 1, Taylor Townsend/Marcelo Melo (Freedoms) 0	5–8
14	July 29	Kastles Stadium at the Charles E. Smith Center; Washington, District of Columbia	WASHINGTON KASTLES 22, Boston Lobsters 14 * MD: Leander Paes/Sam Querrey (Kastles) 5, Scott Lipsky/Christian Harrison (Lobsters) 3 * WS: Martina Hingis (Kastles) 5, Irina Falconi (Lobsters) 1 * XD: Scott Lipsky/Arantxa Parra Santonja (Lobsters) 5, Leander Paes/Martina Hingis (Kastles) 3 * WD: Irina Falconi/Arantxa Parra Santonja (Lobsters) 5, Martina Hingis/Anastasia Rodionova (Kastles) 4 * MS: Sam Querrey (Kastles) 5, Christian Harrison (Lobsters) 0	5–9

== Team personnel ==
=== On-court personnel ===
- (United States) Jan-Michael Gambill – Player/Head Coach
- (United States) Francisco Montoya – Head Coach (July 27 match only)
- (Canada) Eugenie Bouchard (injured, did not play)
- (United States) Chase Buchanan (Note: Roster player who appeared in fewer than three matches due to injury and was ineligible to be protected in the draft the following year, because the player fails to meet WTT's injury exception which requires the player to have been on the team in 2014.)
- (United States) Irina Falconi
- (United States) Christian Harrison (Note: Player appeared in fewer than three matches during the season as a substitute player and was not eligible to be protected in the following year's draft.)
- (United States) Jason Jung
- (United States) Alex Kuznetsov
- (United States) Scott Lipsky
- (United States) Maria Sanchez
- (Spain) Arantxa Parra Santonja
- (United States) Tim Smyczek

=== Front office ===
- Darlene Hayes – General Manager

== Statistics ==
Players are listed in order of their game-winning percentage provided they played in at least 40% of the Lobsters' games in that event, which is the WTT minimum for qualification for league leaders in individual statistical categories. (Note: Tim Smyczek's statistics are not listed on the Lobsters' statistics page on WTT's website. They have been compiled from the referenced match summaries.) (Note: There may be minor errors in some of the statistics shown in this section, since the numbers reported by WTT on its website, after taking Smyczek's statistics into account, cannot possibly be correct. For example, the sum of break points played and won by male mixed doubles players does not equal the sum of break points played and won by female mixed doubles players. Where possible, posting errors have been identified and corrected based on the match statistical summaries. However, in some cases, the original source match summaries are suspect as well. For example, in the July 16 match, the Lobsters' male player in the mixed doubles set converted 1 of 2 break point opportunities, while the Lobsters' two female players who participated in the set also each converted a 1 of 2 break point opportunities.)

Men's singles

Player	GP	GW	GL	PCT	A	DF	BPW	BPP	BP%	3APW	3APP	3AP%
Alex Kuznetsov	41	21	20	.512	5	5	4	12	.333	4	12	.333
Tim Smyczek	26	11	15	.423	1	3	0	6	.000	3	6	.500
Jason Jung	8	3	5	.375	0	0	0	0	-	1	1	1.000
Jan-Michael Gambill	14	4	10	.286	2	1	1	2	.500	1	3	.333
Christian Harrison	10	0	10	.000	0	0	0	1	.000	0	1	.000
Total	99	39	60	.394	8	9	5	21	.238	9	23	.391

Women's singles

Player	GP	GW	GL	PCT	A	DF	BPW	BPP	BP%	3APW	3APP	3AP%
Irina Falconi	103	46	57	.447	3	18	15	43	.349	17	32	.531
Total	103	46	57	.447	3	18	15	43	.349	17	32	.531

Men's doubles

Player	GP	GW	GL	PCT	A	DF	BPW	BPP	BP%	3APW	3APP	3AP%
Alex Kuznetsov	51	29	22	.569	5	1	6	11	.545	5	10	.500
Scott Lipsky	116	59	57	.509	5	4	11	25	.440	12	26	.462
Jason Jung	7	5	2	.714	1	0	1	1	1.000	1	1	1.000
Jan-Michael Gambill	17	8	9	.471	0	1	2	3	.667	0	1	.000
Christian Harrison	17	8	9	.471	0	0	1	2	.500	1	3	.333
Tim Smyczek	24	9	15	.375	3	1	1	8	.125	5	11	.455
Total	116	59	57	.509	14	7	11	25	.440	11	26	.462

Women's doubles

Player	GP	GW	GL	PCT	A	DF	BPW	BPP	BP%	3APW	3APP	3AP%
Arantxa Parra Santonja	100	57	43	.570	1	9	16	31	.516	11	22	.500
Irina Falconi	105	57	48	.543	1	8	16	31	.516	11	23	.478
Maria Sanchez	5	0	5	.000	1	0	0	0	-	0	1	.000
Total	105	57	48	.543	3	17	16	31	.516	11	23	.478

Mixed doubles

Player	GP	GW	GL	PCT	A	DF	BPW	BPP	BP%	3APW	3APP	3AP%
Arantxa Parra Santonja	102	49	53	.480	1	6	9	31	.290	9	17	.529
Scott Lipsky	113	52	61	.460	11	14	9	33	.273	10	20	.500
Maria Sanchez	7	2	5	.286	0	3	0	2	.000	1	3	.333
Irina Falconi	4	1	3	.250	0	0	0	0	-	0	0	-
Total	113	52	61	.460	12	23	9	33	.273	10	20	.500

Team totals

Event	GP	GW	GL	PCT	A	DF	BPW	BPP	BP%	3APW	3APP	3AP%
Men's singles	99	39	60	.394	8	9	5	21	.238	9	23	.391
Women's singles	103	46	57	.447	3	18	15	43	.349	17	32	.531
Men's doubles	116	59	57	.509	14	7	11	25	.440	11	26	.462
Women's doubles	105	57	48	.543	3	17	16	31	.516	11	23	.478
Mixed doubles	113	52	61	.460	12	23	9	33	.273	10	20	.500
Total	536	253	283	.370	40	74	52	153	.340	58	124	.468

== Transactions ==
- March 16, 2015: The Lobsters traded John Isner to the Springfield Lasers for undisclosed consideration.
- March 16, 2015: The Lobsters selected Eugenie Bouchard, Irina Falconi, Scott Lipsky, Chase Buchanan and Arantxa Parra Santonja at the WTT draft.
- March 16, 2015: The Lobsters left Eric Butorac, James Cerretani, Rik de Voest, Sharon Fichman, Megan Moulton-Levy and Caitlin Whoriskey unprotected in the WTT Draft effectively making them all free agents.
- July 9, 2015: The Lobsters signed Alex Kuznetsov as a substitute player.
- July 20, 2015: The Lobsters signed Tim Smyczek as a substitute player.
- July 21, 2015: The Lobsters signed Maria Sanchez as a substitute player.
- July 25, 2015: The Lobsters signed Jason Jung as a substitute player.
- July 28, 2015: The Lobsters signed Christian Harrison as a substitute player.

== Individual achievements ==
Alex Kuznetsov was third in WTT in winning percentage in both men's singles and men's doubles. Arantxa Parra Santonja was third in WTT in winning percentage in women's doubles. Irina Falconi was fourth in WTT in winning percentage in women's doubles. Scott Lipsky was sixth in WTT in winning percentage in men's doubles.
