= 2013 New York Sportimes season =

- Conference: 4th Eastern

Record
- 2013 record: 4 wins, 10 losses
- Home record: 3 wins, 4 losses
- Road record: 1 win, 6 losses
- Games won–lost: 252–281

Team info
- Owner(s): Sportime Clubs et al
- President/CEO: Claude Okin
- General manager: Jed Murray
- Coach: Claude Okin
- Captain: John McEnroe
- Stadium: SEFCU Arena (Capacity: 2,100); Sportime Stadium at Randall's Island (Capacity: 2,000)

The 2013 New York Sportimes season was the 19th season of the franchise in World TeamTennis (WTT) including the history it inherited from the 2011 merger with the New York Buzz, the 15th season since the founding of the New York metropolitan area-franchise and its third playing home matches in both New York City and the Capital District.

The Sportimes finished in last place in the Eastern Conference and had the worst record in WTT in 2013. The team played five of its home matches in Guilderland, New York and the other two in New York City. This was the opposite of what it had done in the first two post-merger seasons.

On January 15, 2014, Sportimes CEO Claude Okin announced that the franchise had been sold to businessman Russell Geyser and his minority partner Jack McGrory, and the team would be relocated to San Diego, California and renamed the San Diego Aviators. Okin said, "This is a bittersweet event for me personally. I am very glad to have found a motivated and able new owner for the franchise: a person who will be able to re-imagine it in another great tennis town – but I will miss my team."

== Season recap ==
=== Personnel changes ===
Prior to the 2013 roster player draft, the Sportimes traded Martina Hingis to the Washington Kastles for financial consideration. Also prior to the draft, the Sportimes acquired Anna-Lena Grönefeld from the Orange County Breakers for financial consideration. Robert Kendrick, Jesse Witten and Květa Peschke all returned for the 2013 season. Although not protected by the Sportimes in the marquee draft in February, John McEnroe was signed as a wildcard player in March, and played for the team in 2013. Claude Okin, the team's principal owner and CEO, also served as the team's coach for 2013. Abigail Spears was re-signed before the start of the season as a substitute player. She only appeared in the opening match. During the season, Eric Quigley was signed as a substitute player as well and appeared in one match. James Blake was also signed during the season as a wildcard player and appeared in one match for the Sportimes. Since WTT teams are permitted to have only one wildcard player of each gender, Blake was effectively released by the Sportimes when McEnroe was designated as the team's male wildcard player on July 18, 2013.

=== Return to Guilderland ===
After a temporary one-year absence during which it played its Capital District home matches in Troy, New York, the Sportimes returned to SEFCU Arena in Guilderland. The team reversed what it had done during the first two seasons after the merger with the Buzz by playing five of its home matches in the Capital District and only two at Sportime Stadium at Randall's Island in New York City.

=== Disappointing results ===
The Sportimes finished with a dismal record of 4 wins and 10 losses, last in the Eastern Conference and the worst record in WTT. The team's final home match in Guilderland was a 20–13 loss to the Orange County Breakers on July 18, 2013. The team's final home match in New York City was a 23–15 overtime loss to the Washington Kastles on July 23, 2013.

== Event chronology ==
- March 11, 2013: John McEnroe who was not protected by the Sportimes in the marquee draft one month earlier, was signed by the Sportimes as a wildcard player.
- March 12, 2013: The Sportimes traded the rights to Martina Hingis to the Washington Kastles for financial consideration.
- March 12, 2013: The Sportimes acquired the rights to Anna-Lena Grönefeld in a trade with the Orange County Breakers in exchange for financial consideration.
- July 11, 2013: The Sportimes signed James Blake as a wildcard player. Blake appeared in only one match for the team.
- July 18, 2013: The Sportimes' designation of John McEnroe as their male wildcard player results in the effective release of James Blake.
- July 18, 2013: The Sportimes played what would be their final home match in the Capital District, a 20–13 loss to the Orange County Breakers at SEFCU Arena in Guilderland.
- July 23, 2013: The Sportimes played what would be their final home match in New York City, a 23–15 overtime loss to the Washington Kastles at Sportime Stadium at Randall's Island.
- July 24, 2013: The Sportimes lost their final match of the season, 20–11, to the Philadelphia Freedoms at the Pavilion dropping their record to 4 wins and 10 losses and eliminating them from playoff contention.
- January 15, 2014: Sportimes CEO Claude Okin announced that the franchise had been sold to businessman Russell Geyser and his minority partner Jack McGrory, and the team would be relocated to San Diego, California and renamed the San Diego Aviators.

== Draft picks ==
Based on their loss in the 2012 Eastern Conference Championship Match and record of 9 wins and 5 losses, which was better than the other conference championship loser, the Sportimes had sixth selection in each round of both WTT drafts.

=== Marquee player draft ===
The Sportimes passed on both of their selections in the marquee player draft. They did not protect John McEnroe.

=== Roster player draft ===
The selections made by the Sportimes are shown in the table below.

Round	No.	Overall	Player chosen	Prot?
1	6	6	Robert Kendrick	Y
2	6	14	Jesse Witten	Y
3	6	22	Anna-Lena Grönefeld	Y
4	6	30	Květa Peschke	Y

== Match log ==
=== Regular season ===
Legend
Sportimes Win	Sportimes Loss
Home team in CAPS

Match	Date	Venue and location	Result and details	Record
1	July 7	Joan Norton Tennis Center at the Manchester Athletic Club; Manchester-by-the-Sea, Massachusetts	BOSTON LOBSTERS 20, New York Sportimes 18 * MS: Amir Weintraub (Lobsters) 5, Jesse Witten (Sportimes) 4 * WD: Květa Peschke/Abigail Spears (Sportimes) 5, Jill Craybas/Katalin Marosi (Lobsters) 2 * XD: Katalin Marosi/Eric Butorac (Lobsters) 5, Květa Peschke/Robert Kendrick (Sportimes) 2 * WS: Abigail Spears (Sportimes) 5, Jill Craybas (Lobsters) 3 * MD: Eric Butorac/Amir Weintraub (Lobsters) 5, Robert Kendrick/Jesse Witten (Sportimes) 2	0–1
2	July 8	Kastles Stadium at The Wharf; Washington, District of Columbia	WASHINGTON KASTLES 23, New York Sportimes 15 * MS: Kevin Anderson (Kastles) 5, Jesse Witten (Sportimes) 2 * WS: Martina Hingis (Kastles) 5, Anna-Lena Grönefeld (Sportimes) 1 * XD: Leander Paes/Martina Hingis (Kastles) 5, Robert Kendrick/Květa Peschke (Sportimes) 4 * WD: Anna-Lena Grönefeld/Květa Peschke (Sportimes) 5, Martina Hingis/Anastasia Rodionova (Kastles) 3 * MD: Leander Paes/Bobby Reynolds (Kastles) 5, Robert Kendrick/Jesse Witten (Sportimes) 3	0–2
3	July 9	SEFCU Arena; Guilderland, New York	NEW YORK SPORTIMES 22, Springfield Lasers 21 * MD: Andy Roddick/Jean-Julien Rojer (Lasers) 5, Robert Kendrick/Jesse Witten (Sportimes) 4 * XD: Jesse Witten/Květa Peschke (Sportimes) 5, Jean-Julien Rojer/Alisa Kleybanova (Lasers) 4 * MS: Jesse Witten (Sportimes) 5, Andy Roddick (Lasers) 4 * WS: Vania King (Lasers) 5, Anna-Lena Grönefeld (Sportimes) 3 * WD: Anna-Lena Grönefeld/Květa Peschke (Sportimes) 5, Alisa Kleybanova/Vania King (Lasers) 3	1–2
4	July 10	Joan Norton Tennis Center at the Manchester Athletic Club; Manchester-by-the-Sea, Massachusetts	New York Sportimes 24, BOSTON LOBSTERS 17 * MS: Jesse Witten (Sportimes) 5, Amir Weintraub (Lobsters) 3 * WS: Jill Craybas (Lobsters) 5, Anna-Lena Grönefeld (Sportimes) 4 * MD: Robert Kendrick/Jesse Witten (Sportimes) 5, Eric Butorac/Amir Weintraub (Lobsters) 4 * WD: Anna-Lena Grönefeld/Květa Peschke (Sportimes) 5, Jill Craybas/Katalin Marosi (Lobsters) 2 * XD: Jesse Witten/Květa Peschke (Sportimes) 5, Eric Butorac/Katalin Marosi (Lobsters) 3	2–2
5	July 12	SEFCU Arena; Guilderland, New York	Philadelphia Freedoms 20, NEW YORK SPORTIMES 19 (super tiebreaker, 7–1) * MD: Samuel Groth/Jordan Kerr (Freedoms) 5, Jesse Witten/Eric Quigley (Sportimes) 3 * WS: Victoria Duval (Freedoms) 5, Anna-Lena Grönefeld (Sportimes) 4 * MS: Jesse Witten (Sporimes) 5, Samuel Groth (Freedoms) 3 * XD: Samuel Groth/Liezel Huber (Freedoms) 5, Jesse Witten/Anna-Lena Grönefeld (Sportimes) 1 * WD: Anna-Lena Grönefeld/Květa Peschke (Sportimes) 5, Victoria Duval/Liezel Huber (Freedoms) 1 * OT – WD: Anna-Lena Grönefeld/Květa Peschke (Sportimes) 1, Victoria Duval/Liezel Huber (Freedoms) 0 * STB – WD: Victoria Duval/Liezel Huber (Freedoms) 7, Anna-Lena Grönefeld/Květa Peschke (Sportimes) 1	2–3
6	July 15	SEFCU Arena; Guilderland, New York	NEW YORK SPORTIMES 22, Philadelphia Freedoms 17 * MD: James Blake/Jesse Witten (Sportimes) 5, Samuel Groth/Jordan Kerr (Freedoms) 2 * WS: Anna-Lena Grönefeld (Sportimes) 5, Victoria Duval (Freedoms) 2 * MS: Samuel Groth (Freedoms) 5, James Blake (Sportimes) 2 * XD: Květa Peschke/James Blake (Sportimes) 5, Liezel Huber/Samuel Groth (Freedoms) 4 * WD: Anna-Lena Grönefeld/Květa Peschke (Sportimes) 5, Victoria Duval/Liezel Huber 4	3–3
7	July 16	SEFCU Arena; Guilderland, New York	NEW YORK SPORTIMES 21, Boston Lobsters 14 * MD: Robert Kendrick/Jesse Witten (Sportimes) 5, Eric Butorac/Amir Weintraub (Lobsters) 4 * XD: Květa Peschke/Robert Kendrick (Sportimes) 5, Katalin Marosi/Eric Butorac (Lobsters) 2 * MS: Amir Weintraub (Lobsters) 5, Jesse Witten (Sportimes) 1 * WS: Anna-Lena Grönefeld (Sportimes) 5, Jill Craybas (Lobsters) 1 * WD: Anna-Lena Grönefeld/Květa Peschke (Sportimes) 5, Jill Craybas/Katalin Marosi (Losters) 2	4–3
8	July 17	The Pavilion; Radnor Township, Pennsylvania	PHILADELPHIA FREEDOMS 21, New York Sportimes 16 * MS: Jesse Witten (Sportimes) 5, Samuel Groth (Freedoms) 3 * WD: Anna-Lena Grönefeld/Květa Peschke (Sportimes) 5, Liezel Huber/Victoria Duval (Freedoms) 3 * XD: Samuel Groth/Liezel Huber (Freedoms) 5, Robert Kendrick/Květa Peschke (Sportimes) 2 * WS: Victoria Duval (Freedoms) 5, Anna-Lena Grönefeld (Sportimes) 1 * MD: Samuel Groth/Jordan Kerr (Freedoms) 5, Robert Kendrick/Jesse Witten (Sportimes) 3	4–4
9	July 18	SEFCU Arena; Guilderland, New York	Orange County Breakers 20, NEW YORK SPORTIMES 13 * MS: Steve Johnson (Breakers) 5, Jesse Witten (Sportimes) 3 * XD: Květa Peschke/John McEnroe (Sportimes) 5, Maria Elena Camerin/Treat Huey (Breakers) 0 * MD: Treat Huey/Steve Johnson (Breakers) 5, Robert Kendrick/John McEnroe (Sportimes) 2 * WS: Coco Vandeweghe (Breakers) 5, Anna-Lena Grönefeld (Sportimes) 2 * WD: Maria Elena Camerin/Coco Vandeweghe (Breakers) 5, Anna-Lena Grönefeld/Květa Peschke (Sportimes) 1	4–5
10	July 20	Kastles Stadium at The Wharf; Washington, District of Columbia	WASHINGTON KASTLES 21, New York Sportimes 20 * MS: Bobby Reynolds (Kastles) 5, Jesse Witten (Sportimes) 4 * WS: Anna-Lena Grönefeld (Sportimes) 5, Martina Hingis (Kastles) 2 * XD: Květa Peschke/Robert Kendrick (Sportimes) 5, Martina Hingis/Rajeev Ram (Kastles) 4 * WD: Martina Hingis/Anastasia Rodionova (Kastles) 5, Květa Peschke/Anna-Lena Grönefeld (Sportimes) 4 * MD: Rajeev Ram/Bobby Reynolds (Kastles) 5, Robert Kendrick/Jesse Witten (Sportimes) 2	4–6
11	July 21	Mediacom Stadium at Cooper Tennis Complex; Springfield, Missouri	SPRINGFIELD LASERS 22, New York Sportimes 16 * XD: Jean-Julien Rojer/Alisa Kleybanova (Lasers) 5, Květa Peschke/Robert Kendrick (Sportimes) 2 * WD: Anna-Lena Grönefeld/Květa Peschke (Sportimes) 5, Alisa KleybanovaVania King (Lasers) 3 * MS: Jesse Witten (Sportimes) 5, Rik de Voest (Lasers) 4 * WS: Alisa Kleybanova (Lasers) 5, Anna-Lena Grönefeld (Sportimes) 2 * MD: Jean-Julien Rojer/Rik De Voest (Lasers) 5, Jesse Witten/Robert Kendrick (Sportimes) 2	4–7
12	July 22	Sportime Stadium at Randall's Island; New York, New York	Texas Wild 22, NEW YORK SPORTIMES 20 (overtime) * MD: Alex Bogomolov, Jr./Aisam-ul-Haq Qureshi (Wild) 5, Robert Kendrick/John McEnroe (Sportimes) 2 * WS: Eugenie Bouchard (Wild) 5, Anna-Lena Grönefeld (Sportimes) 2 * MS: John McEroe (Sportimes) 5, Jim Courier (Wild) 4 * XD: Darija Jurak/Aisam-ul-Haq Qureshi (Wild) 5, Květa Peschke/John McEnroe (Sportimes) 4 * WD: Anna-Lena Grönefeld/Květa Peschke (Sportimes) 5, Eugenie Bouchard/Darija Jurak (Wild) 2 * OT – WD: Anna-Lena Grönefeld/Květa Peschke (Sportimes) 2, Eugenie Bouchard/Darija Jurak (Wild) 1	4–8
13	July 23	Sportime Stadium at Randall's Island; New York, New York	Washington Kastles 23, NEW YORK SPORTIMES 15 (overtime) * MD: Frederik Nielsen/Bobby Reynolds (Kastles) 5, Robert Kendrick/Jesse Witten (Sportimes) 3 * WS: Anastasia Rodionova (Kastles) 5, Anna-Lena Grönefeld (Sportimes) 1 * MS: Bobby Reynolds (Kastles) 5, Jesse Witten (Sportimes) 3 * XD: Martina Hingis/Frederik Nielsen (Kastles) 5, Květa Peschke/Jesse Witten (Sportimes) 3 * WD: Anna-Lena Grönefeld/Květa Peschke (Sportimes) 5, Martina Hingis/Anastasia Rodionova (Kastles) 2 * OT – WD: Martina Hingis/Anastasia Rodionova (Kastles) 1, Anna-Lena Grönefeld/Květa Peschke (Sportimes) 0	4–9
14	July 24	The Pavilion; Radnor Township, Pennsylvania	PHILADELPHIA FREEDOMS 20, New York Sportimes 11 * MS: Samuel Groth (Freedoms) 5, Jesse Witten (Sportimes) 3 * WD: Anna-Lena Grönefeld/Květa Peschke (Sportimes) 5, Brooke Austin/Sachia Vickery (Freedoms) 0 * XD: Brooke Austin/Jordan Kerr (Freedoms) 5, Květa Peschke/John McEnroe (Sportimes) 1 * WS: Brooke Austin (Freedoms) 5, Květa Peschke (Sportimes) 2 * MD: Samuel Groth/Jordan Kerr (Freedoms) 5, Robert Kendrick/John McEnroe (Sportimes) 0	4–10

== Team personnel ==
=== Players and coaches ===
- (United States) Claude Okin, Coach
- (United States) James Blake (Note: Since James Blake was a wildcard player, and each WTT team can only have one wildcard player of each gender, he was effectively released on July 18, 2013, when the Sportimes designated John McEnroe as their male wildcard player.)
- (Germany) Anna-Lena Grönefeld
- (United States) Robert Kendrick
- (United States) John McEnroe
- (Czech Republic) Květa Peschke
- (United States) Eric Quigley (Note: Player appeared in fewer than three matches during the season as a substitute player and was not eligible to be protected in the draft the following year.)
- (United States) Abigail Spears
- (United States) Jesse Witten

=== Front office ===
- (United States) Claude Okin, CEO
- (United States) Jed Murray, General Manager
- (United States) Dan Fromm, Assistant General Manager

== Transactions ==
- February 13, 2013: The Sportimes left John McEnroe unprotected in the marquee player draft effectively making him a free agent.
- March 11, 2013: The Sportimes signed John McEnroe as a wildcard player.
- March 12, 2013: The Sportimes traded the rights to Martina Hingis to the Washington Kastles for financial consideration.
- March 12, 2013: The Sportimes acquired the rights to Anna-Lena Grönefeld in a trade with the Orange County Breakers in exchange for financial consideration.
- March 12, 2013: The Sportimes left Ashley Harkleroad unprotected in the roster player draft effectively making her a free agent.
- July 7, 2013: The Sportimes re-signed Abigail Spears as a substitute player.
- July 11, 2013: The Sportimes signed James Blake as a wildcard player, resulting in the effective release of John McEnroe.
- July 12, 2013: The Sportimes signed Eric Quigley as a substitute player.
- July 18, 2013: The Sportimes' designation of John McEnroe as their male wildcard player results in the effective release of James Blake.

== See also ==
- 2013 World TeamTennis season
