= 2014 Boston Lobsters season =

- Conference: 3rd Eastern

Record
- 2014 record: 1 win, 13 losses
- Home record: 1 win, 6 losses
- Road record: 0 wins, 7 losses
- Games won–lost: 189–322

Team info
- Owner(s): Bahar Uttam
- President/CEO: Bahar Uttam
- General manager: Darlene Hayes
- Coach: Robert Greene
- Stadium: Boston Lobsters Tennis Center at the Manchester Athletic Club (capacity: 1,634)

The 2014 Boston Lobsters season was the tenth season of the franchise (in its current incarnation) in World TeamTennis (WTT).

The Lobsters had 1 win and 13 losses and finished last in the Eastern Conference. They did not qualify for the playoffs.

== Season recap ==
=== Greene hired as coach ===
On January 9, 2014, the Lobsters announced that Robert Greene had been hired as the team's new head coach replacing Bud Schultz. Greene was formerly chairman of the United States Tennis Association Olympic Tennis Committee and responsible for the 2008 United States Olympic Tennis Team. Schultz had been the Lobsters head coach since the 2009 season.

=== James Blake trades ===
The Lobsters apparently acquired James Blake who played for the New York Sportimes in 2013, in a trade not revealed to the public until February 11, 2014, when Boston traded Blake to the Springfield Lasers for undisclosed consideration. Blake was not drafted in 2013, and played one match for the Sportimes as a wildcard player. However, John McEnroe appeared for the Sportimes later in the season as a wildcard player as well. Since WTT teams can have only one wildcard player of each gender, the designation of McEnroe as a wildcard player by the Sportimes resulted in their effective release of Blake. With Blake registering for the 2014 marquee player draft, under WTT rules the right to protect him would have reverted to the Philadelphia Freedoms who drafted him as a marquee player in 2012. Therefore, the apparent unreported trade took place between the Lobsters and the Freedoms between the end of the 2012 season and the 2014 marquee player draft.

=== Marquee player draft ===
Since the Lobsters had the worse record of the two conference championship match losers in 2013 at 5 wins and 9 losses, they had the fourth-to-last (fifth) selection in each round of the WTT Marquee Player Draft. The Lobsters passed on making any selections at the marquee player draft.

=== Isner returns to Lobsters ===
On March 4, 2014, the Lobsters re-signed John Isner, the top-ranked American male player at the time, as a wildcard player. Isner had previously played for the Lobsters from 2010 to 2012. Upon announcement of the signing, Isner said, "I'm excited to return to play for the Boston Lobsters. I love being part of a team and I'm looking forward to playing in front of the great Lobsters fans."

=== Roster player draft ===
After the contraction of the Las Vegas Neon, the Lobsters moved up to the fourth selection in each round of the Roster Player Draft. The Lobsters protected Eric Butorac and drafted Sharon Fichman, Megan Moulton-Levy and 2005 WTT Male Rookie of the Year and 2007 WTT Championship Most Valuable Player Rik de Voest in the WTT Roster Player Draft. De Voest had been left unprotected by the Springfield Lasers.

=== Other free agent player signings ===
On July 7, 2014, the Lobsters signed Caitlin Whoriskey as a substitute player.

On July 12, 2014, the Lobsters re-signed Coco Vandeweghe as a substitute player. She had previously played for the team in 2010 and 2011.

On July 18, 2014, the Lobsters signed Scott Lipsky as a substitute player.

On July 21, 2014, the Lobsters signed James Cerretani as a substitute player.

On July 22, 2014, the Lobsters signed Julia Cohen as a substitute player.

=== Struggles on the court ===
The Lobsters struggled throughout the entire season. They lost all five sets in five of their matches and also failed to win at least 10 games five times.

After starting the season with six straight losses, the Lobsters broke through for their only win of the season on July 15, 2014, at home against the Austin Aces. Boston raced out to a 10–0 lead by sweeping all five games in each of the first two sets. Rik de Voest opened the match with a set win in men's singles. Sharon Fichman and Megan Moulton-Levy followed by taking the women's doubles. The Aces responded with a furious comeback attempt winning the next three sets to send the match to overtime with he Lobsters leading, 19–15. After dropping the first three games of overtime, Moulton-Levy and de Voest were one game away from facing a super tiebreaker when they won the fourth game to seal a 20–18 victory. The pair of 5–0 set wins to open the match were the only two sets in which the Lobsters blanked their opponent during the entire season.

The Lobsters ended the season with a seven-match losing streak and a 16-set losing streak. They finished with 1 win and 13 losses, the worst record in WTT. The Lobsters were the only team in the league that failed to win at least 200 games and the only WTT team to lose at least 300 games. Every other team in the league won at least six matches.

== Event chronology ==
- January 9, 2014: The Lobsters announced that Robert Greene had been hired as the team's new head coach replacing Bud Schultz.
- February 11, 2014: The Lobsters traded James Blake, whom had earlier been acquired from the Philadelphia Freedoms in an unannounced transaction, to the Springfield Lasers for undisclosed consideration.
- March 4, 2014: The Lobsters re-signed free agent John Isner as a wildcard player.
- March 11, 2014: The Lobsters protected Eric Butorac and drafted Sharon Fichman, Megan Moulton-Levy and Rik de Voest in the WTT Roster Player Draft.
- July 7, 2014: The Lobsters signed Caitlin Whoriskey as a substitute player.
- July 12, 2014: The Lobsters re-signed Coco Vandeweghe as a substitute player.
- July 18, 2014: The Lobsters signed Scott Lipsky as a substitute player.
- July 19, 2014: With a record of 1 win and 9 losses, the Lobsters were eliminated from playoff contention when they lost to the Washington Kastles, 23–9.
- July 21, 2014: The Lobsters signed James Cerretani as a substitute player.
- July 22, 2014: The Lobsters signed Julia Cohen as a substitute player.

== Draft picks ==
Since the Lobsters had the worse record of the two conference championship match losers in 2013, they had the fourth-to-last (fifth) selection in each round of the WTT Marquee Player Draft and moved up to fourth in the Roster Player Draft after WTT contracted the Las Vegas Neon.

=== Marquee player draft ===
The Wild passed on making any selections at the WTT Marquee Player Draft.

Round	No.	Overall	Player chosen	Prot?
1	5	5	Pass	–
2	5	13	Pass	–

=== Roster player draft ===
The Lobsters protected Eric Butorac and drafted Sharon Fichman, Megan Moulton-Levy and Rik de Voest in the WTT Roster Player Draft. The selections made by the Lobsters are shown in the table below.

Round	No.	Overall	Player chosen	Prot?
1	4	4	Sharon Fichman	N
2	4	11	Eric Butorac	Y
3	4	18	Megan Moulton-Levy	N
4	4	25	Rik de Voest	N

== Match log ==
Legend
Lobsters Win	Lobsters Loss
Home team in CAPS

Match	Date	Venue and location	Result and details	Record
1	July 6	Boston Lobsters Tennis Center at the Manchester Athletic Club; Manchester-by-the-Sea, Massachusetts	Texas Wild 23, BOSTON LOBSTERS 14 (overtime) * MS: Alex Bogomolov, Jr. (Wild) 5, Rik de Voest (Lobsters) 2 * WD: Darija Jurak/Anabel Medina Garrigues (Wild) 5, Sharon Fichman/Megan Moulton-Levy (Lobsters) 4 * XD: Anabel Medina Garrigues/Aisam Qureshi (Wild) 5, Megan Moulton-Levy/Eric Butorac (Lobsters) 2 * WS: Anabel Medina Garrigues (Wild) 5, Megan Moulton-Levy (Lobsters) 1 *** Megan Moulton-Levy substituted for Sharon Fichman at 0–1 * MD: Eric Butorac/Rik de Voest (Lobsters) 5, Alex Bogomolov, Jr./Aisam Qureshi (Wild) 2 * OT – MD: Alex Bogomolov, Jr./Aisam Qureshi (Wild) 1, Eric Butorac/Rik de Voest (Lobsters) 0	0–1
2	July 7	Boston Lobsters Tennis Center at the Manchester Athletic Club; Manchester-by-the-Sea, Massachusetts	Washington Kastles 24, BOSTON LOBSTERS 16 (overtime) * MD: Leander Paes/Bobby Reynolds (Kastles) 5, Eric Butorac/Rik de Voest (Lobsters) 4 * WD: Jarmila Gajdošová/Anastasia Rodionova (Kastles) 5, Megan Moulton-Levy/Caitlin Whoriskey (Lobsters) 2 * MS: Bobby Reynolds (Kastles) 5, Rik de Voest (Lobsters) 3 * WS: Anastasia Rodionova (Kastles) 5, Caitlin Whoriskey (Lobsters) 1 * XD: Megan Moulton-Levy/Eric Butorac (Lobsters) 5, Jarmila Gajdošová/Leander Paes (Kastles) 3 * OT – XD: Jarmila Gajdošová/Leander Paes (Kastles) 1, Megan Moulon-Levy/Eric Butorac (Lobsters) 1	0–2
3	July 9	Kastles Stadium at the Charles E. Smith Center; Washington, District of Columbia	WASHINGTON KASTLES 25, Boston Lobsters 8 * XD: Martina Hingis/Leander Paes (Kastles) 5, Megan Moulton-Levy/Eric Butorac (Lobsters) 1 * WS: Martina Hingis (Kastles) 5, Caitlin Whoriskey (Lobsters) 0 * MS: Kevin Anderson (Kastles) 5, Rik de Voest (Lobsters) 1 * WD: Martina Hingis/Anastasia Rodionova (Kastles) 5, Megan Moulton-Levy/Caitlin Whoriskey (Lobsters) 2 * MD: Bobby Reynolds/Leander Paes (Kastles) 5, Eric Butorac/Rik de Voest (Lobsters) 4; ***Bobby Reynolds substituted for Kevin Anderson at 0–1	0–3
4	July 10	Boston Lobsters Tennis Center at the Manchester Athletic Club; Manchester-by-the-Sea, Massachusetts	Springfield Lasers 23, BOSTON LOBSTERS 13 (overtime) * WD: Līga Dekmeijere/Olga Govortsova (Lasers) 5, Megan Moulton-Levy/Caitlin Whoriskey (Lobsters) 1 * MS: Michael Russell (Lasers) 5, Rik de Voest (Lobsters) 1 * WS: Olga Govortsova (Lasers) 5, Caitlin Whoriskey (Lobsters) 0 * XD: Caitlin Whoriskey/Eric Butorac (Lobsters) 5, Olga Govortsova/Jean Andersen (Lasers) 4 *** Caitlin Whoriskey substituted for Megan Moulton-Levy at 4–3 * MD: Eric Butorac/Rik de Voest (Lobsters) 5, Jean Andersen/Michael Russell (Lasers) 3 * OT - MD: Jean Andersen/Michael Russell (Lasers) 1, Eric Butorac/Rik de Voest (Lobsters) 1	0–4
5	July 12	Valley View Casino Center; San Diego, California	SAN DIEGO AVIATORS 21, Boston Lobsters 19 (overtime) * MS: Rik de Voest (Lobsters) 5, Somdev Devvarman (Aviators) 3 * WS: Coco Vandeweghe (Lobsters) 5, Daniela Hantuchová (Aviators) 4 * MD: Somdev Devvarman/Raven Klaasen (Aviators) 5, Eric Butorac/Rik de Voest (Lobsters) 3 * WD: Daniela Hantuchová/Květa Peschke (Aviators) 5, Megan Moulton-Levy/Coco Vandeweghe (Lobsters) 1 * XD: Megan Moulton-Levy/Eric Butorac (Lobsters) 5, Květa Peschke/Raven Klaasen (Aviators) 3 * OT – XD: Květa Peschke/Raven Klaasen (Aviators) 1, Megan Moulton-Levy/Eric Butorac (Lobsters) 0	0–5
6	July 14	Cedar Park Center; Cedar Park, Texas	AUSTIN ACES 22, Boston Lobsters 18 * MS: Andy Roddick (Aces) 5, Rik de Voest (Lobsters) 2 * MD: Treat Huey/Andy Roddick (Aces) 5, Eric Butorac/Rik de Voest (Lobsters) 3 * XD: Megan Moulton-Levy/Eric Butorac (Lobsters) 5, Marion Bartoli/Treat Huey (Aces) 3 * WD: Sharon Fichman/Megan Moulton-Levy (Lobsters) 5, Marion Bartoli/Vera Zvonareva (Aces) 4 * WS: Vera Zvonareva (Aces) 5, Sharon Fichman (Lobsters) 3	0–6
7	July 15	Boston Lobsters Tennis Center at the Manchester Athletic Club; Manchester-by-the-Sea, Massachusetts	BOSTON LOBSTERS 20, Austin Aces 18 (overtime) * MS: Rik de Voest (Lobsters) 5, John-Patrick Smith (Aces) 0 * WD: Sharon Fichman/Megan Moulton-Levy (Lobsters) 5, Eva Hrdinová/Vera Zvonareva (Aces) 0 * MD: Treat Huey/John-Patrick Smith (Aces) 5, Eric Butorac/Rik de Voest (Lobsters) 3 * WS: Vera Zvonareva (Aces) 5, Sharon Fichman (Lobsters) 2 * XD: Eva Hrdinová/Treat Huey (Aces) 5, Megan Moulton-Levy/Rik de Voest (Lobsters) 4 *** Rik de Voest substituted for Eric Butorac at 3–2 * OT – XD: Eva Hrdinová/Treat Huey (Aces) 3, Megan Moulton-Levy/Rik de Voest (Lobsters) 1	1–6
8	July 16	Boston Lobsters Tennis Center at the Manchester Athletic Club; Manchester-by-the-Sea, Massachusetts	San Diego Aviators 20, BOSTON LOBSTERS 15 (overtime) * MS: Rik de Voest (Lobsters) 5, Somdev Devvarman (Aviators) 2 * WD: Daniela Hantuchová/Květa Peschke (Aviators) 5, Sharon Fichman/Megan Moulton-Levy (Lobsters) 3 * MD: Somdev Devvarman/Raven Klaasen (Aviators) 5, Eric Butorac/Rik de Voest (Lobsters) 2 * WS: Daniela Hantuchová (Aviators) 5, Sharon Fichman (Lobsters) 0 * XD: Sharon Fichman/Eric Butorac (Lobsters) 5, Raven Klaasen/Květa Peschke (Aviators) 2 * OT – XD: Raven Klaasen/Květa Peschke (Aviators) 1, Sharon Fichman/Eric Butorac (Lobsters) 0	1–7
9	July 18	The Pavilion; Radnor Township, Pennsylvania	PHILADELPHIA FREEDOMS 25, Boston Lobsters 14 * MS: Frank Dancevic (Freedoms) 5, Rik de Voest (Lobsters) 4 * WD: Liezel Huber/Taylor Townsend (Freedoms) 5, Sharon Fichman/Megan Moulton-Levy (Lobsters) 2 * XD: Liezel Huber/Marcelo Melo (Freedoms) 5, Megan Moulton-Levy/Scott Lipsky (Lobsters) 2 * WS: Taylor Townsend (Freedoms) 5, Sharon Fichman (Lobsters) 2 * MD: Frank Dancevic/Marcelo Melo (Freedoms) 5, Rik de Voest/Scott Lipsky (Lobsters) 4	1–8
10	July 19	Boston Lobsters Tennis Center at the Manchester Athletic Club; Manchester-by-the-Sea, Massachusetts	Washington Kastles 23, BOSTON LOBSTERS 9 * MS: Bobby Reynolds (Kastles) 5, Rik de Voest (Lobsters) 1 * WS: Anastasia Rodionova (Kastles) 5, Sharon Fichman (Lobsters) 1 * MD: Rik de Voest/Scott Lipsky (Lobsters) 5, Leander Paes/Bobby Reynolds (Kastles) 3 * WD: Anastasia Rodionova/Shelby Rogers (Kastles) 5, Sharon Fichman/Megan Moulton-Levy (Lobsters) 1 * XD: Anastasia Rodionova/Leander Paes (Kastles) 5, Sharon Fichman/Scott Lipsky (Lobsters) 1	1–9
11	July 20	Boston Lobsters Tennis Center at the Manchester Athletic Club; Manchester-by-the-Sea, Massachusetts	Philadelphia Freedoms 23, BOSTON LOBSTERS 21 * MS: Frank Dancevic (Freedoms) 5, John Isner (Lobsters) 4 * WD: Liezel Huber/Taylor Townsend (Freedoms) 5, Sharon Fichman/Megan Moulton-Levy (Lobsters) 4 * XD: Liezel Huber/Marcelo Melo (Freedoms) 5, Sharon Fichman/John Isner (Lobsters) 4 *** Sharon Fichman substituted for Megan Moulton-Levy at 2–3 * WS: Sharon Fichman (Lobsters) 5, Taylor Townsend (Freedoms) 3 * MD: Frank Dancevic/Marcelo Melo (Freedoms) 5, Rik de Voest/John Isner (Lobsters) 4	1–10
12	July 21	Kastles Stadium at the Charles E. Smith Center; Washington, District of Columbia	WASHINGTON KASTLES 25, Boston Lobsters 9 * MS: Bobby Reynolds (Kastles) 5, Rik de Voest (Lobsters) 1 * WS: Martina Hingis (Kastles) 5, Megan Moulton-Levy (Lobsters) 4 * MD: Leander Paes/Bobby Reynolds (Kastles) 5, James Cerretani/Rik de Voest (Lobsters) 0 * WD: Martina Hingis/Anastasia Rodionova (Kastles) 5, Sharon Fichman/Megan Moulton-Levy (Lobsters) 0 (forfeit) *** Sharon Fichman suffered an injury to her left knee during pre-match warm-ups and was unable to play. With no female substitute player available, the Lobsters were forced to forfeit the women's doubles set. * XD: Martina Hingis/Leander Paes (Kastles) 5, Megan Moulton-Levy/James Cerretani (Lobsters) 4	1–11
13	July 22	The Pavilion; Radnor Township, Pennsylvania	PHILADELPHIA FREEDOMS 25, Boston Lobsters 6 * MS: Frank Dancevic (Freedoms) 5, Rik de Voest (Lobsters) 3 * WS: Taylor Townsend (Freedoms) 5, Julia Cohen (Lobsters) 0 * MD: Frank Dancevic/Marcelo Melo (Freedoms) 5, Rik de Voest/James Cerretani (Lobsters) 2 * WD: Liezel Huber/Taylor Townsend (Freedoms) 5, Julia Cohen/Megan Moulton-Levy (Lobsters) 0 * XD: Liezel Huber/Marcelo Melo (Freedoms) 5, Megan Moulton-Levy/James Cerretani (Lobsters) 1	1–12
14	July 23	Mediacom Stadium at Cooper Tennis Complex; Springfield, Missouri	SPRINGFIELD LASERS 25, Boston Lobsters 7 * MD: Ross Hutchins/Michael Russell (Lasers) 5, James Cerretani/Rik de Voest (Lobsters) 1 * WD: Olga Govortsova/Abigail Spears (Lasers) 5, Julia Cohen/Megan Moulton-Levy (Lobsters) 0 * XD: Abigail Spears/Ross Hutchins (Lasers) 5, Megan Moulton-Levy/James Cerretani (Lobsters) 2 * WS: Olga Govortsova (Lasers) 5, Megan Moulton-Levy (Lobsters) 0 *** Megan Moulton-Levy substituted for Julia Cohen at 0–2 * MS: Michael Russell (Lasers) 5, Rik de Voest (Lobsters) 4	1–13

== Team personnel ==
=== On-court personnel ===
- (United States) Robert Greene – Head Coach
- (United States) Eric Butorac
- (United States) James Cerretani
- (United States) Julia Cohen (Note: Player appeared in fewer than three matches during the season as a substitute player and was not eligible to be protected in the following year's draft.)
- (South Africa) Rik de Voest
- (Canada) Sharon Fichman
- (United States) John Isner
- (United States) Scott Lipsky
- (United States) Megan Moulton-Levy
- (United States) Coco Vandeweghe
- (United States) Caitlin Whoriskey

=== Front office ===
- Bahar Uttam – Owner and CEO
- Darlene Hayes – General Manager

== Statistics ==
Players are listed in order of their game-winning percentage provided they played in at least 40% of the Lobsters' games in that event, which is the WTT minimum for qualification for league leaders in individual statistical categories.

Men's singles

Player	GP	GW	GL	PCT	A	DF	BPW	BPP	BP%	3APW	3APP	3AP%
Rik de Voest	92	37	55	.402	4	9	12	23	.522	10	20	.500
John Isner	9	4	5	.444	2	3	0	0	–	1	1	1.000
Total	101	41	60	.406	6	12	12	23	.522	11	21	.524

Women's singles

Player	GP	GW	GL	PCT	A	DF	BPW	BPP	BP%	3APW	3APP	3AP%
Sharon Fichman	42	13	29	.310	0	6	4	12	.333	4	12	.333
Coco Vandeweghe	9	5	4	.556	5	1	1	2	.500	0	2	.000
Megan Moulton-Levy	17	5	12	.294	1	2	1	5	.200	1	4	.250
Caitlin Whoriskey	16	1	15	.063	3	5	0	0	–	0	1	.000
Julia Cohen	7	0	7	.000	0	0	0	0	–	0	0	–
Total	91	24	67	.264	9	14	6	19	.316	5	19	.263

Men's doubles

Player	GP	GW	GL	PCT	A	DF	BPW	BPP	BP%	3APW	3APP	3AP%
Eric Butorac	67	30	37	.448	6	5	6	13	.462	9	17	.529
Rik de Voest	111	46	65	.414	8	8	11	34	.324	11	32	.344
Scott Lipsky	17	9	8	.529	2	0	4	9	.444	1	4	.250
John Isner	9	4	5	.444	2	0	1	9	.111	1	4	.250
James Cerretani	18	3	15	.167	1	6	0	3	.000	0	7	.000
Total	111	46	65	.414	19	19	11	34	.324	11	32	.344

Women's doubles

Player	GP	GW	GL	PCT	A	DF	BPW	BPP	BP%	3APW	3APP	3AP%
Sharon Fichman	58	24	34	.414	1	1	11	15	.733	7	11	.636
Megan Moulton-Levy	94	30	64	.319	0	5	11	29	.379	10	21	.476
Caitlin Whoriskey	20	5	15	.250	0	1	0	9	.000	2	7	.286
Coco Vandeweghe	6	1	5	.167	0	1	0	0	–	1	1	1.000
Julia Cohen	10	0	10	.000	0	3	0	5	.000	0	2	.000
Total	94	30	64	.319	1	11	11	29	.379	10	21	.476

Mixed doubles

Player	GP	GW	GL	PCT	A	DF	BPW	BPP	BP%	3APW	3APP	3AP%
Eric Butorac	62	32	30	.516	6	5	9	19	.474	15	24	.625
Megan Moulton-Levy	94	39	55	.415	3	10	9	22	.409	18	32	.563
Caitlin Whoriskey	2	1	1	.500	0	1	0	0	–	0	1	.000
Sharon Fichman	18	8	10	.444	0	0	3	4	.750	4	5	.800
John Isner	9	4	5	.444	0	0	1	3	.333	2	3	.667
James Cerretani	22	7	15	.318	0	3	1	1	1.000	4	7	.571
Rik de Voest	8	2	6	.250	0	1	0	2	.000	0	2	.000
Scott Lipsky	13	3	10	.231	0	0	1	1	1.000	1	2	.500
Total	114	48	66	.421	9	20	12	26	.462	22	38	.579

Team totals

Event	GP	GW	GL	PCT	A	DF	BPW	BPP	BP%	3APW	3APP	3AP%
Men's singles	101	41	60	.406	6	12	12	23	.522	11	21	.524
Women's singles	91	24	67	.264	9	14	6	19	.316	5	19	.263
Men's doubles	111	46	65	.414	19	19	11	34	.324	11	32	.344
Women's doubles	94	30	64	.319	1	11	11	29	.379	10	21	.476
Mixed doubles	114	48	66	.421	9	20	12	26	.462	22	38	.579
Total	511	189	322	.370	44	76	52	131	.397	59	131	.450

== Transactions ==
- January 9, 2014: The Lobsters hired Robert Greene as the team's new head coach replacing Bud Schultz.
- February 11, 2014: The Lobsters traded James Blake, whom had earlier been acquired from the Philadelphia Freedoms in an unannounced transaction, to the Springfield Lasers for undisclosed consideration.
- February 11, 2014: The Lobsters left Mark Philippoussis unprotected in the WTT Marquee Player Draft effectively making him a free agent.
- March 4, 2014: The Lobsters re-signed John Isner as a wildcard player.
- March 11, 2014: The Lobsters protected Eric Butorac and drafted Sharon Fichman, Megan Moulton-Levy and Rik de Voest in the WTT Roster Player Draft.
- March 11, 2014: The Lobsters left Jill Craybas, Amir Weintraub, Paola Suárez and Katalin Marosi unprotected in the WTT Roster Player Draft effectively making them all free agents. The Lobsters had traded up (for financial consideration) in the 2013 draft to select Suárez. However, she suffered an injury before the start of the 2013 season and never played for the team.
- July 7, 2014: The Lobsters signed Caitlin Whoriskey as a substitute player.
- July 12, 2014: The Lobsters re-signed Coco Vandeweghe as a substitute player.
- July 18, 2014: The Lobsters signed Scott Lipsky as a substitute player.
- July 21, 2014: The Lobsters signed James Cerretani as a substitute player.
- July 22, 2014: The Lobsters signed Julia Cohen as a substitute player.

== Charitable support ==
During each night of the 2014 season, the WTT team with the most aces received US$1,000 toward a local charity of the team's choice as part of a program called Mylan Aces. In the case of a tie, the award was split accordingly. The Lobsters earned $500 for Education Outbound through the program.
