= Josh Cohen (tennis) =

- Full name: Josh Cohen
- Born: September 17, 1984 (age 42) Philadelphia, Pennsylvania, U.S.
- College: University of Miami

Josh Cohen (born September 17, 1984) is an American tennis player and coach. A Philadelphia native, he starred at University of Miami where he was an All-American and later was the head coach of the Philadelphia Freedoms of World TeamTennis.

== Juniors career ==
Cohen was ranked top-ten in the world in juniors, and ranked No. 1 nationally in every USTA age group from the 12s through the 18s. He competed in all four Grand Slams, reaching the quarterfinals of the French Open Junior Championships as well as the U.S. Open Round of 16. Cohen finished his juniors career ranked No. 19 in the world.

== Collegiate career ==
Cohen played collegiate tennis at the University of Miami. Cohen graduated with Dean's List and All-American honors, becoming the winningest player in program history. He finished his collegiate career ranked No. 18 in the nation for singles, and No. 3 for doubles. Cohen was a first-team All-ACC and Big East selection.

== Post-College ==
After graduating from Miami, Cohen went on to serve as the Assistant Coach at the University of Pennsylvania for a number of years.

Cohen has competed as a player in World TeamTennis for the Delaware Smash and Philadelphia Freedoms. Cohen is known for his mental toughness and competitiveness.

In February 2012, Cohen was named the head coach of the Philadelphia Freedoms. Freedoms owner Billie Jean King introduced Cohen as the new head coach at the Freedoms kick off event “Battle at the Green Valley.” Cohen's 2012 Freedoms squad included James Blake, Ryan Harrison, and Mark Philippoussis.

== Halls of fame ==
In 2013, Cohen was inducted into the Philadelphia Jewish Sports Hall of Fame.

== Personal life ==
Cohen comes from a tennis family, his sister Julia Cohen currently competes on the WTA circuit, having been ranked as high as No. 97 in the world in WTA singles. In 2007, the Cohen family set a national record after winning consecutive United States father-and-son and father-and-daughter USTA National Championships. Josh coaches his sister whenever she is in town.
