= Kastles Stadium at The Wharf =

Tennis stadium in Washington, D.C.

- Interactive map of Kastles Stadium at The Wharf
- Location: 800 Water Street SW, Washington, D.C., United States
- Coordinates: 38°52′45.92″N 77°1′30.25″W
- Capacity: 3,000

Construction
- Built: 2011
- Opened: June 14, 2011
- Closed: 2013
- Demolished: June 14, 2014

Tenant
- Washington Kastles

The Kastles Stadium at The Wharf was a tennis stadium on the Southwest Waterfront in Washington, D.C. Built in 2011, the stadium was the home venue for the Washington Kastles tennis team. The stadium was opened on June 14, 2011, with a ribbon-cutting ceremony attended by Billie Jean King, Ilana Kloss, District of Columbia mayor Vincent Gray, and others. The Kastles opened their 2011 season on July 5 at the stadium playing against the Kansas City Explorers.

Following the Kastles' 2013 season, the stadium was closed to make way for the redevelopment of Washington's waterfront area. The Kastles moved to the Charles E. Smith Center for the 2014 season.
