= Manchester Athletic Club =

- Location within Massachusetts
- Type: Athletic club
- Location: Manchester-by-the-Sea, Massachusetts
- Coordinates: 42°35′29″N 70°45′42″W
- Elevation: 67 feet (20 m)
- Opened: 1973
- Operator: Blue Sky Holdings, Inc.
- Open: Monday to Thursday: 6:00 AM – 10:00 pm Friday: 6:00 AM – 9:00 PM; Saturday: 7:00 AM – 7:00 PM; Sunday: 7:00 AM – 6:00 PM
- Awards: 2012 Top 100 Clubs in America
- Parking: on premises
- Website: macbythesea.com

The Manchester Athletic Club (also known as MAC) is an athletic club located in Manchester-by-the-Sea, Massachusetts with an entrance at 8 Atwater Avenue. The club has seven indoor tennis courts and five outdoor courts, including a stadium court and four courts which are bubbled during the winter months. The tennis academy is a USTA Certified Regional Training Center and has some of New England's best coaches. MAC also has a large, two-story gym with a variety of equipment, an indoor pool, an outdoor pool, a training turf, a field, an indoor sport court, and an outdoor sport court. It is close by to several running/walking trails and just minutes away from downtown Manchester-by-the-Sea. The athletic club offers individual tennis and fitness lessons, group tennis and fitness lessons, junior tennis academies and camps, junior fitness training camps and a Sports Performance Institute as well as a variety of junior summer camps.

The Boston Lobsters Tennis Center, home of the Boston Lobsters of World TeamTennis from 2005 through 2015, is located on the club grounds. The stadium has a seating capacity of 1,634 people. On February 17, 2016, WTT announced that the Lobsters would cease operations.

== Awards ==
In 2012, Club Industry named Blue Sky Holdings, Inc., the parent company of the Manchester Athletic Club, to the list of the Top 100 Clubs in the United States.
