= Philadelphia Freedoms =

World TeamTennis franchise

- Sport: Team tennis
- Founded: 2001
- League: World TeamTennis
- Team history: Philadelphia Freedoms; 1974, 2001–2021
- Based in: Philadelphia
- Stadium: Cabrini College (2001–2007); King of Prussia Mall (2008–2009); Finneran Pavilion (2010–2016); Michael J. Hagan Arena (2017–2021)
- Colors: Bright Venetian red, white, international Klein blue
- Owner: Billie Jean King
- Head coach: Craig Kardon
- Championships: 2001, 2006
- Mascot: Nettie King

The Philadelphia Freedoms was a tennis team competing in World TeamTennis (WTT).

== Overview ==
The team traces its origins to WTT's inaugural season, in 1974. The original team starred tennis legend and social pioneer Billie Jean King, who had beaten Bobby Riggs in the "Battle of the Sexes" the previous year.

Other members of the team were: Fred Stolle (Australia), Brian Fairlie (New Zealand), Buster Mottram (UK), Julie Anthony (US), Tory Ann Fretz (US), Betsy Nagelsen (US) and Kathy Kuykendall (US).

Julie Anthony later married the owner of the team, Dick Butera, and they settled in Aspen, Colorado, where she practices as a sports psychologist. Nagelsen married the late Mark McCormack, the founder and chairman of International Management Group. McCormack who represented Tiger Woods and Michael Jordan amongst others, was often referred to as one of the most powerful men in sports. Mottram was a controversial figure who spoke publicly about his extreme right wing views and made unsuccessful attempts to become a Conservative candidate for the British Parliament. Stolle was inducted into the International Tennis Hall of Fame in 1985. Fretz was inducted into the Intercollegiate Tennis Hall of Fame in 1999.

Pop singer Elton John was a friend of Billie Jean King's, and was invited to participate in a promotional match during one of the team's games. In return, he was later inspired to write a song about King, also called "Philadelphia Freedom." In 1974, the Freedoms had the league's best regular-season record, but were upset by the Denver Racquets in the championship game. The following year, the Freedoms merged with the Boston Lobsters.

Logo used by the Freedoms in 1974 and from 2001 to 2007.

The most recent team joined WTT in 2001. Before the beginning of the 2008 season, the Philadelphia Freedoms announced they would be leaving their previous home at Cabrini College. Their home matches would be played at a temporary tennis stadium that seated 3,000 in a parking lot outside the King of Prussia Mall in King of Prussia, Pennsylvania (located near Philadelphia) from 2008 to 2009. From 2010 to 2016, the Freedoms played their home matches at The Pavilion on the campus of Villanova University. In 2017, the Freedoms home court moved to Hagan Arena on the campus of Saint Joseph's University, returning to play within the City of Philadelphia for the first time since 1974. WorldTeamTennis ceased operations in 2021, with hopes of a reboot in the future but this has not yet happened.

== Last roster ==
- (United States) Craig Kardon, Head Coach
- (United States) Caroline Dolehide
- (United States) Taylor Townsend
- (France) Fabrice Martin
- (United States) Taylor Fritz
- (United States) Raquel Atawo
- (United States) Donald Young

== 2019 season ==
During the 2019 WTT draft, the Freedoms protected Taylor Townsend, Fabrice Martin and Raquel Atawo. The Freedoms also drafted Adrian Menendez-Maceiras with the 7th pick in the first round.

Later, the Freedoms signed Donald Young who was the 2017 French Open men's doubles finalist, Danielle Collins who was a Seminfalist at the 2019 Australian Open, Grigor Dimitrov who has eight ATP Tour titles to his name, and Tommy Paul, who was #129th in the world in men's singles at the time of his signing.

== 2018 season ==
Led by returning coach and Coach of the Year, Craig Karden, US Open (tennis) champion Sloane Stephens, WTT Male Rookie of the Year, Kevin King and returning fan favorite and WTT Female MVP Taylor Townsend, the Freedoms managed to put together a successful regular season by going 12-2 and qualifying for a spot in the championship.

While the Freedom's played their home games at Hagan Arena at St. Joe's, the championship game was held at the Daskalakis Athletic Center at Drexel University. The Freedoms took on the Springfield Lasers and lost the first two sets of the match in men's and women's doubles and went down 10–5 at the half. However, the Freedoms managed to re-take the lead 15-14 following two convincing wins in mixed doubles and a dominating woman's singles performance by Taylor Townsend. The championship came down to the final set in the form of men's singles where Kevin King took a 3–1 lead over Miomir Kecmanović. However, Kecmanović stormed back and won four straight games including a break of King twice to give Lasers a 19–18 victory and a Championship.

== 2017 season ==
Led by 2017 US Open (tennis) champion Sloane Stephens, 2017 International Tennis Hall of Fame inductee Andy Roddick and returning fan favorite Donald Young, the Freedoms played competitively, going into the final weekend of the season in playoff contention. Led by returning championship-winning coach Craig Kardon, the 2017 squad also featured familiar faces like Taylor Townsend (tennis), in her third season with the Freedoms, and 2016 World TeamTennis Male Rookie of the Year Fabrice Martin, returning to dominate in men's and mixed doubles for the second consecutive season. The 2017 season also featured the WTT debut of sensational rookie Darian King, the highest-ranked professional tennis player in the history of Barbados. Freedoms fans were thrilled by a visiting appearance from tennis great Venus Williams (Washington Kastles), who played in Philadelphia just weeks after reaching the final of the 2017 The Championships, Wimbledon.

== 2016 season ==
Led by recent world no. 1 Caroline Wozniacki, past junior world no. 1 Donald Young, and returning fan favorite CoCo Vandeweghe, the Freedoms finished with a winning record again in 2016. Led by fifth-year Head Coach Josh Cohen and returning Director of Player Development Craig Kardon, 6’5" Fabrice Martin and 6"2’ Naomi Broady were the top mixed doubles combination in World TeamTennis while Martin, Young, and Lukáš Lacko combined for the second-best men's doubles record in the league. Broady and rookie American Samantha Crawford were very competitive in women's doubles. Freedoms fans also enjoyed a visiting appearance from tennis great Andy Roddick (New York Empire (tennis).

== 2015 season ==
Once again, the Freedoms hosted seven home matches at the Villanova Pavilion. Serena Williams was drafted to play for the Washington Kastles at Philadelphia on July 20, 2015, but sustained an elbow injury that prevented her from playing. The Bryan brothers and Eugenie Bouchard played for the California Dream and the Boston Lobsters, respectively, at Philadelphia in the last two home matches.

The Freedoms made it into the Eastern Conference Finals against the Washington Kastles. In a game played on the Kastles' home court, the Freedoms lost 25-9 and fell short of making it into the championship match.

== 2014 season ==
The Philadelphia Freedoms played 14 regular season matches in the 2014 season, and hosted 7 of them at the Villanova Pavilion. Victoria Azarenka played for the Freedoms against the San Diego Aviators; Andy Roddick also made an appearance at a home match, playing for the Austin Aces.

The Freedoms made it into the playoffs but lost to the Washington Kastles before they could reach the Eastern Conference Finals, achieving their best season since 2007. Team member Marcelo Melo was named the 2014 WTT MVP.

== 2013 season ==
The Philadelphia Freedoms competed in 14 matches throughout the 2013 World TeamTennis season. They hosted seven home matches at the Villanova Pavilion featuring marquee players including: Andy Roddick, Sloane Stephens, John McEnroe, Martina Hingis and Bob and Mike Bryan. Coached by Josh Cohen, the Freedoms fell short of a playoff run and ended the 2013 season with a record of 5–9.

During the 2013 season, the Philadelphia Freedoms also welcomed a new member to their team. They unveiled their new mascot, Nettie, at their home opener against the Springfield Lasers with the help of World TeamTennis co-founder Billie Jean King.

== 2012 season ==
Freedoms logo 2010–2012

The Philadelphia Freedoms competed in the 2012 World TeamTennis season. The Freedoms hosted seven home matches at the Villanova Pavilion and competed in seven away matches. This season featured marquee players including: James Blake, Ryan Harrison, John McEnroe, Mark Philippoussis, Bob and Mike Bryan, and Martina Hingis. This was head coach Josh Cohen's first season leading the Freedoms. The Freedoms ended their season with a record of 5–9.

== Team rosters ==
=== 2019 roster ===
- (United States) Craig Kardon, Head Coach
- (Bulgaria) Grigor Dimitrov
- (Spain) Adrián Menéndez Maceiras
- (United States) Danielle Collins
- (United States) Donald Young
- (France) Fabrice Martin
- (United States) Raquel Atawo
- (United States) Taylor Townsend
- (France) Adrian Mannarino
- (Spain) Feliciano López
- (United States) Mitchell Krueger
- (United States) Tommy Paul

=== 2018 roster ===
- (United States) Craig Kardon, Head Coach
- (United States) Sloane Stephens
- (United States) Taylor Townsend
- (France) Fabrice Martin
- (South Africa) Kevin Anderson
- (United States) Raquel Atawo
- (United States) Kevin King
- (Canada) Gabriela Dabrowski (substitute)
- (United States) Jackson Withrow (substitute)

== Former Freedoms players ==
- Andre Agassi, 2009
- Prakash Amritraj, 2010
- James Blake, 2012
- Björn Borg, 2011
- Beatrice Capra, 2011
- Julia Cohen, 2011
- Jimmy Connors, 2001
- Ramón Delgado, 2010
- Joshua Eagle, 2004
- Brendan Evans, 2011
- Luka Gregorc, 2012
- Sam Groth, 2013
- Nathan Healey, 2011
- Jordan Kerr, 2012
- Madison Keys, 2009
- Noppawan Lertcheewakarn, 2010
- Courtney Nagle, 2010
- Martina Navratilova, 2003
- Daniel Nestor, 2007
- Frédéric Niemeyer, 2007
- Eric Nunez, 2009
- Melanie Oudin, 2011
- Jessica Pegula, 2013
- Mark Philippoussis, 2012
- Karolína Plíšková, 2012
- Kristýna Plíšková, 2012
- Patrick Rafter, 2004
- Lisa Raymond, 2007
- Andy Roddick, 2010
- Chanda Rubin, 2006
- Sloane Stephens, 2013
- Fred Stolle, 1974
- Rennae Stubbs, 2006
- Venus Williams, 2009

== See also ==
- World TeamTennis
- Sports in Philadelphia
- Philadelphia Freedoms (1974)
