= Finneran Pavilion =

Multi-purpose arena in Villanova, Pennsylvania

William B. Finneran Pavilion
- The Finn
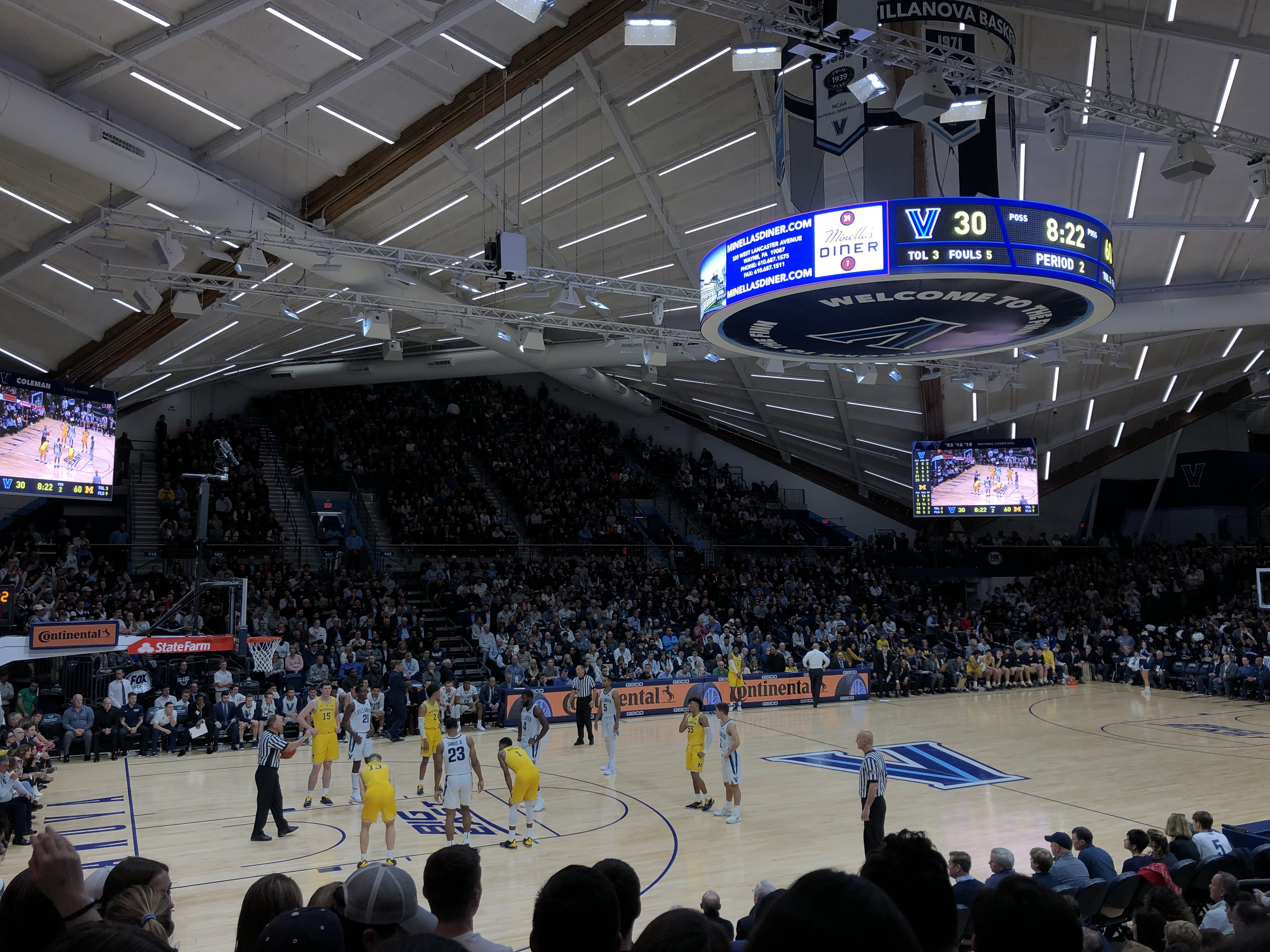
- The Finneran Pavilion during a basketball game in November 2018
- Interactive map of William B. Finneran Pavilion
- Former names: John Eleuthère du Pont Pavilion (1986–1997); The Pavilion (1997–2017)
- Location: Villanova University; Villanova, Pennsylvania 19085
- Coordinates: 40.034072°N 75.336553°W
- Owner: Villanova University
- Operator: Villanova University
- Capacity: 6,501 (basketball); 5,500 (concerts); 3,500 (tennis)
- Surface: Maple
- Public transit: SEPTA Metro: (Stadium); SEPTA bus: 105

Construction
- Groundbreaking: 1985
- Opened: February 1, 1986; October 5, 2018
- Renovated: 2017–2018
- Closed: February 25, 2017 (Original Pavilion)
- Cost: $24.9 million ($73.1 million in 2025 dollars)
- Architect: Tully International Inc. EwingCole (Renovation)

Tenants
- Villanova Wildcats (NCAA) (1986–1995, 1998–2017, 2018–present); Philadelphia Freedoms (WTT) (2010–2016)

The William B. Finneran Pavilion is a 6,501-seat multi-purpose arena in Villanova, Pennsylvania, United States, about 10 miles northwest of downtown (Center City) Philadelphia.

Built in 1985, the arena is home to the Villanova University Wildcats basketball teams. It is recognizable from the outside for its hyperbolic paraboloid roofline, similar to Alfond Arena at the University of Maine. It replaced the still-existing Villanova Field House, later renamed the "Jake Nevin Field House," a small arena-auditorium built in 1932.

The first men's basketball game played at the Pavilion took place on February 1, 1986, a 64–62 victory against the University of Maryland.

For basketball games where larger crowds are expected, Villanova plays at Xfinity Mobile Arena in Philadelphia (where Villanova holds the record for largest Pennsylvania crowd to watch a college basketball game, att. 20,859). The Finneran Pavilion is known for its famed student section, which constitutes a full third of the seating. Formerly located in the south end, the student bleachers seat 2,000 students but have been known to be filled with as many as 2,500 students.

Until 2016, it was the home court of the Philadelphia Freedoms of World TeamTennis.

23,016 square feet (2,138.3 m^{2}) of arena floor space is utilized for concerts, conventions, trade shows, graduation ceremonies and other special events. There are two meeting rooms.

== History ==
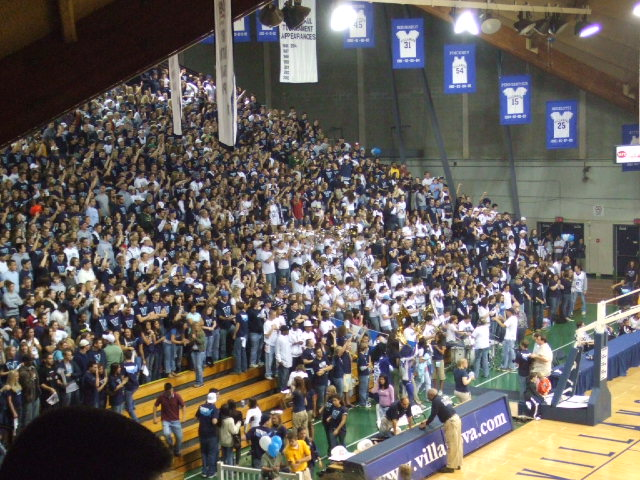
The Pavilion student section

The facility was originally known as John Eleuthère du Pont Pavilion, as it was funded in part by John Eleuthère du Pont, a member of the wealthy and influential Du Pont family. In 1997, the du Pont name was removed from the facility, with the family's tacit permission, after John was convicted of the murder of Olympic wrestling gold medalist Dave Schultz. From 1997 to 2017, it was simply The Pavilion before its current name was adopted as 1963 graduate William B. Finneran made a $22.6 million donation to the school in April 2016 to help with its current improvements.

=== Renovation ===
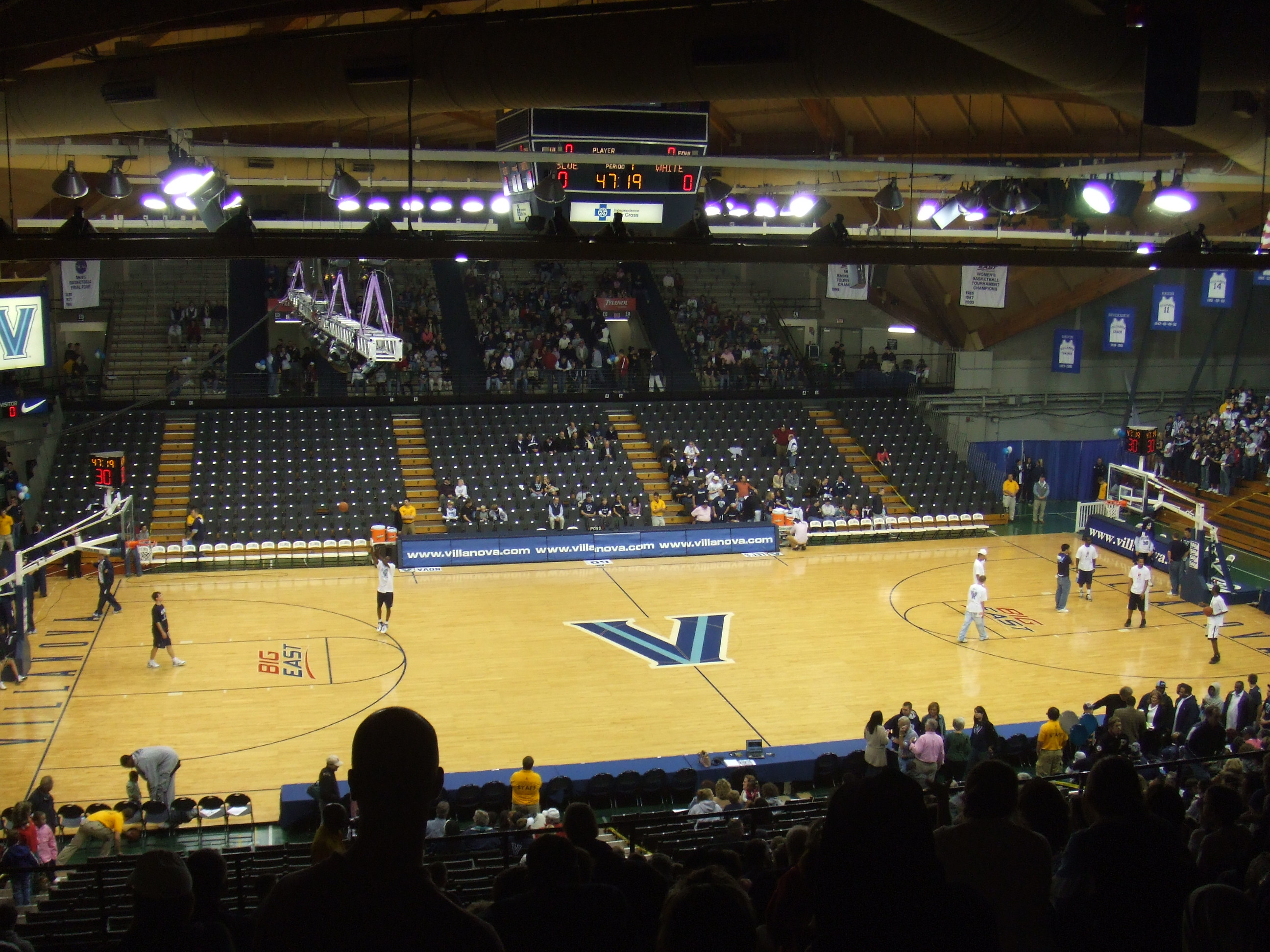
The Pavilion in 2006 pre-renovation

In 2016 it was announced the Pavilion would undergo a $65 million renovation to improve the aging facility. At the end of the 2016–17 academic year, the facility closed to begin on the renovations. During the renovations, Villanova's men's team played the 2017–18 season at the Wells Fargo Center, while the women's team used Jake Nevin Field House. The renamed William B. Finneran Pavilion reopened in October 2018 with new concession stands, "enhanced audio-visual capabilities", new seating, along with a new entrance. The renovation also included the Court One Club which features the court from the 2016 National Championship Game. Another part of the renovation included reducing the student section on the south end and adding student seating to the baseline of the north end. The first game played in the renovated Finneran Pavilion was a 100–77 victory over Morgan State.

== Events ==
The Finneran Pavilion is the current home to the Villanova Men's and Women's Basketball Teams. The arena also hosted other Villanova events including the yearly "Hoops Mania" event in Fall. Hoops Mania is the kickoff event to the Villanova Men's Basketball season and has had past performers such as Drake, Nicki Minaj and Wiz Khalifa. The Pavilion was the home court of the Philadelphia Freedoms of World TeamTennis from 2010 to 2016.

== See also ==
- List of NCAA Division I basketball arenas
