= Moxi =

Moxi may refer to:

- Moxi (DVR), digital video recorders
- Mo Xi, consort of Jie, the last ruler of the legendary Xia dynasty
- Moxi, Luding County, Sichuan, China
- MOXI, The Wolf Museum of Exploration + Innovation a science and children's museum in Santa Barbara, California

== See also ==
- Moxie (disambiguation)
- Moxy (disambiguation)
