= XLB =

XLB may refer to:

- Lac Brochet Airport (IATA code)
- Xiaolongbao
- XLB (Portland, Oregon), pair of Chinese restaurants in Portland, Oregon
