= Shawnee Mall =

- Location: Shawnee, Oklahoma, United States
- Coordinates: 35.386°N 96.928°W
- Opened: March 1989
- Developer: Herring Marathon
- Owner: Urban Retail Properties, LLC
- Num. of stores: 51
- Floor area: 455,420 sq ft (42,310 m^{2})
- Floors: 1
- Parking: 3,039 spaces
- Website: shopshawneemall.com

The Shawnee Mall is a regional shopping mall and trade area located in Shawnee, Oklahoma. It contains approximately 455,420 square feet of gross leasable area.

Herring Marathon and JCPenney built the mall. It opened in March 1989, with JCPenney, Sears, Walmart, and Dillard's as the anchor stores. A new Walmart Supercenter opened outside the mall on August 25, 2004, and the previous mall location was closed and blocked off. In 2013, Jo-Ann's opened in the former Old Navy. The relocation of the Sears store was announced in January 2014. That space is now occupied by Dunham's Sports. After relocating to an empty spot, the Sears was occupied by Habitat for Humanity in 2023 after Sears was closed. The closure of the JCPenney store was announced on June 4, 2020. The space is now an Ashley HomeStore. Jo-Ann Stores closed in 2025 when the chain liquidated all its locations.
