= Moxy =

Moxy may refer to:

- Moxy (airline), formerly proposed name and callsign for the airline Breeze Airways in the United States
- Moxy (band), a Canadian hard rock band formed in the 1970s
  - Moxy (album), 1975
  - Moxy II, 1976
- Moxy Engineering, a Norwegian dump truck manufacturer
- The Moxy Show, Cartoon Network's first original series
- Moxy Hotels, a hotel brand owned by Marriott International
  - Moxy Portland Downtown, a hotel in Portland, Oregon, U.S.
- Moxy, a nickname for the research chemical 5-MeO-MiPT
- Moxy, performer of theme music for Cartoon Network original series Ben 10
- MOXy, the EclipseLink implementation of Jakarta XML Binding
- Moxy, a character from Mack & Moxy
- Moxy, a character in the 2019 film UglyDolls

== See also ==
- Moxie (disambiguation)
- Moxey (disambiguation)
