= David Lichtenstein =

Chairman & CEO of The Lightstone Group

- Born: Brooklyn, New York
- Occupation: CEO
- Years active: 1988–
- Organization: Lightstone
- Known for: Real Estate
- Board member of: Board of Governors of the Real Estate Board of New York (REBNY), Member of The Economic Club of New York (ECNY) and the Real Estate Roundtable (RER), Trustee of The Touro College and University System, and Board Member of the Supervisory Committee for The New York Medical College

David Lichtenstein is an American multi-billionaire, entrepreneur, and real estate investor. He is the founder and CEO of The Lightstone Group, which he founded in 1988.

During the early years of the Lightstone Group, Lichtenstein focused on investing in multifamily properties. He rapidly grew his portfolio in the 1990s, before diversifying his portfolio and moving into retail. In 2003, Lichtenstein acquired Prime Retail for $638 million. Since 2007, Lichtenstein has been responsible for some of the largest acquisitions and sales in the retail and hospitality sectors. In 2007, The Lightstone Group acquired Extended Stay Hotels for $8.1 billion. Lightstone sold Prime Retail in 2010 for $2.3 billion, earning a large profit from the sale of the outlet mall group.

Lichtenstein serves on the Board of Governors of the Real Estate Board of New York, and is a Member of both The Economic Club of New York and the Real Estate Roundtable. He is a Trustee of the Touro College and University System and sits on the Board Supervisory Committee for the New York Medical College.

Lichtenstein previously served on the NYC Economic Development Corporation’s Board of Directors, appointed by New York City Mayor Bill de Blasio. He was also Co-Chair of the Real Estate Roundtable’s Real Estate Capital Policy Advisory Committee and a Trustee of the Citizens Budget Commission. He was formerly a member of the Brookings Institution’s Economic Studies Council.

== Early life ==
Lichtenstein was born in a Jewish family in New York City. His parents taught in public schools in Brooklyn. Lichtenstein grew up in the working-class neighborhood of Sheepshead Bay, Brooklyn and graduated from James Madison High School (Brooklyn). He did not attend college.

== Career ==
=== Founding of Lightstone (1988–2003) ===
Lichtenstein developed an avid interest in property during his twenties and launched his real estate career. At the time, he was living in a two-family home in New Jersey. In 1986, Lichtenstein used $89,000 in credit card debt to buy a multi-family home in New Jersey. Over a three-year period, Lichtenstein reinvested capital from his properties to fund the down payments on more properties. He then leveraged the new properties with loans, allowing him to continue to add to his portfolio.

Following the success of his small real estate business, Lichtenstein founded The Lightstone Group in 1988. He is the CEO of the company. The company was founded in Lakewood, New Jersey, and grew quickly during the early years of the company's history. During the first few years of Lightstone's activity, Lichtenstein focused on acquiring multifamily properties in the New Jersey area.

In the 1990s, Lichtenstein grew The Lightstone Group's portfolio to over 20,000 apartments in 28 states. The company was recognized as one of the top 30 apartment owners across the United States around the same time. From 1997 onwards, there was a housing price boom in the United States, which lasted for nearly a decade. The boom was good for the existing portfolio Lichtenstein had amassed, but it made it more difficult to find affordable properties to purchase.

The housing bubble that began in 1997 led Lichtenstein to look elsewhere at other real estate opportunities, which included property outside the United States for the first time. In 2000, Lightstone began to invest in retail strips, and subsequently into investing in malls. His first major purchase in retail came in 2002, when he acquired a Prime Retail-run mall for $36.5 million. The outlet mall was based in Puerto Rico and was one of many Prime Retail developments that required redevelopment at the time of purchase. Lichtenstein stated in an interview that outlet malls at the time had become an "out-of-favor stock in an out-of-favor industry".

After seeing the potential of the single mall in Puerto Rico, Lichtenstein made his first major deal in the real estate market in 2003. He purchased the entire Prime Retail portfolio for $638 million. The portfolio consisted of 37 properties spread across a number of states in the US, in locations such as Pleasant Prairie, Wis., Odessa, Mo, and Gaffney, S.C. The acquisition made Lightstone the second-largest owner of outlet malls in the country after Chelsea Premium Outlets, owned by Simon Property Group Inc., the nation's largest mall owner.

=== REIT and further investments (2004–2010) ===
Lichtenstein announced in 2006 that he would be launching a real estate investing trust (REIT), which allowed Lightstone to raise capital from outside investors. The REIT, named Lightstone Value Plus, had a fund value of $300 million and aimed to invest in a mix of office, retail and other commercial properties. According to The New York Times, many developers at the time were focusing on "trophy buildings" in major the US cities. His strategy differed from that of many major investors at the time, as he stated, "do you want to go to a fishing hole where there's a lot of other people fishing, or do you want to be where you're the only guy with a hook in the water? We would concentrate on any place where the big boys aren't."

During the same year, Lichtenstein returned to investing in housing with a number of large investments in affordable housing. He purchased 5,000 units across 19 multifamily rental properties in Detroit. It was reported that the entire deal was for a total of $200 million. His second housing deal of the year was in Birmingham, Alabama, where he spent a total of $303 million on a number of apartment buildings. While expanding the diversity of investments, he also moved into hospitality in 2007 with his biggest single deal to date. Lightstone acquired Extended Stay Hotels for a total of $8.1 billion, making Lightstone the parent company of one of the largest mid-priced hotel brands in the United States. At the time, it was said the hotel group had 683 hotels across 44 US states and Canada. Extended Stay later sought bankruptcy protection due to the Great Recession.

Lichtenstein sold Prime Retail in 2010 to Simon Property Group, who were already the biggest outlet mall owners in the United States. The $2.3 billion deal freed up cash for further investments.

=== Recent investments (2011–present) ===
Lichtenstein's Lightstone Value Plus was one of a number of REITs attracting attention from investors, due to market instability. In late 2010, REITs raised an estimated $9 billion, with a 6.5 percent annual yield. Lightstone Value Plus was the 18th-largest non-traded United States-based REIT, with a dividend of seven percent. That percentage was much higher than many other non-traded REITs during that period. Following the success of Lightstone Value Plus, Lichtenstein launched a second non-traded REIT. Lightstone Value Plus II followed a similar strategy to the initial fund, focusing on investments across a number of markets.

The sale of Prime Retail and both REITs gave Lichtenstein a large fund to invest throughout 2011. According to reports, there was an estimated $350 million remaining from the Prime Retail sale, which was reinvested into new deals. In 2011, Lichtenstein purchased Festival Bay Mall in Florida for $25 million, Crown Plaza Boston North Shore hotel for $10 million and a residential development in Long Island City, New York, for $19.3 million.

Lichtenstein and Lightstone Group announced the launch of Phoenix Development Partners, which aimed to develop large-scale renting opportunities in New York City. Despite shifting his focus to New York City-based investments, Lichtenstein continued to grow his portfolio in other locations across the United States. In September 2012, Lightstone Group announced they would be purchasing a $51 million residential development in Long Island City.

In 2013, Lichtenstein and Marriott completed their first deal, the purchase of three Marriott-branded hotels in Iowa and Ohio for $21 million. Later that year, Lichtenstein traveled to Israel to discuss entering the Israeli debt market. Loans from Israel were used to underwrite a number of developments in Brooklyn's Gowanus Canal area.

Following Amazon's decision to abandon its plans to build a headquarters in Queens, Lichtenstein called it the "worst day for NYC since 9-11," adding that "this time, the terrorists were elected."

== Investments ==
Lightstone has averaged more than 30% annual returns over much of its existence.

Lichtenstein has publicly stated that he made risky investments in the past. He even shared some of his business tactics by saying that it is clever to buy land, instead of the homes that are built on it. Lichtenstein has publicly shared his views on risks and predictions regarding commercial real estate on CNBC and Bloomberg News.

== Civic and charitable endeavors ==
Then-New York City Mayor Bill de Blasio appointed Lichtenstein to the NYC Economic Development Corporation’s Board of Directors in 2015. Lichtenstein also serves on the Board of Governors of the Real Estate Board of New York.

In September 2005, Lightstone Group donated 50 Memphis apartments to help Hurricane Katrina victims in need of housing following the storm, offering the apartments rent-free for six months. "We are fortunate to have the ability to house families affected by this traumatic event and can only hope that in some small way, those affected by this tragedy will be able to take some comfort in receiving this temporary shelter," Lichtenstein said. Lichtenstein himself matched contributions to relief efforts dollar-for-dollar from all employees in The Lightstone Group's family of companies.

Following Hurricane Sandy in November 2012, The Lightstone Group donated more than 11,000 square feet of office space at 1407 Broadway to assist businesses affected by the storm. More than 17 million square feet of office space in lower Manhattan had been shuttered in Sandy's aftermath. The donation – in collaboration with the city Economic Development Corporation – allowed the businesses to remain in the Manhattan offices for as long as six months.

== Books and radio show ==
Lichtenstein is the author of three books on the Orthodox Jewish perspective on current events and contemporary topics including terrorism, gay marriage, abortion, missionary activities, insanity, genetics, and vaccinations. He has also authored a commentary on the Mishna Berurah that presents the positions of many contemporary halachic authorities in relation to the text. Lichtenstein also has a weekly radio show which covers the Jewish perspective on a different controversial topic each week. The show is well known for including interviews with various prominent Rabbis and Jewish community leaders. The lineup of personalities interviewed includes both Haredi and Modern Orthodox leaders.

== Personal life ==
As a Haredi Jew, Lichtenstein spent a number of years studying in yeshiva and kollel. He is a student of the Mirrer Yeshiva in Brooklyn and Yerushalayim. He is also a student of Rabbi Nochum Partzovitz and Rabbi Shlomo Zalman Auerbach.
