= List of presidential trips made by Barack Obama (2012) =

This is a list of presidential trips made by Barack Obama during 2012, the fourth year of his presidency as the 44th president of the United States.

This list excludes trips made within Washington, D.C., the US federal capital in which the White House, the official residence and principal workplace of the president, is located. Additionally excluded are trips to Camp David, the country residence of the president, and to the private home of the Obama family in Kenwood, Chicago. It also excludes trips made as part of his re-election campaign.

== January ==
Country/ U.S. state	Areas visited	Dates	Details	Image
Ohio	Shaker Heights	January 4	President Obama traveled to Shaker Heights, Ohio, near Cleveland, to meet with Richard Cordray, the newly appointed Director of the Consumer Financial Protection Bureau, and the Eason family, a family affected by consumer fraud, at their residence. He later delivered remarks at Shaker Heights High School on the assurance of consumer protection.	
Illinois	Chicago	January 11	President Obama traveled to his hometown of Chicago to raise nearly $2 million for his reelection campaign. He also made a surprise visit to his campaign headquarters located in Two Prudential Plaza.	
Florida	Disney World	January 19	President Obama delivered a speech at Magic Kingdom about Travel and Tourism.	
Iowa	Cedar Rapids	January 25	President Obama traveled to Cedar Rapids, Iowa after delivering the State of the Union Speech and toured the Conveyor Engineering & Manufacturing facility before delivering a speech on jobs stimulus.	
Arizona	Chandler	January 25	President Obama traveled to Chandler, Arizona and visited an Intel plant.	
Nevada	Las Vegas	January 25–26	President Obama arrived at McCarran International Airport and spent the night at the Element Hotel in Summerlin before visiting a UPS facility in Paradise the next day.	
Colorado	Aurora	January 26	President Obama visited Buckley Air Force Base in Aurora to deliver a speech on clean energy.	
Michigan	Ann Arbor	January 27	President Obama visited the University of Michigan in Ann Arbor delivering a speech on the rising costs of education.	

== February ==
Country/ U.S. state	Areas visited	Dates	Details	Image
Wisconsin	Milwaukee	February 15	President Obama toured and delivered remarks at the Master Lock manufacturing facility.	
Washington	Everett	February 17	President Obama toured and delivered remarks at the Boeing Everett Factory.	
Florida	Miami, Windermere	February 24	Obama gave a speech on the economy at the University of Miami. He later attended a fundraiser for his reelection campaign at the Windermere home of Vince Carter of the Dallas Mavericks, with NBA Commissioner David Stern, Los Angeles Clippers star Chris Paul and Mavericks owner Mark Cuban in attendance.	

== March ==
Country/ U.S. state	Areas visited	Dates	Details	Image
New Hampshire	Nashua	March 1	President Obama toured and delivered a speech at the Nashua Community College, regarding the reduction of oil importation into the United States.	
North Carolina	Mount Holly	March 7	President Obama delivered remarks at the Freightliner Trucks plant.	
Virginia	Prince George	March 9	President Obama delivered a speech at the Rolls-Royce Crosspointe plant, regarding the economy and public–private partnerships.	
Ohio	Dayton	March 13	During British Prime Minister David Cameron's visit to the United States, President Obama took Prime Minister Cameron to Dayton, Ohio to view the NCAA Men's Division I Basketball Tournament First Four at the University of Dayton Arena.	
Illinois	Chicago	March 16	President Obama attended a fundraiser for his reelection campaign in his hometown of Chicago while likely opponent Mitt Romney was only a few miles away in the suburb of Rosemont.	
Georgia (U.S. state)	Atlanta	March 16	President Obama attended a fundraiser for his reelection campaign at the home of actor Tyler Perry. About 40 guests, including Oprah Winfrey, attended at an estimated price of $35,800 a person.	
Nevada	Boulder City	March 21	President Obama arrived at McCarran International Airport before visiting the Copper Mountain Solar Facility in Boulder City.	
New Mexico	Maljamar, Roswell	March 21	President Obama visited the oil fields in Maljamar, as part of his tour to promote the increase of domestic energy.	
Oklahoma	Cushing, Oklahoma City	March 21–22	President Obama delivered remarks at the TransCanada Stillwater Pipe Yard, regarding domestic energy and the Keystone Pipeline.	
Ohio	Columbus	March 22	President Obama toured the Ohio State University Center for Automotive Research and delivered a speech regarding domestic energy.	
South Korea	Osan, Seoul	March 25–27	President Obama visited South Korea to take part in the Nuclear Security Summit, in Seoul. After landing at Osan Air Base, south of Seoul, Mr. Obama traveled to the Korean Demilitarized Zone between North and South Korea, where he greeted some of the 28,500 American troops stationed in South Korea. He visited Observation Post Ouellette, a hilltop border post ringed with sandbags, overlooking the heavily fortified, brown hills of the North Korean countryside. After returning from the Korean Demilitarized Zone, Obama hold a bilateral meeting with Prime Minister Erdogan of Turkey and attend a bilateral meeting with President Lee Myung-bak of the Republic of Korea at the Blue House. While attending the Nuclear Security Summit Obama hold bilateral meetings with President Medvedev of Russia, President Nursultan Nazarbayev of Kazakhstan, President Hu Jintao of China and Prime Minister Yousaf Raza Gillani of Pakistan. President Obama also delivered remarks at Hankuk University of Foreign Studies in Seoul in which he discussed his Prague agenda to stop the spread of nuclear weapons and seek the peace and security of a world without them, including his commitment to safe, clean nuclear energy as part of his comprehensive strategy to develop all sources of American energy.	
Vermont	Burlington, University of Vermont	March 30	President Obama arrived at Burlington International Airport at around 11:30 am on March 30 and attended two campaign fundraisers in Burlington, ending the longest presidential visit drought of any state in the country. He first attended a reception with a group of about 100 people at the Sheraton Hotel & Conference Center on the outskirts of town before speaking at a larger event of around 4800 people at the Patrick Gym/Gutterson Fieldhouse complex on the campus of the University of Vermont. Vermont Governor Peter Shumlin, and Vermont Senators Bernie Sanders, I-VT, and Patrick Leahy, D-VT, also spoke at the UVM event prior to the president. The event at UVM was the largest campaign event that Obama's reelection campaign had held to date in terms of attendance. For this trip (as well as the subsequent stop in Portland), a Boeing C-32 aircraft served as Air Force One, instead of the usual Boeing VC-25.	
Maine	Portland	March 30	The President gave a speech at Southern Maine Community College and attended a fundraiser for him at the Portland Museum of Art.	

== April ==
Country/ U.S. state	Areas visited	Dates	Details	Image
Florida	Tampa	April 13	President Obama delivered remarks at the Port of Tampa regarding trade relations with Latin America.	
Colombia	Cartagena	April 13–15	President Obama traveled on a state visit to Colombia to take part in the 6th Summit of the Americas at the Julio Cesar Turbay Ayala Convention Center in Cartagena, Colombia and strengthen ties with the Hispanic community in his own country. Before the background of more distance and independence by Latin American and Caribbean countries from the United States of America discussed topics expected were the pros and cons of drug legalization in the context of America's war on drugs as well as the U.S. sanctions on Cuba and Cuba's continued exclusion from the Summit of the Americas. Before Obama's arrival in Cartagena at Friday April 13, 2012 several Secret Service agents providing security for President Barack Obama in Colombia have been recalled following allegations of misconduct. After the summits conclusion President Obama had a bilateral program with President Santos of Colombia which included a meeting and a working lunch. The two leaders then hold a joint press conference in which they announced that the United States–Colombia Free Trade Agreement will take effect May 15, 2012. Obama then toured Cartagena's historic San Pedro Claver church with Colombian President Santos toured the Iglesia de San Pedro Claver and attended an event to hand over land titles to representatives of the Afro-Colombian community at the Plaza de San Pedro in Cartagena, Colombia on April 15, 2012, in which Shakira participated. The land restititution is an attempt by Colombia to recognize marginalized communities who were forced from their land by armed groups. In the late afternoon, the President returned to the United States, getting back to Washington late Sunday night. The outcome of the summit for President Obama and the United States has been covered by newsagencies and newspsapers. During his trip to Colombia Obama visited the Castillo San Felipe de Barajas, the largest colonial fort in Colombia.	
Ohio	Elyria	April 18	President Obama met with unemployed students in a round table discussion at the Lorain County Community College, before delivering remarks.	
North Carolina	Chapel Hill	April 24	President Obama delivered remarks on college affordability at the University of North Carolina at Chapel Hill's Carmichael Arena. At the university, the president also filmed his appearance on Late Night with Jimmy Fallon.	
Colorado	Boulder, Colorado	April 24	President Obama spoke at the University of Colorado's Coors Event Center on student loan interest rates.	
Iowa	Cedar Rapids	April 25	President Obama participated in a round table discussion with students at the University of Iowa, before delivering remarks.	
Georgia (U.S. state)	Hinesville	April 27	President Obama and First Lady Michelle Obama met with troops at the 3rd Infantry Division headquarters in Fort Stewart.	

== May ==
Country/ U.S. state	Areas visited	Date(s)	Details	Image
Afghanistan	Bagram, Kabul	May 1–2	President Obama visited Afghanistan during an unannounced surprise night visit on the first anniversary of the death of Osama bin Laden to sign a strategic partnership agreement between Afghanistan and the United States of America, to spend time with U.S. troops stationed in Afghanistan and to address the American people from Bagram Air Base to lay out his plans for responsible ending the war in Afghanistan. The president landed at Bagram Air Base at 10.20 p.m. local time in Afghanistan, spent six hours in the country and had been flying out of Afghanistan at about 4:25 am. Afghanistan time. He flew from Bagram by helicopter to the Presidential Palace in Kabul to hold a bilateral meeting with President Hamid Karzai and delivered remarks before the signing of the strategic partnership agreement. After the signing he returned by helicopter to Bagram Air base. Here he spoke with U.S. troops, visited wounded soldiers at a hospital on Bagram Air Base, where he awarded 10 Purple Heart decorations, and spoke by radio to military personnel in other parts of the country who were involved in arranging his trip. President Obama then addressed his fellow American citizens from the air base and returned afterwards to the United States by use of Air Force One.	
Illinois	Chicago	May 19–21	President Obama attended the NATO summit meeting which was hosted by the United States. During the summit President Obama held a bilateral meeting with President Hamid Karzai of Afghanistan, met with NATO Secretary General Anders Fogh Rasmussen, took part in the official greeting of the North Atlantic Council Leaders and in a NATO family photo and attended several meetings at the summit including a brief one with Pakistani President Asif Ali Zardari.	
Virginia	Arlington	May 28	President Obama participated in Memorial Day ceremonies at Arlington National Cemetery, speaking at Memorial Amphitheater.	

== June ==
Country/ U.S. state	Areas visited	Date(s)	Details	Image
Mexico	Los Cabos	June 17–19	President Obama attended the G-20 summit meeting at the Fiesta Americana Grand Los Cabos Resort and the Los Cabos Convention Center in Los Cabos as well as Esperanza Resort in San Jose Del Cabo. During the summit Obama had a meeting with several European heads of state and government to discuss the European sovereign-debt crisis. Obama also hold bilateral meetings with Russian President Vladimir Putin, in which both presidents among other things discussed the Syrian civil war, Mexican President Felipe Calderon, German Chancellor Angela Merkel, Chinese President Hu Jintao and Turkish Prime Minister Recep Tayyip Erdogan.	

== July ==
Country/ U.S. state	Areas visited	Date(s)	Details	Image
Pennsylvania	Pittsburgh	July 6	President Obama hosts a rally at Carnegie Mellon University.	
Colorado	Aurora	July 22	President Obama met with the victims of the 2012 Aurora, Colorado shooting at the University of Colorado Hospital.	

== August ==
Country/ U.S. state	Areas visited	Date(s)	Details	Image
Colorado	Fort Collins	August 28	President Obama hosts a rally at Colorado State University.	
Virginia	Charlottesville	August 29	President Obama hosts a rally at University of Virginia.	
Texas	Fort Bliss	August 31		

== September ==
Country/ U.S. state	Areas visited	Dates	Details	Image
North Carolina	Charlotte	September 6	President Obama accepts the 2012 Democratic National Convention.	
Virginia	Arlington County	September 11	President Obama attended a memorial ceremony at the Pentagon Memorial in Arlington County, Virginia, where he spoke on the eleventh anniversary of the September 11 attacks.	

== October ==
Country/ U.S. state	Areas visited	Date(s)	Details	Image
Nevada	Henderson, Las Vegas	September 30 – October 3	President Obama rallies Las Vegas crowd and rehearsal for first Presidential Debate.	
Colorado	Denver	October 3	President Obama participated in the first presidential debate at University of Denver, along with Republican nominee Mitt Romney.	
New York	Hempstead	October 16	President Obama participated in the second presidential debate at Hofstra University, along with Republican nominee Mitt Romney.	
Florida	Boca Raton	October 22	President Obama participated in the third and final presidential debate at Lynn University, along with Republican nominee Mitt Romney.	
New Jersey	Atlantic City	October 31	President Obama toured the city's damage caused by Hurricane Sandy, along with Governor Chris Christie.	

== November ==
Country/ U.S. state	Areas visited	Date(s)	Details	Image
Illinois	Chicago	November 6	President Obama visited his hometown for the 2012 United States presidential election along with the immediate Obama family.	
Virginia	Arlington County	November 11	President Obama traveled to the Arlington National Cemetery on Veterans Day, laying a wreath on the Tomb of the Unknowns.	
New York	Staten Island	November 15	President Obama met with families affected by Hurricane Sandy and volunteers in the neighborhoods of Staten Island.	
Thailand	Bangkok	November 18–19	The President arrived at Don Mueang International Airport in Bangkok via Air Force One. In the afternoon he visited Wat Pho Royal Monastery with Secretary of State Hillary Clinton and received a Royal Audience with King Bhumibol Adulyadej at Siriraj Hospital. Obama then traveled to the Thai Koo Fah Building and took part in a formal welcome ceremony and signed a guest book at the Government House. Afterwards, the President met with Prime Minister Yingluck Shinawatra for a bilateral meeting to discuss Thai–U.S. cooperation and mark 180 years of official relations. In the evening, the President and Prime Minister held a joint press conference where Thailand announced it would join talks on deeper trade ties with the US and other countries under the Trans-Pacific Partnership. Later in the evening Obama attended an official dinner with Prime Minister Shinawatra and met and greeted with United States Embassy personnel at the Sports Complex of Chulalongkorn University. Obama spent the night in Bangkok and left Thailand the next morning.	
Burma	Yangon	November 19	After flying in from Bangkok, President Obama became the first U.S. president to visit the country, where he toured Shwedagon Pagoda with Secretary of State Hillary Clinton, met with President Thein Sein at Yangon Regional Parliament, met with MP Aung San Suu Kyi at her home to discuss Myanmar–U.S. relations in light of the country's democratic reforms, met briefly with representatives of civil society organizations, including an advocate for Burma's Rohingya population, met and greeted United States Embassy personnel at the Embassy, and delivered a speech on freedom, democracy, and the crucial role that respect for minorities’ rights plays in ensuring peace and prosperity at the University of Yangon. After his speech Obama departed Burma en route Phnom Penh, Cambodia.	
Cambodia	Phnom Penh	November 19–20	After flying in from Burma, Obama was welcomed by Cambodia's Prime Minister Hun Sen at the Peace Palace and then met with the Prime Minister. The President then attended the US-ASEAN leaders meeting at the Peace Palace. Obama later arrived at the Diamond Island Convention Center, where he attended the Seventh East Asia Summit Dinner. He remained overnight in Phnom Penh. The following day (November 20) Obama participated in the Trans-Pacific Partnership meeting, attended the Seventh East Asia Summit where he held bilateral meetings with Japanese Prime Minister Yoshihiko Noda and Chinese Premier Wen Jiabao and later met and greeted United States Embassy personnel. Obama left Phnom Penh on November 20, en route back to Washington. He became the first person holding the office to visit Cambodia.	

== December ==
Country/ U.S. state	Areas visited	Dates	Details	Image
Michigan	Redford	December 10	President Obama delivered remarks at the Detroit Diesel plant.	
Connecticut	Newtown	December 16	President Obama attended the interfaith vigil to commemorate the victims of the Sandy Hook Elementary School shooting at the Newtown High School, where he also delivered remarks and met with the families of the victims.	
Maryland	Bethesda	December 20	President Obama met with wounded troops and their families at the Walter Reed National Military Medical Center.	

== See also ==
- List of international presidential trips made by Barack Obama
- Lists of presidential trips made by Barack Obama
