= XLB (Portland, Oregon) =

Chinese restaurant in Portland, Oregon, U.S.

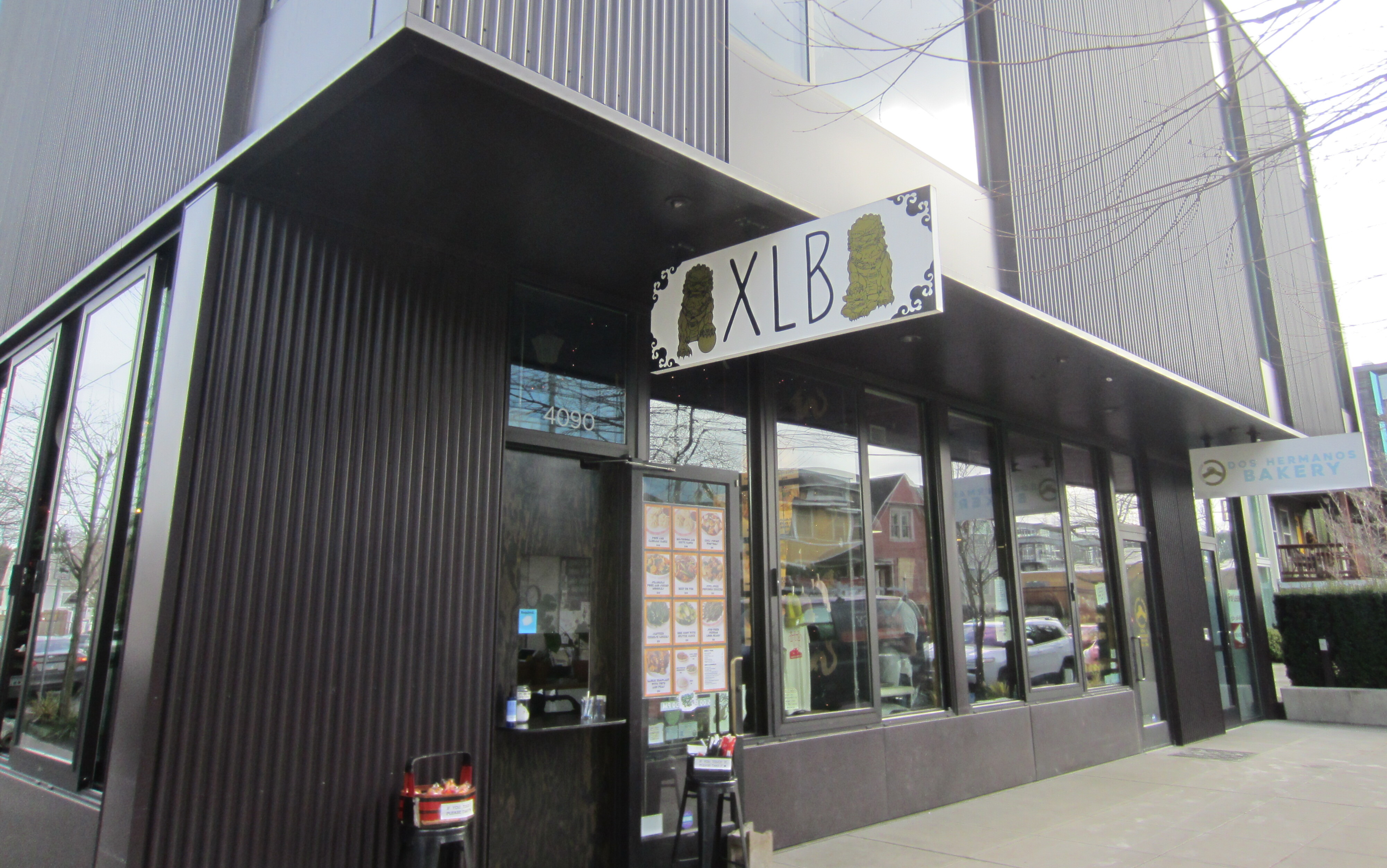
- Exterior of the original restaurant, 2021
- Interactive map of XLB

Restaurant information
- Established: January 2017
- Closed: April 20, 2025
- Owners: Jasper Shen; Linh Tran
- Food type: Chinese
- Location: 4090 North Williams Avenue, Portland, Multnomah, Oregon, 97227, United States
- Coordinates: 45.5532°N 122.6665°W
- Website: xlbpdx.com

XLB was a Chinese restaurant in Portland, Oregon, United States. Second-generation Chinese chef Jasper Shen opened the original restaurant along Williams Avenue in the north Portland part of the Boise neighborhood in January 2017. He and new business partner Linh Tran opened a second in northwest Portland's Slabtown district in 2019. The Slabtown location closed in 2021 and the original restaurant closed permanently in 2025.

XLB specialized in xiaolongbao and the limited menu also offered other soup dumplings, baozi, buns, noodles, and greens. The restaurant garnered a generally positive reception, with the soup dumplings receiving the most praise. XLB ranked second in the "Best Chinese Restaurant" category in Willamette Week's 2020 readers' poll.

== Description ==
The original restaurant seated up to 48 guests. The interior featured a portrait of Chinese martial arts film actor Gordon Liu painted by artist Michael Palaus. Designer Trish Grantham hung paper lanterns from the ceiling and had characters from the Chinese zodiac hand-painted across interior walls. Willamette Week's Matthew Korfhage said of the restaurant's interior in 2017: "XLB's open-kitchen, fast-casual space is a clean-lined hall of ironized Asiatic kitsch, complete with stylized kung fu paintings, Qing dynasty lights hung at varied heights and a gold-painted wallpaper pattern of Chinese zodiac silhouettes—perfect dog, perfect snake, perfect rooster." In 2020, Fodor's Inside Portland described the original XLB as a "bright, modern space with comfy booth and counter seating and colorful Chinese zodiac wallpaper". The original XLB offered patio seating during summer months.

The Slabtown location, which operated from 2019 to 2021, had a seating capacity of approximately 45 guests. A pedestrian walkway outside the restaurant allowed an additional 20 to 30 seats during summer months.

=== Menu ===
XLB's menu featured soup dumplings, baozi, buns, noodles, and greens. The restaurant specialized in xiaolongbao, or dumplings filled with pork and soup. Entrees included the "light-battered five-spice" popcorn chicken, once described as "sweetly clove and cinnamon heavy with a slight afterglow of numbing Sichuan pepper", and a Shahe fen noodle stir-fry with beef strips. Stir fries also had bok choy, green beans, and other seasonal vegetables such as Chinese greens from the Portland Farmers Market. The drink menu included beer, wine, and lychee-lime soda.

Korfhage described the menu, which started with approximately one dozen plates, as "culled from Shen's childhood memories eating around town and in his own family's restaurants". Early evening and late night happy hour specials were available in 2020.

== History ==
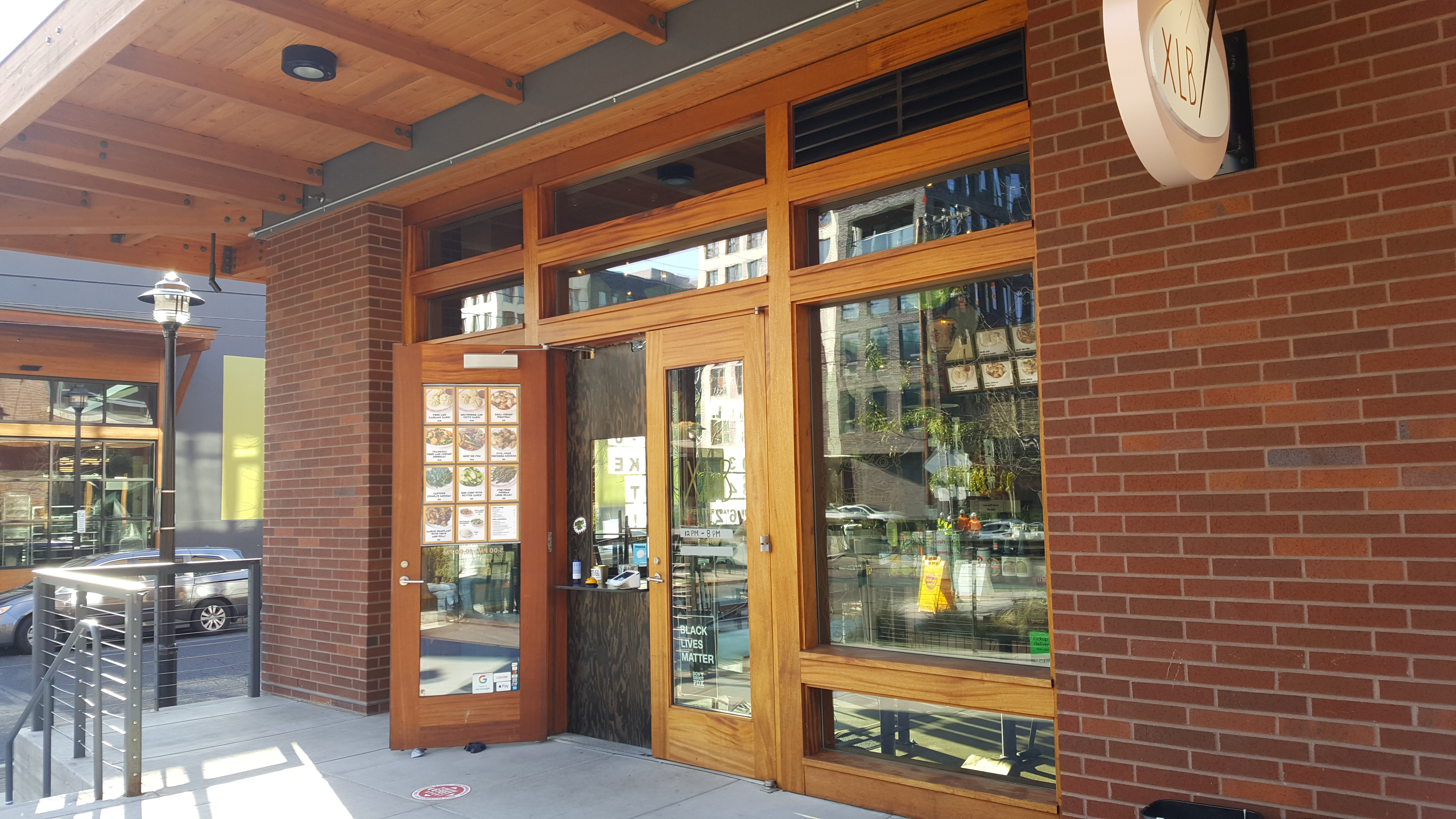
XLB's window operation in northwest Portland in 2020, during the COVID-19 pandemic. The Slabtown restaurant operated from 2019 to 2021.

Jasper Shen opened the original XLB along Williams Avenue in the north Portland part of the Boise neighborhood in January 2017. The second-generation Chinese chef had spent more than two years perfecting the craft of making xiaolongbao. As far back as 2014, he had considered opening a Chinese restaurant with Sarah Pliner and Kat Whitehead, with whom he had opened the Asian-French restaurant Aviary in northeast Portland in 2011. According to Korfhage, "Dumpling-crazed diners mobbed the former Aviary chef in droves, taxing his kitchen to the breaking point." Shen has acknowledged XLB "had a well-documented rough opening".

In April 2019, Shen and new business partner Linh Tran confirmed plans to open a second location in northwest Portland's Slabtown district. The 45-seat restaurant was housed in the Leland James building and offered a menu similar to the original. The Slabtown location closed in 2021. Shen and Tran offered the space to friend Diane Lam, who opened Sunshine Noodles.

XLB has participated in The Oregonian's annual Dumpling Week, which sees local restaurants showcase special dumpling recipes. During the COVID-19 pandemic, the restaurant operated via online delivery services.

In March 2025, XLB's owners announced plans to close permanently on April 20. The Filipino restaurant Sun Rice has announced plans to relocate from the Moxy Portland Downtown to XLB's former Boise location.

== Reception ==
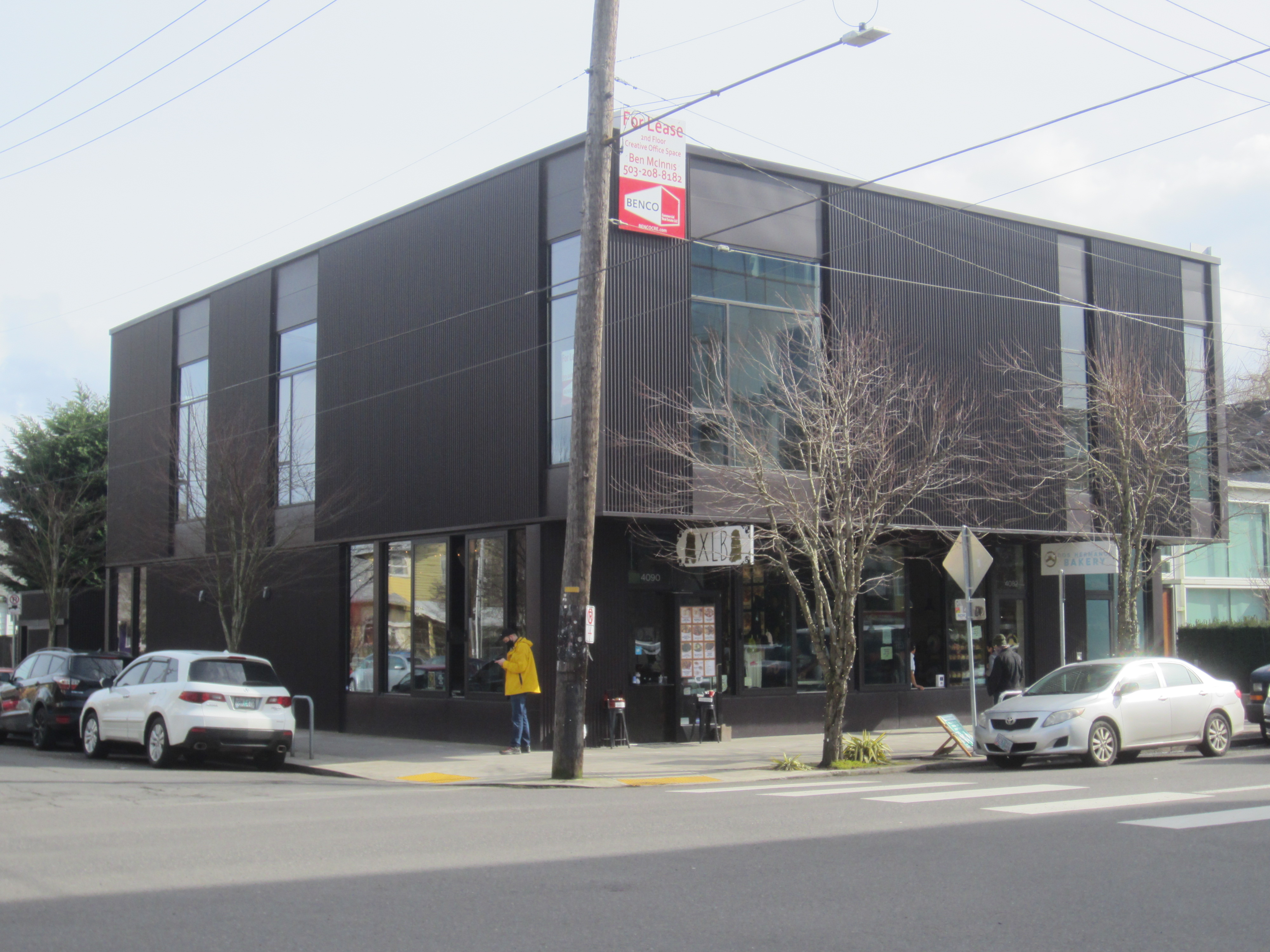
Exterior of the original restaurant on Williams Avenue in 2021

According to Eater Portland's Brooke Jackson-Glidden, the original restaurant "opened with massive crowds, quickly becoming the neighborhood spot for Chinese food." Andrea Damewood of the Portland Mercury wrote in late March 2017, "XLB received massive pre-opening press, and the line for counter service has often been out the door since day one in January". She said, "XLB's namesake menu item is... fine. It's one of the best you can score in town at this point... Even the freshest of these soup dumplings stray toward inexpertly thick at the top—Shen is not hand-twisting each of these, obviously, so there's hope his still-learning staff will get better after a couple thousand more turns. The amount of soup and filling is just fine, if lacking any major sort of flavor pop." Damewood found the bok choy too salty and the pork and shrimp noodles "thick and gummy", and said the popcorn chicken "had an oddly off-putting flavor and left a dry mouthfeel", ultimately recommending the garlic eggplant with tofu and peas.

In April 2017, Matthew Korfhage of Willamette Week complimented the popcorn chicken and opined: "The namesake dumplings are, by all accounts, inconsistent. An early visit found them too dry, a common complaint among people we've talked to. On a recent visit, they were terrific—bursting with lovely, savory, herbal, warming broth, accented with an on-point vinegar-shallot dipping sauce." In November, he updated his review, writing, "Early on, the namesake dumplings were inconsistent. We didn't give up, and have been rewarded... From slightly dim beginnings, XLB has turned the lights on: It's now a powerhouse." Furthermore, Korfhage said, "eight months in, XLB's soup dumplings are marvels of consistency: lovely, delicate kisses bursting with deep-flavored broth whose aroma blossoms out of the hole made by a curious fork." XLB ranked second in the "Best Chinese Restaurant" category in Willamette Week's 2020 readers' poll.

The Oregonian's Michael Russell included XLB's soup dumplings in his list of Portland's ten best dishes of 2017, writing, "At least until warring Seattle chains Din Tai Fung and Dough Zone decide to open a new theater to the south, XLB is the best place to find its namesake dumplings in Portland." He included XLB in his 2020 list of the city's 40 best inexpensive restaurants. Fodor's called the happy hour options "excellent" and the bao "especially tasty".

== See also ==
- History of Chinese Americans in Portland, Oregon
- List of casual dining restaurant chains
- List of Chinese restaurants
- List of defunct restaurants of the United States
- List of restaurant chains in the United States
