= The Streets at Southpoint =

Shopping mall in Durham, North Carolina, U.S.

Coordinates: 35°54′15.96″N 78°56′30.59″W

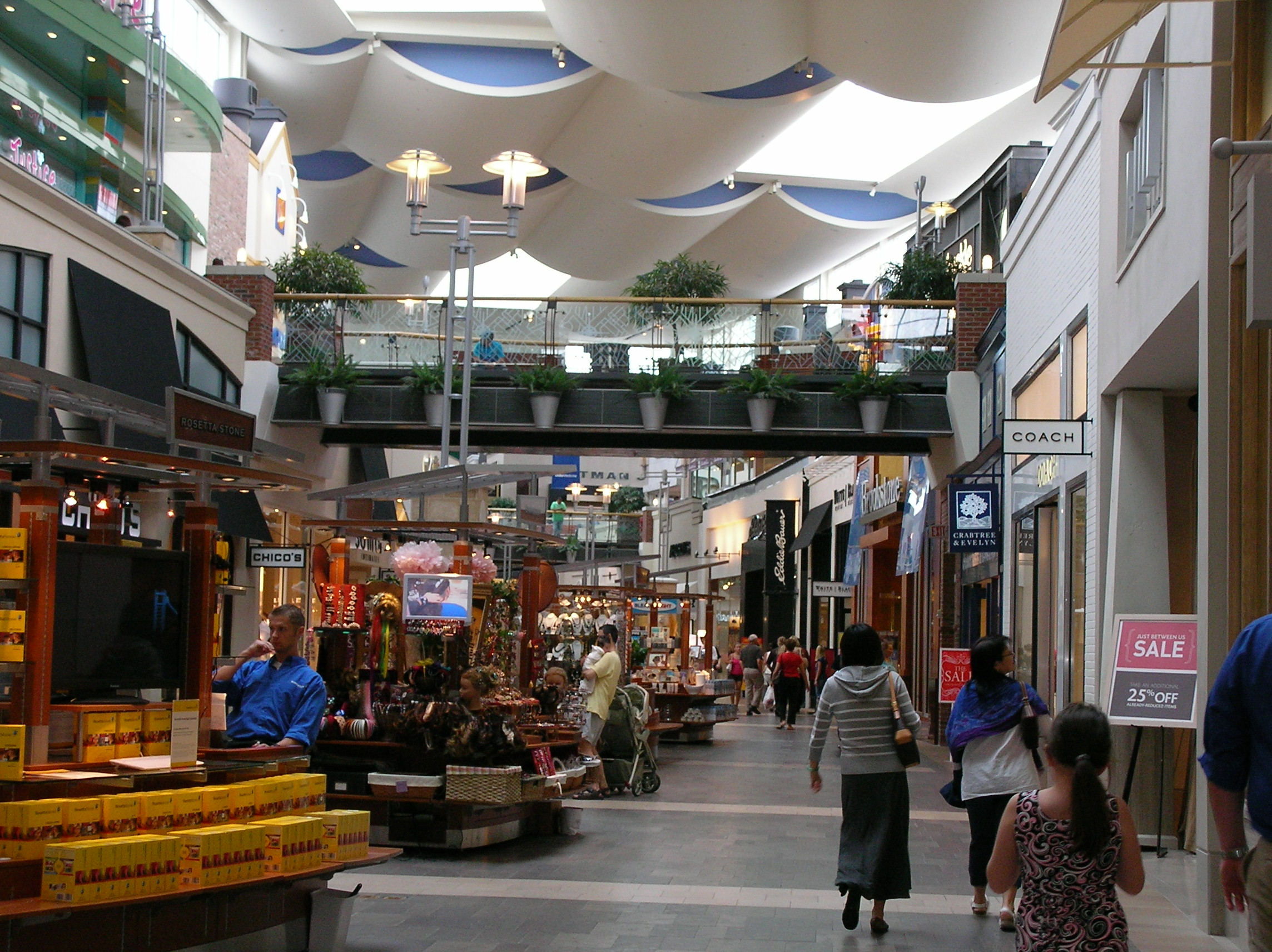
- Mall interior (2009)
- Location: Durham, North Carolina, U.S.
- Address: 6910 Fayetteville Road
- Opened: March 8, 2002; 24 years ago
- Developer: Urban Retail Properties (June 2000–January 2002); The Rouse Company (January 2002–March 2002)
- Manager: GGP
- Owner: GGP
- Architect: RTKL Associates
- Num. of stores: 150+
- Num. of anchor tenants: 5
- Floor area: 1,330,000 ft^{2} (124,000 m^{2})
- Floors: 2
- Parking: 6,400
- Website: streetsatsouthpoint.com

The Streets at Southpoint is a shopping mall in Durham, North Carolina. Located near I-40, on Fayetteville Road, the mall was developed by Urban Retail Properties (later The Rouse Co. following acquisition) and is currently owned and managed by GGP, a subsidiary of Brookfield Properties. The Streets at Southpoint opened in 2002. The mall features the traditional retailers Nordstrom, Macy's, Belk, and JCPenney, in addition to a 17-screen AMC Theatres and IMAX.

== History ==
The Streets at Southpoint took four years of planning and over two years of construction. The mall was designed by RTKL Associates, and groundbreaking began in June 2000.

In January 2002, The Rouse Company of Baltimore, in a joint venture with Simon Property Group and Westfield Group, announced that it would acquire and finish construction of The Streets at Southpoint as part of an acquisition of select Urban Retail's assets.

The Streets at Southpoint opened on March 8, 2002, with anchors Hecht's, Sears, JCPenney, Belk, and Nordstrom. The mall had around 300,000 visitors during its first three days of operation. The mall is home to many firsts for the area, including North Carolina's first Nordstrom and Apple Store. Other stores that were new to the Research Triangle area included Aveda, California Pizza Kitchen, Hollister Co., and Pottery Barn Kids. The Streets at Southpoint was the first mall to come to the Durham area in nearly three decades. The opening of the mall was chosen as the most important story of the year in Durham's Top 10 Business Stories of 2002.

On December 28, 2018, it was announced that the Sears anchor store would close. On February 1, 2019, it was announced that the previous Sears anchor store was being considered for redevelopment. On June 23, 2023, Brookfield, the mall development firm, won the approval for an enhanced development to occur outside the mall which is set to include an additional 100,000 square feet of retail space, 300,000 square feet of offices, up to 200 hotel rooms, and more than 1,382 apartments. Brookfield determined that it's appropriate to invest in the property as places like Fenton and Raleigh Iron Works come into the market.

Since the COVID-19 lockdowns, The Streets at Southpoint has announced several new additions, among them are Peloton, Warby Parker, Offline by Aerie, Evereve, LoveSac, and Lovisa, and a larger store format for Apple.

== Architecture ==
The Streets at Southpoint was designed and developed by Urban Retail Properties with an old-fashioned Main Street concept. RTKL Associates Inc. served as the architect and also provided environmental graphic design services, incorporating the logo design throughout the development, reinforcing the shopping center's identity. The mall is a "hybrid mall," combining a traditional enclosed mall with an outdoor pedestrian wing. A 70-feet glass wall separates the two portions of the mall.

The Streets at Southpoint's developer, Jim Farrell, wanted to add to the Main Street feel, envisaging playing children as a fixture of the mall. He enlisted A.R.T. Design Group to create statues of some of the children of local leaders. There are 23 statues in total throughout the mall, taking three years to create.

Over 2 million red bricks were used to line both the exterior and interior of the mall. Architects were inspired by downtown of Durham and the brick façades of the buildings at UNC and on Franklin Street. Hand rails throughout the mall include pieces of maps of Durham. The food court, entitled "Fork in the Road," was inspired by old tobacco warehouses.

A 70-foot smokestack can be found at the end of the outdoor stretch of the mall in an effort to pay homage to the heritage of downtown Durham. Mature trees and shrubbery were shipped in from other locations in order to make the mall seem as if it has been in Durham for a long time. The outdoor Main Street includes larger retailers and stand-alone restaurants such as The Cheesecake Factory.

== Reception ==
As of 2023, the mall had received on average over 1 million visitors every month since its opening.

== Gallery ==
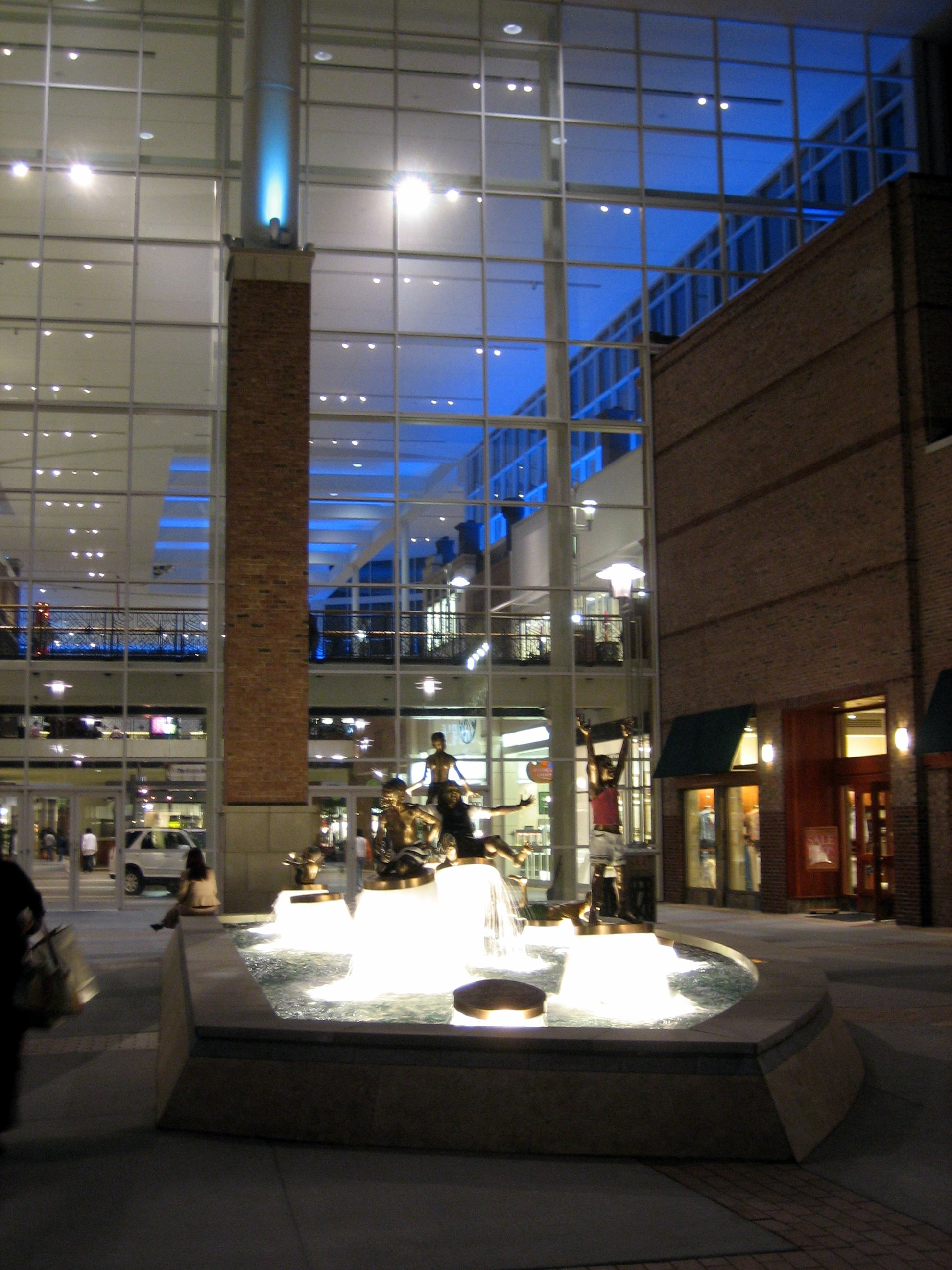
70 foot glass wall separating the indoor and outdoor portions

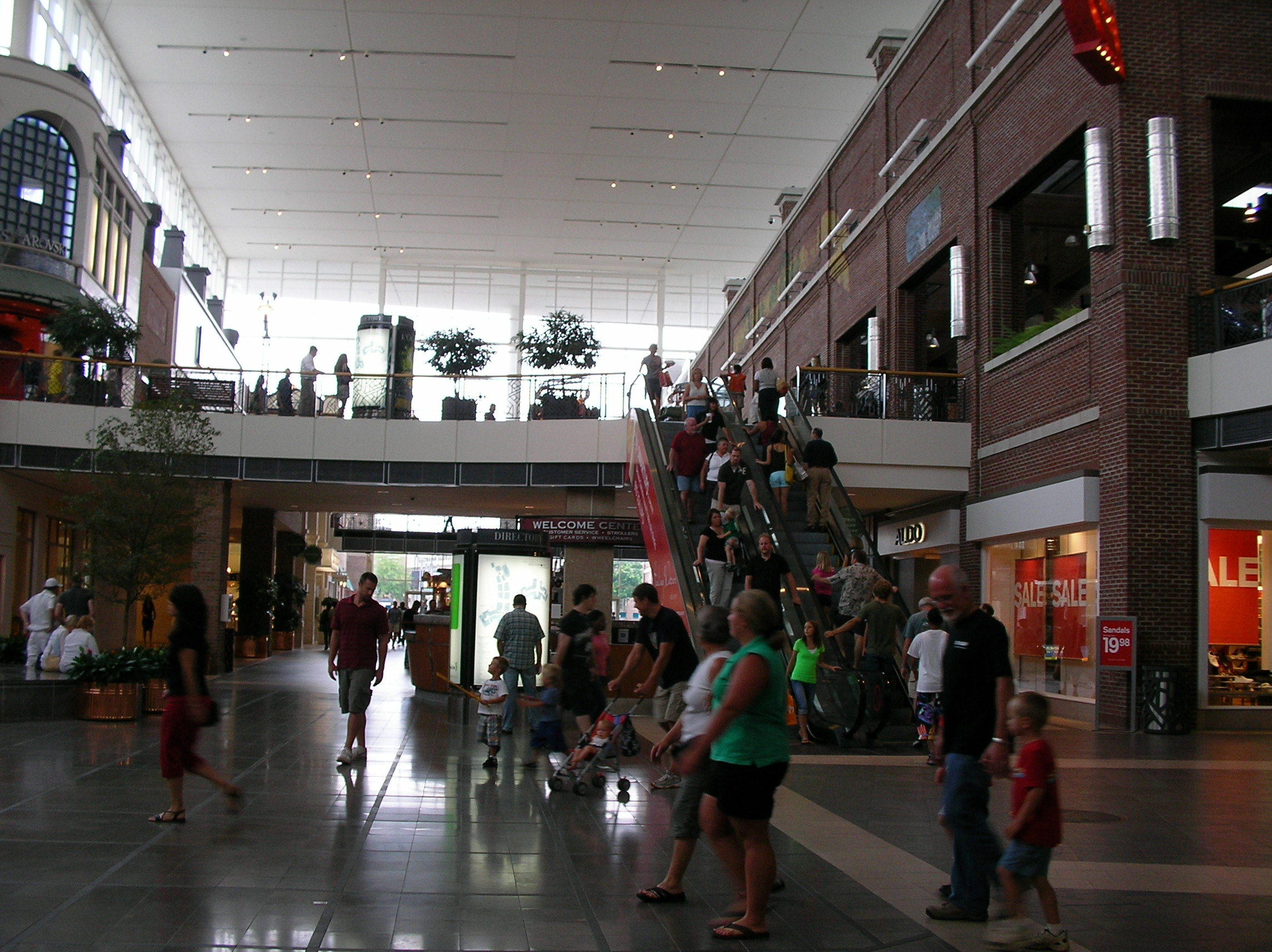
Main Street & Southpoint Street

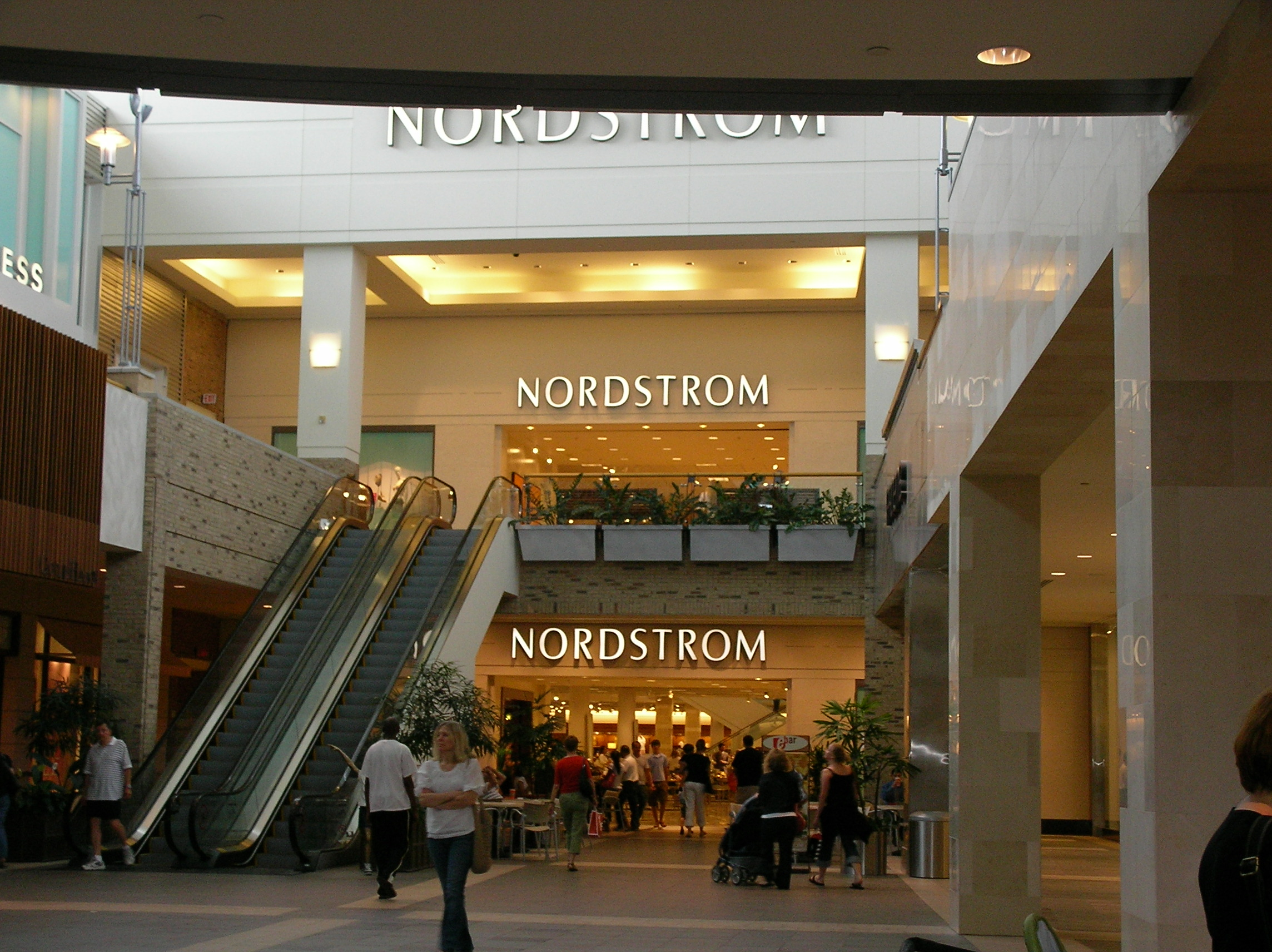
Nordstrom in the mall

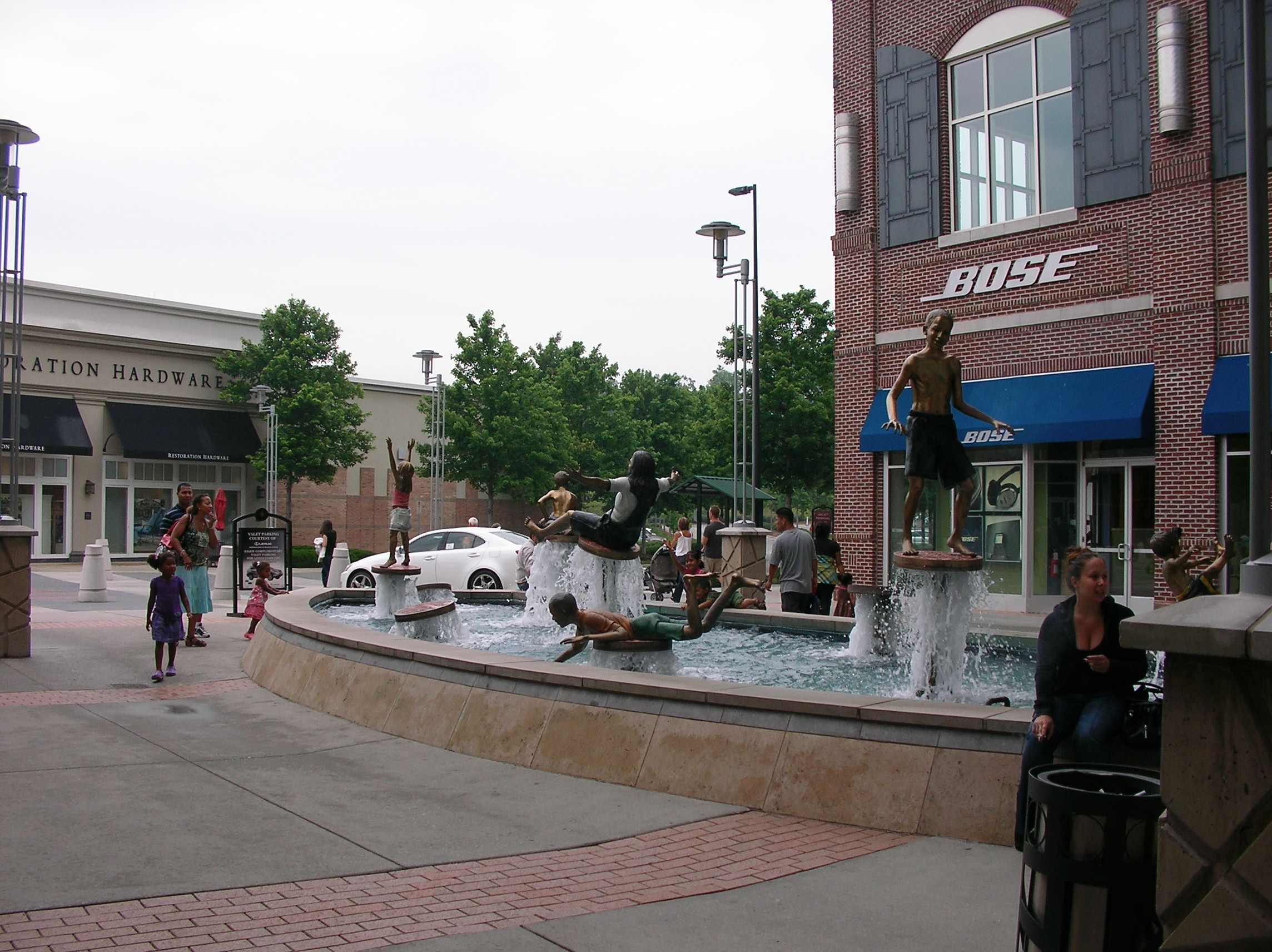
A water fountain at an entrance of the mall

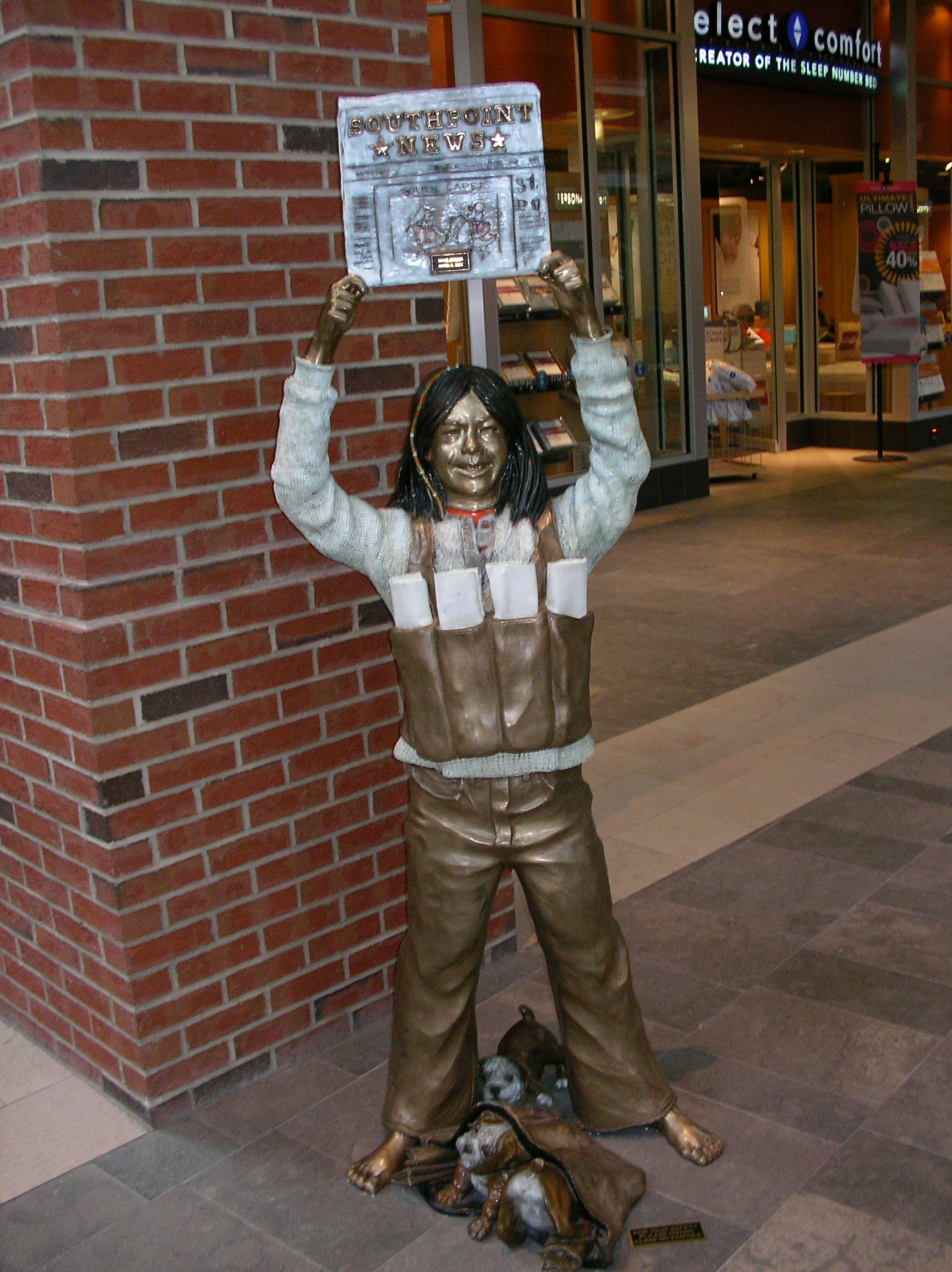
A statue in the mall

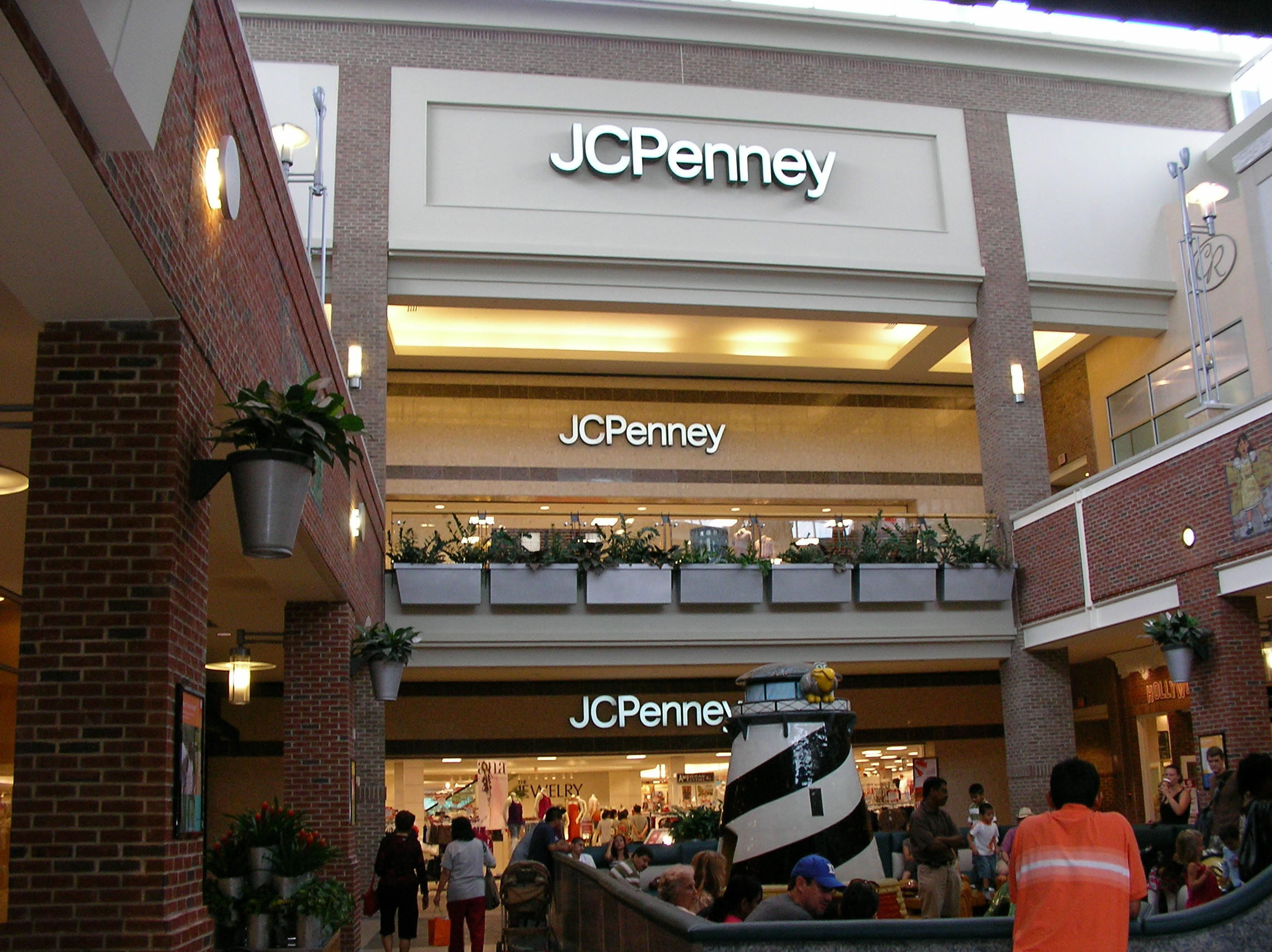
JCPenney in the mall

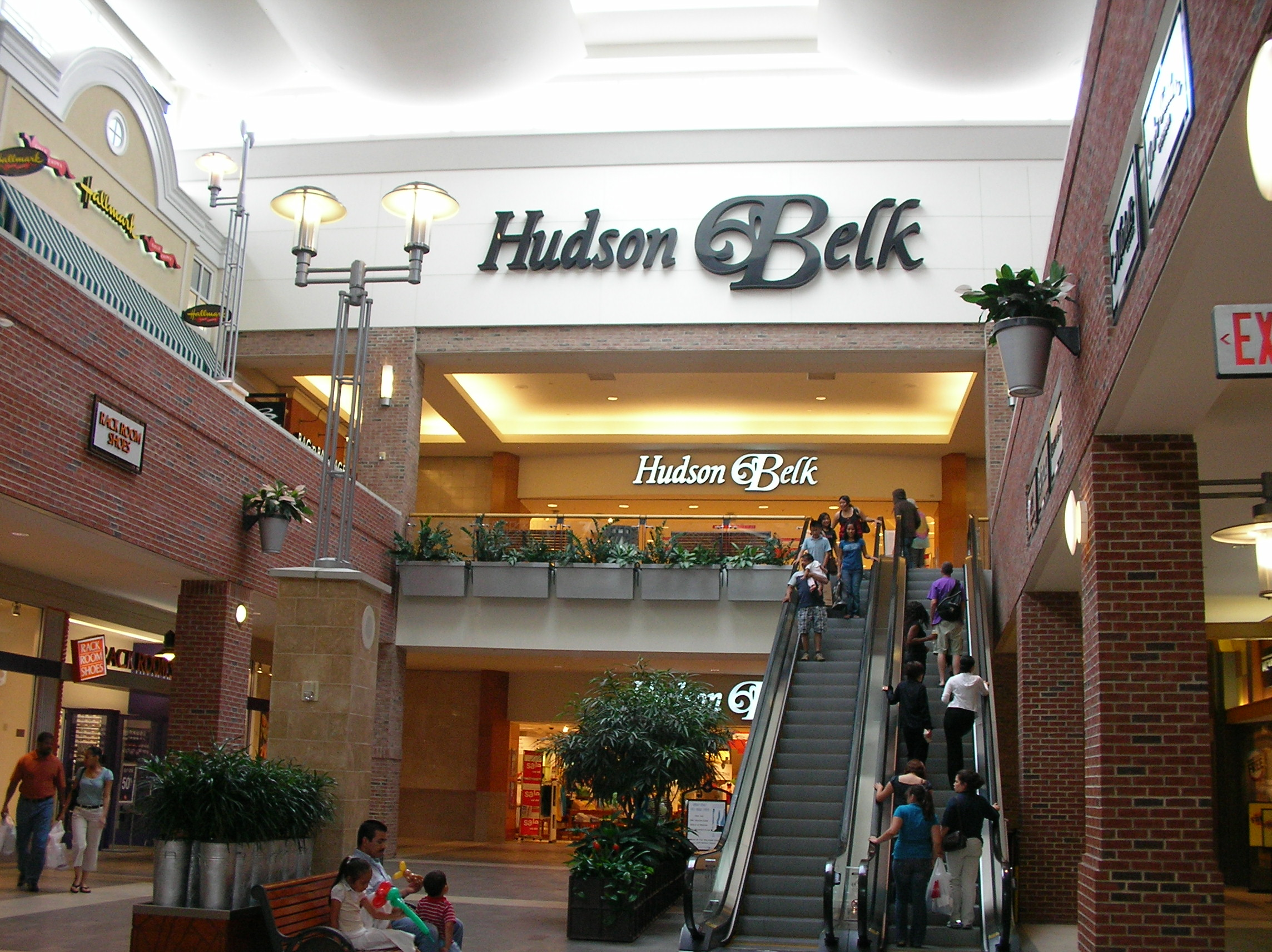
Belk in the mall

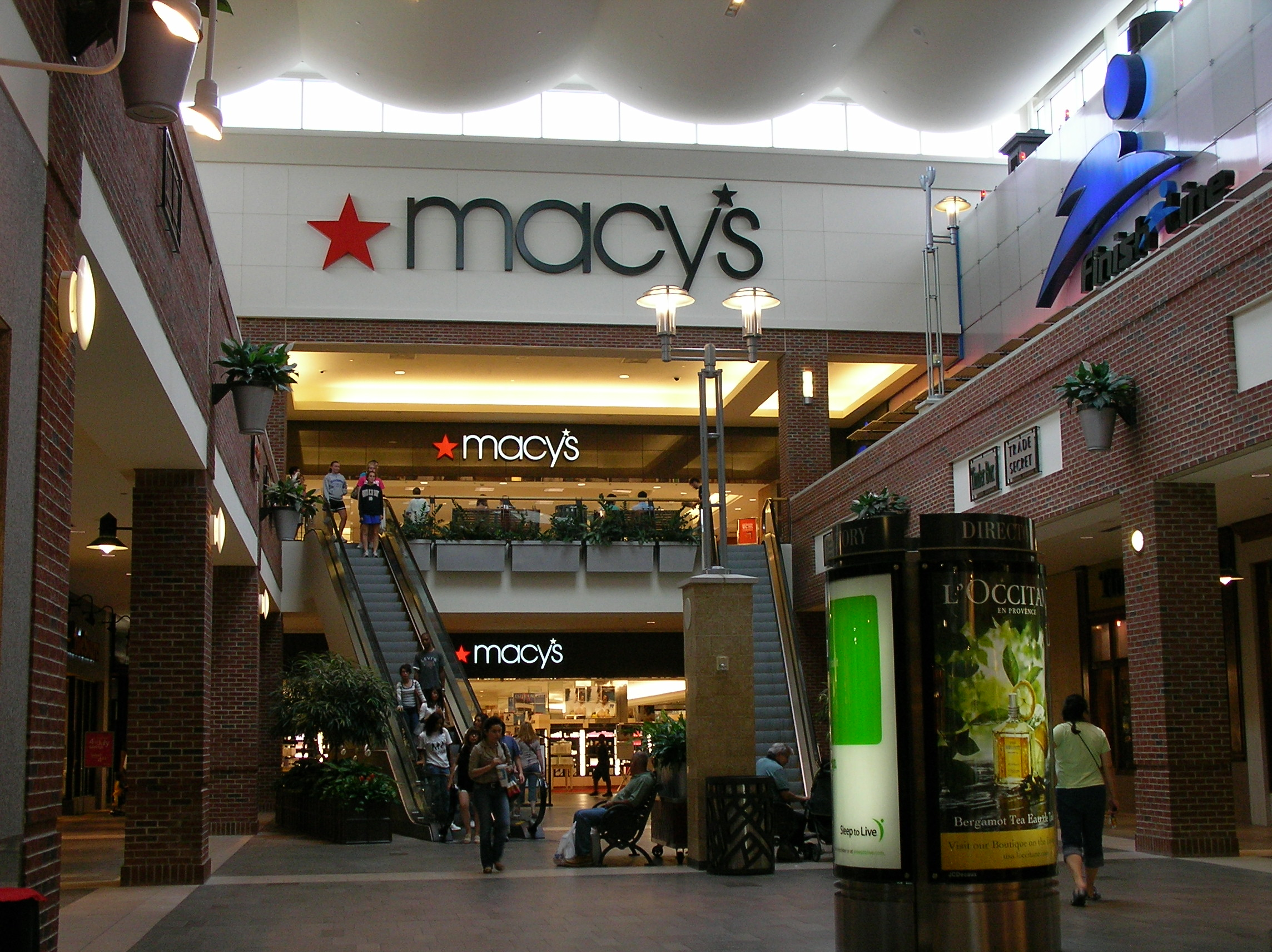
Macy's in the mall

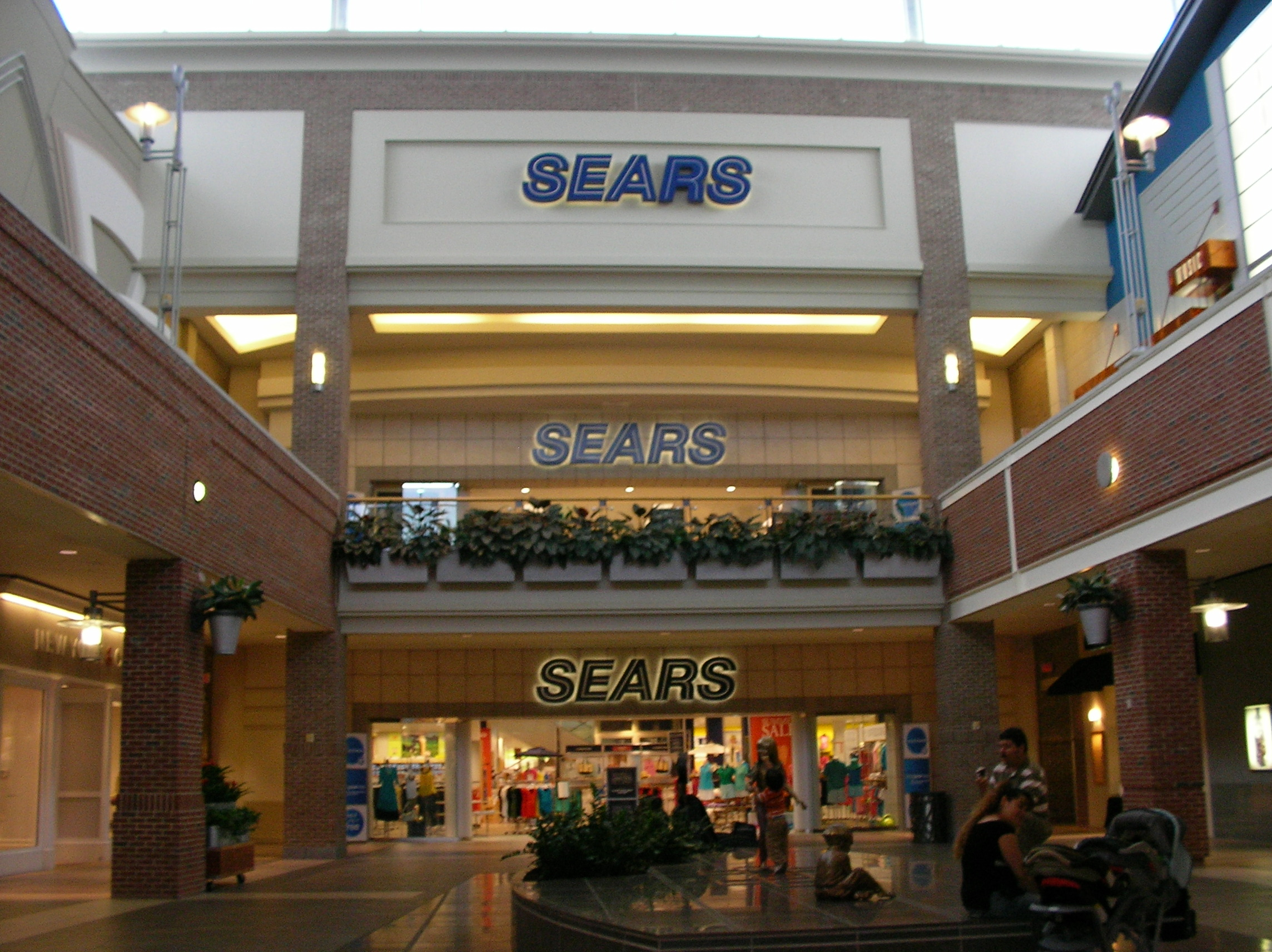
Former Sears in the mall

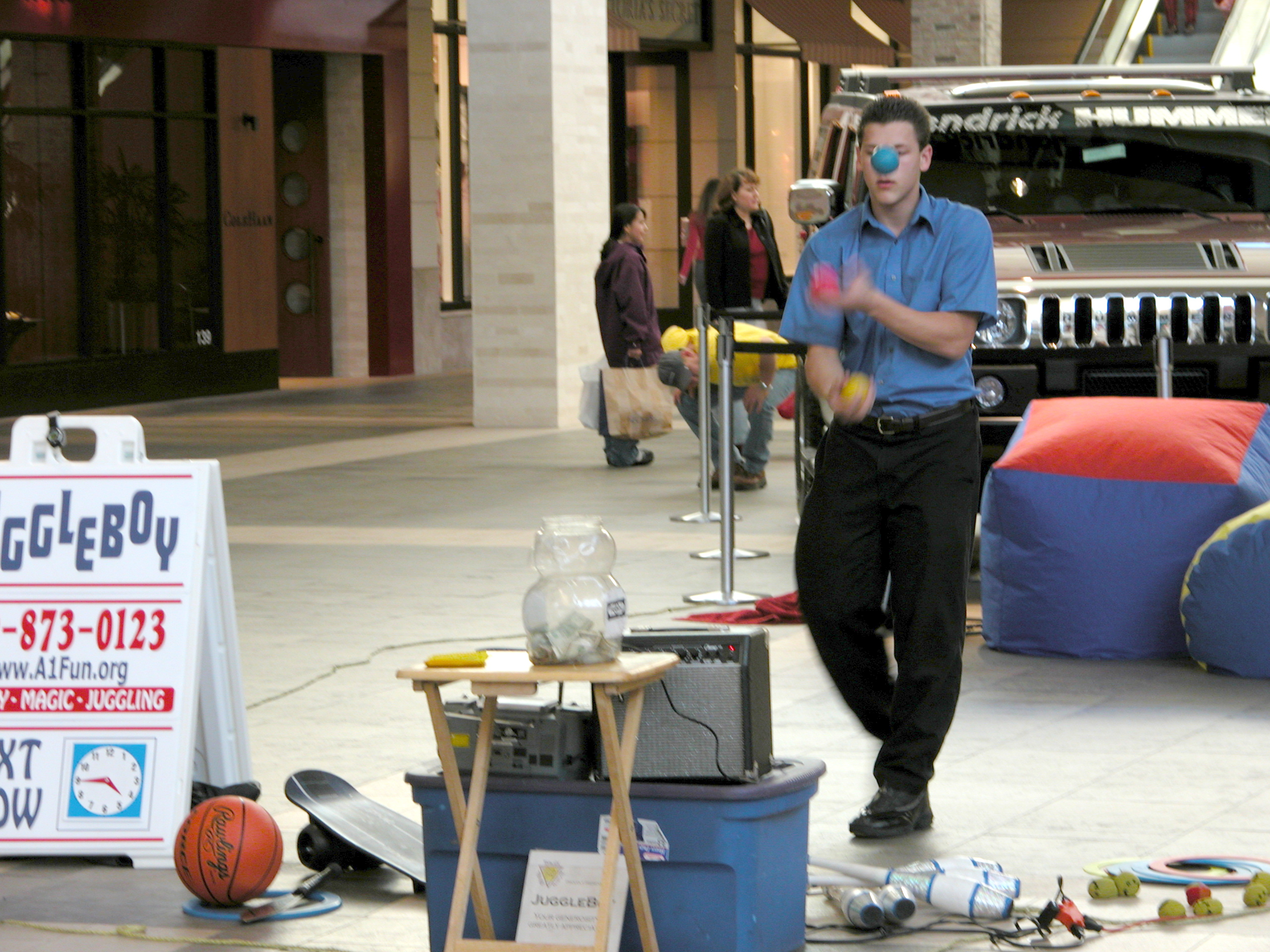
A juggler performs at the mall
