= JMB Realty =

Chicago real estate company

- Type: Private
- Industry: Real estate investment trust
- Founded: 1968; 58 years ago
- Fate: Split into Urban Shopping Centers & JMB Financial Advisors.
- Headquarters: Chicago, Illinois
- Subsidiaries: Xanterra Travel Collection; Amfac; Randsworth Trust P.L.C

JMB Realty is a real estate investment company based in Chicago. In 1993, after suffering during the early 1990s recession, the company spun off its retail properties as Urban Shopping Centers, Inc., which was acquired by Rodamco in 2000 and broken up.

== History ==
The company was founded as Robert Judelson & Co. in 1968. In October 1969, Judelson was joined by University of Illinois roommates Neil Bluhm and Judd Malkin. Judelson split from the partnership in 1973 to form Balcor Company with Jerry Reinsdorf. Bluhm became chairman and Malkin was president.

In 1983, JMB acquired Federated Stores Realty from Federated Department Stores (now Macy's, Inc.) for $112 million.

In 1984, it acquired Urban Development from Aetna for $45 million in cash and $131 million in notes. At that time the company had a $9 billion real estate portfolio.

In 1985, it acquired the portion of Water Tower Place that it did not already own. In 1986, the company acquired a real estate portfolio in Century City for $600 million from Alcoa. In 1987, the company acquired Arvida (now St. Joe Company), a developer of planned communities in Florida and Georgia, from The Walt Disney Company for $400 million. It also acquired Cadillac Fairview, Canadian developer-owner of shopping centers and office buildings, for $2.6 billion.

In 1988, it acquired Amfac, a large Hawaii sugar cane land owner for $920 million.

In 1989, it acquired Randsworth Trust P.L.C. for $800 million. In 1990, it acquired Houston Center for $400 million.

During the early 1990s recession, the company was forced to give some properties to its lenders. In 1993, it reorganized and completed the corporate spin-off and initial public offering of Urban Shopping Centers Inc. Urban later acquired Houston Galleria and Century Square Shopping Center. In 1997, Urban sold Copley Place for $300 million.

In 2000, Urban Shopping Centers was acquired by Rodamco, who later sold Urban to a small consortium of The Rouse Company, Westfield Group, and Simon Property Group in 2002.

In 2002, Amfac was put into bankruptcy. As part of the bankruptcy reorganization, JMB formed Xanterra Travel Collection, which was acquired by Philip Anschutz in 2008.
