= Moxy Hotels =

Hotel chain owned by Marriott

- Type: Subsidiary
- Industry: Hospitality
- Founded: September 1, 2014; 12 years ago
- Founder: Marriott International; IKEA; The Lightstone Group
- Headquarters: Bethesda, Maryland, U.S.
- Number of locations: 181
- Area served: Worldwide
- Parent: Marriott International
- Website: https://www.marriott.com/brands/moxy-hotels.mi

Moxy Hotels, or just Moxy, is a select service (Note: Sometimes, Moxy Hotels would be classed as "limited service," but most of the time, it's either "Select" or "Select Service.") hotel brand founded by Marriott International in 2014, in partnership with IKEA and the Lightstone Group, with the first hotel opening in Milan. As of 2026, the hotel chain has 181 properties.

== History ==
=== Origins ===
The earliest known origins of Moxy was in 2010, when The Lightstone Group began developing a new hotel concept aimed at younger audiences as well as offering affordable accommodations in urban markets with no compromises on design and comfort. The rooms were inspired by the small hotel rooms mostly found in Europe that reduce inefficiencies that traditional hotels usually have.

Lightstone then developed rooms with many space-saving features like pegboards instead of closets and collapsible furniture, similar to rooms in cruise ships. The rooms emphasized functionality while also incorporating furnishings, good quality beds, and fixtures that were intended to optimize very little space.

Along with the room design, Lightstone designed the lobbies to be multi-purpose rooms, that would also serve as a bar, which were different from traditional hotel lobbies which are often mostly empty. Lightstone was confident that Moxy aligned with this vision, and they collaborated with Marriott International and IKEA. They soon adapted it to include enhanced design elements and on-site dining and entertainment, particularly suited to large and populous cities like Miami, Los Angeles and New York. Lightstone intended that it would be playful, stylish, affordable and highly sociable.

=== Foundation and early days ===
Moxy Hotels was later announced by Marriott International in 2013, in partnership with IKEA and Lightstone. The first location opened in Milan, Italy near Milan Malpensa Airport on September 1, 2014. The chain mainly targeted price-sensitive millenial travelers.

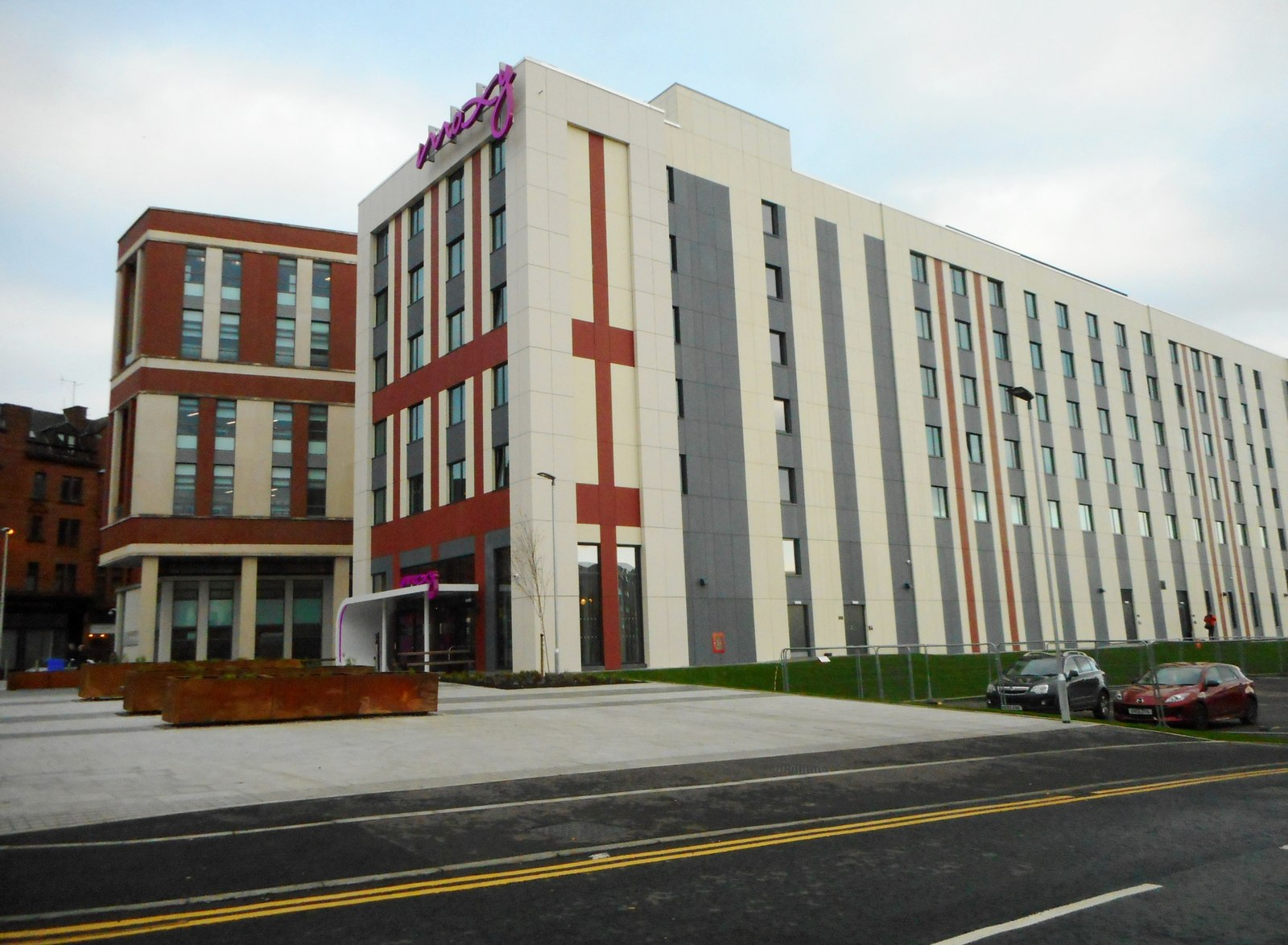
A Moxy hotel in Glasgow.

=== Continued development ===
In 2019, Moxy Hotels expanded to the United States, with two new locations in New Orleans and Tempe, Arizona. In 2022, Moxy launched "Moxy Universe, Play Beyond," an augmented reality experience exclusive to properties in Asia and Oceania. In 2025, Moxy Hotels launched their 100th property in Europe, the Middle East and Africa with the introduction of Moxy Belfast City. Later in 2026, Moxy increased their presence in the Middle East and Africa. In 2025, Marriott International announced that Hotel Equities would operate a dual-branded property in Vancouver, set to open in summer 2028. Half of the property would be the Moxy Vancouver Downtown, which would be part of Moxy, while the other half would be the Element Vancouver Downtown, which would be part of Element, another limited service Marriott brand. (Note: Element falls under "Extended Stay," but it is technically a limited service brand.)

== Selected properties ==
Name	City	Status	Opening Year	Notes
Moxy Milan Malpensa Airport	Milan, Italy	Operating	2014	The very first Moxy hotel.
Moxy New Orleans	New Orleans, Louisiana	Operating	2016	The first Moxy hotel in America.
Moxy Phoenix Tempe/ASU Area	Tempe, Arizona	Operating	2016	
Moxy Bandung	Bandung City, West Java, Indonesia	Operating	2017	The first Moxy hotel in the Asia-Pacific.
Moxy Portland Downtown	Portland, Oregon	Operating	2021	
Moxy Sydney Airport	Sydney, Australia	Operating	2023	
Moxy Bengaluru Airport Prestige Tech Cloud	Karnataka, India	Operating	2024	
Moxy Bangkok Ratchaprasong	Bangkok, Thailand	Operating	2024	The first Moxy Hotel in Thailand.
Moxy Putrajaya	Putrajaya, Malaysia	Operating	2024	
Moxy Solo	Surakarta, Indonesia	Operating	2024	
Moxy Mumbai Andheri West	Mumbai, India	Operating	2024	
Moxy Belfast City	Belfast, Northern Ireland	Operating	2025	The 100th Moxy hotel.

== Sources ==
- George, Richard (2025). "Market Segmentation, Targeting, and Positioning". Marketing Tourism and Hospitality. Cham: Springer Nature Switzerland. doi:10.1007/978-3-031-65983-6_7. ISBN 978-3-031-65982-9.
- Youssofi, Alexandra; Jeannot, Florence; Jongmans, Eline; Dampérat, Maud (2024). "Designing the digitalized guest experience: A comprehensive framework and research agenda". Psychology & Marketing. 41 (3): 512–531. doi:10.1002/mar.21929. ISSN 0742-6046.
