= Somersville Towne Center =

Shopping mall in Antioch, California, U.S.

- Location: Antioch, California, United States
- Coordinates: 38.00186°N 121.84273°W
- Address: 2550 Somersville Road
- Opened: 1966
- Developer: The Hahn Company
- Owner: Urban Retail Properties
- Num. of stores: 65
- Num. of anchor tenants: 7 (2 open, 5 vacant)
- Floor area: 501,259 sq ft (46,568.5 m^{2})
- Floors: 1 (2 in former Macy's)
- Website: somersvilletownecenter.com

Somersville Towne Center is a regional shopping mall in Antioch, California, United States. Previously named County East Mall until 2004, the 501,259 square feet (46,570 m^{2}) mall is managed by Urban Retail Properties. Originally opened in 1966, it is strategically positioned in one of the fastest growing areas of the San Francisco Bay Area, east Contra Costa County. Along with high population growth, east Contra Costa County is also experiencing sizable household income increases.

Somersville Towne Center is the only enclosed regional shopping mall in east Contra Costa County and also the first such mall in the southeast portion of Antioch. The next closest shopping center of similar size and scale is The Streets of Brentwood open-air shopping center in nearby Brentwood, which opened in 2008. The mall is anchored by 24 Hour Fitness and Smart & Final.

== History ==
Somersville Towne Center opened in April 1966 as County East Shopping Center, an 209,000 square feet (19,420 m^{2}) open-air shopping center developed by The Hahn Company, and was the largest in East Contra Costa County, with W. T. Grant as the original anchor tenant.

In 1973, Sears relocated its store from F Street in downtown Antioch that it operated since 1952, to a new, 72,000 square feet (6,690 m^{2}) building at 2600 Somersville Road at the newly expanded County East Shopping Center. Mervyn's also opened its 12th location at the center on July 8, 1973. In late 1976, JCPenney replaced Grant's as the center's third anchor.

The Hahn Company sold the center to Hexalon Real Estate in 1978. The Macerich Company purchased the center from Hexalon Real Estate in 1986. A major overhaul in the late 1980s transformed the center into an enclosed shopping mall with Gottschalks added as a fourth anchor tenant, and the newly renamed County East Mall was reopened in November 1989.

In November 1996, JCPenney announced that it would close the County East Mall store on January 25, 1997, and was occupied for several years by a furniture retailer until the 97,000 square feet (9,010 m^{2}) building was gutted in mid-2003.

On July 30, 2004, Macy's opened a 107,142 square feet (9,950 m^{2}), two-story anchor on the site of the former JCPenney store. Further expansion brought in a Michael's which later became a Marshalls as a fifth anchor in March 2008. Before the Macy's store opened in 2004, The mall has been changed to its current name in late 2003.

In August 2008, Mervyns announced it would close several underperforming stores, including the 73,000 square feet (6,782 m^{2}) Somersville Towne Center location, which closed in December of that year. Gottschalks also closed their store at the mall in mid-2009 due to bankruptcy, leaving two anchors vacant at the mall. In late 2012, it was announced that a trampoline park was slated to take a portion of the former Gottschalks. In December 2016, half of the former Gottschalks building became a 24 Hour Fitness Super Sport club; the other half of the building remains vacant.

In 2013, Factory 2-U opened a Fallas Paredes store in the former Mervyns location and became an anchor tenant. A year later, the mall was sold by Macerich to Time Equities, with Spinoso Real Estate Group as leasing agent. Marshalls closed in 2013 and the space remained vacant until 2015, when Smart & Final opened up as a replacement tenant. In November 2018, Hibbett Sports opened up in the mall, replacing the spaces that Hot Topic & Zumiez occupied which closed in 2013 & 2018, respectively.

On August 6, 2019, it was announced that Sears would be closing the Somersville Towne Center store on October 27, 2019 as part of a plan to close 26 stores nationwide.

On January 8, 2020, it was announced that Macy's would be closing in April 2020 as part of a plan to close 125 stores nationwide. After Macy's closed, Fallas remained as the last anchor with access to the mall interior; it closed in August 2022 and the space is now vacant. As of September 2022, 24 Hour Fitness and Smart & Final are the remaining anchors, though both anchors are inaccessible to the mall interior.

As of 2025, aside from the aforementioned remaining anchors, a Starbucks on the outer portion of the mall property, and the closure of Hibbett Sports, Shiekh Shoes is the last remaining national chain at the mall still in operation. A small number of independent shops also remain in operation.

== Renovations ==
In 1989, County East Mall was converted from an open-air shopping center to an enclosed shopping mall. The mall's most recent renovation was in 2004, which included the name change to Somersville Towne Center along with the opening of the Macy's anchor tenant in a new two-story building, and a cosmetic makeover of the mall's interior. The new construction and makeover, which included new paint, new landscaping, new flooring, and improvements to the mall's entrances, cost a reported US$20 million.
