= Moxey =

Moxey may refer to:

== People ==
- Dean Moxey (born 1986), English professional footballer
- Edward P. Moxey (1881–1943), American accountant
- Eric Moxey (1894–1940), Royal Air Force officer
- Ginger Moxey, Bahamian businesswoman and politician
- Hugh Moxey (1909–1991), English actor
- Jez Moxey (born 1963), football (soccer) executive
- Jim Moxey (born 1953), Canadian ice hockey player
- John Llewellyn Moxey (born 1925), Argentinian film and television director
- Jonathan Moxey (born 1995), American football player
- Osbourne Moxey (born 1978), Bahamian long jumper

== Fiction ==
- Albert Arthur Moxey, a character in the British TV series Auf Wiedersehen, Pet

== See also ==
- Moxie (disambiguation)
- Moxy (disambiguation)
