= Sun Rice (restaurant) =

Filipino restaurant in Portland, Oregon, U.S.

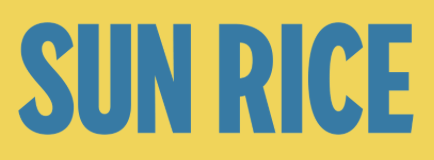

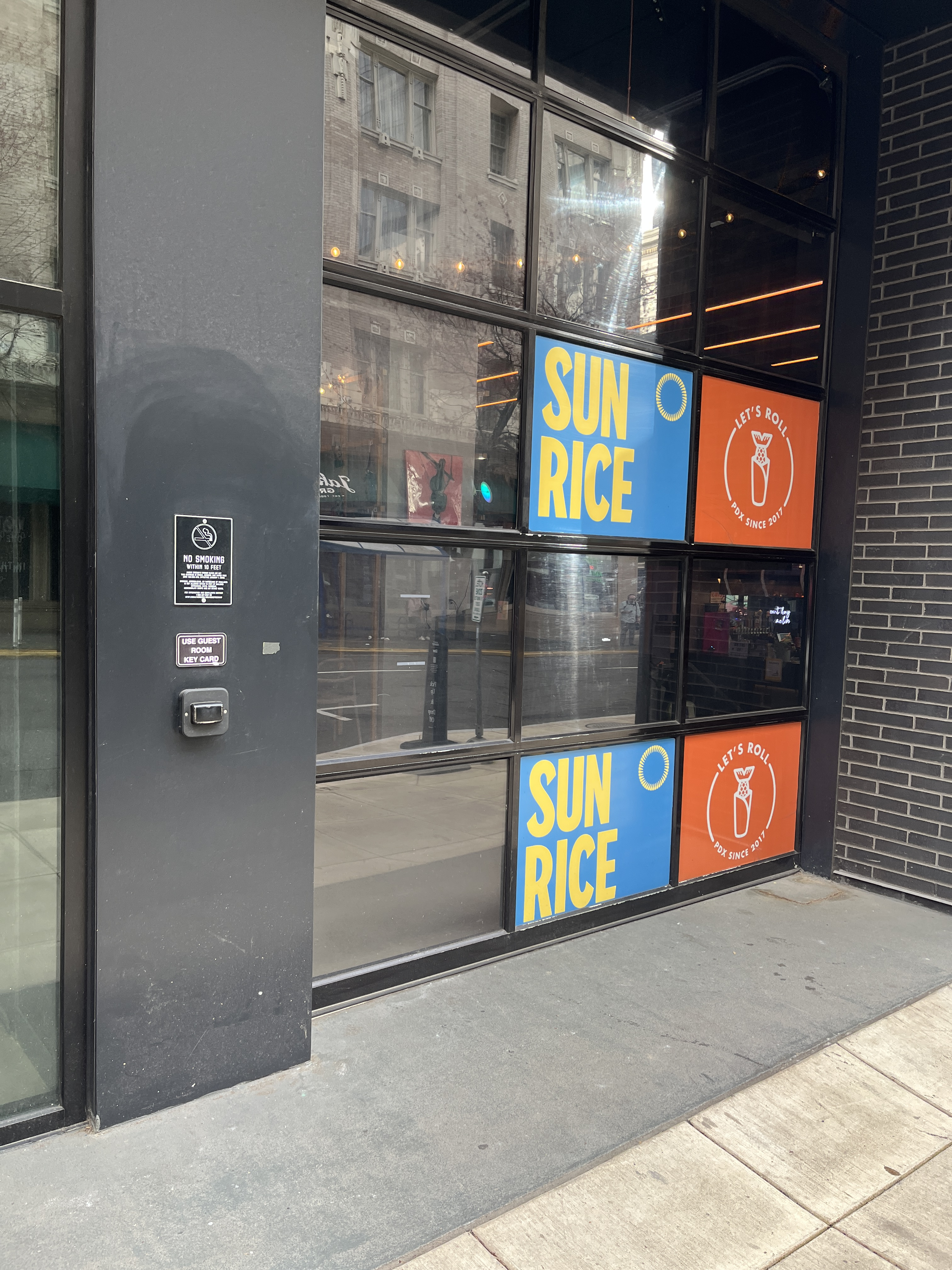
- Sun Rice operating at Moxy Portland Downtown, 2025
- Interactive map of Sun Rice

Restaurant information
- Food type: Filipino
- Location: 4090 North Williams Avenue, Portland, Multnomah, Oregon, 97227, United States
- Coordinates: 45.5532°N 122.6665°W
- Website: sunricepdx.com

Sun Rice (sometimes stylized as SunRice or Sunrice) is a Filipino restaurant in Portland, Oregon, United States. It has operated from the Moxy hotel in downtown Portland and later relocate to the north Portland part of the Boise neighborhood. Previously, the business was a pop-up restaurant called Pulu by Sunrice.

== Description ==
The Filipino restaurant Sun Rice operates the north Portland part of the Boise neighborhood. Previously, the business operated at the Moxy hotel in downtown Portland. The menu includes silogs with options like branzino marinated in sinamak, corned beef, grilled fish, chicken and lamb adobo, and pork belly. There is also a vegetarian variety with maitakes. Sun Rice has also served lemongrass-marinated chicken, lechon kawali, and seared albacore with coconut sauce, as well as a breakfast slider with tocino yogurt sauce, guava iced tea, and doughnuts from HeyDay.

== History ==
TJ Cruz is the chef and co-owner, along with Ken Tran. Prior to opening at Moxy, the business operated as the pop-up Pulu by Sunrice at the cocktail bar Deadshot. In addition to Cruz and Tran, team members included Roberto Almodovar and Justin Dauz. Sun Rice had announced plans to be a vendor at Block 216's food hall in collaboration with Magna Kusina, in an effort to "push Filipino food forward", but plans fell through.

Moxy and Sun Rice have hosted a drag brunch featuring Nicole Onoscopi. Sun Rice has also participated in Sobrang Sarap, a local food tour highlighting Filipino restaurants. In 2023, Sun Rice served bowls of fried rice as free Thanksgiving meals intended for people without holiday plans.

In 2025, the business announced plans to relocate to Williams Avenue in the north Portland part of the Boise neighborhood, operating in the space previously occupied by Chinese restaurant XLB.

== Reception ==
Katherine Chew Hamilton included the corned beef silog in Portland Monthly's list of the city's ten best dishes of 2023. The restaurant was included in Eater Portland's 2024 lists of "fantastic" Filipino restaurants in the metropolitan area and recommended restaurants in downtown Portland.

== See also ==
- Filipino-American cuisine
- List of Filipino restaurants
