= OKC Outlets =

- Location: Oklahoma City, Oklahoma, United States
- Coordinates: 35°27′44″N 97°38′55″W
- Address: 7624 W. Reno Avenue
- Opened: August 5, 2011
- Previous names: The Outlet Shoppes at Oklahoma City (2011–2017)
- Developer: Horizon Group Properties; CBL & Associates Properties
- Manager: Urban Retail Properties
- Owner: The Lightstone Group
- Num. of stores: 87
- Floor area: 394,661 sq ft (40,000 m^{2})
- Floors: 1
- Website: http://www.okcoutlets.com/

OKC Outlets is an outlet mall located in Oklahoma City, Oklahoma. The mall is 394,661 square feet (36,665.2 m^{2}) in size, and is owned by The Lightstone Group and managed by Urban Retail Properties. It opened on August 5, 2011, as The Outlet Shoppes at Oklahoma City, and was developed by Horizon Group Properties and CBL & Associates Properties.

It was proposed to open by November 2009; plans were put on hold because of the economic recession of 2008. Construction began in July 2010. The total cost of the development was $50 million, with $3.9 million of infrastructure improvements paid for by the city of Oklahoma City. It was the largest retail investment of 2010, a down year in new retail construction.

On May 1, 2017, Singerman Real Estate announced that it had acquired the mall from Horizon and CBL for $130 million. On May 22, the mall was renamed OKC Outlets.

In 2026, OKC Outlets was acquired by The Lightstone Group for $80 million. Shortly after, Ohio based Urban Retail Properties announced on its LinkedIn page that it was hired to manage the mall.
