= Moxie (disambiguation) =

Moxie is a regional soda in the United States, the eponym of the word "moxie".

Moxie or MOXIE or similar may also refer to:

- Boldness

== People ==
- Moxie (DJ), a London-based DJ
- Moxiie, a Haitian-American recording artist, singer and songwriter
- Moxie Dalton (1896–1957), U.S. American football player
- Moxie Divis (1894–1955), baseball player
- Moxie Hengel (1857–1924), baseball player
- Moxie Manuel (1881–1924), baseball player
- Moxie Marlinspike, computer security expert
- Moxie Meixell (1887–1982), baseball player
- Moxie Raia (born 1993), U.S. singer

=== Fictional characters ===
- Moxie Mannheim, a DC Comics character
- Moxie, a parody of hobbit Merry Brandybuck in the parody novel, Bored of the Rings
- Moxie Mallahan, a character in Lemony Snicket’s All The Wrong Questions
- Moxxie, a Helluva Boss character

== Places ==
- Moxie Mountain, a mountain in Maine, U.S.
  - Moxie Falls, a nearby waterfall

== Business ==
- Moxies (also Moxie's), Canadian restaurant chain
- The Moxie Institute, a film studio in San Francisco
- Moxie (company), an American interactive marketing agency owned by Publicis Groupe
- Moxie Media, a political consulting firm involved in the Moxie Media scandal

== Entertainment ==
- Moxie (novel), a 2017 young adult novel by Jennifer Mathieu
  - Moxie (film), a 2021 film based on the novel
- Moxie, a 2009 album by British rapper QBoy
- The Moxie Awards, at the Santa Monica Film Festival & Moxie Awards

== Other uses ==
- Moxie (trimaran), historic sailboat launched in 1980
- Mars Oxygen ISRU Experiment, abbreviated MOXIE, an experimental instrument on the NASA Mars 2020 rover
- The Moxie companion robot that went defunct in 2024 and was subsequently revived until 2026

== See also ==
- Moxie plum, a perennial ground vine
- Moxie Girlz, a brand of fashion dolls
- East Moxie, Maine, US; a township
- Moxey (disambiguation)
- Moxy (disambiguation)
