= Urban Retail Properties =

Retail management company

- Type: Private Partnership
- Industry: Retail Management
- Predecessors: Urban Investment and Development; Urban Shopping Centers; JMB Realty
- Headquarters: Chicago, Illinois
- Products: Shopping Malls
- Parent: RAIT Financial Trust; Forum Partners Investment

Urban Retail Properties is a third-party retail management company based in Chicago. The company develops shopping complexes and other retail centers across the United States, in addition to help managing retail space development. The company partnered with Long Runn Urban Development Group in Shanghai in 2008. As of 2021 it owns over 50 shopping centers. A news article in 2003 described Urban Retail as "the nation’s largest third-party retail manager".

== History ==
In 1984, Aetna sold Urban Investment and Development Corporation of Chicago, to JMB Realty, for $1.4 billion.

In 1993, JMB spun off its retail properties into Urban Shopping Centers, and was traded on NYSE and CSE under "URB".

In 2000, Urban was purchased by Rodamco North America.

In 2001, Westfield Trust bought 25% of USC and Rodamco North America. The next year, Rodamco was fully sold to Westfield Group, The Rouse Company, and Simon Property Group.

In May 2005, Urban was purchased in a management buyout deal, becoming a private entity.

In September 2007, RAIT Urban Holdings, LLC acquired a minority interest in Urban.

In May 2014, RAIT Financial Trust purchases Urban Retail Properties.

In September 2018, Urban becomes a private partnership firm when Forum Partners Investment, LLC purchased half of Urban from RAIT.

== Properties owned by Urban Retail ==
Major retail properties owned and managed by Urban Retail include:

=== Current ===
- 110 Tower
- Colony Square Mall
- College Square Mall
- Foothills Mall
- Governors Crossing
- LaCarrete Plaza
- The Mall at Stonecrest
- Monroe Crossing Mall
- OKC Outlets
- Orlando Fashion Square
- The Outlet Collection | Seattle
- Plank Road
- Rock Run Collection
- Shoppes at Isla Verda
- Somersville Towne Center
- Southland Mall
- VU New River

=== Former ===
==== Urban Shopping Centers ====
===== Purchased by Westfield Group =====
- Brandon Town Center
- Century City Shopping Center
- Citrus Park Town Center
- Countryside Mall
- Fox Valley Center
- Franklin Park Mall
- Galleria at Roseville
- Garden State Plaza
- Great Northern Mall
- Hawthorn Center
- MainPlace
- Old Orchard Center
- San Francisco Shopping Centre
- Valencia Town Center

===== Purchased by Simon Property Group =====
- Coral Square Mall
- Copley Place
- Florida Mall
- Houston Galleria
- Mall at Chestnut Hill
- Maplewood Mall
- Miami International Mall
- Penn Square Mall
- Pheasant Lane Mall
- SouthPark Mall
- West Town Mall
- Wolfchase Galleria
- Woodland Hills Mall

===== Purchased by The Rouse Company =====
- Collin Creek
- Lakeside Mall
- North Star Mall (reacquired)
- Oakbrook Center
- Perimeter Mall (reacquired)
- The Streets at Southpoint (under construction at the time)
- Water Tower Place
- Willowbrook (reacquired)

==== Urban Retail ====
- Arnot Mall
- Inlet Square Mall
- Louisiana Boardwalk
- Manhattan Town Center
- Oakland Square
- Oakland Plaza
- Oakland Mall
- PlazAmericas
