= Element Hotels =

Long stay hotel chain by Marriott

- Type: Subsidiary
- Industry: Hospitality
- Founded: 2006; 20 years ago
- Founder: Starwood Hotels & Resorts
- Headquarters: Bethesda, Maryland, U. S.
- Number of locations: Over 100
- Area served: Worldwide
- Parent: Marriott International
- Website: https://element-hotels.marriott.com/

Element Hotels (originally known as Element by Westin) is a long-stay hotel chain run by Marriott International that was launched in 2006. As of 2026, the chain has over 100 locations.

== History ==
=== Under Starwood (2006 - 2016) ===
The chain was announced in 2006 by Starwood Hotels & Resorts as Element by Westin. Starwood intended that the brand would use environmentally friendly and LEED certified materials. It was not until July 3, 2008 when the first location opened in Lexington, Massachusetts. The hotels use eco-friendly materials with energy-efficient lighting and water systems. In 2013, the first Canadian location was introduced in Vaughan, Ontario, and in 2014, the first German location opened in Frankfurt.

=== Marriott days (2016 - now) ===
On the morning of Friday, September 23, 2016, Marriott International bought Starwood for $13 billion, which resulted in Element falling under the Marriott umbrella. By the end of 2016, the chain had 23 locations. Shortly after in 2017, the first Southeast Asian location opened in Kuala Lumpur, and between 2021 and 2022, Element opened more locations in the Asia-Pacific.

On February 16, 2023, Element Hotels opened their 100th property in the downtown area of Salt Lake City, Utah. The property is part of a dual-branded property, with the other being part of Le Méridien, another former Starwood brand.

In 2025, Marriott International has also announced that Hotel Equities would operate a dual-branded property in Vancouver, set to open in summer 2028. Half of the property would be the Element Vancouver Downtown, which would be part of Element, while the other half would be Moxy Vancouver Downtown, which would be part of Moxy, another limited service Marriott brand.

== Selected properties ==
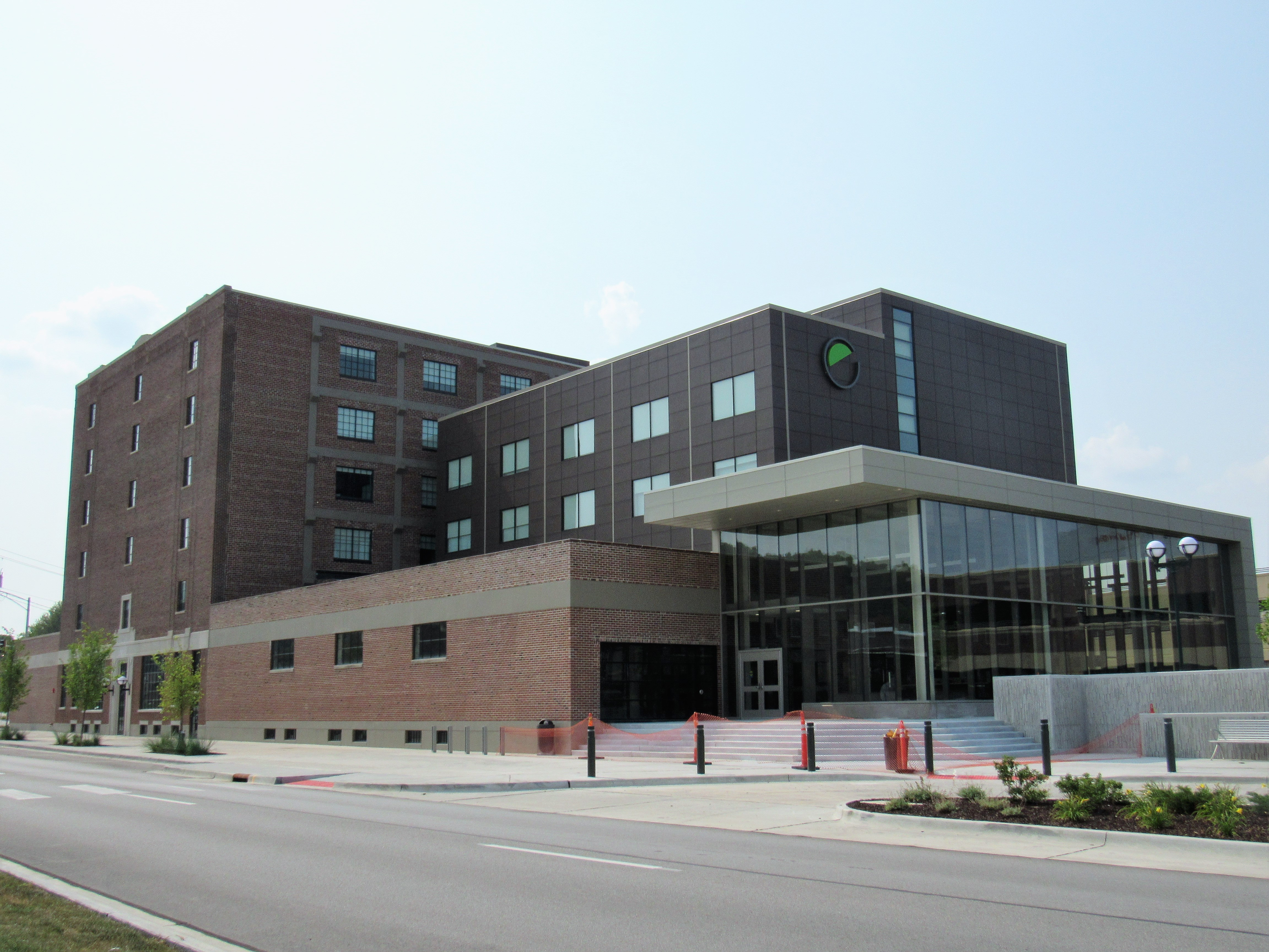
An Element hotel in Moline, Illinois.

Name	City	Status	Opening	Notes
Element by Marriott Lexington	Lexington, Massachusetts	Operating	July 3, 2008	The first Element property.
Element by Marriott Vaughan Southwest	Vaughan, Ontario	Operating	September 11, 2013	The first Element property in Canada.
Element Frankfurt Airport	Frankfurt, Germany	Operating	August 29, 2014	The first Element property in Germany.
Element by Marriott Kuala Lumpur	Kuala Lumpur, Malaysia	Operating	May 4, 2017	The first Southeast Asian Element property.
Element Moline	Moline, Illinois	Operating	February 2018	First Element property in all of Illinois.
Element Anaheim Resort Convention Center	Anaheim, California	Operating	July 2021	
Element by Marriott Reno Experience District	Reno, Nevada	Operating	December 22, 2022	
Element by Marriott Salt Lake City Downtown	Salt Lake City, Utah	Operating	January/February 2023	The 100th Element property.
Element by Marriott Vancouver Downtown	Vancouver, British Columbia	Under construction/proposed	Summer 2028	
