= Extended Stay America =

American hotel chain

Extended Stay America, Inc.
- Formerly: Extended Stay Hotels
- Type: Private
- Traded as: Nasdaq: STAY (2013–2021)
- Industry: Hotels
- Founded: August 1997 in Fort Lauderdale, Florida
- Founders: Wayne Huizenga; George D. Johnson, Jr.
- Headquarters: Charlotte, North Carolina, U.S.
- Number of locations: 650 hotels (2022)
- Area served: North America
- Key people: Greg Juceam (CEO)
- Revenue: ▼$1.218 billion (2019)
- Net income: ▼$0.165 billion (2019)
- Total assets: ▲$4.030 billion (2019)
- Total equity: ▼$1.176 billion (2019)
- Number of employees: 1,800 (2019)
- Website: extendedstayamerica.com

Extended Stay America, Inc., is the American operator of an economy apartment hotel chain in the United States and Canada headquartered in Charlotte, North Carolina. Prior to June 2021, when the company was acquired by Blackstone Real Estate and the Starwood Capital Group, it was publicly traded as a "paired share" with ESH Hospitality, Inc., a real estate investment trust and the owner of the hotels. As of 2022, there are 650+ Extended Stay America branded hotels.

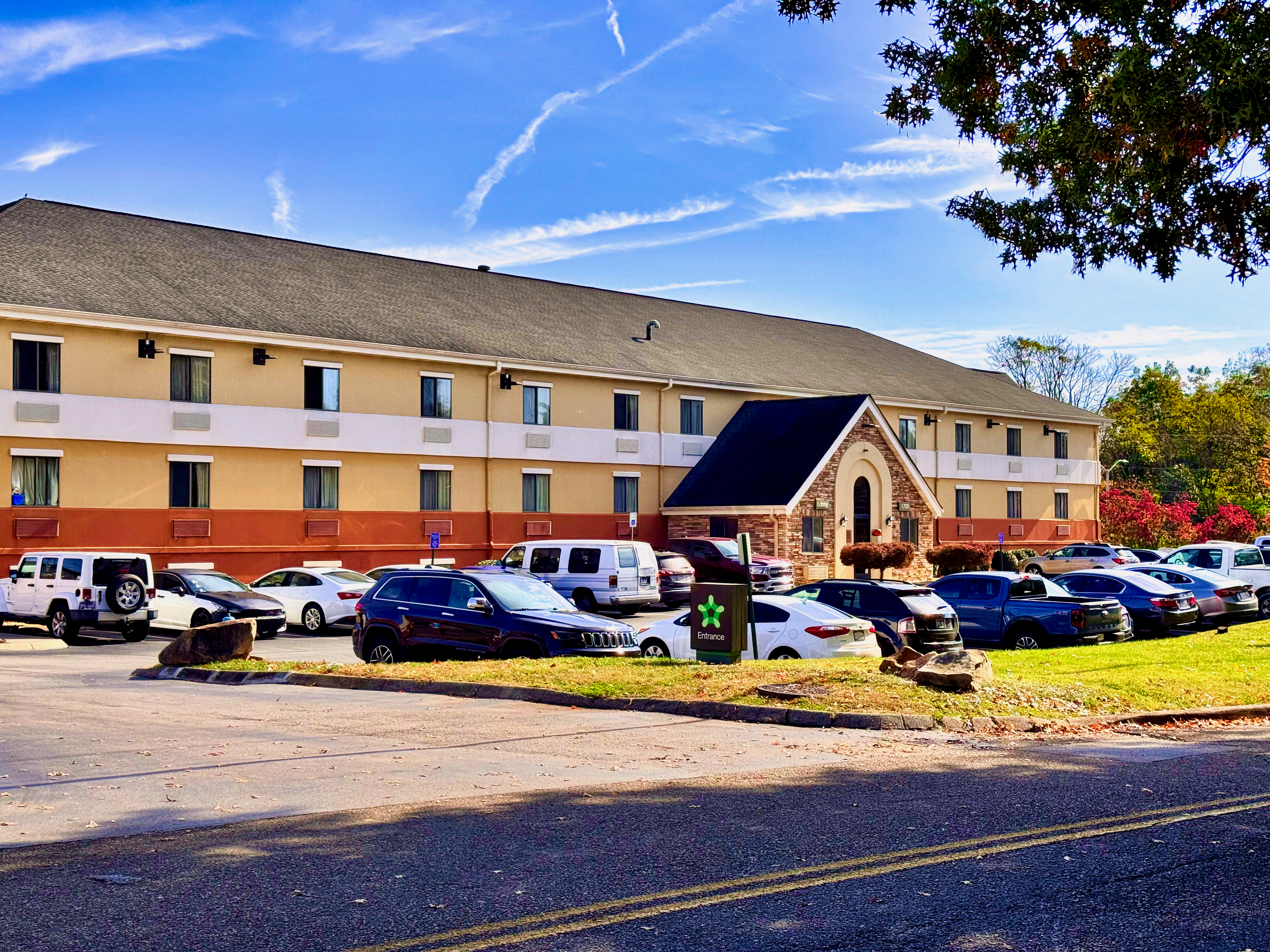
Extended Stay America in Knoxville, Tennessee

== History ==
Extended Stay America was founded on January 9, 1995 in Fort Lauderdale, Florida, by George D. Johnson, Jr. and Wayne Huizenga, both former executives from Viacom and its subsidiary Blockbuster LLC. The first two Extended Stay America hotels opened in August 1995 in Spartanburg, South Carolina, and Marietta, Georgia.

The company became a public company via an initial public offering on December 14, 1995.

Extended Stay America acquired the extended-stay hotel chain StudioPLUS on April 11, 1997. The company also developed the Crossland Economy Studios brand as a budget extended-stay hotel brand. The 47 unit Crossland brand was sold to Westmont Hospitality Group for $285 Million in December, 2015.

In 2013, the company moved its headquarters from Spartanburg, South Carolina, to Charlotte, North Carolina.

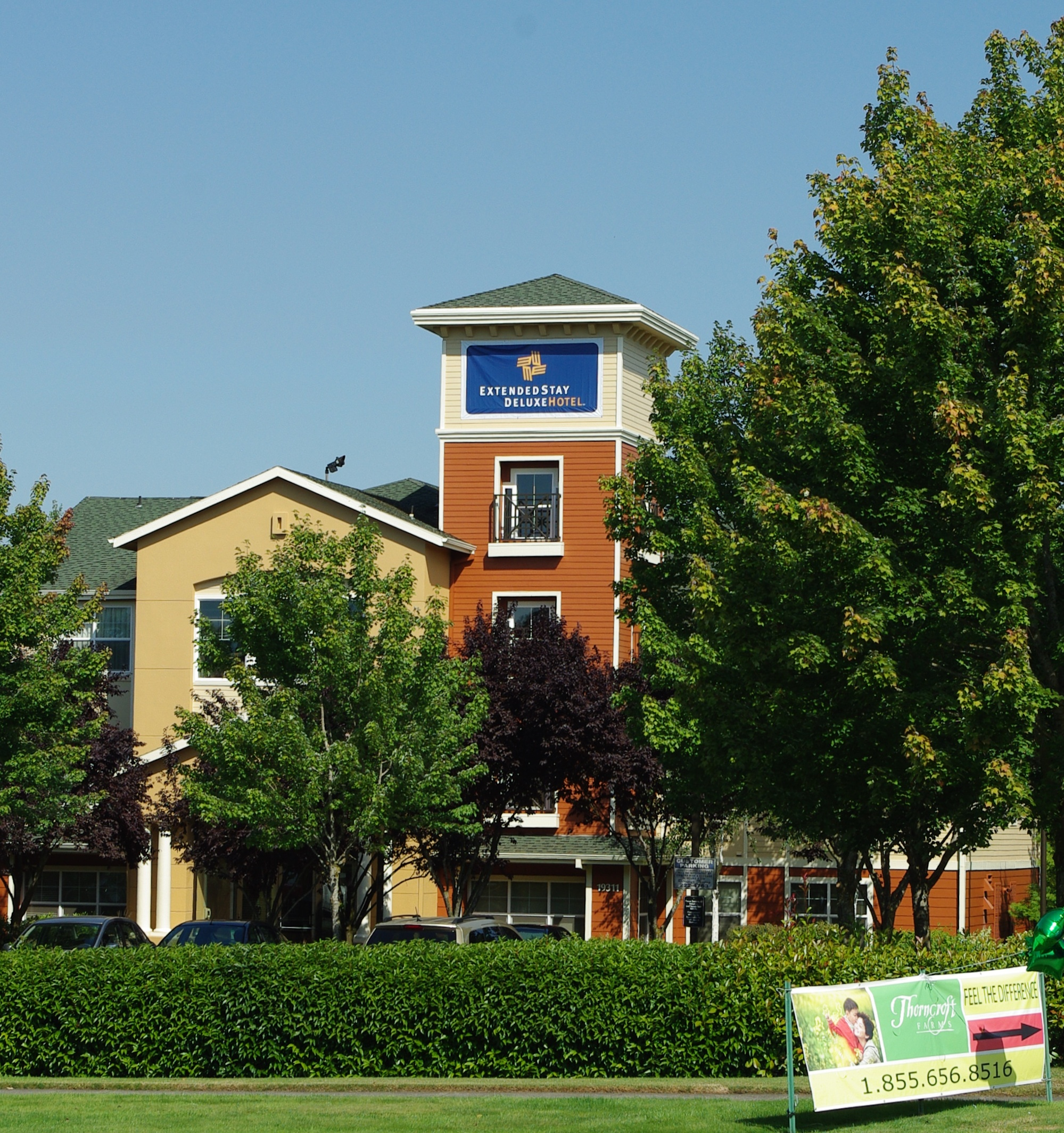
An Extended Stay Deluxe hotel in Hillsboro, Oregon

Blackstone Inc., a private equity firm, acquired Extended Stay America in May 2004 for US$3.1 billion in cash and debt. At the time of the merger, Extended Stay America operated 475 hotels; Blackstone increased that number with the addition of 132 from Homestead Studio Suites. Homestead, which was founded by Security Capital in 1992, had been acquired by Blackstone in November 2001 for US$740 million. All of Blackstone's extended-stay hotels consisting of the Crossland, Extended Stay America, Homestead, StudioPlus, and eventually Extended Stay Deluxe brands were managed together by Extended Stay Hotels.

In June 2007, Blackstone sold Extended Stay Hotels to the Lightstone Group for US$8 billion. The deal, financed with US$7 billion of debt, was one of several multi-billion dollar hotel and casino sales made that year.

The Great Recession decimated leisure and business travel and Extended Stay faced shortages in liquidity stemming from the leveraged buyout by Lightstone. On June 15, 2009, Extended Stay America filed for bankruptcy protection under Chapter 11. Through debtor-in-possession financing, it was able to continue operating rather than to face liquidation.

In July 2010, an investment consortium made up of Blackstone, Paulson & Co. and Centerbridge Partners bought Extended Stay America through a bankruptcy auction for US$3.93 billion.

After its successful reorganization, Extended Stay America emerged from bankruptcy in October 2010.

A year after the bankruptcy, Blackstone was sued by creditors of Extended Stay America alleging that Blackstone "skimmed" US$2.1 billion off of the sale to Lightstone and knew that the amount of debt would have been unsustainable for the hotel chain. Blackstone settled the lawsuit in June 2013 for US$10 million.

In April 2020, The Blackstone Group acquired a 4.9% stake in the company and Starwood Capital Group acquired an 8.5% stake in the company. The company went private in June 2021 when Blackstone Real Estate and the Starwood Capital Group acquired the remaining shares and the company was delisted from Nasdaq.

== Properties ==
As of December 31, 2019, the company owned and operated 557 hotel properties consisting of approximately 61,900 rooms and franchised or managed 73 hotel properties consisting of approximately 7,500 rooms.
