= The Lightstone Group =

American real estate business

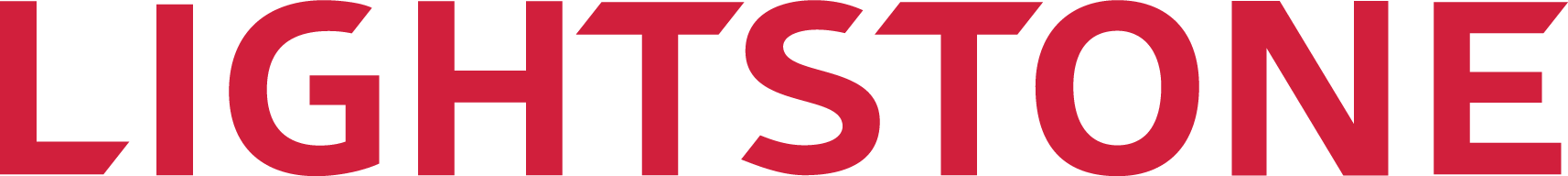
- Type: Privately-held company
- Industry: Real estate, Private equity, Private credit
- Founded: 1986; 40 years ago
- Founder: David Lichtenstein
- Headquarters: New York City
- Area served: New Jersey; Maryland; Illinois; California; North Carolina; Michigan; New York
- Number of employees: Over 570
- Website: www.lightstonegroup.com

The Lightstone Group is a privately held real estate investment company that owns and operates a portfolio of multifamily, office, industrial, hotel, life sciences, and retail properties. Founded by David Lichtenstein following his first property purchase in June 1986, the company has since invested in both individual real estate assets and real estate operating companies. As of November 2024, Lightstone manages more than 200 properties with over $12 billion in assets under management.

The company's portfolio of real estate properties spans more than 28 U.S. states, and includes approximately 25,000 multifamily units, over 15 million square feet of industrial, logistics, life sciences, and commercial properties. The company is an active developer and operator of Moxy Hotels in partnership with Marriott, with locations in New York City, Los Angeles, and Miami.

The Lightstone Group has more than 570 employees, and is headquartered in New York City with regional offices in California, New Jersey, Maryland, Illinois, Michigan and North Carolina. Beacon Management is a subsidiary of Lightstone that manages the company’s residential properties. Baltimore, Maryland-based Paragon Outlets is an affiliate of Lightstone, and manages the company's retail portfolio.

== Residential Development ==
Lightstone has developed residential properties across several New York City neighborhoods, including Long Island City, Gowanus, Yorkville, and the Financial District.

Its portfolio includes luxury condominiums such as 130 William, an 800-foot tower designed by Sir David Adjaye, and 40 East End, an 18-story, 100,000-square-foot building designed by Deborah Berke Partners.

130 William, a 66-story condominium, was among the top-selling properties in New York City in 2023, with approximately 90 percent of its units sold by July—just one month after the building’s completion in June. The building’s penthouse was also featured in an episode of NBC’s “Law & Order.”

Lightstone’s luxury rental properties in New York City include ARC in Long Island City and 365 Bond, which was the first residential development along the Gowanus Canal.

== Retail ==
In 2003 Lightstone acquired Prime Retail, one of the largest owners and operators of shopping malls, for $638 million. It recapitalized Prime Retail with Simon Property Group for $2.24 billion in 2009. Simon Property Group is an American real estate investment trust that invests in shopping malls, outlet centers, and community/lifestyle centers and is the largest owner of shopping malls in the United States

In November 2024, Lightstone acquired its first outlet mall, The Outlet Collection Seattle, a 943,000-square-foot shopping mall in Auburn, Washington for $82 million.

In September 2026, Lightstone acquired its second outlet mall, OKC Outlets, a 394,661 square-foot shopping mall in Oklahoma City, Oklahoma for $80 million.

== Reinsurance ==
Converge RE II, a Lightstone affiliate based in Puerto Rico, is a Class 5 reinsurer operating through the International Insurance Center (IIC) with an A rating. The company provides reinsurance services to life and annuity insurers, with a focus on supporting capital reallocation and financial efficiency.

== Moxy Hotels ==
Beginning in 2010, Lightstone began developing a new hotel concept aimed at offering affordable accommodations in urban markets without compromising on design and comfort. Drawing inspiration from the smaller hotel rooms commonly found in Europe, the company introduced micro rooms to reduce the inefficiencies associated with traditional large-scale luxury hotels.

The concept was influenced by the layout of cruise ships, where rooms are compact but functional, and travelers typically spend their time engaging with amenities or exploring destinations. Applying a similar approach, Lightstone developed rooms with space-saving features such as pegboards instead of closets and collapsible furniture. The design emphasized functionality while incorporating high-quality beds, furnishings, and fixtures intended to optimize limited space.

In tandem with room design, Lightstone focused on creating communal spaces and hospitality experiences that reflected changing consumer behaviors. Their hotel lobbies were designed to serve multiple functions—acting as co-working spaces, dining areas during the day, and social lounges in the evening. Believing that Marriott’s Moxy brand aligned with this vision, Lightstone partnered with the brand and adapted it to include enhanced design elements and on-site dining and entertainment, particularly suited to cities like New York, Los Angeles, and Miami.

Lightstone opened Moxy Times Square, the brand’s first property in New York City, in 2017. This was followed by the development of Moxy Chelsea in 2018, Moxy East Village in 2019, and Moxy Miami South Beach in 2022.

The expansion in New York City continued with the opening of Moxy Lower East Side in 2022, followed by Moxy Williamsburg in 2023.

Moxy Hotels Awards and Recognitions

- The Moxy/AC Hotel Downtown Los Angeles was named Development of the Year at the 2023 and 2024 Americas Lodging Investment Summit (ALIS).
- Moxy Times Square received the Development of the Year – Select/Limited Service award from ALIS in 2017.
- Moxy Times Square, Moxy Chelsea, Moxy East Village, Moxy Lower East Side and Moxy Williamsburg have been recognized in Condé Nast Traveler’s Readers’ Choice Awards as top hotels in New York City.
- Moxy Miami South Beach was included in Condé Nast Traveler’s Readers’ Choice Awards for Miami.
- Lightstone was named Developer of the Year at Marriott’s CONNECT 2020 Awards.
- Moxy Hotels was named Best Affordable Hotel Brand by The Points Guy in 2023.

== Awards and Recognitions ==
- 2025 Award of Merit for Multi-Unit Residential Buildings from Azure Magazine
- Crain's New York Business named Lightstone one of the Best Places to Work in New York City, ranking it in the top 100 in 2023 and 2024
- Mitchell Hochberg and David Lichtenstein have been included multiple times in Commercial Observer’s Power 100 list, including 2023 (rank: 60), 2024 (rank: 55), 2025 (rank: 62) and 2026 (rank: 68)
- 2023 Residential Architect Design Award from Architect magazine
- 2020 Residential Concept Award from The Architecture Community’s International Residential Architecture Awards
- 2018 BQDA Queens People’s Choice Award from the American Institute of Architects (AIA) Brooklyn + Queens Design Awards -- For ARC
- 2018 Award of Merit Special Recognition for Unique Exposed Architectural/ Structural Concrete from the Roger H. Corbetta Awards Program -- For ARC
- 2017 BQDA Award of Merit People’s Choice Award from the American Institute of Architects (AIA) Brooklyn + Queens Design Awards -- For 365 Bond

Mitchell Hochberg and David Lichtenstein have been included multiple times in Commercial Observer’s Power 100 list

== Multifamily Investment ==
Lightstone's national multifamily portfolio comprises over 25,000 units. In December 2021, the company acquired a portfolio of more than 7,800 apartments in Michigan from Hartman & Tyner for approximately $1 billion.

== Lightstone Capital ==
Lightstone Capital, the firm's real estate debt platform, was established in 2018. Since its launch, it has originated approximately $2 billion in transactions. The platform provides financing secured by real estate assets located in gateway markets.

== Lightstone DIRECT ==
Lightstone DIRECT is a private real estate investment platform launched in November 2025 by Lightstone. The platform provides accredited investors access to institutional-quality private real estate investments, beginning with multifamily and industrial properties, through single-asset offerings. Investments are targeting near-term cash flow and monthly distributions. All Lightstone DIRECT investment opportunities are sourced, executed, and managed by Lightstone’s vertically integrated team, with the firm committing at least 20 percent of equity in each offering. All investments are vetted and approved by Lightstone’s principals, ensuring that Lightstone DIRECT investors benefit from aligned interests.

== Heartland National Insurance Company ==
Lightstone in April 2026 invested in the McDaniel Company, the parent of Heartland National Life Insurance Company, which provides annuity and supplemental health insurance products to the US retirement market. Lightstone would provide funding, investment knowledge, and strategic guidance to support Heartland’s next stage of expansion, including broader annuity and supplemental health offerings.

== Lightstone REITs ==
In 2006, the company offered a $300 million real estate investment trust, which allowed Lightstone to raise money from outside investors for the first time. The non-traded Lightstone Value Plus REIT invested in office, retail, and other commercial properties, and by the end of 2009, was fully invested in a total of 30 properties. By the end of 2011, Lightstone Value Plus I was the 18th largest non-traded U.S. REIT.

In the summer of 2010, the company offered second, non-traded REIT, Lightstone Value Plus II, committing capital to the hospitality, retail, multi-family, and commercial segments. The Lightstone Group committed 10% of the capital raised by the REIT. By December 2011, LVPII had invested in several properties, including the Crowne Plaza Boston hotel, Saxon Hall Rego Park, and TownePlace Metairie hotel in New Orleans.

== Extended Stay Hotels ==
The Lightstone Group acquired Extended Stay Hotels (now trading as Extended Stay America) in June 2007 from The Blackstone Group for US$8 billion. The deal, financed with US$7 billion of debt, was one of several multibillion-dollar hotel and casino sales made that year. On June 15, 2009, Extended Stay America filed for bankruptcy protection under Chapter 11. After the Great Recession decimated leisure and business travel, Extended Stay faced shortages in liquidity stemming from the leveraged buyout by Lightstone two years before. Through debtor-in-possession financing, it was able to continue operating rather than to face liquidation.

In July 2010, an investment consortium made up of Blackstone, Paulson & Co., and Centerbridge Partners bought Extended Stay America through a bankruptcy auction for US$3.93 billion.
