= Moxy Portland Downtown =

Hotel in Portland, Oregon, U.S.

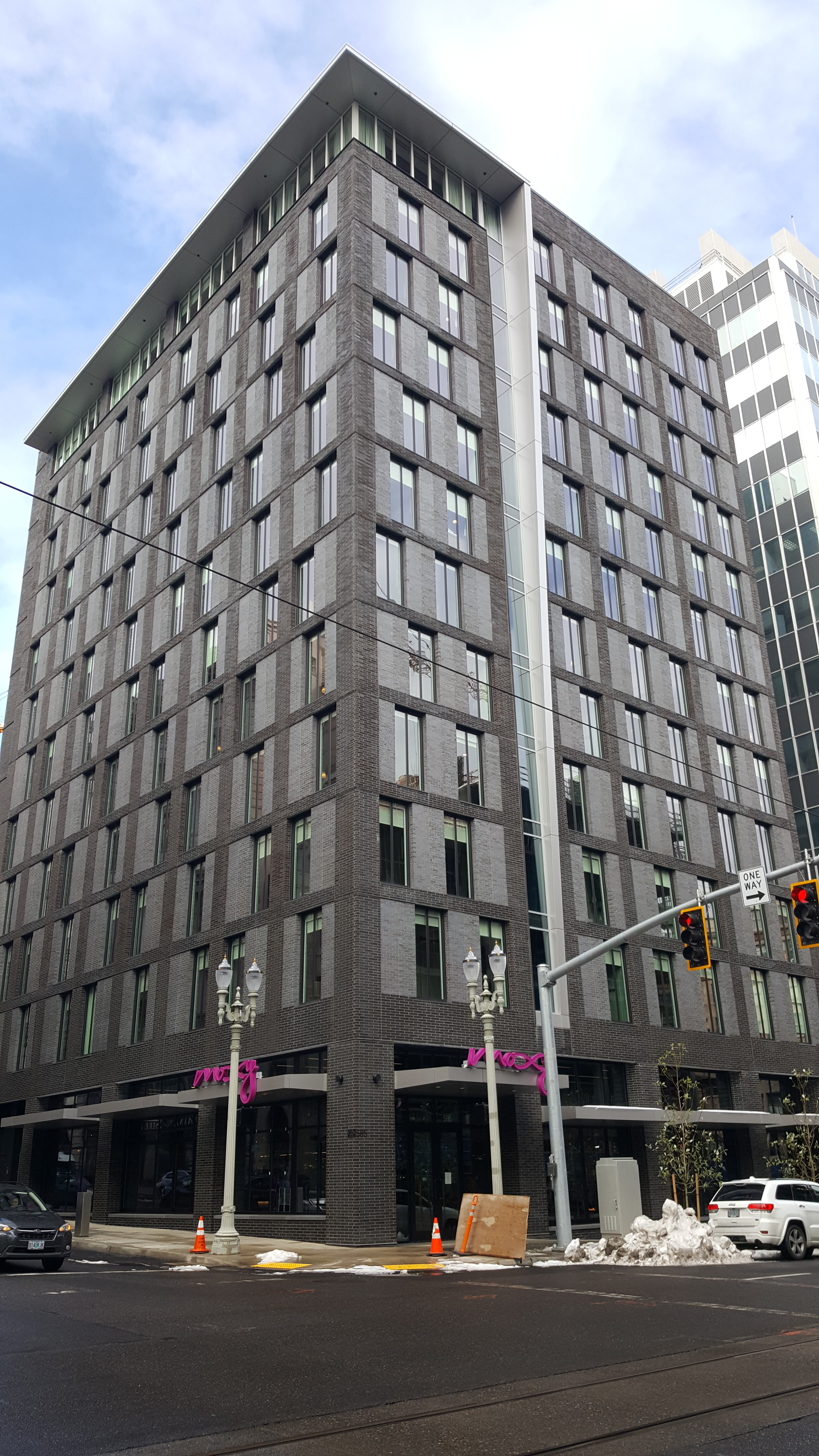
- The hotel's exterior in 2021
- Interactive map of the Moxy Portland Downtown area

General information
- Location: 585 Southwest 10th Avenue, Portland, Oregon, United States
- Coordinates: 45.521389°N 122.680278°W

The Moxy Portland Downtown, often referred to as simply the Moxy Hotel, is a 12-story, 197-room hotel in Portland, Oregon. The Moxy brand is operated by Marriott International.

== History ==
The building was designed by DLR Group for Graves Hospitality. Its food hall has hosted drag brunch.

Justin Sutherland opened the sandwich shop Big E in the hotel in 2022. The business vacated the space in 2023.

The restaurant Sun Rice operated in the hotel, until mid 2025.
