= Prudential Building =

Prudential Building may refer to:

- Eight Forty One - 22-floor office building in Jacksonville, Florida.
- Holborn Bars - originally built for the Prudential Assurrance Company in High Holborn, London
- Houston Main Building - a skyscraper in Houston, Texas
- Museum Square, a.k.a. the SAG-AFTRA Building, former Prudential Building in Miracle Mile, Los Angeles
- One Prudential Plaza - a 41-story structure in Chicago, Illinois
- Guaranty Building (Buffalo, New York) - an early skyscraper in Buffalo, New York.
- Prudential Building - one of several buildings in Newark, New Jersey built for Prudential Financial
- Prudential House - an historic skyscraper hotel in Warsaw, Poland
- Prudential Plaza - Prudential Financial's current main headquarters in Newark, New Jersey
- Prudential Tower - an International Style skyscraper in Boston, Massachusetts
- W. D. Grant Building - an historic building in Atlanta, Georgia
