= Panorama Mall =

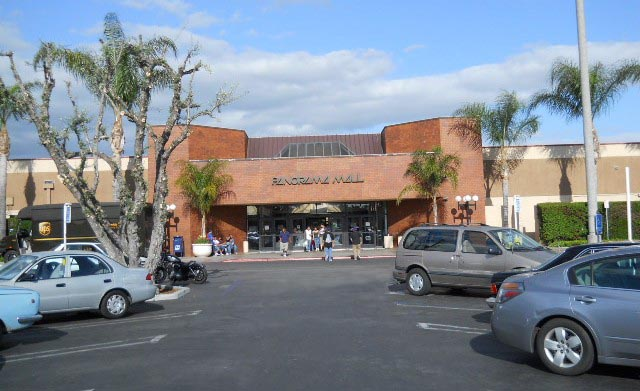
- Location: Panorama City, Los Angeles, California, United States
- Coordinates: 34.22352°N 118.45059°W
- Address: 8401 Van Nuys Boulevard
- Opened: October 10, 1955
- Previous names: Broadway–Valley shopping center Panorama City Shopping Center

Panorama Mall is a mall in Panorama City, San Fernando Valley, Los Angeles, California. It is an enclosed mall anchored by only one large discount store, Walmart.

The mall originally opened as the open-air Broadway–Valley shopping center in 1955. Similar to what happened with nearby Valley Plaza, after opening additional department stores and retail strips opened on the periphery of the Broadway center. During the 1960s the merchants' association of the various owners marketed its retail properties collectively as the Panorama City Shopping Center. In 1964 it claimed to be the first center with four major department stores. Panorama Mall was renovated and enclosed in 1980.

== History ==
The Broadway–Valley shopping center, as it was then known, opened on October 10, 1955, as a single strip of stores along Van Nuys Blvd. north of Roscoe Blvd, with 89,000 square feet (8,300 m^{2}) of retail space adjacent to and sharing a parking lot with a 226,000-square-foot (21,000 m^{2}) Broadway department store designed by architect Welton Becket. Silverwoods, Mandel's, Kinney Shoes, Lerner's and Woolworth were the other stores in the complex.

The anchor department stores opened as follows:

- The Broadway, opened October 10, 1955, 226,000 square feet (21,000 m^{2}), 3 stories, currently Walmart
- Montgomery Ward, opened September 13, 1961, 154,537 square feet (14,357.0 m^{2}), 2 stories, closed in 2001, building demolished in November 2024
- J. W. Robinson's, opened on June 27, 1961
- Ohrbach's, opened October 7, 1964, 115,000 square feet (10,700 m^{2}), 2 stories, 7.5-acre site, cost $5 million to build, currently the Valley Indoor Swap Meet.
- Curacao opened in 1995 closed in February 2025.

A 1964 advertisement promoted 86 stores collectively as the "Panorama City Shopping Center" – not just the Broadway and Silverwoods complex. These included three full-line freestanding department stores within one block of The Broadway.

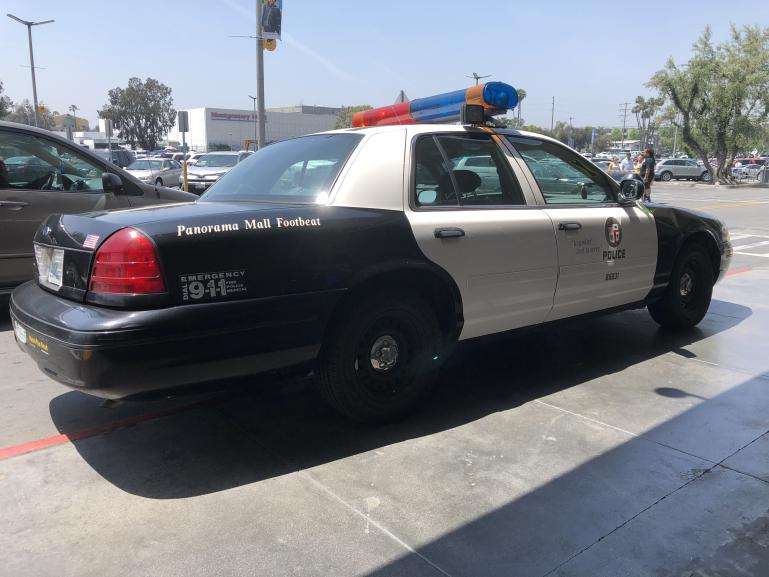
An LAPD cruiser assigned to patrol Panorama Mall.

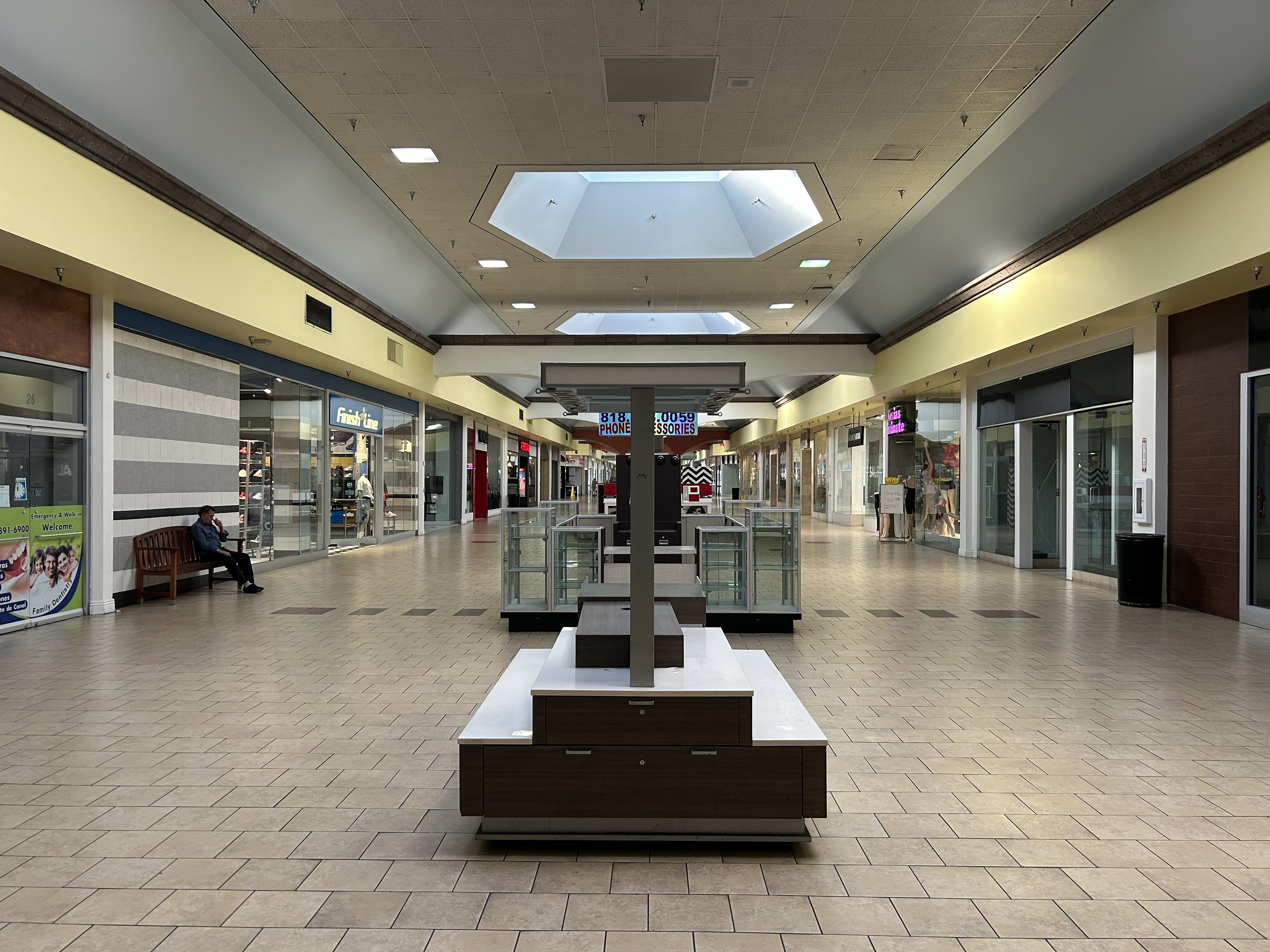
Interior of the Panorama Mall in 2026

By the 1970s, business had declined compared to other regional malls that had opened in the Valley, such as the Sherman Oaks Galleria, Sherman Oaks Fashion Square, and Northridge Fashion Center.

In 1979, the Santa Monica-based Macerich Co. real estate development firm and the Connecticut General Mortgage and Realty Investments Co. bought the mall for $5.8 million, enclosed and renovated it. The $7 million in improvements included a refresh to the look of the mall, new construction including a second strip of shops, plus a roof over the mall walkway. The retail sales area increased to 145,000 square feet (13,500 m^{2}) and the mall was physically connected to the adjacent Broadway store. A large stainless sculpture by artist Sebastian Trovato was added, portraying intertwining rings.

In 1986, the Panorama Mall ranked 40th out of the 61 regional shopping malls in Los Angeles and Orange Counties with more than $68 million in annual sales. Business was improving, according to the manager of the Broadway, but the Los Angeles Times characterized retail in the area as "awaiting revival".

Ohrbach’s would close in September 1986 and the store would be sold to the Indoor Swap Meet in 1986. Robinsons closed in 1987, and would be demolished in 1995. Woolworth closed in the early 90s and the space would be taken up by La Curacao in 1995.

In the late 1990s, Walmart opened in the building vacated by the Broadway after that chain's merger into Federated Department Stores and then Macy's, which was initially what it was supposed to become.

The owners renovated the mall again for $1 million in 2005.

The former Montgomery Ward was torn down in November 2024. Curacao closed in February 2025 due to major construction that is happened to the mall and relocated their inventory to the neighboring store located at Northridge Fashion Center.
