= Ohrbach's =

Department store in New York

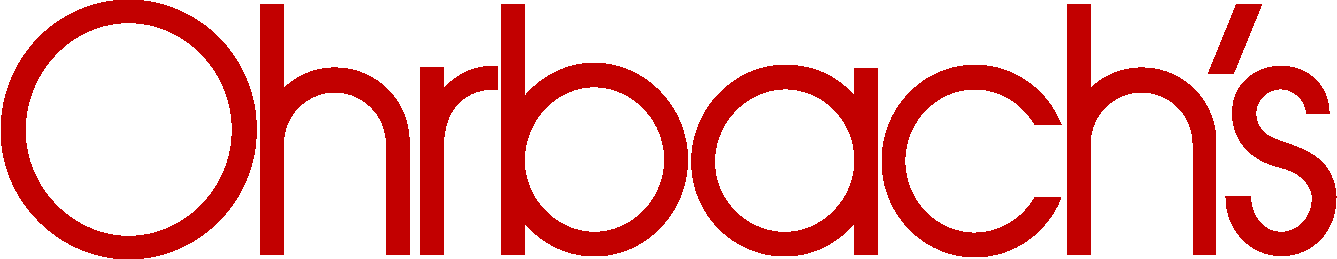
- Company type: Department store
- Industry: Retail
- Founded: 1923
- Defunct: 1987
- Fate: 7 stores closed, 5 others merged into Steinbach
- Headquarters: New York, New York
- Products: Clothing, footwear, bedding, furniture, jewelry, beauty products, and housewares.
- Parent: Amcena

Ohrbach's was a moderate-priced department store with a merchandising focus primarily on clothing and accessories. From its modest start in 1923 until the chain's demise in 1987, Ohrbach's expanded dramatically after World War II, and opened numerous branch locations in the New York and Los Angeles metropolitan areas. Its original flagship store was located on Union Square in New York City. It maintained administrative offices in Newark and in Los Angeles. The retailer closed the Newark offices in the 1970s. Paul László designed the Union Square store as well as many of their other stores.

== History ==
Ohrbach's first store opened on October 4, 1923, in the fire-damaged building where Adolph Zukor operated the world's first nickelodeon. Founder Nathan M. Ohrbach launched his store with partner Max Wiesen, a dress manufacturer. After a time there was a dispute between the partners. Wiesen refused to sell so Ohrbach leased quarters nearby to open a second store thus forcing Wiesen to sell.

=== Sale policies ===
When Ohrbach opened his store, he believed in cutting service to the bare essentials and sharing the savings with his customers. He also priced his goods in even numbers, while most of his competitors priced their goods in odd prices. Wiesen brought women's ready-to-wear in the form of job lots, seconds, manufacturer's overstock and irregulars. Ohrbach sold these in large volume at low prices. After buying Wiesen's interest in 1928, he added men's and children's furnishings and accessories. He started to “trade up” his women's wear and offer higher-style garments. Other policies formalized at this time were: no price advertising, minimal sales force, no alterations, no deliveries, cash and carry and no special sales periods.

=== Expansion to California ===
The growth of the fashion industry in California encouraged the company's expansion to the state. The firm utilized the services of a buying office in Los Angeles as early as 1939, and by 1945 opened its own. In 1948, it leased three floors and the mezzanine in a wing of the Welton Becket–William Wurdeman designed Prudential Insurance Building (now known as Museum Square or the SAG-AFTRA Building) on Wilshire Boulevard’s Miracle Mile.

The success of the Miracle Mile store led the firm to open another branch in Downtown Los Angeles when it acquired the twelve-story Milliron's building at 312 W. 5th St., corner of Broadway in August 1953. At the time, Broadway was approaching the end of its decades-long status as ground zero for mid- to upscale department store shopping for the Los Angeles metropolitan area, with the huge square-block flagship stores of Bullock's, The Broadway, May Co. and nearby, Robinson's, and suburban malls barely having launched. The store underwent a $1,000,000 remodel by Welton Becket, architect, and reopened in November 1953 as Ohrbach's-Downtown. Ohrbach's closed its branch and sold the building in 1959. The building still exists and consists of loft condominium (Shybary Grand Lofts, 312 W. Fifth St.) with retail on the ground floor. The success at this branch was short-lived. It first closed five floors as an economic move, and in 1959 closed the branch because of poor results.

On November 3, 1962, it opened its third L.A.-area store in the Gateway Cities, at La Mirada Shopping Center, measuring 100,000 square feet (9,300 m^{2}).

In 1964, Ohrbach's opened a 104,000-square-foot (9,700 m^{2}) store in the San Fernando Valley's Panorama City Shopping Center (the building is now occupied by the Valley Indoor Swap Meet. In 1965, the Miracle Mile store was relocated in the former Seibu Department Store at Wilshire and Fairfax Avenue. This is the current location of the Petersen Automotive Museum.

Ohrbach's was an anchor of the Los Cerritos Center in Cerritos, in the 1970s. In the mid-1970s, the company opened another store in the Glendale Galleria in Glendale, California. The architecture of the Cerritos and Glendale store featured an unusual tile façade to identify Ohrbach's in these new large malls.

Ohrbach's supplied clothing for the television soap operas The Edge Of Night, All My Children, Dark Shadows, The Doctors, the short-lived weekly drama Coronet Blue, comedies Mister Ed, I Love Lucy, The Donna Reed Show, and others.

Logo used from 1973-1985

=== Later history ===
In 1954, Ohrbach's moved from its Union Square location to West 34th Street between Fifth and Sixth Avenues across from the Empire State Building. The eleven-story building was formerly occupied by McCreery and Company Department Stores. In 1962, the Netherlands based Brenninkmeyer Company bought an interest in the firm and increased its ownership until Nathan Ohrbach retired in 1965 and it obtained complete control. In 1967, they opened their first suburban New Jersey store at The Bergen Mall.

Ohrbach's was one of five anchor stores located in downtown Newark, New Jersey during the last half of the 20th century. Following race rioting in July 1967, business declined at downtown stores, and conditions continued to worsen during the early 1970s. In 1973, Ohrbach's announced that it would close its store in Newark following the Christmas shopping season of that year. The store closed in January 1974 following a liquidation sale, and the remaining corporate offices located on the 5th and 6th floors of the Newark building relocated to space at the 34th Street store. The company's credit operations, also headquartered in the Newark building were moved to space in the firm's Bergen Mall location. At the time of Ohrbach's departure the other department stores operating in Newark stated they were still committed to downtown, but they began closing in 1976. By 1992, the last remaining firm, Macy's/Bamberger's, shuttered its downtown location.

== Closure and epilogue ==
Ohrbach's was acquired in 1962 by Netherlands-based C.&A. Brenninkmeyer Company which later established the holding company Amcena to oversee its American operations. 24 years later, in June 1986, Brenninkmeyer's Amcena acquired Howland-Steinbach from Supermarkets General Corp, and announced the end of the Ohrbach's chain including the shuttering of its flagship store on 34th Street in Manhattan and the sale of all six locations in Greater Los Angeles. The remaining five Ohrbach's stores in New York and New Jersey closed in January 1987 and reopened under the Steinbach banner two months later.

== Epilogue: Los Angeles area stores ==
Despite the announcement earlier in the year, some California locations operated at least into 1987 and were closed as follows:↔

Store	Location	Opened	Closed/Notes
Downtown Los Angeles	312 W. Fifth at Broadway	November 1953	Sold building and closed store 1958
Miracle Mile	6060 Wilshire Boulevard	1948	Closed December 28, 1986
La Mirada	La Mirada Mall	November 3, 1962	c.June 1974
Cerritos	Los Cerritos Center	1972	Closed December 28, 1986. Architects Gruen & Assoc.
Canoga Park	Topanga Plaza	c.1964	Closed December 28, 1986
Panorama City	Panorama City Shopping Center	1964	Sold in September 1986 to developer Gary Leff, leased for use as an indoor swap meet
Torrance	Del Amo Fashion Center	October 4, 1971	c.1987
Glendale	Glendale Galleria	mid-1970s	mid-1987
