= Super Bowl LVI =

2022 National Football League championship game

Los Angeles Rams (4) (NFC) (12–5)	Cincinnati Bengals (4) (AFC) (10–7)
23	20
Head coach: Sean McVay	Head coach: Zac Taylor
	1	2	3	4	Total
LAR	7	6	3	7	23
CIN	3	7	10	0	20
- Date: February 13, 2022
- Kickoff time: 3:35 p.m. PST (UTC-8)
- Stadium: SoFi Stadium; Inglewood, California
- MVP: Cooper Kupp, wide receiver
- Favorite: Rams by 3.5
- Referee: Ronald Torbert
- Attendance: 70,048

Ceremonies
- National anthem: Mickey Guyton
- Coin toss: Billie Jean King
- Halftime show: Dr. Dre, Snoop Dogg, Eminem, Mary J. Blige, and Kendrick Lamar, featuring 50 Cent and Anderson .Paak

TV in the United States
- Network: NBC; Telemundo; Peacock
- Announcers: Al Michaels (play-by-play); Cris Collinsworth (analyst); Michele Tafoya and Kathryn Tappen (sideline reporters); Terry McAulay (rules analyst); Carlos Mauricio Ramirez (play-by-play Spanish); Jorge Andres (analyst Spanish); Rolando Cantu (analyst Spanish); Ariana Figuera (sideline Spanish)
- Nielsen ratings: 36.9 (national); 36.7 (Los Angeles); 46.1 (Cincinnati); U.S. TV viewership: 112.3 million
- Cost of 30-second commercial: $6.5–7 million

Radio in the United States
- Network: Westwood One
- Announcers: Kevin Harlan (play-by-play); Kurt Warner (analyst); Laura Okmin and Mike Golic (sideline reporters); Gene Steratore (rules analyst)

Super Bowl LVI was an American football game played to determine the champion of the National Football League (NFL) for the 2021 season. The National Football Conference (NFC) champion Los Angeles Rams defeated the American Football Conference (AFC) champion Cincinnati Bengals 23–20. The game was played on February 13, 2022, at SoFi Stadium in Inglewood, California, the home stadium of the Rams, marking the second consecutive and second overall Super Bowl with a team playing and winning in its home stadium.

The Rams' victory was their second overall, first as a Los Angeles-based team, and first since winning 1999's Super Bowl XXXIV when they were based in St. Louis. Finishing with a 12–5 record, the Rams reached their fifth Super Bowl appearance after acquiring veteran quarterback Matthew Stafford, who had not won a playoff game in his previous 12 years with the Detroit Lions. The Bengals, who finished with a 10–7 record, were seeking their first Super Bowl title following several decades of losing seasons and playoff struggles. They won their first playoff game since 1990, ending the longest drought in the four major North American sports, en route to their third Super Bowl appearance and first since 1988's Super Bowl XXIII. Each team finished the regular season as their respective conference's 4-seed, making this the first Super Bowl without a top-3 seed since seeding was introduced in 1975.

The game had three lead changes and was mostly kept within a one-possession margin. Los Angeles led 13–10 at halftime, but the Bengals scored 10 straight points on their first two drives in the third quarter. Trailing 20–16 in the fourth, the Rams scored a touchdown to retake the lead with under two minutes remaining and stopped Cincinnati's final drive on downs. Wide receiver Cooper Kupp, who converted a fourth down on the Rams' final drive and scored the game-winning touchdown, was named Super Bowl MVP.

NBC's broadcast of Super Bowl LVI was the second-most watched in the game's history, marking a shift from several years of declining ratings. Seen by an average of 112.3 million total viewers on both NBC and its streaming platforms, the game's ratings were up 8% from the previous Super Bowl.

== Background ==
=== Host selection process ===
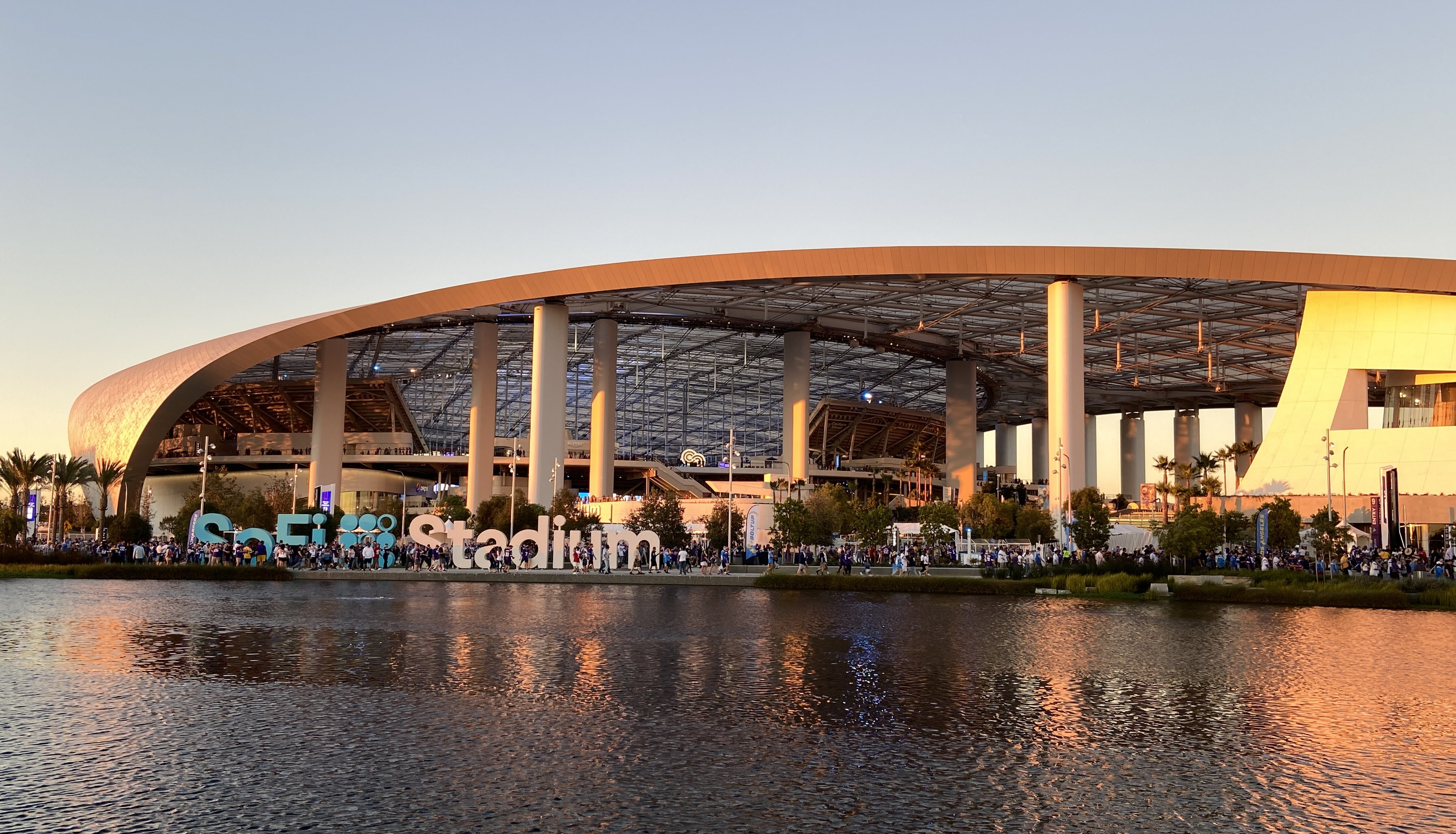
SoFi Stadium in November 2021

In contrast to most previous Super Bowls, no traditional bids were accepted for the hosting of Super Bowl LVI. The hosting duties for LIII, LIV, and LV were drawn from a pool of four candidates during the NFL owners' meeting on May 24, 2016:

- Atlanta – Mercedes-Benz Stadium
- Miami – Hard Rock Stadium
- Los Angeles – SoFi Stadium (which was under construction)
- Tampa – Raymond James Stadium

SoFi Stadium was not eligible for LIII as it would still be under construction at that time. In addition, it was not likely to secure LIV either because the league typically disallows stadiums from hosting the Super Bowl during its first season of operation. Atlanta received LIII, Miami received LIV, and Los Angeles was granted LV. Tampa was not selected.

About a year later, on May 18, 2017, developers announced that record rainfall in the Los Angeles area had postponed the completion of SoFi Stadium. It was originally scheduled to open in time for the 2019 season, but would now be delayed until 2020. As a result, at the NFL owners' meetings in Chicago on May 23, 2017, Super Bowl LV was pulled from Los Angeles, and reassigned to runner-up Tampa. At the same time, Los Angeles was awarded Super Bowl LVI, the next game available, and no other cities were considered. It would be the first Super Bowl in the greater Los Angeles area since XXVII was played at the Rose Bowl in Pasadena, and the eighth all-time.

The official logo for the game was unveiled on February 9, 2021, maintaining the standard design used since Super Bowl LI, but introducing sunset-themed designs reflecting the landscape of the host city/region (featuring in this case palm trees) within the traditional Roman numerals.

=== Impact of the COVID-19 pandemic ===
In early January 2022, it was reported that AT&T Stadium in Arlington, Texas, was being considered as an alternate site for the game as a contingency plan due to an increase of COVID-19 infections in California attributed to the Omicron variant. The stadium last hosted Super Bowl XLV in 2011. However, the NFL later confirmed on January 13 that the game would remain at SoFi Stadium, as the NFL saw an increased interest in the potential of the Rams playing a home Super Bowl game.

Attendance at the game was not limited, unlike Super Bowl LV in 2021, which was played with an audience at 37% of the capacity. Fans who went to the Super Bowl festivities prior to the game and those who attended the Super Bowl received a free KN95 mask. Per Los Angeles County public health orders, those attending the game were required to show proof of vaccination, a negative PCR test that was taken within 48 hours, or a negative antigen test that was taken within 24 hours. The proof of vaccination requirement had been implemented for large outdoor events in Los Angeles County since October 2021.

Those requesting media accreditation for the Super Bowl and playoffs were required to be fully vaccinated and have received at least one booster dose of vaccine.

== Teams ==
=== Los Angeles Rams ===
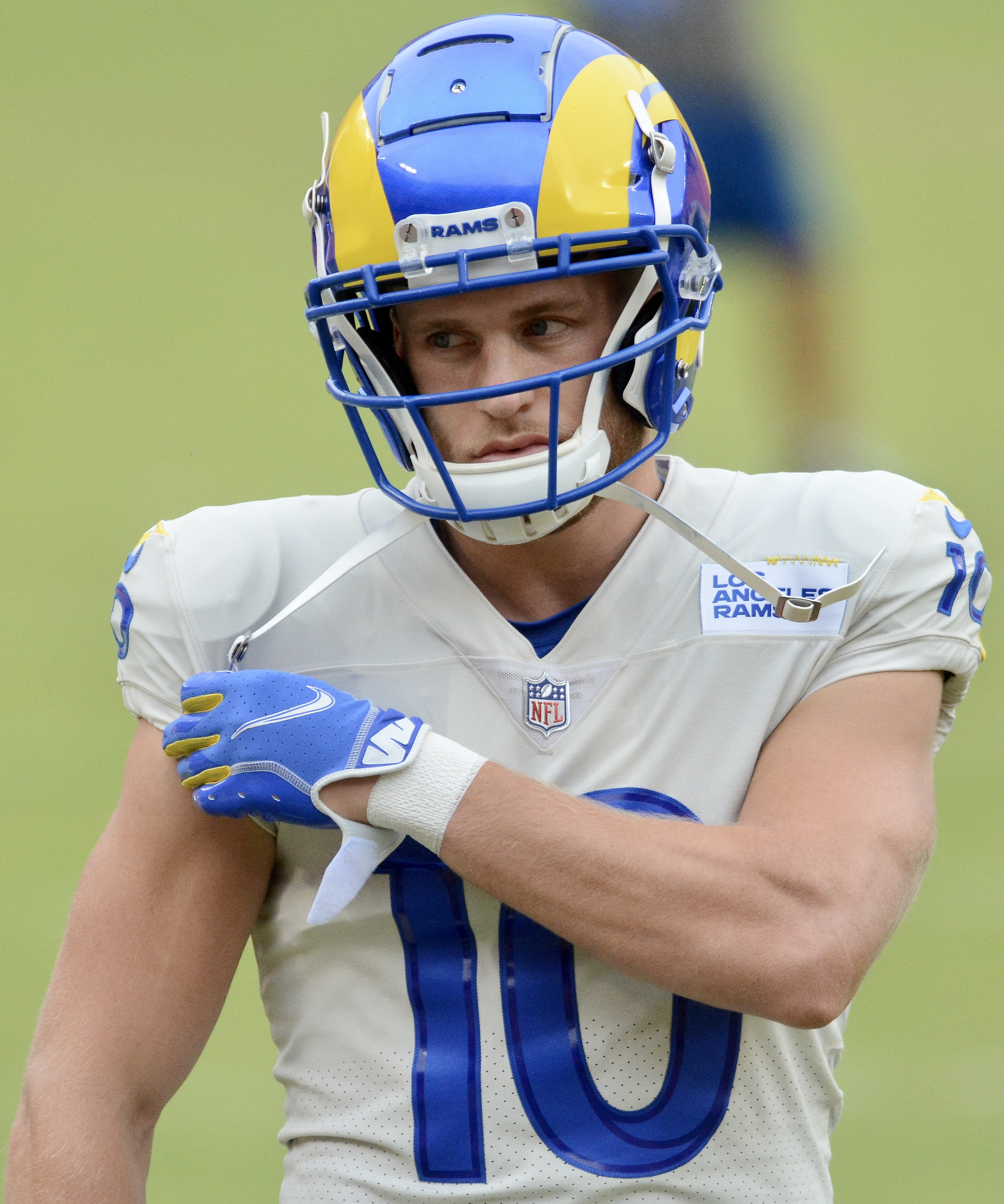
Cooper Kupp was the first player since 2005 to obtain the receiving triple crown

The Los Angeles Rams finished the 2021 season with a 12–5 record under fifth-year head coach Sean McVay. This was their fifth Super Bowl appearance, third as a Los Angeles–based team, and second under McVay. The franchise held a 1–3 Super Bowl record prior to the game, winning Super Bowl XXXIV in 1999 as the St. Louis Rams. They also won two pre-Super Bowl era championships in 1945 as the Cleveland Rams and 1951 during their first stint in Los Angeles.

After the Rams lost 2018's Super Bowl LIII, quarterback Jared Goff suffered a decline in production, which led to tension between Goff and McVay. Ahead of the 2021 season, the Rams traded Goff, two first-round picks, and a third-round pick to the Detroit Lions in exchange for 12-year veteran quarterback Matthew Stafford. Selected first overall by the Lions in the 2009 NFL draft, Stafford held an 0–3 playoff record, but ranked in the top 20 of major passing categories and was considered more suited to Los Angeles' offense. The team made another significant acquisition midway through the season when they traded a second- and third-round draft pick to the Denver Broncos for eight-time Pro Bowl linebacker Von Miller. A few weeks later, they signed free agent wide receiver Odell Beckham Jr., a three-time Pro Bowl selection, after he was released by the Cleveland Browns.

The Rams offense ranked ninth in yards (6,325) and tied with the Bengals for eighth in points scored (460). Stafford had career highs in touchdowns (41) and completion percentage (67.2), although he led the league in interceptions (17). He also set franchise records for single-season pass completions (404) and passing yards (4,886), while tying the passing touchdowns record. Wide receiver Cooper Kupp became the fourth NFL player and first since 2005 to obtain the receiving triple crown by leading the league in receptions (145), receiving yards (1,947), and receiving touchdowns (16). The Offensive Player of the Year, his receiving yards and receptions were both the second-most in a season. Kupp was joined by wide receiver Van Jefferson, who had 802 receiving yards and 6 touchdowns, and tight end Tyler Higbee, who had 560 receiving yards. Beckham added 537 yards and 5 touchdowns, helping fill the absence of the injured Robert Woods. The team's leading rusher at 845 yards was running back Sony Michel, who was acquired in a trade with the New England Patriots after Cam Akers missed most of the regular season with an Achilles tendon injury. Akers returned to the active roster ahead of the playoffs. Running back Darrell Henderson added 688 rushing yards until he was injured in Week 16, although he was able to return for the Super Bowl. The Rams' offensive line was led by 16-year veteran tackle Andrew Whitworth, who spent his first 11 seasons with the Bengals.

Defensively, the Rams ranked 17th in yards allowed (5,863) and 15th in points allowed (372). Named to the Pro Bowl were defensive tackle Aaron Donald (eighth selection), who led the team in sacks (12.5), and cornerback Jalen Ramsey (fifth selection), whose 4 interceptions were tied with safety Taylor Rapp for the most on the team. Linebacker Leonard Floyd complemented Donald with 9.5 sacks and Miller had 5 sacks after joining the team. The safety tandem of Rapp (64 solo tackles, 94 total) and Jordan Fuller (63 solo tackles, 113 total) had the most solo and combined tackles for the Rams, respectively. After an injury in the regular season finale forced Fuller to miss the playoffs, Los Angeles signed six-time Pro Bowl safety Eric Weddle out of retirement, who last played for the Rams in 2019. On special teams, placekicker Matt Gay earned Pro Bowl honors after leading the league in field goal percentage (94.1).

=== Cincinnati Bengals ===
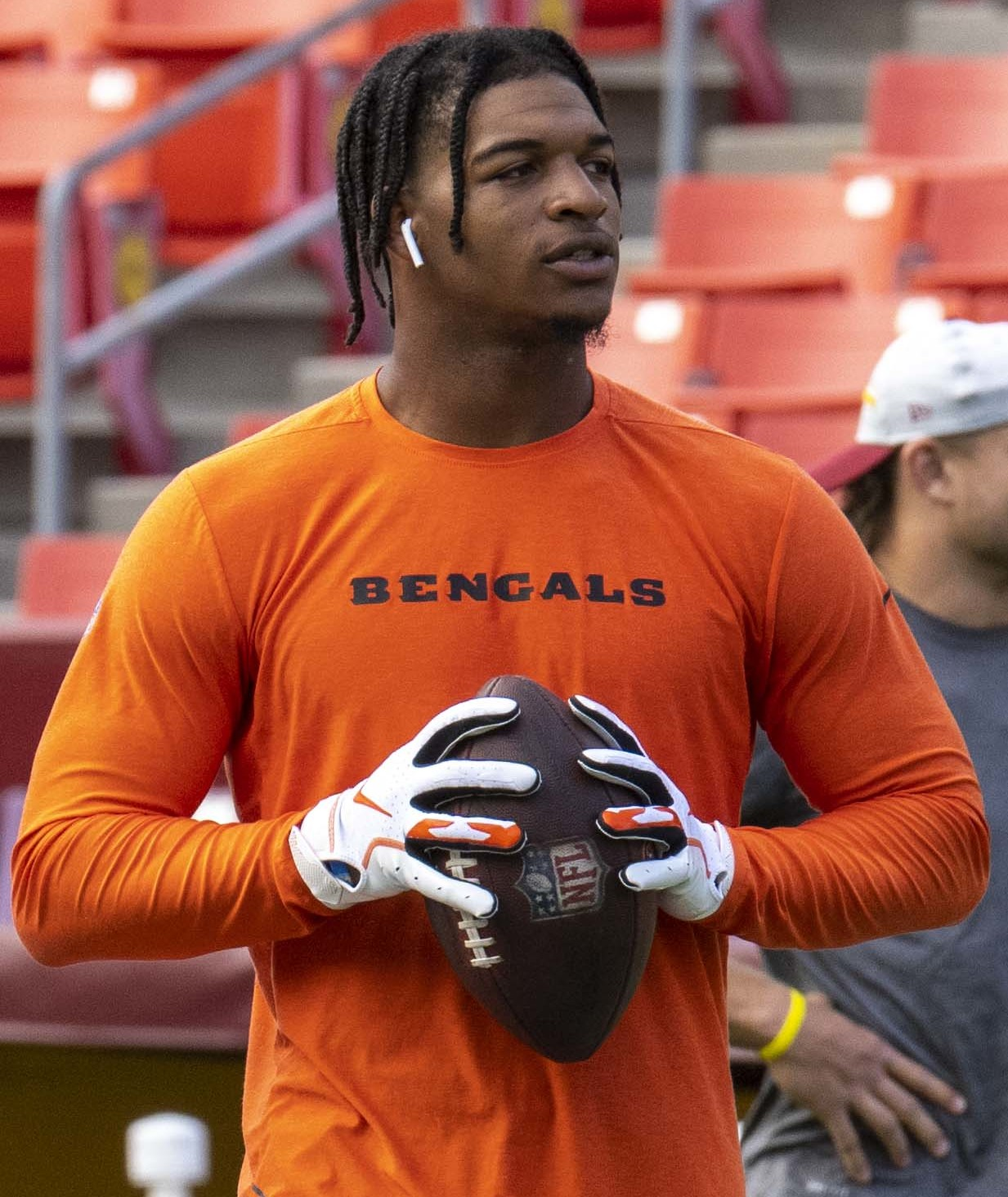
Ja'Marr Chase set the Super Bowl era record for rookie receiving yards

The Cincinnati Bengals finished the season with a 10–7 record under third-year head coach Zac Taylor. This was their third Super Bowl appearance, following 1981's Super Bowl XVI and 1988's Super Bowl XXIII. After losing both, the Bengals saw little success and had not won a playoff game since the 1990 season, which was the longest active drought in the four major North American sports.

Entering the 2021 season, the Bengals were considered unlikely to make the Super Bowl. They finished the previous three seasons at the bottom of the AFC North and had not made the playoffs since 2015. Cincinnati was also only two years removed from a league-worst 2–14 record during Taylor's first season. This finish granted the Bengals the first overall pick of the 2020 NFL draft, which they used to select Heisman Trophy-winning quarterback Joe Burrow. Burrow posted strong numbers as a rookie, but won only two games before his season was cut short by a knee injury. In the following year's draft, Cincinnati used the fifth overall pick on wide receiver Ja'Marr Chase, who was Burrow's teammate at LSU. The team also drafted placekicker Evan McPherson in the fifth round. On defense, the Bengals signed free agent defensive end Trey Hendrickson, who was coming off a breakout season with the New Orleans Saints. Defensive tackles Larry Ogunjobi and B. J. Hill were also acquired through free agency and a trade with the New York Giants, respectively.

The reunion of Burrow and Chase brought success to the Bengals, whose offense went from 29th in yards (5,116) and points scored (311) the previous season to 13th in yards (6,145) and eighth (tied with the Rams) in points scored (460). In his first full season, Burrow led the league in completion percentage (70.4) and yards per attempt (8.9), despite also leading the league in sacks taken (51). He set the season franchise records for passing yards (4,611) and touchdowns (34), along with the franchise record for single-game passing yards (525), and was named Comeback Player of the Year. Chase was fourth in receiving yards (1,455) and third in receiving touchdowns (13), both of which led the AFC. The Offensive Rookie of the Year, his receiving yards were the most for a rookie in the Super Bowl era and he set the rookie record for receiving yards in a game (266). Complementing Chase was wide receiver Tee Higgins, who obtained 1,091 receiving yards, making the Bengals one of only five teams with two 1,000 yard-receivers. Wide receiver Tyler Boyd further bolstered the receiving corps with 828 receiving yards and 5 touchdowns. Tight end C. J. Uzomah, who missed most of the previous year with a torn Achilles, had a breakout season by setting career highs in receiving yards (493) and touchdowns (5). Pro Bowl running back Joe Mixon was third in the NFL in rushing yards (1,205) and fourth in rushing touchdowns (13), while also recording 314 receiving yards and 3 receiving touchdowns.

Cincinnati's defense was 18th in yards allowed (5,964) and 17th in points allowed (376). Hendrickson ranked fifth in sacks (14), earning him his first Pro Bowl selection. Rounding out the defensive line, Hill had 5.5 sacks and 50 combined tackles, Ogunjobi had 7 sacks and 49 combined tackles, and defensive end Sam Hubbard had 7.5 sacks and 62 combined tackles. Linebacker Logan Wilson led the team in interceptions (4) and combined tackles (100), while safety Jessie Bates had the most solo tackles (62). McPherson, who was named to the 2021 PFWA All-Rookie Team, set the franchise records for the most 50-yard field goals converted in a season (9) and the longest field goal converted (58).

=== Playoffs ===
The Rams won their Wild Card matchup against the NFC West rival Arizona Cardinals in a 34–11 rout, marking the first career postseason win for Stafford. In the Divisional Round, the Rams took a 27–3 lead against the defending Super Bowl LV champion Tampa Bay Buccaneers, but committed a series of fumbles that led to the Buccaneers tying the game with 42 seconds remaining. Nevertheless, Stafford drove the Rams 63 yards off two passes to Kupp, which allowed Gay to kick the game-winning field goal as time expired. The NFC Championship Game pitted the Rams against the NFC West rival San Francisco 49ers, who swept them in the regular season and held a 6–0 record in games with quarterback Jimmy Garoppolo. Los Angeles trailed 17–7 entering the fourth quarter, but scored 13 consecutive points to take the lead with under two minutes remaining. The rally was marked by San Francisco committing several miscues, including 49ers safety Jaquiski Tartt dropping a potential interception. On the 49ers' final drive, Donald forced a pass from Garoppolo that was intercepted by linebacker Travin Howard to secure the 20–17 victory. Higbee suffered a knee injury during the game that forced him to miss the Super Bowl.

The Bengals defeated the Las Vegas Raiders 26–19 in the Wild Card Round for their first playoff victory since 1990, ending the longest drought in the four major North American sports. However, Ogunjobi suffered a foot injury that ruled him out for the remainder of the postseason. Their victory also came with controversy when a touchdown pass from Burrow to Boyd appeared to be whistled dead by an official before Boyd caught the ball. Cincinnati defeated the top-seeded Tennessee Titans in the Divisional Round 19–16 off a last-second field goal by McPherson, which was the franchise's first away playoff win. The victory occurred despite Burrow being sacked nine times, tying Warren Moon's 1993 postseason record and making him the most-sacked quarterback to win a playoff game. McPherson also became the first kicker to convert four field goals in separate rounds of the same postseason. In the AFC Championship Game against the two-time defending AFC champion Kansas City Chiefs, Cincinnati fell into a 21–3 deficit during the first half, but rallied to take a 24–21 lead in the fourth quarter. The game went into overtime, in which safety Vonn Bell intercepted Chiefs quarterback Patrick Mahomes on the first drive and McPherson converted a 31-yard field goal to send the Bengals to their first Super Bowl since 1988. Cincinnati's 18-point comeback was tied with the 2006 Indianapolis Colts for the largest in a conference championship.

=== Pre-game notes ===
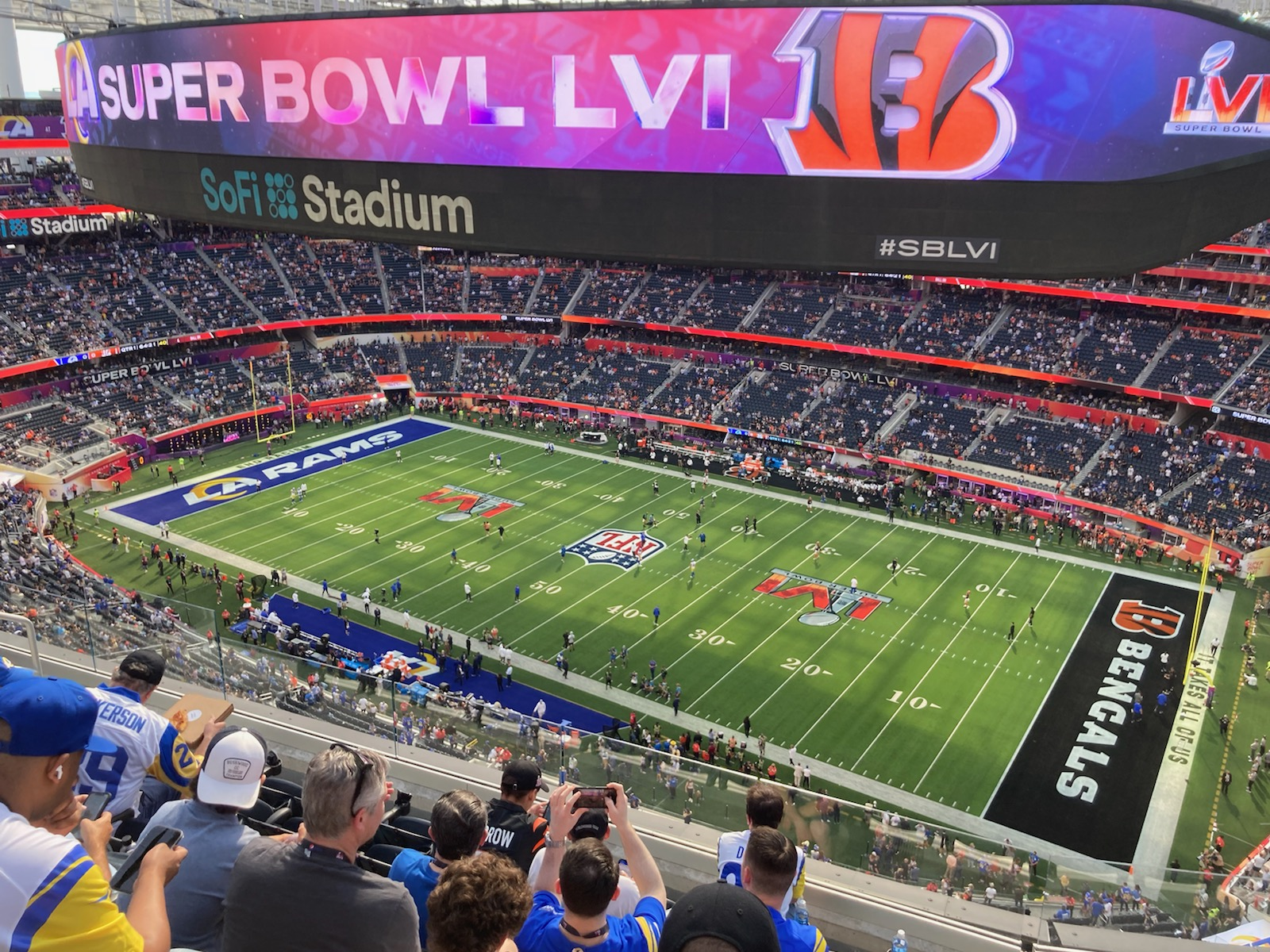
Pre-game warmups

This was the first Super Bowl to be played on the second Sunday in February, following the adoption of a 17-game schedule in 2021. From the 2003 to 2020 seasons, all Super Bowls were played on the first Sunday in February. This was the second warmest Super Bowl on record with a kickoff temperature of 82 °F (28 °C), behind Super Bowl VII. This made conditions for the pregame and the 1st half uncomfortable for everyone at SoFi, which many observers wrongly thought was a domed stadium with climate control based on how it appeared in long TV shots and broadcasts. However, the temperature outside dropped a great deal by the time the sunset and the 2nd half was played in comfortable conditions.

The Rams became the first NFL team to have their home stadium host both a conference championship game and the Super Bowl in the same season. However, the Rams were the designated visiting team as the home team alternates between the two conferences annually. Nevertheless, they still used their home locker room. The Bengals used the home locker room of the Los Angeles Chargers, who share the stadium with the Rams. This was the Rams' second Super Bowl in their home market, along with 1979's Super Bowl XIV, which was played at the Rose Bowl in Pasadena, California.

As the designated home team, the Bengals chose to wear their home black jerseys with white pants. The Rams selected newly unveiled alternate white jerseys with yellow pants.

The Bengals were the third team to make the Super Bowl after having the league's worst record two years earlier, following the 1981 San Francisco 49ers and the 2003 Carolina Panthers.

With McVay at age 36 and Taylor at age 38, Super Bowl LVI featured the youngest pair of head coaches in Super Bowl history and was the first to have both under 40. They were the two youngest head coaches in the league during the 2021 season. Taylor served on the Rams coaching staff under McVay from 2017 to 2018 and was hired as Cincinnati's head coach after Super Bowl LIII. Whitworth, at age 40, was the first player in a Super Bowl to be older than both head coaches.

This was the first Super Bowl in which both starting quarterbacks held career losing records. It was also the second in which both were first overall selections in the NFL draft, along with Super Bowl 50. Burrow reached the Super Bowl faster than any previous quarterback taken first overall by doing so in his second season.

== Entertainment ==
=== Pre-game ceremonies ===
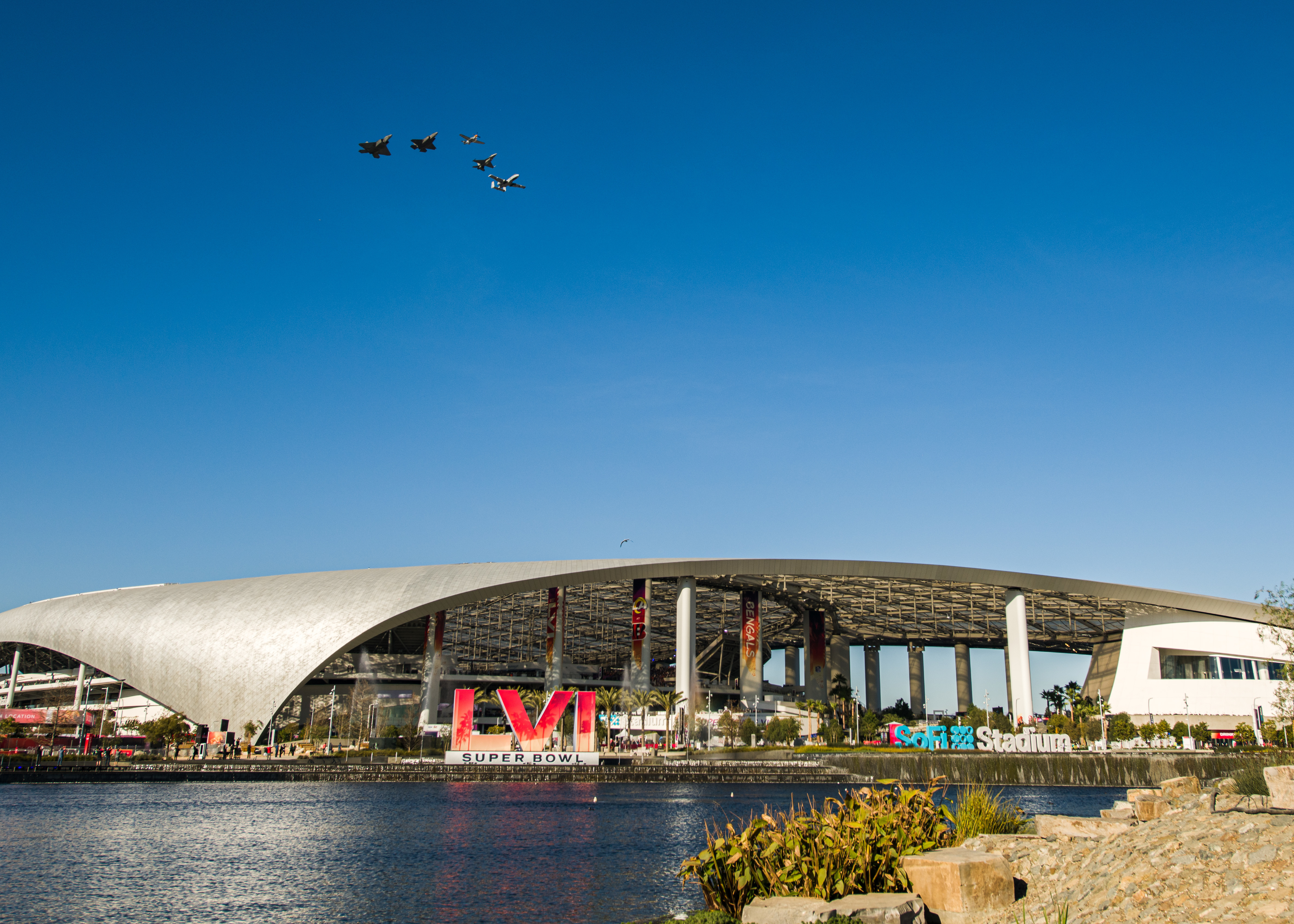
A formation of fighter and attack aircraft from past and present perform a flyover during the National Anthem at Super Bowl LVI, Feb. 13, 2022, over SoFi Stadium in Inglewood, Calif. The formation, led by a P-51 Mustang from the Air Force Heritage Flight Foundation, also featured each of Air Combat Command's single-ship jet demonstration teams: the F-35A Lightning II, F-22 Raptor, F-16 Viper, and A-10 Thunderbolt II. The formation was flown in celebration of the 75th Anniversary of the United States Air Force.

Country singer Mickey Guyton performed "The Star-Spangled Banner", making her the first black female country singer to perform the national anthem at the game. She was backed by several background singers and a pianist. Jhené Aiko, accompanied by harpist Gracie Sprout, performed "America the Beautiful". Sandra Mae Frank performed both songs in American Sign Language alongside Guyton and Aiko, with full coverage of the ASL performance available on the NBC Sports app. Mary Mary, accompanied by the Youth Orchestra of Los Angeles, performed "Lift Every Voice and Sing". Electronic music producer Zedd served as DJ during pre-game warmups. The flyover was conducted by a 5-plane formation by the USAF Air Combat Command demonstration teams with an A-10 Thunderbolt II, an F-16 Fighting Falcon, an F-22 Raptor, and an F-35 Lightning II as well as a P-51 Mustang representing the Air Force Heritage Flight. Former tennis player Billie Jean King then participated in the coin toss ceremony, honoring the 50th anniversary of Title IX, the federal civil rights law prohibiting sex discrimination in education programs. Dwayne Johnson introduced both teams using his persona as The Rock from the WWE.

=== Halftime show ===
This was the final halftime show to be sponsored by Pepsi. The halftime show was headlined by Dr. Dre, Snoop Dogg, Eminem, Mary J. Blige, and Kendrick Lamar, and it was widely praised. Surprise appearances were made by 50 Cent and Anderson .Paak. Deaf rappers Sean Forbes and Warren Snipe performed in American Sign Language during the show; this was the first time that American Sign Language was used during a halftime show at the Super Bowl. Described as a "legends of hip hop" performance, evoking nostalgia and localizing the globally broadcast game to Southern California with Dre's performance, it was the third show in partnership with Jay Z's Roc Nation. Eminem knelt after his set as a tribute to Colin Kaepernick. A rumor claimed that Eminem had been told by the NFL to stand up rather than kneel. However, an NFL spokesman told The New York Times that officials watched the taking the knee gesture "during rehearsals this week." A list in Rolling Stone by Rob Sheffield praised the performance as an "old-school West Coast rap history lesson" and ranked it as the fourth-best Super Bowl halftime show of all time, behind those by Beyoncé, U2, and Prince. He wrote that Kendrick Lamar deserved his own full-length performance which would eventually come to fruition in 2025 when he received his stand alone halftime show in Super Bowl LIX, which featured Samuel L. Jackson, SZA, Serena Williams and DJ Mustard.

== Broadcasting ==
=== United States ===
==== Television ====
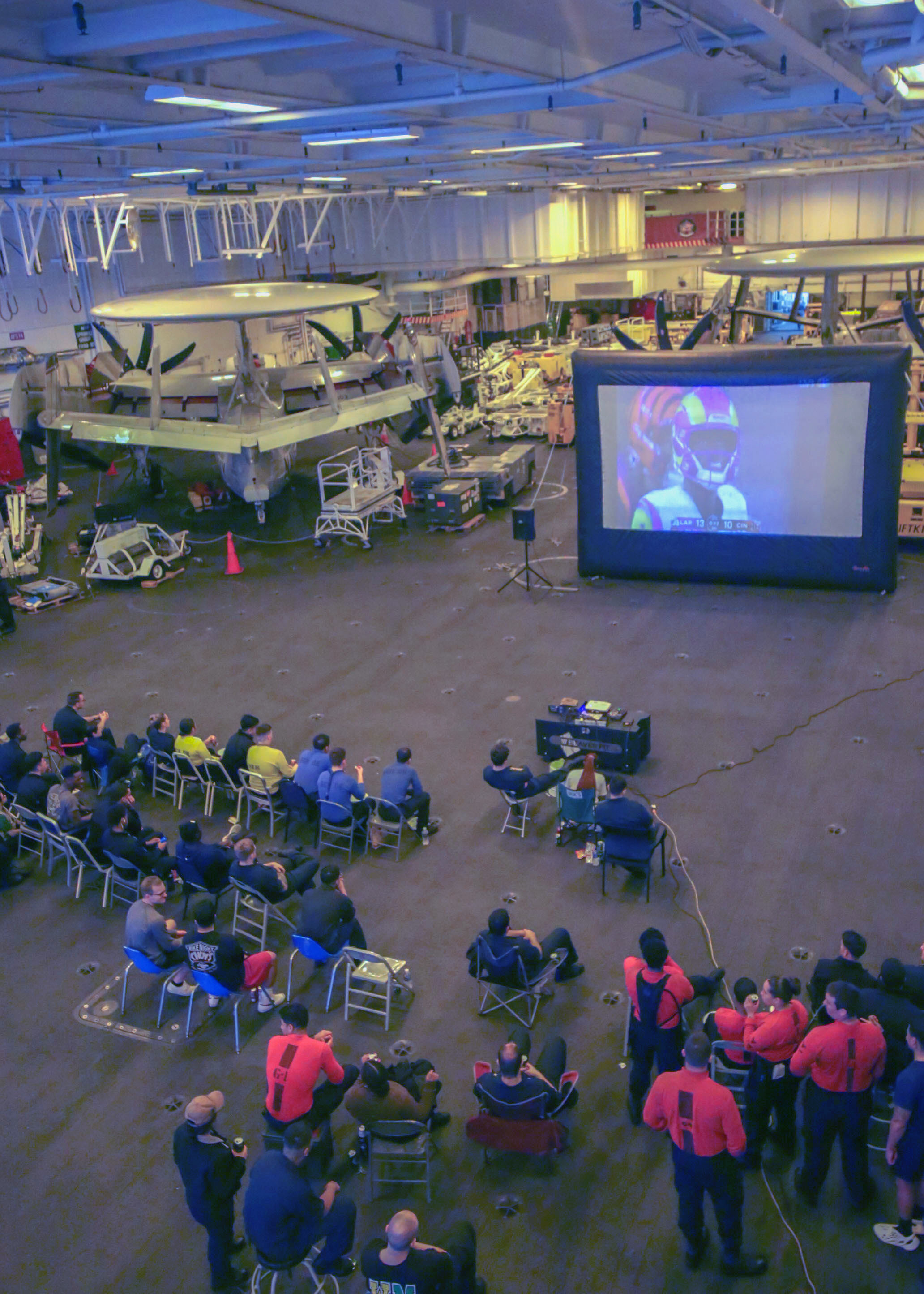
Sailors watch Super Bowl LVI in the hangar bay aboard USS Abraham Lincoln

Super Bowl LVI was televised by NBC, as part of a one-time modification to the annual cycle among the three main broadcast television partners of the NFL. Under the normal cycle the game would have been televised by CBS. However, in order to avoid counterprogramming the 2022 Winter Olympics in Beijing—which are televised exclusively by NBC—the NFL announced on March 13, 2019, that NBC had agreed to trade 2021's Super Bowl LV to CBS in exchange for Super Bowl LVI. This trade gave NBC the rights to both events and the network planned to maximize the advertising revenue from both events (as it did for Super Bowl LII prior to the 2018 Olympics). NBC subsequently announced in November 2021 that a block of primetime coverage for the Winter Olympics would air in its entirety after Super Bowl LVI in lieu of new entertainment programming.

This situation was also codified and eliminated the issue in the NFL's new 11-year media contracts taking effect in the 2023 season (which expands the Super Bowl rotation to four networks), where the cycle is aligned to give NBC or any other network that airs the Winter Olympics rights to the Super Bowl in the future Winter Olympic years of 2026, 2030, and 2034.

NBC's broadcast featured Al Michaels as the lead play-by-play broadcaster with Cris Collinsworth as the color commentator. Michele Tafoya reported from the Rams' sideline with Kathryn Tappen reporting from the Bengals’ sideline. This was Michaels' eleventh Super Bowl as a broadcaster, tying him with Pat Summerall for the most Super Bowls on television play-by-play. Collinsworth worked his fifth Super Bowl as an analyst, and his fourth since replacing John Madden as lead color commentator. This would be the final game at NBC for both Michaels and Tafoya; following the game, Tafoya announced that she would be leaving her position outright to pursue other interests outside of sports broadcasting, and Amazon Prime Video announced that Michaels would move to Thursday Night Football in the 2022 season while staying on NBC in an emeritus role. NBC employed additional goal line, sideline and end zone camera angles, and a new on-air graphics package. The broadcast featured a special introduction starring actress Halle Berry.

As Mike Tirico was the studio host for both the NFL and the Olympics, he traveled back from Beijing part-way through the Games' opening week, and briefly hosted its primetime coverage from NBC Sports' headquarters in Stamford, Connecticut (using a redecorated version of the Football Night in America set) before flying out to Los Angeles for Super Bowl weekend. Tirico then presented the Games' primetime coverage from NBC's lakeside set on the SoFi Stadium grounds, before returning to Stamford after the Super Bowl.

The game was broadcast in Spanish by NBC's sister network Telemundo, the first time that a dedicated Spanish-language telecast aired on broadcast television. Carlos Mauricio Ramirez handled play by play duties while Jorge Andres and Rolando Cantu handled in-booth, pre-game and post-game analysis. Ariana Figuera was the reporter on the field and Miguel Gurwitz led supporting pre-game, halftime and post-game coverage. Alongside NBC's presences in and around SoFi Stadium, Telemundo originated a pre-game show from Plaza México in Lynwood to showcase California's Latino community.

==== Advertising ====
NBC charged $6.5–$7 million for a 30-second commercial at Super Bowl LVI; CBS was paid $5.5 million the previous year for Super Bowl ads. Budweiser, Coca-Cola, Hyundai, and Pepsi were among the sponsors that returned after skipping the previous Super Bowl due to the economic impact of the COVID-19 pandemic. Universal Pictures, Paramount Pictures, HBO Max, Netflix, Disney, Sony Pictures, Warner Bros., Peacock, AMC+, and Amazon Prime Video promoted their upcoming films and series during the game. These included Jurassic World Dominion, Nope, Ambulance, The Lost City, Sonic the Hedgehog 2, Winning Time, The Adam Project, Doctor Strange in the Multiverse of Madness, Moon Knight, Uncharted, the DC Extended Universe's 2022 film slate, Bel-Air, Joe vs. Carole, and The Lord of the Rings: The Rings of Power.

The advertising during the game stood out for a high number of celebrity cameos and advertisements for futuristic technology, particularly for products like electric vehicles, virtual reality and cryptocurrency. There were many cryptocurrency-related ads drawing comparisons to dot-com commercials during Super Bowl XXXIV in 2000, leading some to refer to the game as the "Crypto Bowl". Critics echoed their reception of the halftime show performance said a number of ads prominently referenced media from the 1990s and 2000s, geared to evoke nostalgia among Generation X and Millennial audiences.

The Super Bowl Ad Meter survey conducted by USA Today was won by Rocket Mortgage for their ad featuring Anna Kendrick advertising a Barbie toy house while facing the grim realities of the modern housing and real estate market.

==== Streaming ====
Super Bowl LVI was streamed on NBCSports.com, the NBC Sports app, and Peacock Premium. This was the final game under the NFL's deal with Verizon (following the game NFL+ would be required to watch local games beginning in the 2022 season), as the game was also available on the NFL mobile app and the Yahoo! Sports mobile app for free. As part of its partnerships with the league, Verizon offered "5G Multi-View" features for attendees at SoFi Stadium.

==== Radio ====
The nationwide radio coverage was carried by Westwood One Sports. Kevin Harlan was the play-by-play commentator with analysis from Kurt Warner. Laura Okmin, and Mike Golic were the sideline reporters for each team, and Gene Steratore served as the rules analyst for the broadcast. Scott Graham served as pregame and postgame host, with Willie McGinest as his co-host.

==== Ratings and viewership ====
The broadcast of Super Bowl LVI drew the second-largest Super Bowl audience in history, tied with Super Bowl 50, reversing several years of decline with a total of 112.3 million viewers. About 101.1 million viewers watched Super Bowl LVI on linear television in the United States, representing an 8% increase from the previous year's game. The broadcast on NBC had 99.2 million viewers and 1.9 million viewed the Spanish-language Telemundo broadcast which was the first Spanish-language broadcast to carry the Super Bowl. According to NBC, it was the largest audience in U.S. Spanish-language history.

11.2 million viewers watched via streaming services (including co-viewing from connected devices), nearly doubling the record set by Super Bowl LV the year before which had 5.7 million viewers via streaming.

While viewership was up household ratings were nearly at an all-time low. The game's overall rating of 36.9 was the lowest since Super Bowl III (36.0) and the third-lowest Super Bowl of all time.

=== International ===
- ESPN International carried the game in many countries.
- In Canada, CTV and TSN televised this game in English and RDS in French. As with most past editions (except from 2017 to 2019), CTV was permitted to invoke simultaneous substitution over NBC's affiliate stations available on Canadian TV providers. It was also on TSN Radio.
- In the UK and Ireland, the game was televised on the free-to-air network BBC One and paid-subscription networks Sky Sports Main Event and NFL (as well as its sister channel Sky Showcase). It was carried on radio via BBC Radio 5 Live and Talksport.
- In Australia, the game was televised by the Seven Network as well as its sister channel 7mate and on-demand platform 7plus. The game was also broadcast on Melbourne Radio station 1116 SEN the game was commentated by Gerard Whateley and Ben Graham.
- In Turkey, the game was televised by S Sport.
- In Latin America, the game was televised on ESPN and on the streaming service Star+.
- In France, the game was televised on beIN Sports and on La Chaîne L'Équipe.
- In Germany, the game was broadcast free-to-air on ProSieben, ran and Joyn. The subscription video streaming service DAZN broadcasts the game on its platform.
- In Austria, the game was broadcast free-to-air on Puls 4 and on the German channels above who are all broadcast in Austria too.
- In Italy, Free-to-air channel Rai 1 and streaming platform DAZN televised the game.
- In Mexico, the game was televised on Televisa's Canal 5, TUDN and TV Azteca's Azteca 7.
- In Brazil, the game was televised on RedeTV!, ESPN and on the streaming service Star+.
- In Russia, Ukraine and the CIS, the game was televised on Viasat Sport.
- In Belgium and Portugal, the game was televised on paid-subscription channel Eleven Sports.
- In Spain, the game was broadcast by Movistar+ and televised on #Vamos por M+.
- In the Philippines, the game was televised on TapDMV.
- In the Balkans, the game was televised on Sport Klub.
- In Japan, the game was televised on DAZN and on Nippon TV.
- Indonesian streaming service Mola broadcast the game in Indonesia, Timor Leste, Malaysia and Singapore.
- In Denmark, the game was broadcast on TV3 Sport.
- In Poland, the game was televised on TVP Sport.
- In Puerto Rico, the game was carried live on Telemundo Puerto Rico in Spanish and on NBC Puerto Rico in English.

== Game summary ==
=== First half ===
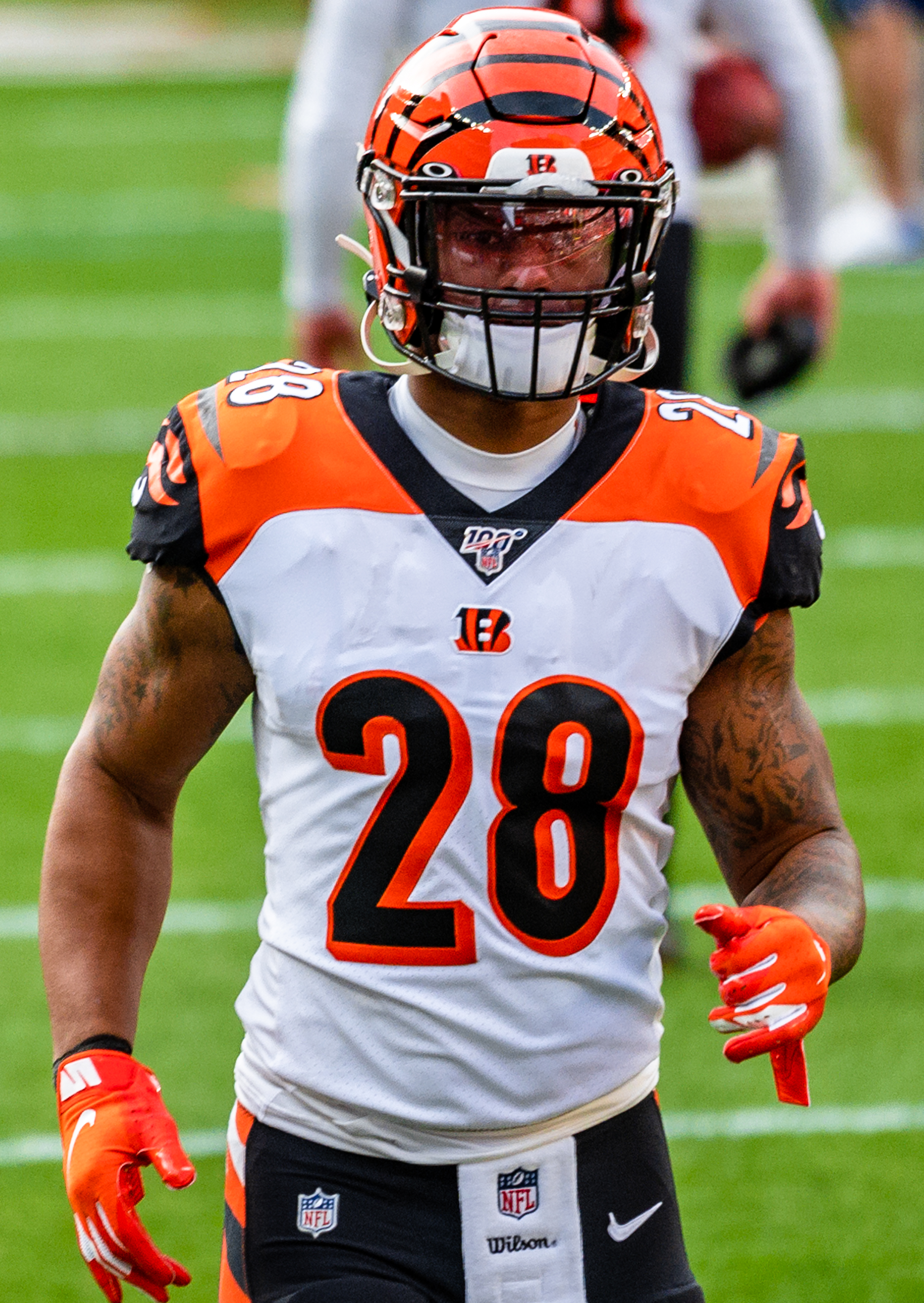
Running back Joe Mixon threw the Bengals' first touchdown pass

The Bengals won the coin toss and deferred to the second half; the Rams received the opening kickoff. After forcing Los Angeles to punt on their opening possession, Cincinnati received the ball at their own 42-yard line but could only gain 9 yards; instead of punting on 4th-and-1, they chose to go for it, but linebacker Ernest Jones knocked down quarterback Joe Burrow's pass to wide receiver Ja'Marr Chase, giving the ball to the Rams at midfield. A 3rd-and-4 was converted with a 20-yard completion from quarterback Matthew Stafford to wide receiver Cooper Kupp. Three plays later, the game's first score came by way of a 17-yard touchdown pass from Stafford to wide receiver Odell Beckham Jr. to take a 7–0 lead. Following an exchange of three-and-outs, Johnny Hekker's punt was returned 20 yards to the Cincinnati 30-yard-line by wide receiver Trent Taylor, where the Bengals started their possession. Running back Joe Mixon started the drive with a 13-yard run, then a 46-yard pass from Burrow to Chase advanced the ball to the Los Angeles 11-yard-line. However, three straight incompletions forced a 29-yard field goal by kicker Evan McPherson to cut Cincinnati's deficit to 7–3.

The Rams started the second quarter with Stafford's 35-yard pass to Beckham on 3rd-and-11, followed by a 25-yard reception by running back Darrell Henderson, who then picked up 5 yards before Stafford passed to Kupp for an 11-yard touchdown. On the extra point attempt, Hekker fumbled the snap, then threw an interception to linebacker Germaine Pratt, keeping the Los Angeles lead at 13–3. The ensuing kickoff was a touchback, and the Bengals advanced the ball 75 yards in 12 plays, with Burrow completing all five of his pass attempts for 38 yards while Mixon rushed 6 times for 26 yards. On the last play of the drive, Mixon took a pitch from Burrow and then passed to wide receiver Tee Higgins with a halfback pass for a 6-yard touchdown, cutting the Bengals' deficit to 13–10 with 5:47 left in the half. On the Rams' next drive, Stafford completed a 13-yard pass to wide receiver Van Jefferson, then later completed a 16-yard pass to tight end Brycen Hopkins to reach the Cincinnati 39-yard line. After a knee injury to Beckham, which sidelined him for the rest of the game, Stafford threw a deep pass intended for Jefferson that was intercepted in the end zone for a touchback by safety Jessie Bates at the two-minute warning. The Bengals were assessed an unsportsmanlike conduct penalty for excessive celebration, forcing them to start at their own 10-yard line. The teams then exchanged punts to end the half.

=== Second half ===
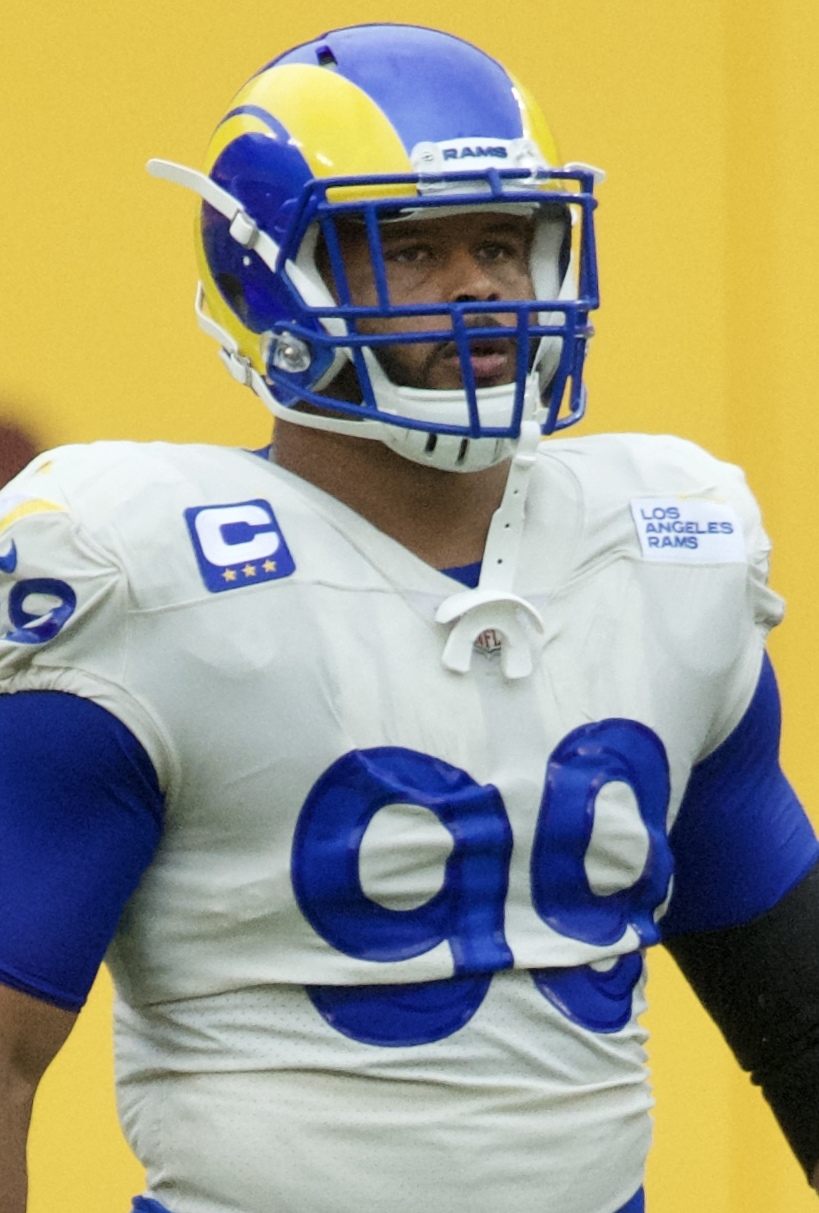
Defensive tackle Aaron Donald sealed the Rams' victory by forcing Cincinnati's final pass to go incomplete

Cincinnati immediately took their first lead of the game on the first play of the second half when Burrow threw a deep pass to Higgins near the left sideline, who was tangled up with cornerback Jalen Ramsey just before catching the pass and taking off for a 75-yard touchdown reception. Replays showed Higgins grabbing Ramsey's facemask before the catch, but no penalty was called and the touchdown stood, giving the Bengals a 17–13 lead. The Rams began to lose momentum on the first play of their opening possession when Stafford threw a pass that bounced off the hands of wide receiver Ben Skowronek and was intercepted at the Los Angeles 32-yard-line by cornerback Chidobe Awuzie. Despite being pushed back by a 9-yard sack by defensive tackle Aaron Donald, the Bengals were able to capitalize on the turnover with McPherson's 38-yard field goal, increasing their lead to 20–13. Shortly into Los Angeles' next drive, they faced a 3rd-and-8, which they converted for 15 yards with a pass from Stafford to Henderson. Overall, the drive covered 10 plays and 52 yards, almost all of which came from Stafford completing four of six passes before kicker Matt Gay's 41-yard field goal cut the score to 20–16 with 5:58 left in the third quarter. Going into the fourth quarter, the next seven possessions would result in punts.

Receiving the ball on their own 21-yard line with 6:13 left in the game, the Rams found themselves facing 4th-and-1 just four plays into the drive, but a 7-yard run by Kupp on an end-around converted it for a first down. They crossed midfield four plays later. Back-to-back passes from Stafford to Kupp for 30 yards advanced the ball to the Cincinnati 16-yard line. Following an 8-yard run by running back Cam Akers to set up 1st-and-goal for the Rams, the Cincinnati defense stood their ground, but a holding penalty on linebacker Logan Wilson on third down gave Los Angeles a first down. After a 4-yard touchdown reception by Kupp was nullified by offsetting penalties against both teams, cornerback Eli Apple was called for pass interference in the end zone, giving Los Angeles another new set of downs at the 1-yard line. Two plays later, Stafford finished the 15-play, 79-yard drive with a 1-yard touchdown pass to Kupp, giving the Rams a 23–20 lead with 1:25 left on the clock. With the hopes of their first Super Bowl title on the line, the Bengals got the ball on their own 25-yard-line with the chance to either win the game with a touchdown or force overtime with a field goal. Burrow quickly gained 26 yards with a 17-yard pass to Chase and a 9-yard pass to wide receiver Tyler Boyd. After an incomplete pass, Donald and nose tackle Greg Gaines tackled running back Samaje Perine for no gain, bringing up 4th-and-1 with 43 seconds left. After taking a timeout, the Bengals decided to pass the ball for a first down, but Donald wrapped Burrow up before he could make the throw. Burrow still managed to attempt a desperation pass to Perine as he was being taken down, but the pass hit the turf before reaching Perine and was incomplete, causing a turnover on downs and enabling Los Angeles to run out the rest of the clock with a quarterback kneel. Kupp was named the Super Bowl MVP, with eight receptions for 92 yards and two touchdowns, including four receptions and a touchdown (as well as one carry for seven yards) on the Rams' game-winning drive. Until Super Bowl LX, this was the most recent Super Bowl to not have a quarterback win Super Bowl MVP.

=== Box score ===
Los Angeles Rams vs. Cincinnati Bengals — Game summary

Quarter	1	2	3	4	Total
Rams (NFC)	7	6	3	7	23
Bengals (AFC)	3	7	10	0	20

at SoFi Stadium, Inglewood, California

- Date: February 13, 2022
- Game time: 3:34 p.m. PST
- Game weather: Clear, 82 °F (28 °C)
- Game attendance: 70,048
- Referee: Ronald Torbert
- TV announcers (NBC): Al Michaels, Cris Collinsworth, Michele Tafoya, and Kathryn Tappen
- Recap, Game Book

Scoring summary

Quarter	Time	Drive			Team	Scoring information	Score	
Quarter	Time	Plays	Yards	TOP	Team	Scoring information	LAR	CIN
1	6:22	6	50	3:35	LAR	Odell Beckham Jr. 17-yard touchdown reception from Matthew Stafford, Matt Gay kick good	7	0
1	0:28	6	59	1:41	CIN	29-yard field goal by Evan McPherson	7	3
2	12:51	6	75	2:37	LAR	Cooper Kupp 11-yard touchdown reception from Stafford, 2-point pass failed	13	3
2	5:47	12	75	7:04	CIN	Tee Higgins 6-yard touchdown reception from Joe Mixon, McPherson kick good	13	10
3	14:48	1	75	0:12	CIN	Higgins 75-yard touchdown reception from Joe Burrow, McPherson kick good	13	17
3	10:15	8	11	4:23	CIN	38-yard field goal by McPherson	13	20
3	5:58	10	52	4:17	LAR	41-yard field goal by Gay	16	20
4	1:25	15	79	4:48	LAR	Kupp 1-yard touchdown reception from Stafford, Gay kick good	23	20
"TOP" = time of possession. For other American football terms, see Glossary of American football.							23	20

== Final statistics ==
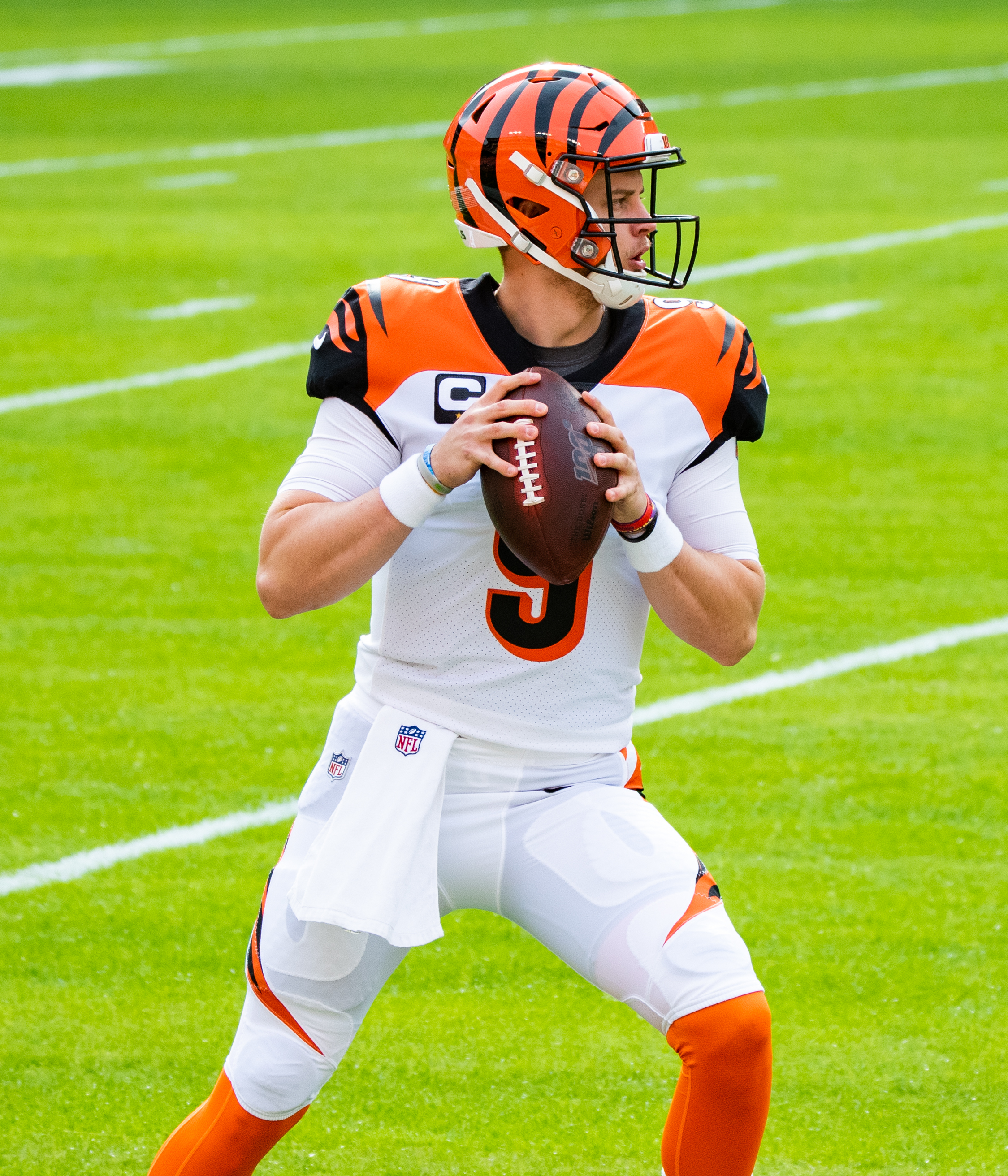
Joe Burrow tied the Super Bowl record for sacks taken

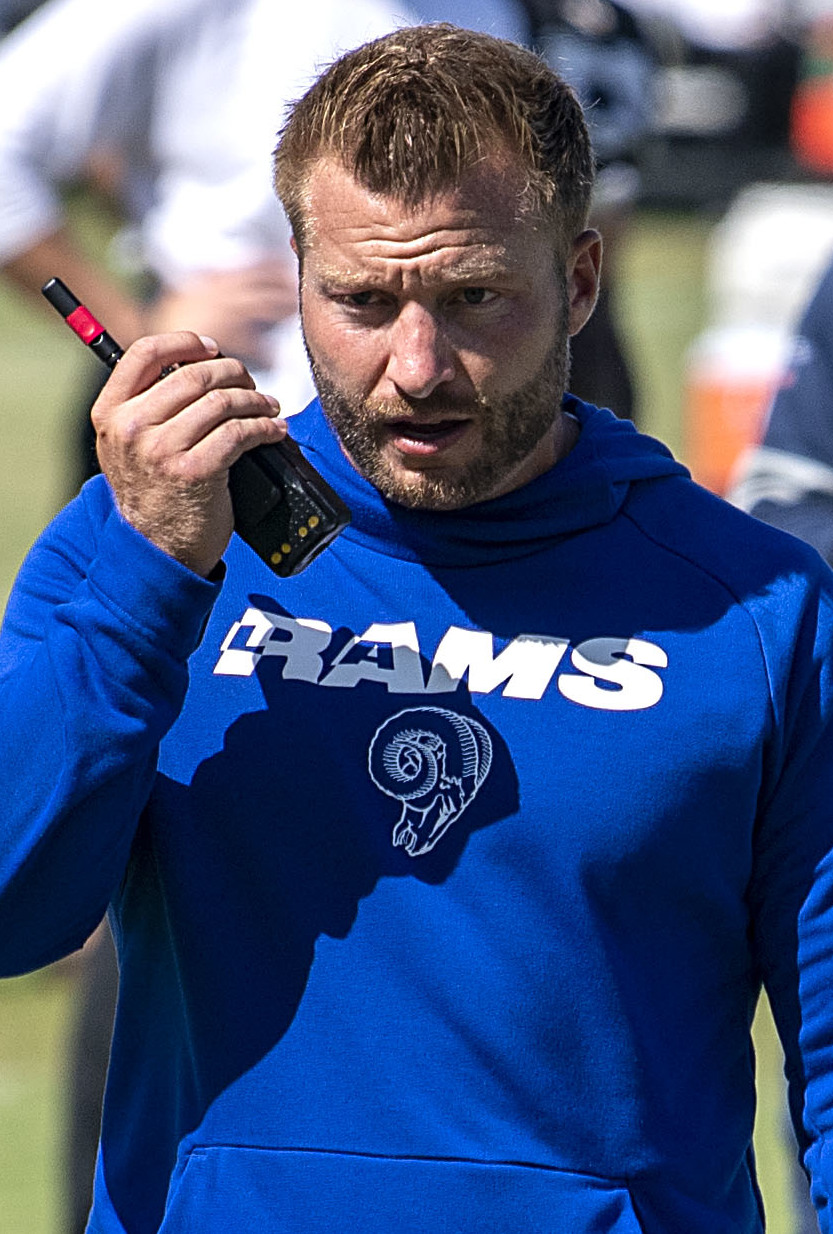
Sean McVay was the youngest head coach to win a Super Bowl

=== Statistical comparison ===
Team-to-team comparison
Statistic	Los Angeles Rams	Cincinnati Bengals
First downs	18	15
First downs rushing	2	5
First downs passing	14	10
First downs penalty	2	0
Third down efficiency	6–15	3–14
Fourth down efficiency	1–1	1–3
Total net yards	313	305
Net yards rushing	43	79
Rushing attempts	23	20
Yards per rush	1.9	4.0
Yards passing	270	226
Passing–completions/attempts	26–41	23–34
Times sacked–total yards	2–13	7–43
Interceptions thrown	2	0
Punt returns–total yards	4–25	2–28
Kickoff returns–total yards	1–17	0–0
Interceptions–total return yards	0–0	2–1
Punts–average yardage	6–43.5	6–43.3
Fumbles–lost	0–0	0–0
Penalties–yards	2–10	4–31
Time of possession	30:47	29:13
Turnovers	2	0

Records set (Unless noted as "NFL Championships", "Single Postseason" or "Pro Football History", all records refer only to Super Bowls)
Youngest head coach, winning team	36 years, 20 days	Sean McVay (Los Angeles)
Lowest yards per carry, winning team	1.9	Los Angeles
Most sacks in any quarter	5 (third quarter)	Los Angeles
Records tied
Most sacks, team	7	Los Angeles
Fastest second half touchdown	0:12	Tee Higgins (Cincinnati)
Most sacks, player, career	4.5	Von Miller (Los Angeles)

=== Individual statistics ===
Los Angeles Rams statistics
Rams passing
	C/ATT^{1}	Yds	TD	INT	Rating
Matthew Stafford	26/40	283	3	2	89.9
Cooper Kupp	0/1	0	0	0	39.6
Rams rushing
	Car^{2}	Yds	TD	Lg^{3}	Yds/Car
Cam Akers	13	21	0	8	1.6
Cooper Kupp	1	7	0	7	7.0
Darrell Henderson	4	7	0	5	1.8
Matthew Stafford	3	6	0	7	2.0
Sony Michel	2	2	0	3	1.0
Rams receiving
	Rec^{4}	Yds	TD	Lg^{3}	Target^{5}
Cooper Kupp	8	92	2	22	10
Brycen Hopkins	4	47	0	16	4
Van Jefferson	4	23	0	13	8
Darrell Henderson	3	43	0	25	5
Cam Akers	3	14	0	7	4
Odell Beckham Jr.	2	52	1	35	3
Ben Skowronek	2	12	0	7	5
Matthew Stafford	0	0	0	0	1

Cincinnati statistics
Bengals passing
	C/ATT^{1}	Yds	TD	INT	Rating
Joe Burrow	22/33	263	1	0	100.9
Joe Mixon	1/1	6	1	0	131.2
Bengals rushing
	Car^{2}	Yds	TD	Lg^{3}	Yds/Car
Joe Mixon	15	72	0	14	4.8
Ja'Marr Chase	1	4	0	4	4.0
Joe Burrow	2	3	0	4	1.5
Samaje Perine	2	0	0	0	0.0
Bengals receiving
	Rec^{4}	Yds	TD	Lg^{3}	Target^{5}
Ja'Marr Chase	5	89	0	46	8
Tyler Boyd	5	48	0	16	6
Joe Mixon	5	1	0	4	6
Tee Higgins	4	100	2	75	7
C. J. Uzomah	2	11	0	6	2
Mike Thomas	1	17	0	17	1
Chris Evans	1	3	0	3	2
Samaje Perine	0	0	0	0	1

^{1}Completions/attempts
^{2}Carries
^{3}Long gain
^{4}Receptions
^{5}Times targeted

== Starting lineups ==
Starting lineups for Super Bowl LVI
Los Angeles	Position		Cincinnati
Offense
Cooper Kupp	WR		Ja'Marr Chase
Kendall Blanton	TE		C. J. Uzomah
Andrew Whitworth	LT		Jonah Williams
David Edwards	LG		Quinton Spain
Brian Allen	C		Trey Hopkins
Austin Corbett	RG		Hakeem Adeniji
Rob Havenstein	RT		Isaiah Prince
Odell Beckham Jr.	WR		Tee Higgins
Van Jefferson	WR		Tyler Boyd
Matthew Stafford	QB		Joe Burrow
Cam Akers	RB		Joe Mixon
Defense
A'Shawn Robinson	LDE		Sam Hubbard
Greg Gaines	NT		D. J. Reader
Aaron Donald	RDE	DT	B. J. Hill
Leonard Floyd	LOLB	RDE	Trey Hendrickson
Ernest Jones	MLB	LB	Logan Wilson
Von Miller	ROLB	LB	Germaine Pratt
Jalen Ramsey	CB		Chidobe Awuzie
Darious Williams	CB		Eli Apple
David Long	CB	NCB	Mike Hilton
Eric Weddle	FS		Jessie Bates III
Nick Scott	SS		Vonn Bell

== Officials ==
Super Bowl LVI featured seven officials. Continuing a practice instituted the previous year an alternate official was assigned for each position of an official on the field and the replay official. The numbers in parentheses below indicate their uniform numbers.

- Referee: Ronald Torbert (62), first Super Bowl
- Umpire: Bryan Neale (92), first Super Bowl
- Down judge: Derick Bowers (74), second Super Bowl (XLIII)
- Line judge: Carl Johnson (101), third Super Bowl (XLII, LIV)
- Field judge: Rick Patterson (15), third Super Bowl (XXXVII, XXXIX, both as side judge)
- Side judge: Keith Washington (7), first Super Bowl
- Back judge: Scott Helverson (93), third Super Bowl (XLII, XLV)
- Replay official: Roddy Ames, first Super Bowl
- Replay assistant: Sean McKee
- Alternate officials:
  - Referee: Bill Vinovich (52)
  - Umpire: Paul King (121)
  - Down judge: Ed Camp (134)
  - Line judge: Greg Bradley (98)
  - Field judge: Aaron Santi (50)
  - Side judge: Jonah Monroe (120)
  - Back judge: Greg Steed (12)
  - Replay official: Mark Butterworth

== Aftermath ==
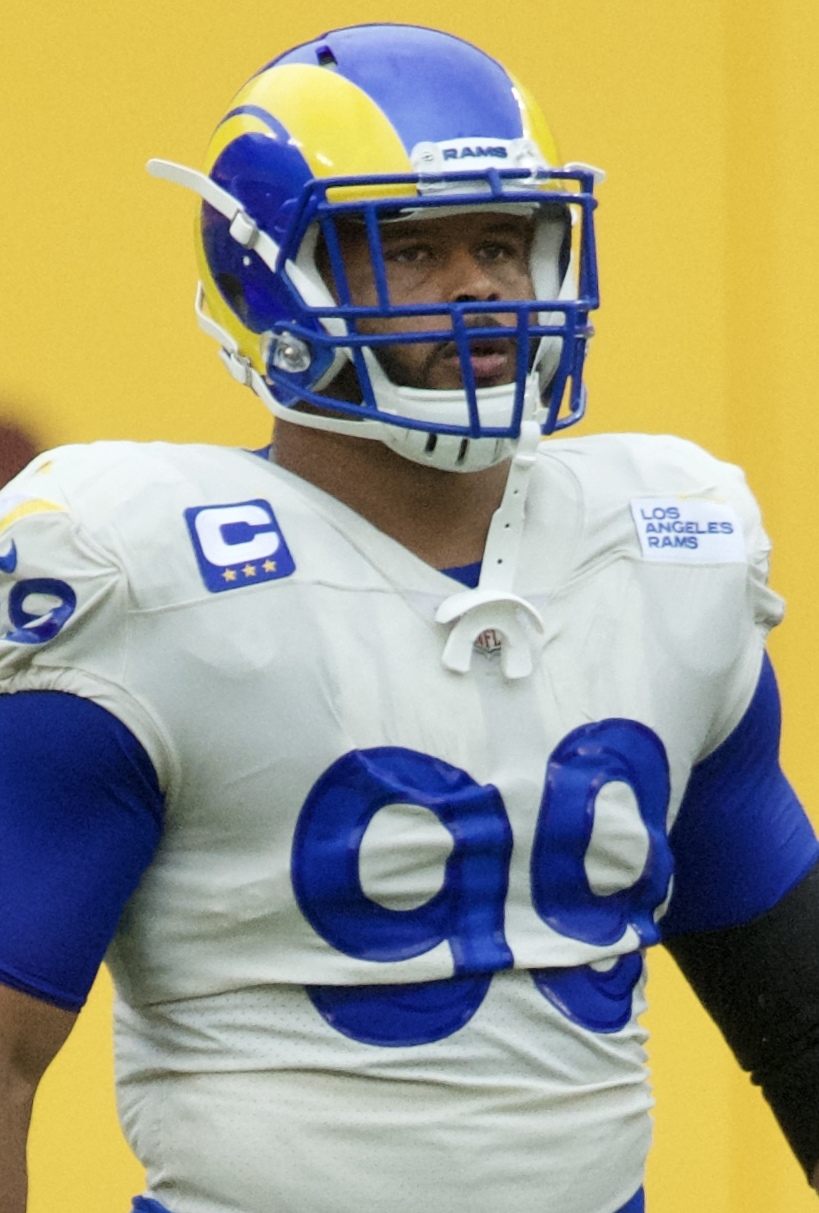
Aaron Donald played just two more seasons after winning Super Bowl LVI, retiring at age 32.

The 2022 Rams finished 5–12, setting the records for the most losses, lowest winning percentage (.294), and longest losing streak (six games) for a defending Super Bowl champion since the 1999 Denver Broncos. They were also the first defending Super Bowl champion to miss the playoffs since the 2016 Denver Broncos and first to have a losing record since the 2003 Tampa Bay Buccaneers. The Rams rebounded the next season going 10–7 and making the playoffs for the fifth time in seven seasons in the Sean McVay era. Aaron Donald, who told former player and NBC analyst Rodney Harrison that he would retire if the Rams won Super Bowl LVI, eventually called it a career after the Rams lost to former Rams' quarterback Jared Goff and the Detroit Lions in the Wild Card game; although he did come out retirement three years later in 2026.

The 2022 Bengals tied their franchise-best 12–4 record (Note: Cincinnati's Week 17 game against Buffalo Bills was ruled a no contest after Bills safety Damar Hamlin suffered cardiac arrest and the remainder of the game was canceled.) and clinched the franchise's first consecutive division title. They won a playoff game in consecutive seasons, another franchise first, before being defeated by the eventual Super Bowl LVII champion Kansas City Chiefs in the AFC Championship Game. The Super Bowl LVI appearance and the subsequent AFC Championship Game the following season would be the high point for the Cincinnati franchise, as they have not made the playoffs since.
