= Eastland Center (California) =

- Location: West Covina, California, United States
- Coordinates: 34.07340°N 117.88588°W
- Address: 2753 E Eastland Center Dr.
- Opened: 1957
- Developer: May Centers, Inc.
- Manager: Pine Tree, LLC
- Num. of anchor tenants: 11
- Floor area: 910,709 sq ft (84,607.6 m^{2})
- Floors: 2
- Website: pinetree.com/eastland-center

Eastland Center (formerly Westfield Shoppingtown Eastland, Westfield Eastland and Eastland Shopping Center) is a shopping center in West Covina, California, managed by Pine Tree, LLC.

Westfield America, Inc., a precursor to Westfield Group, acquired the shopping center in 1998 and renamed it "Westfield Shoppingtown Eastland", dropping the "Shoppingtown" name in June 2005.

The department store-anchored regional shopping mall was converted to a power center as the nearby Plaza West Covina became the dominant area center. It was once anchored by a five-story May Company department store, where the Target now stands. The power center is two levels, with parking for the lower level on the south side of the center and parking for the upper level on the north side. Corridors connect both the upper and lower levels.

== History ==
Eastland Center was designed by architect Albert C. Martin and opened in 1957 as an outdoor mall along the San Bernardino Freeway (U.S. Route 60 and U.S. Route 99, later Interstate 10). It opened with a five-level May Company on the east end of the mall, and two-level W.T. Grant on the west end. It had a regular mall on the upper level, and a strip center on the lower level facing the freeway. The Paul Cummins Huddle restaurant chain had a location in the parking area where a TGIFridays now stands. An outparcel structure, known as the Avenue Shops, was located in the northwest parking area and included a Hiram's Supermarket. Another outparcel, in the lower (southeast) parking lot, housed a branch of Wallichs Music City.

The mall was enclosed and expanded in 1979 with a Robert's department store at the center of the mall. W.T. Grant had closed in 1976 and was converted into shops on the upper level. The Avenue Shops outparcel was renamed the Street Shops. It then housed a Lucky Market (now Albertsons), Longs Drugs, the Five Lanterns Chinese cuisine restaurant and small shops.

In the early 1980s, Mervyn's department store was added on to the west end of the mall, next to the old W.T. Grant location. This brought out the first of the big box locations on the lower level, with Office Depot moving into the W.T. Grant lower level (moved to another part in 2012, later Pottery Barn Outlet, now new Burlington Coat Factory store), and Marshalls taking lease to the center shops. The early-1980s also saw one of Southern California's few ShowBiz Pizza Places opening at Eastland, known as PJ Pizzazz. After PJ closed, it became the Safari Bar nightclub. It is currently BJ's Restaurant & Brewhouse. The May Company garage was converted into Chili's. Later Ross Dress for Less and Famous Footwear finished off the lower level. In the mid-1980s, Sportmart opened up in the basement level of the May Company store.

In 1993, May Company closed its Eastland Center location and moved to the nearby West Covina Fashion Plaza, continuing operations as the newly formed Robinsons-May chain. The location stood empty for years, with the Sportmart continuing to operate in its former basement. In 1997, the upper level of the mall was permanently closed. The Sportmart was closed and ex-May location was torn down, except for the basement level, and the upper level became Target. The Disney family play center Club Disney was built in the space just east of where The May Co was located, opening on February 15, 1998, only to be closed less than two years later to be replaced by Circuit City. This location included a PetSmart, Dollar Tree, The Habit and Pacific Fish Grill. Mervyn's continued, and other national chains, such as Levitz Furniture (replacing Loehmann's), Bed Bath & Beyond (later original Hobby Lobby, currently vacant), and Babies "R" Us (now Ashley HomeStore) took up spots in the upper level. Local sporting goods Chick's (now renamed to Dick's Sporting Goods) is also on the second level. Burlington Coat Factory took up shop in the former basement of the May Company.

In November 2012, West Covina's first Walmart opened at the Eastland Center at 120,000 sq ft, replacing Mervyn's and Levitz which closed in 2009 as a result of the chains' bankruptcies. In 2021, Jollibee opened a new restaurant in that shopping center right across Barranca Avenue from its USA headquarters. On February 26, 2024, it was announced that the Walmart location would be closing and the store closed on March 29, 2024. A year later, Burlington Coat Factory moved out of its original space formerly May Company into another new tenant space, formerly the original Office Depot store and later Pottery Barn Outlet store. The former original Burlington Coat Factory space underneath Target is now subdivided into a new HomeGoods and newly relocated Hobby Lobby store, both opened in July 2026.
