= Honer Plaza =

Shopping center in Santa Ana, California, United States

Coordinates: 33.7393676°N 117.9059869°W

Honer Plaza, now the Bristol Marketplace, at 17th and Bristol streets in northwestern Santa Ana, California, was one of the first shopping centers in Orange County, California and one of the busiest in the county in its early days. Plans were announced for its construction in 1953 and it opened in 1958, starting with a 40,000-square-foot (3,700 m^{2}) Ralphs supermarket. Other anchor tenants over the 1950s-1980s included Montgomery Ward (which opened on August 11, 1960 and closed along with the entire chain due to bankruptcy in early 2001), Long Beach-based Robert's department store, Nahas department store, and J. J. Newberry. By the 1980s, the center was outdated in design — two rows of stores with a small pedestrian mall in the center, surrounded by acres of parking — and had lost business to more modern malls including Fashion Square/MainPlace and The City Shopping Center in Orange.

The site continues — without the pedestrian walkway lined with shops, thus effectively now a large strip mall — called Bristol Marketplace, anchored by Target (formerly HomeBase), Smart and Final Extra!, Northgate Market, Furniture Ave. (formerly Montgomery Ward, later Kohl's), and Big 5 Sporting Goods.
