= La Mirada Mall =

Former regional shopping center in La Mirada, California

Coordinates: 33.8983°N 118.0107°W

La Mirada Mall was a 72-acre (29 ha) regional shopping mall at the southeast corner of La Mirada Boulevard (originally named Luitwieler Avenue) and Rosecrans Avenue in La Mirada, California, United States, in southeast Los Angeles County, in a region known as the Gateway Cities. It is now the site of the La Mirada Theater Center, a strip mall.

== History ==
Ohrbach's opened a freestanding store here, its third in the Los Angeles area after Miracle Mile and Downtown L.A., and the first one in a suburb, on November 3, 1962, measuring 100,000 square feet (9,300 m^{2}).

In the early 1970s, Canadian developer Mark Tanz invested about $7 million to turn a loosely arranged, growing collection of stores into an enclosed mall next to a renovated outdoor plaza with fountains and trees. Over the years, stores that came and went included J.J. Newberry, Woolco, Ohrbach's, Barker Bros., Lucky Stores, Market Basket, the La Mirada Theatre (Pacific Theaters)(cinema), and Robert's Department Store. The former open-air nearly doubled in size in its transition to a fully-enclosed mall.

In the early 1980s, failing to create a unique profile among the dozen or so malls in the Gateway Cities area, the mall shifted to profiling itself as a "discount mall" with lower rents and stores that offered discounted, but name-brand, merchandise. Ohrbach's and Woolco left the mall.

In 1983, Toys "R" Us opened in the space that Woolco vacated at 15300 La Mirada Boulevard.

By early 1988, the decision had been made to demolish the mall and reduce its size. By 1990, demolition began on the old mall. The Toys "R" Us at the south end (#15300) was demolished in 1991 and is now the site of a housing development; the toy retailer later reopened in the old Roberts space, now UFC Gym. The outbuildings of the original mall's north side were renovated and these are now the main strip center anchored by an Albertsons supermarket, CVS Pharmacy (originally Sav-On Drugs), AMC Theatres and the La Mirada Theatre for the Performing Arts.
