= Indio Fashion Mall =

Shopping development in California

Indio Fashion Mall was a shopping mall in Indio, California, currently the site of the Indio Grand Marketplace.

Indio Fashion Mall opened on February 24, 1975. A 60,000-square-foot (5,600 m^{2}) Harris Company department store (later became Harris Gottschalks in 1999) and a Sears anchored the mall which had 40 other mall shops. The mall had 215,000 square feet (20,000 m^{2}) of retail space on a 17-acre (6.9 ha) parcel.

== Decline ==
The Sears store closed in 2004 (relocated to Westfield Palm Desert mall) and the Harris-Gottschalks in 2009.

By 2017, 70% of the storefronts in the mall were empty. On February 28, 2018, Los Angeles-based developer Haagen Company purchased the mall and its lot with the intention of eventual redevelopment.

== Current status ==
The building is now called Indio Grand Marketplace and is an indoor swap meet, consisting of lower-end independent retailers and food outlets.

== Redevelopment plans ==
The owner has plans to demolish the existing mall building and build a mixed-use development to cover the lot as well as an additional adjacent 20-acre parcel. It is to house retailers, casual dining and entertainment; up to 400 new residential units; and a hotel.".

By December 2025, the mall was described as defunct, with only one tenant remaining; the owner planned to relocate the final tenant before demolishing the interior mall structure, while retaining the former Gottschalks and Sears buildings for potential reuse.

By August 2026, Phase 1 of the mall's redevelopment was already under construction along Highway 111.
