= Roberts Department Store =

Defunct department store chain in Southern California

Robert's
- Company type: Defunct department store chain
- Industry: Retail
- Founded: 1950
- Founder: Morris Burman
- Defunct: 1994
- Headquarters: Long Beach, California, United States
- Number of locations: Multiple (e.g., Long Beach, Bellflower, Burbank, and others)
- Area served: Southern California
- Products: General merchandise

Robert's was a department store based in Long Beach, California.

The chain began when Morris Burman opened the first store in East Los Angeles. In 1950, Burman bought an existing store in North Long Beach at 5350 Long Beach Boulevard, and opened it as the Jones Department Store. In 1951, they opened Robert's at 16630 Bellflower Boulevard in Bellflower.

== Locations ==
The company had branches in the following areas:

- Bellflower, 16630 Bellflower Boulevard
- Bixby Knolls, Long Beach, 4450 Atlantic Avenue - opened December 1967, 52,000 sq. ft., 4450 Atlantic Avenue, closed in 1994, empty for 15 years, razed only in 2009 to make way for a new Marshalls. The loss of the store was long symbolic of the decline of Bixby Knolls as a retail center
- Bellflower, 16630 Bellflower Boulevard
- Burbank (Burcal), 240 North Golden Mall
- East Los Angeles, 4702/4771 Whittier Boulevard (now Fallas Paredes)
- El Centro, 1601 West Main Street at Imperial Avenue, El Centro Valley Plaza
- La Mirada Mall, 15000 La Mirada Boulevard (CR N8) at Rosecrans Avenue, now a strip mall. The Roberts space is now a UFC gym
- Pico Rivera Shopping Center, Whittier Boulevard at Rosemead Boulevard (SR 19)
- Pomona, 1500 East Holt Avenue, Pomona Valley Center, later Indian Hill Village, now Village@Indian Hill strip mall. Opened September 1970.
- Santa Ana, Honer Plaza
- Santa Fe Springs, 11528 Telegraph Road, Santa Fe Springs Shopping Center
- West Covina, Eastland Center
