= Northridge Fashion Center =

American shopping mall in California

- Northridge Fashion Center, 2026
- Location: Northridge, Los Angeles, California, U.S.
- Coordinates: 34°14′21″N 118°33′21″W
- Opened: 1971; 55 years ago
- Developer: J. David Gladstone
- Manager: GGP
- Owner: GGP
- Num. of stores: 184
- Num. of anchor tenants: 5
- Floor area: 1,407,532 sq ft (130,000 m^{2})
- Floors: 2 (3 in main Macy's and former Sears, 4 in JCPenney)
- Website: northridgefashioncenter.com

Northridge Fashion Center is a large shopping mall located in Northridge, Los Angeles, California. It opened in 1971. It was severely damaged during the Northridge earthquake in 1994, but renovated extensively in 1995, 1998, and 2003. The mall features J. C. Penney, Macy's, and Macy's Furniture Gallery, Dick's Sporting Goods, in addition to an AMC Theatres.

== History ==
The mall’s original anchors were JCPenney, Sears, Bullock's, and The Broadway.

The first store to open at the mall was a Bullock's department store, in September 1971. The Broadway followed in October, and Sears in November; after the rest of the mall opened in 1971, J. C. Penney was added as a fourth anchor in 1972. An expansion was announced in 1985, comprising J. W. Robinson's and May Company California. Both stores were the anchors to two new wings added in 1988. When those chains merged in 1993, they both operated as Robinsons-May.

In January 1994, the mall was damaged by the Northridge earthquake. The earthquake severely damaged several parking structures, caused damage to the interior mall, and all six anchor stores, including the Bullock's store, which was condemned soon afterward. Although The Broadway and Sears reopened in late 1994, renovation was further delayed through mid-1995. By June 1995, J. C. Penney was gutted and rebuilt. Bullock's was completely demolished and rebuilt from the ground up as a result of the earthquake.

Federated Department Stores, then-owners of the Bullock's and Broadway chains, converted the Bullock's to Macy's in 1996 and closed the Broadway, although it was planned to become a Bloomingdale's. A year later, Robinsons-May consolidated its two stores into the store at the southwest corner of the mall. The Robinsons-May at the northwest end was demolished for a movie theater, while the former Broadway store was subdivided for smaller mall shops. General Growth Properties acquired the mall and began construction on the outdoor promenade that replaced the former Broadway. It opened in 1999 with Borders Books & Music and several restaurants. When Macy's acquired Robinsons-May in 2006, the Robinsons-May store became a Macy's Home Store. The mall was renovated in 2013, including new tile and paint throughout the mall concourses, redesign of the common spaces, upgrades to the main courts, food court and an outdoor patio expansion. The entire mall was brought up to ADA standards.

Borders closed and became Sports Authority in 2011, but it too went out of business in 2016 and the space was taken over by Dave & Buster's.

In 2013, Ross Stores took over the space vacated by Circuit City.

In 2015, Sears Holdings spun off its 235 properties, including the Sears at Northridge Fashion Center, into Seritage Growth Properties.

Sears closed this location on January 5, 2020, after an announcement in November 2019 that the chain would be shutting down 96 stores nationwide. The former Sears was replaced in May 2021 by a new Dick's Sporting Goods store on the lower level and a Curacao store on the upper level. Other tenants that now occupy the former space are Gold's Gym and Blaze Pizza.

On April 12, 2022, Porto's Bakery took over the space vacated by Sears Auto Center.

== In popular culture ==
In the 1987 sci-fi comedy film Innerspace, the mall's interior was used as the fictional "Santa Clara Fashion Square" in which the climax of a chase sequence took place early in the film.

== Anchors ==
- AMC Theatres (formerly Pacific Theatres and Robinsons-May and J.W. Robinson's)
- JCPenney
- Macy's Women’s / Children’s (formerly Bullock's)
- Macy's Men’s / Home (formerly Robinsons-May and May Company)
- Dave & Buster's (formerly Sports Authority, Borders Books & Music, and The Broadway)
- Dick's Sporting Goods (formerly Sears (lower level))
- Curacao (formerly Sears (upper level))

== Gallery ==
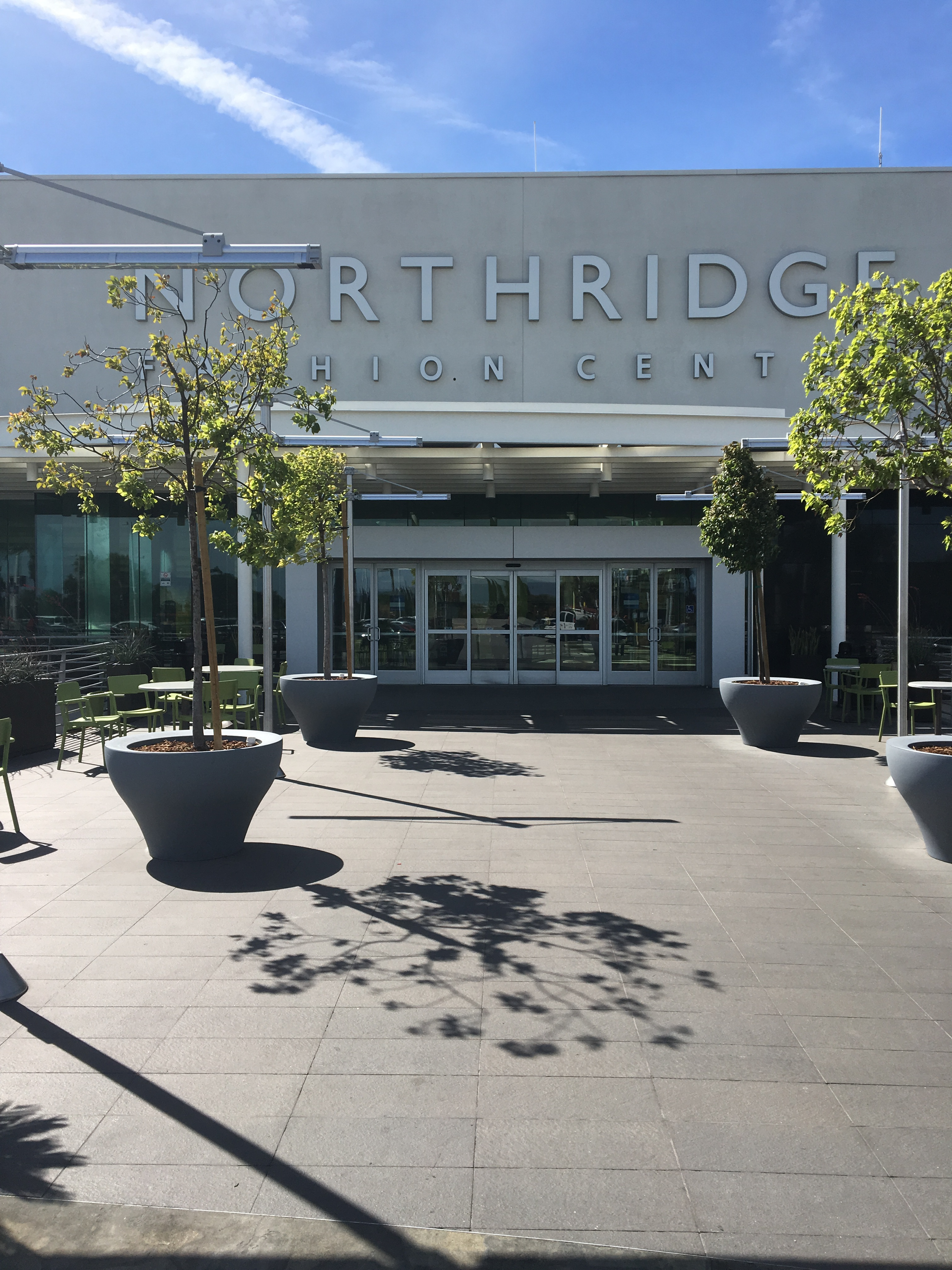
Northridge Fashion Center Level 2 entrance

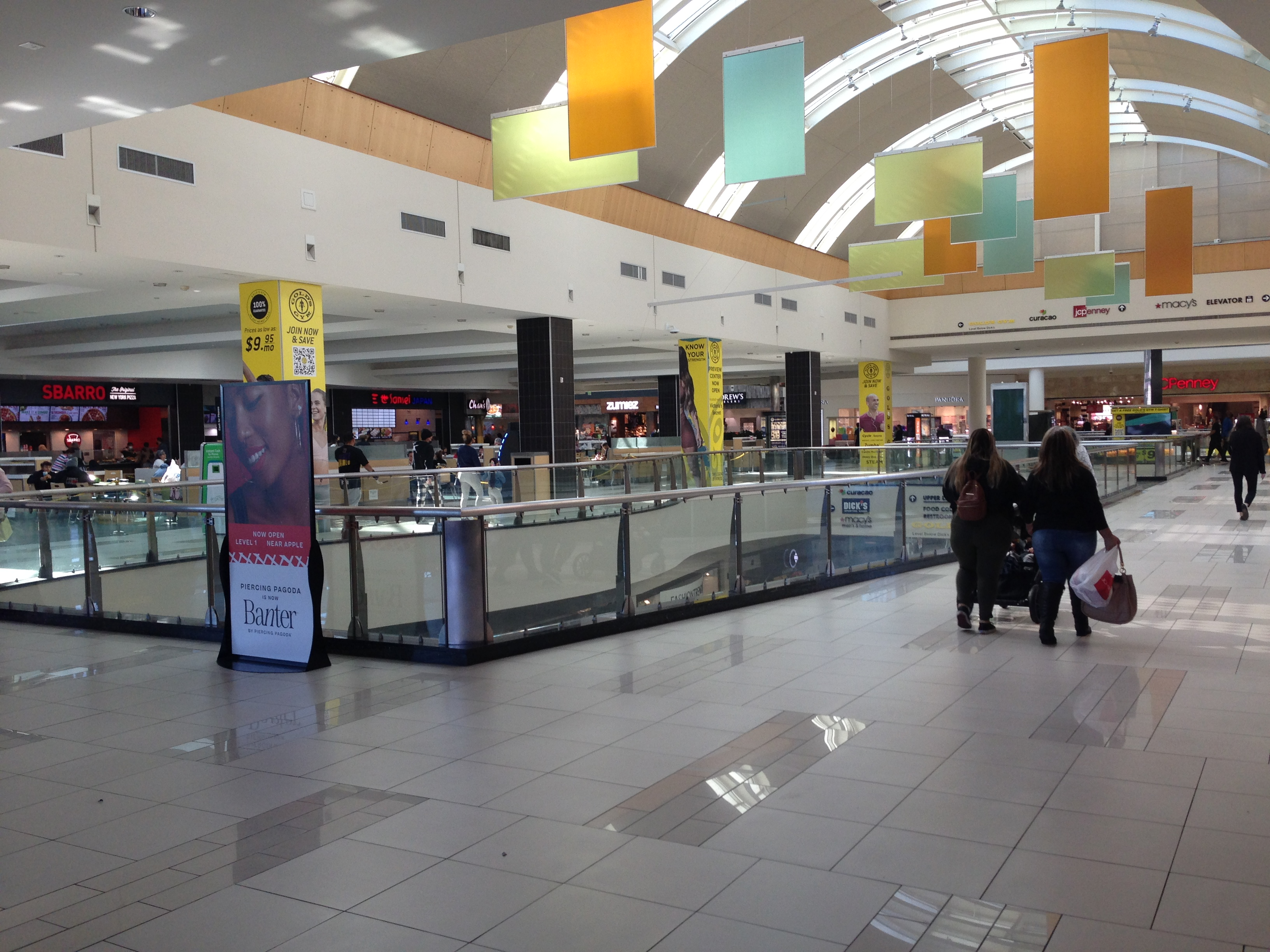
Interior of the Northridge Fashion Center

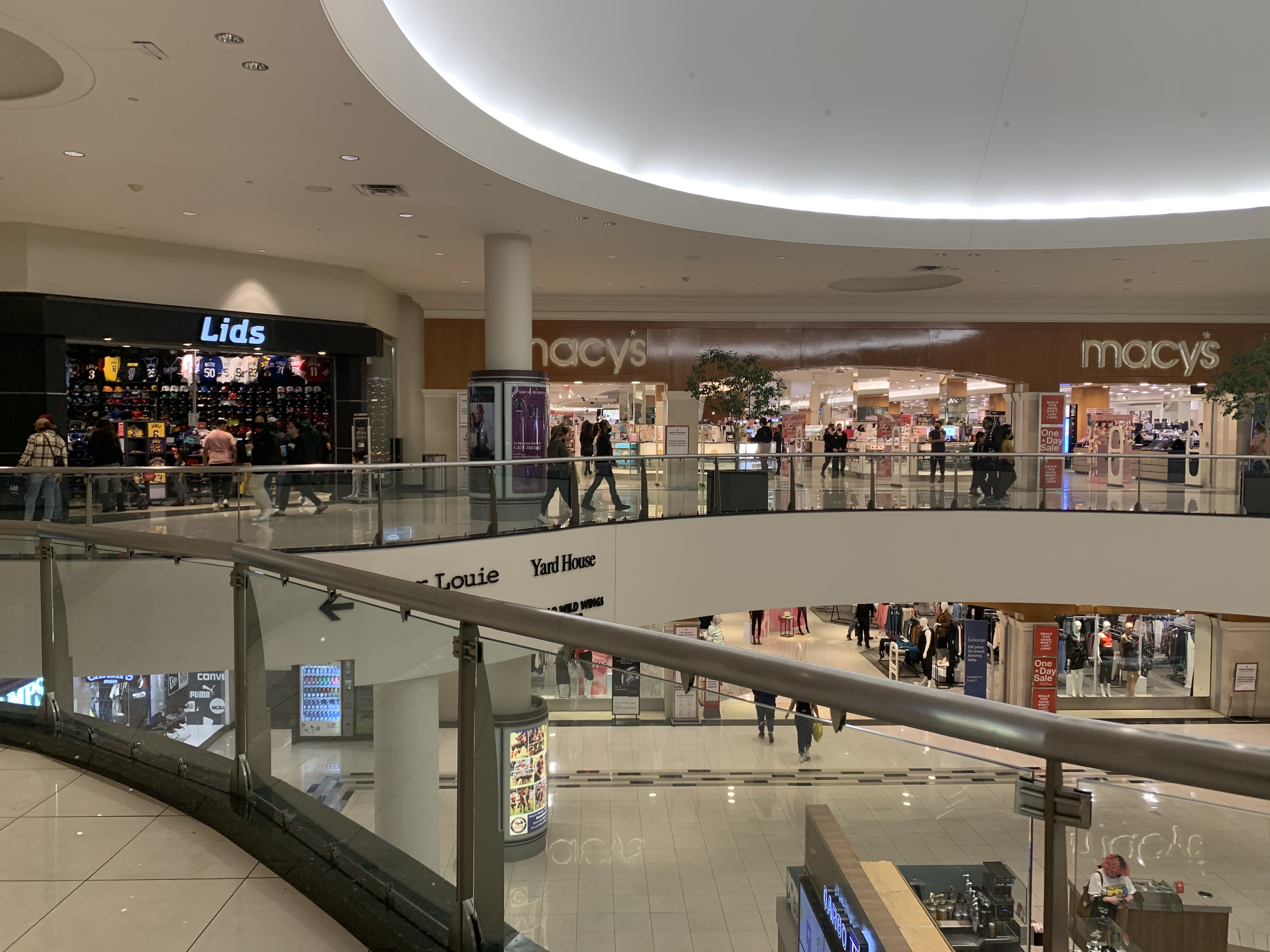
One of the Macy's anchor tenants (formerly Bullock's) located next to Lids

Destruction of Bullock's caused by the 1994 Northridge earthquake
