= Cycadelic Records =

Swap meet in Compton, California

Cycadelic Records is a record label that originated as a swap meet stall in the 1980s. It was founded by Korean-born Wan Joon Kim (born 1933 or 1934; died March 13, 2013), who sold the music of early gangsta rap artists. It was located at the Compton Swap Meet (officially Compton Fashion Center), an indoor swap meet in Compton, California until the building's closure in 2015. Kim has been called the "godfather of gangsta rap", and the Compton Swap Meet has been referenced by many rappers.

Kim, who had immigrated from Korea to Los Angeles in 1976, began selling at swap meets to make money. After a group of Korean swap meet vendors founded the Compton Swap Meet in 1985, Kim opened a stall. He began selling hip-hop music and became one of the first to sell gangsta rap records, befriending rappers. He was one of the first to sell music by artists such as N.W.A. The swap meet was featured in the music video for "California Love" by 2Pac and Dr. Dre. Kim's business remained popular through the 1990s. Kim died in 2013, and the building closed in 2015. Kim's son, Kirk Kim, continued the business as a record label, signing international rappers.

== History ==
=== Background ===
Compton Fashion Center
- Interactive map of the Compton Fashion Center area

General information
- Location: 2100 N Long Beach Blvd, Compton, California, US
- Coordinates: 33°54′36″N 118°12′31″W
- Opened: 1985
- Closed: 2015

Wan Joon Kim was born in Chōsen, in what is now North Korea, between 1933 and 1934. After the liberation and division of the Korean peninsula, he fled North Korea by fishing boat in 1950. He and his wife, Boo Ja, immigrated to the United States in 1976 and joined an early wave of Korean immigrants to Los Angeles. They immigrated with three young children, including Kirk and Jinna. Wan Joon and Boo Ja began selling items at swap meets as his source of income, initially selling hair clips. Wan Joon became interested in hip-hop music upon seeing the popularity of vendor Steve Yano, who sold hip-hop CDs at the Roadium Open Air Market in Torrance. Roadium was one of many swap meets to sell records of West Coast hip hop, a genre that emerged in the 1980s, and swap meets would become part of the genre's subcultural folklore.

The Compton Fashion Center was established in 1985 by six Korean swap meet vendors, including Doo Choi, who became its president. It was the first indoor swap meet in Southern California. The vendors purchased a former Sears store in Compton, California for $2.8 million, spending another $1.4 million to convert it to a swap meet. The swap meet had 350 stalls, each ten feet across, in a design influenced by Korean and Latin American markets. It was near the large outdoor swap meets of Roadium and Paramount, and targeted a Black and Hispanic demographic. By 1987, the building had 300 vendors, 60% of which were owned by Koreans, selling a range of products and foods. The Compton Swap Meet was one of the largest in the region. It had a successful business model with a high ratio of rent money to area, enabled small businesses run by immigrants, and provided products in an area that largely lacked chain retailers. This business model became popular; by 1991, Greater Los Angeles had over 100 indoor swap meets, mostly owned by Koreans, operating in most of the area's racial minority neighborhoods.

=== Operation ===
The Compton Swap Meet invited vendors who had worked at Roadium, including the Kims, who felt that an indoor market would be more comfortable. They rented a stall next to the building's entrance for $500 per month, becoming the third vendor to rent a stall at the market. His stall was known as the Cycadelic Music Corner or Cycadelic Records. A music wholesaler recommended that Kim sell genres such as rap. Gangsta rap was an obscure genre that few stores sold due to its references to violence and drug use. Kim was a fan of classical music and needed his daughters to help him understand the English used in gangsta rap songs, but he liked selling records of the genre. Wan Joon and Boo Ja Kim built connections with local rappers, who called them "Pops" and "Mama". As rappers distributed music within the community without record labels, Kim became the first to sell many of their releases, gaining a reputation for supporting new artists. Some of these artists became successful, including Bobby Wilson, who sold 15,000 records in one year. Kim made a significant profit from the business.

Cycadelic Music Corner became a gathering place for West Coast hip-hop musicians and fans. The Compton Swap Meet's popularity among the hip-hop subculture spread beyond Cycadelic, with rapper OG Daddy V selling albums from a van parked near the stall. Kim's stall carried the first releases of rappers who would later become famous, such as Ice Cube and Eazy-E, who formed the group N.W.A, as well as DJ Quik. Kim was the sole seller of N.W.A's early releases, which frequently sold out. It was one of the first sellers of the group's first album, Straight Outta Compton. N.W.A highlighted the Compton Swap Meet in two episodes of Yo! MTV Raps in 1988 and 1989, discussing its role as a provider of hip-hop fashion. The music video for "California Love" (1995), by 2Pac and Dr. Dre, was filmed at the Compton Swap Meet. The video opens with 2Pac telling Dr. Dre on the phone, "Meet me at the Compton Swap Meet", and it shows the two flaunting their wealth, alluding to the market's popularity across social classes.

Despite tensions between African-Americans and Koreans during the 1992 Los Angeles riots, which led to boycotts against some swap meets, Kim maintained his connections with the community. He recounted to The Los Angeles Times, "Most of my customers were the gang-bangers and drug dealers, so I built a friendship with them." In the 1990s, the demographics of Compton shifted to have fewer Black people, and gangsta rap gained worldwide popularity. Cycadelic Records continued to sell music to people from across Southern California.

Kim's son, Kirk, was in charge of Cycadelic by 2012. Kirk, unlike his father, was a fan of gangsta rap. In 2012, he established a record label under the name Cycadelic Records, which released albums by local artists such as B.G. Knocc Out. At the stall, he sold Chicano gangsta rap music and began selling online. The elder Kim worked at the stall once a week. Kim died of cancer on March 13, 2013. The Compton Fashion Center closed in January 2015 to be replaced by a Walmart store, requiring vendors to leave with thirty days' notice. Cycadelic relocated across the street. Kirk Kim then focused on supporting West Coast hip-hop in South Korea and China, as well as in the United States. Cycadelic Records signed its first Korean artist, West Coast Hangookins, in April 2016. Kim also opened a hip-hop venue called Club Compton in Itaewon, Seoul, South Korea.

== Legacy ==
Kim has been called the "godfather of gangsta rap" by The Los Angeles Times and NPR. Several rappers have referenced the Compton Swap Meet. According to data from Genius.com in 2025, it has been mentioned in 33 songs, more than any other swap meet. These include Dr. Dre in his 1992 album The Chronic. Kendrick Lamar's 2015 album To Pimp a Butterfly mentions the Compton Swap Meet in two songs: "Wesley's Theory", which includes the lyric "put the Compton Swap Meet next to the White House, and "King Kunta", whose music video features the building alongside other Compton locations. The video briefly shows Lamar dancing on the roof of the building. Lamar has said that he went to the swap meet as a child and that meeting 2Pac during the filming of "California Love", when he was eight, inspired him to become a rapper.
