= Curacao (retail store) =

Retail store

- Company type: Private
- Industry: Retail
- Founded: 1978 (48 years ago)
- Headquarters: Los Angeles, California, USA
- Number of locations: 13
- Website: http://www.icuracao.com

Curacao (pronounced Koo-ra-sao), formerly La Curacao, is a large-format retail store chain and finance company with export, travel and money transfer services. Founded in 1978, Curacao is headquartered in Los Angeles with retail locations in California, Arizona and Nevada. The company operates under the legal name Adir International, LLC.

== Services ==
Curacao sells most of its merchandise on credit, and has opened accounts for over two million private label cardholders. The company's services also include Curacao Travel, Curacao Money Transfer, and Curacao Export.

== History ==
=== Founding ===
Curacao began as a consumer-product door-to-door sales company, in Burbank, California. It became popular among the Latino community who did not have access to credit. Salesmen allowed customers to buy their goods by placing a down payment and then returning to the customer's residence to collect payments on a regular basis. This service eventually evolved into Curacao's proprietary credit business.

=== Expansion ===
In 1983, La Curacao moved to the Pico-Union district in Los Angeles. In 1995, La Curacao opened its second store in the Panorama City district of the San Fernando Valley inside the Panorama Mall. The Panorama location permanently closed in February 2025 due to the demolition of the mall for future redevelopment. Their stores featured Mesoamerican style decor and child care. In 2012, La Curacao was renamed Curacao, undergoing complete rebranding.

Curacao currently has locations in Los Angeles, South Gate, Huntington Park, San Bernardino, Lynwood, Santa Ana, Chino, Phoenix, Anaheim, Tucson, Las Vegas and Northridge.

== Legal Issues ==
In October 2017, The People of California sued Adir International, Inc. (Curacao) and CEO Ron Azarkman for deceptive practices, particularly selling unnecessary insurance products bundled with high-interest financing, targeting low-income and non-English-speaking customers. The lawsuit exposed how Curacao misled consumers about the nature and necessity of these insurance products, often without providing proper documentation, making it difficult for customers to file claims or even realize they had purchased insurance.

In April 2023, the court found Curacao guilty of 318,807 violations of the California Insurance Code, imposing a $7.97 million penalty and issuing a permanent injunction to prevent further deceptive practices. The court cited a deeply entrenched pattern of unethical behavior, designed to maximize profits at the expense of unsuspecting consumers, dating back to January 2014. Attempts by the defendants to argue that many violations fell outside the statute of limitations were rejected due to a pre-trial stipulation that extended the relevant period for claims.

Internal documents and numerous consumer complaints revealed that Curacao's upper management, including Ron Azarkman, were fully aware of and encouraged these deceptive practices. "The internal documents and complaints showcased a deliberate strategy to defraud customers through predatory practices," as noted in the amended complaint. This calculated scheme prioritized profit over consumer rights and well-being, reflecting a blatant disregard for ethical business conduct.

Further complicating their defense, the California Attorney General blocked Curacao from using their insurance from Starr Indemnity to cover legal expenses, citing California Insurance Code § 533.5(b) which forbids coverage in certain consumer protection cases brought by the state. This decision was challenged by Adir in the U.S. Supreme Court, but the case was not heard. The Ninth Circuit Court of Appeals upheld the district court’s decision, affirming that Starr Indemnity had no duty to defend or indemnify Adir under the explicit language of the insurance policy.
