= Plaza México (Lynwood, California) =

Retail and cultural center in Lynwood, California

Coordinates: 33.92947°N 118.21577°W

Plaza México is a multi-purpose retail and cultural center in Lynwood, California. It includes multiple shops, including individual stores and an indoor swap meet; many dining options; and entertainment selections, Plaza México is a cultural space for the Mexican-American community. Plaza México incorporates the design and style of plazas all over Mexico. Plaza Mexico hosts cultural festivals and performances, such as "El Grito de la Independencia" and "Cinco de Mayo" festivities.

== Mexico-themed architecture and design ==
Plaza México seeks to recreate Mexican regional and national icons. The architecture is based on traditional Mexican towns and contains a variety of Mexican cultural symbols from different eras. The owners hired two Mexican public relations coordinators to select the icons, cultural symbols and events that are portrayed. The coordinators also selected construction materials to build Plaza México in order to produce quality and Mexican authenticity. The architectural decorations like the plaza, kiosk, fountains and monuments are similar to those of many Mexican cities. For example, Plaza México has replicas of the Angel of Independence of México City and the kiosk of the Zócalo of San Miguel de Allende, Guanajuato. The plaza was reproduced with characteristics based on the appearance of the Government Palace of Jalisco at Guadalajara. The plaza’s pavement is made of adoquín stone and the benches are made of crafted iron, like the ones found in the provinces of México. Plaza México was constructed using materials from México such as stone from Zacatecas and talavera from Puebla. The mall is physically structured with open streets and a plaza to reconstruct the environment of a traditional Mexican town.

== "Angel of Independence" ==
The reproduction of Mexico City’s Angel of Independence, which symbolizes Mexican nationhood in Mexico, marks the major entrance to Plaza Mexico. This sculpture serves as the master symbol of Plaza Mexico representing its importance in the community. The Angel has already developed some history in Plaza Mexico becoming an important site of congregation for political rallies. For example, during the March and April 2006 student walkouts for US congressional immigration reform proposals, large groups met at the Angel before marching to Los Angeles City Hall. In addition, during the 2006 FIFA World Cup, community members and other visitors gathered in Plaza Mexico to watch the games and after a victory or tie they would congregate around the Angel of Independence.

== Tourist attraction ==
Many of the visitors consist of immigrant clienteles, some of them are unable to travel to Mexico because they do not have the legal or economic resources. Most of the visitors are of low or middle-low income status and many some of their families are undocumented immigrants and face harsh border conditions. The Plaza also attracts other local and regional visitors. The Plaza also has an altar for the “Virgen de Guadalupe” frame and the crucified “Jesus Christ” sculpture. The altar is inside a small temple located outside by the plaza. The Plaza sells different types of souvenirs, such as rosaries, crosses, keychains and T-shirts of Virgin reproductions and Mexico flags and colors.

== Festivities and cultural events ==
The Plaza hosts a number of Mexican festivities and cultural events, such as Mexican folk music, dances, Aztec and Mejica performances, cultural exhibits and other artistic expressions. Some of the traditional celebrations that are celebrated are “Cinco de Mayo,” “El Grito de la Independencia,” and Virgin of Guadalupe: “El dia 12 de deciembre”.
