= Museum Square =

Office and retail building on the Miracle Mile, Los Angeles

Coordinates: 34.0624°N 118.3536°W

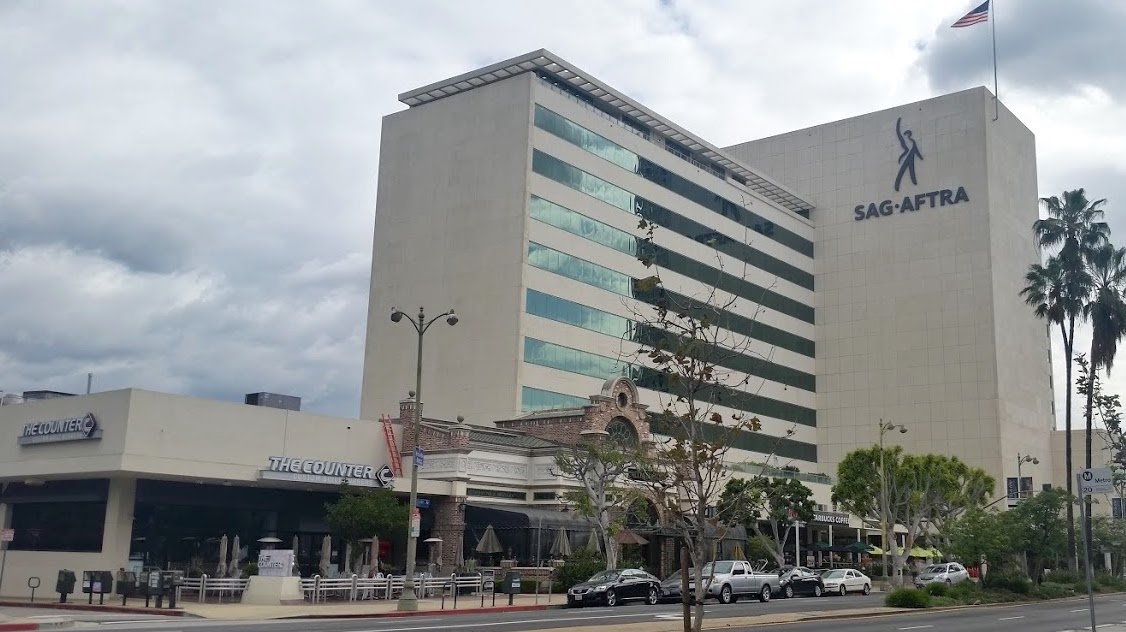
- Interactive map of the Museum Square area

General information
- Architectural style: International Style
- Location: 5757–5779 Wilshire Boulevard
- Opened: 1949

Design and construction
- Architect: Welton Beckett

Museum Square or the SAG-AFTRA Building, originally the Prudential Building is a landmark building at 5757–5779 Wilshire Boulevard, spanning two city blocks along that street, on the Miracle Mile, Los Angeles housing SAG-AFTRA. It was opened in 1949 and was the tallest and, at 517,000 sq ft (48,000 m^{2}), the largest privately owned structure in Los Angeles at that time. Welton Beckett of Wurdeman & Becket was the architect who designed it in the International Style. The building was part of the decentralization program by Prudential (1948-1965), with Rubin arguing that it included a "deliberate" urban-shaping policy: dazzling office buildings with large parking lots were constructed at the edges of established business districts.

Arts & Architecture magazine described the building as a symbol of Los Angeles and the western way of life. During the 1930s and 1940s, the Miracle Mile had become one of the most important shopping districts in the city, with several large department stores and several junior department stores. This building was symbolic of the district's addition function as a major office district. Prudential Insurance Los Angeles offices were located here as was an Ohrbach's department store until it moved down the street in 1965, and a branch of Security-First National Bank. Addition of an office building by Prudential furthered the spread of office space along Wilshire Boulevard, with the land around turning into a high-density office district by 1960s.

== Sources ==
- Rubin, Elihu James (2009). "Mid-Town on the Miracle Mile: Prudential in Los Angeles". Insuring the City: The Prudential Center and the Reshaping of Boston (Doctor of Philosophy in Architecture thesis). University of California, Berkeley. pp. 44–50.
