= Indoor swap meet =

Type of mall

An indoor swap meet in the United States, especially Southern California and Nevada, is a type of bazaar, a permanent, indoor shopping center open during normal retail hours, with fixed booths or storefronts for the vendors.

Indoor swap meets house vendors that sell a wide variety of goods and services, especially clothing and electronics. For example, vendors in the Fantastic Indoor Swap Meet in Las Vegas sell

clothing, furniture, handbags and toys,…but there’s a ton more: flowers and plants, pet supplies, leather goods, sporting equipment, perfume and cosmetics, luggage and electronics, to name just a few. There also are booths for services, including window tinting, palm reading, alterations, engraving and estate planning. The majority of items sold here are new, although antique alley does feature some vintage and second-hand goods.

It is different in format to an outdoor swap meet, the equivalent of a flea market, generally open on a limited number of days and often without fixed locations for its vendors.

Indoor swap meets are present in many working-class communities across Southern California, with a concentration in Central Los Angeles.

Indoor swap meets include the Valley Indoor Swap Meet in Panorama City and Pomona (owned by the Maceric Co.), Anaheim Marketplace, Fantastic Indoor Swap Meet in Las Vegas, and the High Desert Indoor Swap Meet in Victorville. Longstanding indoor swap meets that are now defunct include the Pico Rivera Indoor Swap Meet and San Ysidro Indoor Swap Meet.

== History ==
Swap meets in the U.S. long consisted of U.S.-born vendors who sold mostly secondhand goods in outdoor spaces. In the 1970s, Latino immigrants started selling cultural goods and affordable services at swap meets in Southern California and some swap meets started resembling the tianguis, open-air markets, of Mexico. At the same time, drive-in movie theaters were becoming less popular, and their owners eagerly rented them out during the day to outdoor swap meets, which proliferated. Then, mostly Korean immigrants used their connections in the growing import/export trade with Asia to establish their own swap meet stalls and stock them with new, cheap goods from Asia instead of secondhand goods. In the 1980s and 1990s as properties in South Los Angeles and parts of Central L.A. became abandoned, Korean immigrants bought them and turned them into indoor swap meets.

== Connection with gangsta rap ==
A former Sears store in Compton turned into the Compton Fashion Fair indoor swap meet. Music stall operator Wan Joon Kim helped launch the career of various local gangsta rap artists, as did Steve Yano at the Roadium on Redondo Beach Boulevard in Torrance.

== Articles about indoor swap meets ==
=== California ===
- Indio Grand Marketplace, Indio
- Plaza México, Lynwood
- Valley Indoor Swap Meet, Panorama City, Los Angeles
