= 2015 California Dream season =

- Conference: 2nd Western

Record
- 2015 record: 9 wins, 5 losses
- Home record: 6 wins, 1 loss
- Road record: 3 wins, 4 losses
- Games won–lost: 283–259

Team info
- Owner(s): Jeff Launius (majority); Bob Kaliski; Michael Malone
- Coach: David Macpherson
- Stadium: Dream Stadium at Sunrise Mall (capacity: 2,400)
- Average attendance: 1,291

The 2015 California Dream season was the 23rd and final season of the franchise in World TeamTennis (WTT) and its first and only season based in California.

Led by Anabel Medina Garrigues, who was WTT Female Co-Most Valuable Player, Neal Skupski, who was WTT Male Rookie of the Year, and Jarmila Gajdošová, who led WTT in winning percentage in women's singles, the Dream had 9 wins and 5 losses and qualified for the franchise's first playoff berth since 2013. The Dream fell to the Austin Aces, 25–14, in the Western Conference Championship Match.

On January 13, 2016, WTT announced that the Dream franchise had been terminated due to noncompliance with the team's obligations to the league.

== Season recap ==
=== Relocation to California ===
On February 23, 2015, WTT announced that a new ownership group had taken control of the Texas Wild and moved the team to Citrus Heights, California, renaming it the California Dream.

=== Trade for Bryan brothers and draft ===
At the WTT draft on March 16, 2015, it was announced that 2014 WTT Coach of the Year David Macpherson had become the new head coach of the Dream replacing Brent Haygarth. Macpherson has deep roots in the Sacramento area and wanted to return there with its new WTT team. Upon announcing his move to the Dream, Macpherson said, "I’m very excited to be coaching in the city where I started my WTT career back in 1992." Since Macpherson has long served as the coach for the Bryan brothers, it was inevitable that the twins would want to follow him just as they did when he was hired as the San Diego Aviators' head coach in 2014. Consequently, prior to the draft, the Aviators traded Bob and Mike Bryan to the Dream for financial consideration. The Bryan brothers were the only selection made by the Dream in the marquee portion of the draft. In the roster portion of the draft, the Dream left 2014 WTT Female Rookie of the Year Anabel Medina Garrigues unprotected in the first round and instead chose Jarmila Gajdošová. Medina was still available in the second round, and the Dream selected her but had to risk leaving Aisam Qureshi unprotected to do so. The Dream then left Alex Bogomolov, Jr. unprotected in the third round and selected Tennys Sandgren. In the fourth round of the draft, the Dream could not protect Darija Jurak, because it already had two female full-time players. Instead, the Dream used its final pick to select Qureshi who was still available.

=== Other player transactions ===
On July 9, 2015, the Dream announced it had signed Neal Skupski as a roster player to replace Aisam Qureshi who withdrew from WTT for undisclosed reasons. Under WTT Rule 402C, unless Qureshi demonstrates that his withdrawal was due to an injury, he is ineligible to play in WTT for the 2016 and 2017 seasons.

=== Opening the season ===
The franchise played its first match as the California Dream on the road against the San Diego Aviators on July 12, 2015. Jarmila Gajdošová lost the opening set of women's singles to Chanelle Scheepers in a tiebreaker. Tennys Sandgren earned the first set win in Dream history when he took a men's singles tiebreaker from James Blake in the second set to tie the match at 9. The Aviators won each of the final three sets to secure a 24–19 victory.

The following evening, the Dream played its inaugural match at the new Dream Stadium at Sunrise Mall against the Springfield Lasers. Sandgren won the opening set of men's singles for the Dream in a tiebreaker. Gajdošová and Anabel Medina Garrigues followed with a 5–2 set win in women's doubles to give the Dream a 10–6 lead. Medina teamed with Neal Skupski in mixed doubles for another 5–2 set win, and the Dream was on top, 15–8. After Gajdošová lost the women's singles set in a tiebreaker, the Lasers took the final set of men's doubles, 5–3, to cut the Dream's lead to 22–18 and send the match to extended play. Sandgren and Skupski won the first game of extended play to secure a 23–18 victory.

=== Five consecutive wins after a slow start ===
At the midway point of the season, the Dream found itself with 3 wins and 4 losses. Two of those losses were matches against the Austin Aces in which the Dream carried leads into the final set. However, the Dream started the second half of its season with a home victory over the Springfield Lasers. It followed this by sweeping a home-and-home series with the San Diego Aviators before heading to the East Coast. A road win over the Boston Lobsters was the Dream's fourth straight victory and put its record at 7 wins and 4 losses.

On July 26, the Dream had an opportunity to clinch a playoff berth if the Aces would defeat the Aviators and the Dream could beat the Philadelphia Freedoms. While both matches started at the same time, the Aces raced to a quick 25–8 victory and spent only an hour and 31 minutes on the court in doing so. In contrast, the second set of the Dream's match with the Freedoms was wrapping up around the time the Austin-San Diego match ended. After two sets against the Freedoms, the Dream found itself trailing, 9–7, with the knowledge that a win would mean a playoff spot. Bob and Mike Bryan turned things around with a 5–1 set win in men's doubles that put the Dream on top, 12–10, after three sets. Jarmila Gajdošová and Anabel Medina Garrigues increased the lead to 17–14, when they took a tiebreaker in the women's doubles set. Medina and Bob Bryan put the match away with a 5–2 mixed doubles set win that gave the Dream a 22–16 victory in the match and the first playoff berth for the franchise since 2013.

=== Playoffs ===
The Dream went on the road to play the Austin Aces in the Western Conference Championship Match on July 30, 2015. The originally-scheduled start time of the match of 7:00 p.m. CDT was pushed back, because weather issues caused the Dream's flight to be delayed. The first ball was finally struck at 9:43 p.m. CDT, and the Aces took charge from the start with Teymuraz Gabashvili and Alla Kudryavtseva opening the match with a 5–2 set win in mixed doubles over Neal Skupski and Anabel Medina Garrigues. Kudryavtseva and Elina Svitolina followed with a 5–3 set win in women's doubles over Medina and Jarmila Gajdošová to give the Aces a 10–5 lead. Gabashvili and Jarmere Jenkins won a tiebreaker in men's doubles over Skupski and Tennys Sandgren to increase the Aces' lead to 15–9 at halftime. Svitolina broke Jarmila Gajdošová, the top-ranked player in WTT in women's singles during the regular season, in the fourth and sixth games of the set for a 5–1 win and a 20–10 Aces lead with one set remaining. With the clock having already struck midnight, Gabashvili served an ace to end the tiebreaker in men's singles against Sandgren and give the Aces a dominant 25–14 victory and the Western Conference championship. The Aces won all five sets in securing the franchise's first conference title since 2006, when they were the Newport Beach Breakers.

=== Financial troubles and termination of franchise ===
In December 2015, Randy Peters Catering of Citrus Heights, California sued the Dream and its three owners in Sacramento County Superior Court demanding $19,249 for its unpaid bills as the team's food concessionaire. Also in December 2015, one of the Dream's minority owners, Bob Kaliski, told The Sacramento Bee that he had personally lost $175,000 investing in the team and that majority owner Jeff Launius had told him the Dream owed its vendors $192,000 at the end of the season. Kaliski said, "I don't know if the team is going to be back or not. I know I'm not going to be back. I don't know about the rest of the team." WTT said that the Dream had until the end of December to meet its financial commitments to the league in order to secure its spot for 2016.

On January 13, 2016, WTT announced that the Dream franchise had been terminated due to noncompliance with the team's obligations to the league.

== Event chronology ==
- March 16, 2015: The Dream acquired Bob and Mike Bryan in a trade with the San Diego Aviators for financial consideration.
- March 16, 2015: The Dream protected Bob and Mike Bryan, chose Jarmila Gajdošová and Tennys Sandgren as new additions to the team and selected returning team members Anabel Medina Garrigues and Aisam Qureshi both of whom it had left unprotected at the WTT draft.
- March 16, 2015: The Dream hired David Macpherson as their head coach replacing Brent Haygarth.
- July 9, 2015: The Dream signed Neal Skupski as a roster player to replace Aisam Qureshi who withdrew from WTT for undisclosed reasons.
- July 26, 2015: With a record of 8 wins and 4 losses, the Dream clinched a playoff berth with a 22–16 win over the Philadelphia Freedoms.
- July 30, 2015: The Dream lost the Western Conference Championship Match, 25–14, to the Austin Aces.
- January 13, 2016: WTT announced that the Dream franchise had been terminated due to noncompliance with the team's obligations to the league.

== Draft picks ==
Since the Wild had the second-worst record among nonplayoff teams in 2014, the Dream selected second in each round of the draft. Unlike previous seasons in which WTT conducted its Marquee Player Draft and its Roster Player Draft on different dates about one month apart, the league conducted a single draft at the Indian Wells Tennis Garden in Indian Wells, California on March 16, 2015. The selections made by the Dream are shown in the table below.

Draft type	Round	No.	Overall	Player chosen	Prot?	Notes
Marquee	1	2	2	(United States) Bob and Mike Bryan	Y	Doubles team
Marquee	2	2	9	Pass	–	
Marquee	3	2	16	Pass	–	
Roster	1	2	2	(Australia) Jarmila Gajdošová	N	
Roster	2	2	9	(Spain) Anabel Medina Garrigues	N	
Roster	3	2	16	(United States) Tennys Sandgren	N	
Roster	4	2	23	(Pakistan) Aisam Qureshi	N	

== Match log ==
=== Regular season ===
Legend
Dream Win	Dream Loss
Home team in CAPS

Match	Date	Venue and location	Result and details	Record
1	July 12	Omni La Costa Resort and Spa; Carlsbad, California	SAN DIEGO AVIATORS 24, California Dream 19 * WS: Chanelle Scheepers (Aviators) 5, Jarmila Gajdošová (Dream) 4 * MS: Tennys Sandgren (Dream) 5, James Blake (Aviators) 4 * MD: Raven Klaasen/James Blake (Aviators) 5, Tennys Sandgren/Neal Skupski (Dream) 2 * XD: Raven Klaasen/Darija Jurak (Aviators) 5, Neal Skupski/Jarmila Gajdošová (Dream) 4 * WD: Darija Jurak/Chanelle Scheepers (Aviators) 5, Jarmila Gajdošová/Anabel Medina Garrigues (Dream) 4	0–1
2	July 13	Dream Stadium at Sunrise Mall; Citrus Heights, California	CALIFORNIA DREAM 23, Springfield Lasers 18 (extended play) * MS: Tennys Sandgren (Dream) 5, Michael Russell (Lasers) 4 * WD: Jarmila Gajdošová/Anabel Medina Garrigues (Dream) 5, Anna-Lena Grönefeld/Varvara Lepchenko (Lasers) 2 * XD: Neal Skupski/Anabel Medina Garrigues (Dream) 5, Andre Begemann/Anna-Lena Grönefeld (Lasers) 2 * WS: Varvara Lepchenko (Lasers) 5, Jarmila Gajdošová (Dream) 4 * MD: Andre Begemann/Michael Russell (Lasers) 5, Tennys Sandgren/Neal Skupski (Dream) 3 * EP - MD: Tennys Sandgren/Neal Skupski (Dream) 1, Andre Begemann/Michael Russell (Lasers) 0	1–1
3	July 14	Dream Stadium at Sunrise Mall; Citrus Heights, California	CALIFORNIA DREAM 22, Philadelphia Freedoms 20 * MD: Marcelo Melo/Robby Ginepri (Freedoms) 5, Tennys Sandgren/Neal Skupski (Dream) 4 * WD: Jarmila Gajdošová/Anabel Medina Garrigues (Dream) 5, Coco Vandeweghe/Taylor Townsend (Freedoms) 4 * XD: Neal Skupski/Anabel Medina Garrigues (Dream) 5, Marcelo Melo/Coco Vandeweghe (Freedoms) 3 * WS: Coco Vandeweghe (Freedoms) 5, Jarmila Gajdošová (Dream) 3 * MS: Tennys Sandgren (Dream) 5, Robby Ginepri (Freedoms) 3	2–1
4	July 16	Gregory Gymnasium; Austin, Texas	AUSTIN ACES 20, California Dream 19 * WD: Jarmila Gajdošová/Anabel Medina Garrigues (Dream) 5, Nicole Gibbs/Alla Kudryavtseva (Aces) 2 * XD: Alla Kudryavtseva/Teymuraz Gabashvili (Aces) 5, Jarmila Gajdošová/Neal Skupski (Dream) 4 *** Jarmila Gajdošová substituted for Anabel Medina Garrigues at 4–2 * MD: Jarmere Jenkins/Teymuraz Gabashvili (Aces) 5, Tennys Sandgren/Neal Skupski (Dream) 2 * WS: Jarmila Gajdošová (Dream) 5, Nicole Gibbs (Aces) 3 * MS: Teymuraz Gabashvili (Aces) 5, Tennys Sandgren (Dream) 3	2–2
5	July 17	Dream Stadium at Sunrise Mall; Citrus Heights, California	Austin Aces 22, CALIFORNIA DREAM 16 * MD: Neal Skupski/Tennys Sandgren (Dream) 5, Jarmere Jenkins/Teymuraz Gabashvili (Aces) 2 * WD: Nicole Gibbs/Alla Kudryavtseva (Aces) 5, Anabel Medina Garrigues/Jarmila Gajdošová (Dream) 3 * XD: Teymuraz Gabashvili/Alla Kudryavtseva (Aces) 5, Neal Skupski/Jarmila Gajdošová (Dream) 1 * MS: Teymuraz Gabashvili (Aces) 5, Tennys Sandgren (Dream) 3 * WS: Nicole Gibbs (Aces) 5, Jarmila Gajdošová (Dream) 4	2–3
6	July 18	Dream Stadium at Sunrise Mall; Citrus Heights, California	CALIFORNIA DREAM 20, Boston Lobsters 17 * MS: Tennys Sandgren (Dream) 5, Alex Kuznetsov (Lobsters) 2 * WS: Jarmila Gajdošová (Dream) 5, Irina Falconi (Lobsters) 4 * MD: Alex Kuznetsov/Scott Lipsky (Lobsters) 5, Tennys Sandgren/Neal Skupski (Dream) 1 * WD: Irina Falconi/Arantxa Parra Santonja (Lobsters) 5, Anabel Medina Garrigues/Jarmila Gajdošová (Dream) 4 * XD: Neal Skupski/Anabel Medina Garrigues (Dream) 5, Scott Lipsky/Arantxa Parra Santonja (Lobsters) 1	3–3
7	July 19	Gregory Gymnasium; Austin, Texas	AUSTIN ACES 20, California Dream 18 * MD: Teymuraz Gabashvili/Jarmere Jenkins (Aces) 5, Tennys Sandgren/Neal Skupski (Dream) 4 * WS: Jarmila Gajdošová (Dream) 5, Nicole Gibbs (Aces) 3 * XD: Anabel Medina Garrigues/Neal Skupski (Dream) 5, Alla Kudryavtseva/Teymuraz Gabashvili (Aces) 2 * WD: Nicole Gibbs/Alla Kudryavtseva (Aces) 5, Jarmila Gajdošová/Anabel Medina Garrigues (Dream) 2 * MS: Teymuraz Gabashvili (Aces) 5, Tennys Sandgren (Dream) 2	3–4
8	July 21	Dream Stadium at Sunrise Mall; Citrus Heights, California	CALIFORNIA DREAM 22, Springfield Lasers 19 * MS: Michael Russell (Lasers) 5, Tennys Sandgren (Dream) 3 * WS: Jarmila Gajdošová (Dream) 5, Sachia Vickery (Lasers) 3 * MD: Andre Begemann/Michael Russell (Lasers) 5, Neal Skupski/Tennys Sandgren (Dream) 4 * WD: Jarmila Gajdošová/Anabel Medina Garrigues (Dream) 5, Anna-Lena Grönefeld/Sachia Vickery (Lasers) 4 * XD: Anabel Medina Garrigues/Neal Skupski (Dream) 5, Anna-Lena Grönefeld/Andre Begemann (Lasers) 2	4–4
9	July 22	Omni La Costa Resort and Spa; Carlsbad, California	California Dream 25, SAN DIEGO AVIATORS 11 * MD: Neal Skupski/Tennys Sandgren (Dream) 5, Raven Klaasen/Taylor Fritz (Aviators) 3 * WS: Jarmila Gajdošová (Dream) 5, Chanelle Scheepers (Aviators) 0 * MS: Tennys Sandgren (Dream) 5, Taylor Fritz (Aviators) 4 * WD: Anabel Medina Garrigues/Jarmila Gajdošová (Dream) 5, Chanelle Scheepers/Darija Jurak (Aviators) 3 * XD: Neal Skupski/Anabel Medina Garrigues (Dream) 5, Raven Klaasen/Darija Jurak (Aviators) 1	5–4
10	July 23	Dream Stadium at Sunrise Mall; Citrus Heights, California	CALIFORNIA DREAM 20, San Diego Aviators 19 * MS: Taylor Fritz (Aviators) 5, Tennys Sandgren (Dream) 4 * WS: Chanelle Scheepers (Aviators) 5, Jarmila Gajdošová (Dream) 3 * XD: Mike Bryan/Anabel Medina Garrigues (Dream) 5, Raven Klaasen/Darija Jurak (Aviators) 3 * WD: Chanelle Scheepers/Darija Jurak (Aviators) 5, Anabel Medina Garrigues/Jarmila Gajdošová (Dream) 3 * MD: Bob Bryan/Mike Bryan (Dream) 5, Raven Klaasen/Taylor Fritz (Aviators) 1	6–4
11	July 25	Boston Lobsters Tennis Center at the Manchester Athletic Club; Manchester-by-the-Sea, Massachusetts	California Dream 21, BOSTON LOBSTERS 19 (extended play) * MS: Tennys Sandgren (Dream) 5, Jason Jung (Lobsters) 3 * WS: Jarmila Gajdošová (Dream) 5, Irina Falconi (Lobsters) 2 * MD: Jason Jung/Scott Lipsky (Lobsters) 5, Bob Bryan/Mike Bryan (Dream) 2 * XD: Mike Bryan/Anabel Medina Garrigues (Dream) 5, Scott Lipsky/Arantxa Parra Santonja (Lobsters) 4 *** Mike Bryan substituted for Bob Bryan at 1–2 * WD: Irina Falconi/Arantxa Parra Santonja (Lobsters) 5, Anabel Medina Garrigues/Jarmila Gajdošová (Dream) 3 * EP - WD: Anabel Medina Garrigues/Jarmila Gajdošová (Dream) 1, Irina Falconi/Arantxa Parra Santonja (Lobsters) 0	7–4
12	July 26	The Pavilion; Radnor Township, Pennsylvania	California Dream 22, PHILADELPHIA FREEDOMS 16 * MS: Tennys Sandgren (Dream) 5, Robby Ginepri (Freedoms) 4 * WS: Taylor Townsend (Freedoms) 5, Jarmila Gajdošová (Dream) 2 * MD: Bob Bryan/Mike Bryan (Dream) 5, Robby Ginepri/Marcelo Melo (Freedoms) 1 * WD: Jarmila Gajdošová/Anabel Medina Garrigues (Dream) 5, Abigail Spears/Taylor Townsend (Freedoms) 4 * XD: Anabel Medina Garrigues/Bob Bryan (Dream) 5, Taylor Townsend/Marcelo Melo (Freedoms) 2	8–4
13	July 27	Kastles Stadium at the Charles E. Smith Center; Washington, District of Columbia	WASHINGTON KASTLES 19, California Dream 17 * XD: Neal Skupski/Anabel Medina Garrigues (Dream) 5, Leander Paes/Martina Hingis (Kastles) 3 * WS: Jarmila Gajdošová (Dream) 5, Martina Hingis (Kastles) 1 * MD: Leander Paes/Sam Querrey (Kastles) 5, Neal Skupski/Tennys Sandgren (Dream) 4 * WD: Martina Hingis/Anastasia Rodionova (Kastles) 5, Anabel Medina Garrigues/Jarmila Gajdošová (Dream) 1 * MS: Sam Querrey (Kastles) 5, Tennys Sandgren (Dream) 2	8–5
14	July 29	Dream Stadium at Sunrise Mall; Citrus Heights, California	CALIFORNIA DREAM 20, San Diego Aviators 15 * MD: Daniel Nguyen/Raven Klaasen (Aviators) 5, Neal Skupski/Tennys Sandgren (Dream) 3 * WS: Jarmila Gajdošová (Dream) 5, Chanelle Scheepers (Aviators) 0 * XD: Darija Jurak/Raven Klaasen (Aviators) 5, Jarmila Gajdošová/Neal Skupski (Dream) 2 *** Jarmila Gajdošová substituted for Anabel Medina Garrigues at 2–4 * WD: Anabel Medina Garrigues/Jarmila Gajdošová (Dream) 5, Chanelle Scheepers/Darija Jurak (Aviators) 2 * MS: Tennys Sandgren (Dream) 5, Daniel Nguyen (Aviators) 3	9–5

=== Playoffs ===
Legend
Dream Win	Dream Loss
Home team in CAPS

Western Conference Championship Match

Date	Venue and location	Result and details
July 30	Gregory Gymnasium; Austin, Texas	AUSTIN ACES 25, California Dream 14 * XD: Teymuraz Gabashvili/Alla Kudryavtseva (Aces) 5, Neal Skupski/Anabel Medina Garrigues (Dream) 2 * WD: Alla Kudryavtseva/Elina Svitolina (Aces) 5, Anabel Medina Garrigues/Jarmila Gajdošová (Dream) 3 * MD: Jarmere Jenkins/Teymuraz Gabashvili (Aces) 5, Neal Skupski/Tennys Sandgren (Dream) 4 * WS: Elina Svitolina (Aces) 5, Jarmila Gajdošová (Dream) 1 * MS: Teymuraz Gabashvili (Aces) 5, Tennys Sandgren (Dream) 4

== Team personnel ==
=== Players and coaches ===
(Note: Aisam Qureshi withdrew from WTT for undisclosed reasons before the start of the 2015 season and was removed from the roster. Under WTT Rule 402C, unless he demonstrates that his withdrawal was due to an injury, he is ineligible to play in WTT for the 2016 and 2017 seasons.)

- (Australia) David Macpherson, Coach
- (United States) Bob Bryan
- (United States) Mike Bryan
- (Australia) Jarmila Gajdošová
- (Spain) Anabel Medina Garrigues
- (United States) Tennys Sandgren
- (United Kingdom) Neal Skupski

=== Front office ===
- Jeff Launius, Majority Owner
- Bob Kaliski, Owner
- Michael Malone, Owner

== Statistics ==
Players are listed in order of their game-winning percentage provided they played in at least 40% of the Dream's games in that event, which is the WTT minimum for qualification for league leaders in individual statistical categories. (Note: There may be minor errors in some of the statistics shown in this section, since the numbers reported by WTT on its website cannot possibly be correct. For example, the sum of 3-all points played by male mixed doubles players does not equal the sum of 3-all points played by female mixed doubles players. Where possible, posting errors have been identified and corrected based on the match statistical summaries. However, in some cases, the original source match summaries are suspect as well. For example, in the July 16 match, the Dream's male player in the mixed doubles set converted 1 of 1 break point opportunities, while the Dream's two female players who participated in the set converted a total of 2 of 2 break point opportunities.)

Men's singles - regular season

Player	GP	GW	GL	PCT	A	DF	BPW	BPP	BP%	3APW	3APP	3AP%
Tennys Sandgren	114	56	58	.491	15	5	11	34	.324	10	25	.400
Total	114	56	58	.491	15	5	11	34	.324	10	25	.400

Women's singles - regular season

Player	GP	GW	GL	PCT	A	DF	BPW	BPP	BP%	3APW	3APP	3AP%
Jarmila Gajdošová	106	60	46	.566	24	19	23	52	.442	13	26	.500
Total	106	60	46	.566	24	19	23	52	.442	13	26	.500

Men's doubles - regular season

Player	GP	GW	GL	PCT	A	DF	BPW	BPP	BP%	3APW	3APP	3AP%
Tennys Sandgren	87	38	49	.437	1	7	4	26	.154	9	24	.375
Neal Skupski	87	38	49	.437	11	11	4	26	.154	9	24	.375
Bob Bryan	19	12	7	.632	0	0	4	9	.444	4	6	.667
Mike Bryan	19	12	7	.632	0	1	4	9	.444	4	6	.667
Total	106	50	56	.472	12	19	8	35	.229	13	30	.433

Women's doubles - regular season

Player	GP	GW	GL	PCT	A	DF	BPW	BPP	BP%	3APW	3APP	3AP%
Jarmila Gajdošová	112	56	56	.500	3	8	16	39	.410	20	32	.625
Anabel Medina Garrigues	112	56	56	.500	1	3	16	39	.410	20	32	.625
Total	112	56	56	.500	4	11	16	39	.410	20	32	.625

Mixed doubles - regular season

Player	GP	GW	GL	PCT	A	DF	BPW	BPP	BP%	3APW	3APP	3AP%
Anabel Medina Garrigues	91	57	34	.626	0	0	16	32	.500	24	31	.774
Neal Skupski	80	46	34	.575	9	12	12	24	.500	22	29	.759
Mike Bryan	14	9	5	.643	1	1	2	4	.500	3	4	.750
Bob Bryan	10	6	4	.600	1	0	2	4	.500	2	2	1.000
Jarmila Gajdošová	13	4	9	.308	0	3	0	0	-	3	4	1.000
Total	104	61	43	.587	11	16	16	32	.500	27	35	.771

Team totals - regular season

Event	GP	GW	GL	PCT	A	DF	BPW	BPP	BP%	3APW	3APP	3AP%
Men's singles	114	56	58	.491	15	5	11	34	.324	10	25	.400
Women's singles	106	60	46	.566	24	19	23	52	.442	13	26	.500
Men's doubles	106	50	56	.472	12	19	8	35	.229	13	30	.433
Women's doubles	112	56	56	.500	4	11	16	39	.410	20	32	.625
Mixed doubles	104	61	43	.587	11	16	16	32	.500	27	35	.771
Total	542	283	259	.522	66	70	74	192	.385	83	148	.561

Men's singles - playoffs

Player	GP	GW	GL	PCT	A	DF	BPW	BPP	BP%	3APW	3APP	3AP%
Tennys Sandgren	9	4	5	.444	3	0	0	0	-	2	2	1.000
Total	9	4	5	.444	3	0	0	0	-	2	2	1.000

Women's singles - playoffs

Player	GP	GW	GL	PCT	A	DF	BPW	BPP	BP%	3APW	3APP	3AP%
Jarmila Gajdošová	6	1	5	.167	0	0	0	0	-	1	2	.500
Total	6	1	5	.167	0	0	0	0	-	1	2	.500

Men's doubles - playoffs

Player	GP	GW	GL	PCT	A	DF	BPW	BPP	BP%	3APW	3APP	3AP%
Tennys Sandgren	9	4	5	.444	0	0	1	1	1.000	0	1	.000
Neal Skupski	9	4	5	.444	0	0	1	1	1.000	0	1	.000
Total	9	4	5	.444	0	0	1	1	1.000	0	1	.000

Women's doubles - playoffs

Player	GP	GW	GL	PCT	A	DF	BPW	BPP	BP%	3APW	3APP	3AP%
Jarmila Gajdošová	8	3	5	.375	0	0	0	0	-	2	2	1.000
Anabel Medina Garrigues	8	3	5	.375	0	0	0	0	-	2	2	1.000
Total	8	3	5	.375	0	0	0	0	-	2	2	1.000

Mixed doubles - playoffs

Player	GP	GW	GL	PCT	A	DF	BPW	BPP	BP%	3APW	3APP	3AP%
Anabel Medina Garrigues	7	2	5	.286	0	0	0	3	.000	0	2	.000
Neal Skupski	7	2	5	.286	2	0	0	3	.000	0	2	.000
Total	7	2	5	.286	2	0	0	3	.000	0	2	.000

Team totals - playoffs

Event	GP	GW	GL	PCT	A	DF	BPW	BPP	BP%	3APW	3APP	3AP%
Men's singles	9	4	5	.444	3	0	0	0	-	2	2	1.000
Women's singles	6	1	5	.167	0	0	0	0	-	1	2	.500
Men's doubles	9	4	5	.444	0	0	1	1	1.000	0	1	.000
Women's doubles	8	3	5	.375	0	0	0	0	-	2	2	1.000
Mixed doubles	7	2	5	.286	2	0	0	3	.000	0	2	.000
Total	39	14	25	.359	5	0	1	4	.250	5	9	.556

Men's singles - all matches

Player	GP	GW	GL	PCT	A	DF	BPW	BPP	BP%	3APW	3APP	3AP%
Tennys Sandgren	123	60	63	.488	18	5	11	34	.324	12	27	.444
Total	123	60	63	.488	18	5	11	34	.324	12	27	.444

Women's singles - all matches

Player	GP	GW	GL	PCT	A	DF	BPW	BPP	BP%	3APW	3APP	3AP%
Jarmila Gajdošová	112	61	51	.545	24	19	23	52	.442	14	28	.500
Total	112	61	51	.545	24	19	23	52	.442	14	28	.500

Men's doubles - all matches

Player	GP	GW	GL	PCT	A	DF	BPW	BPP	BP%	3APW	3APP	3AP%
Tennys Sandgren	96	42	54	.438	1	7	5	27	.185	9	25	.360
Neal Skupski	96	42	54	.438	11	11	5	27	.185	9	25	.360
Bob Bryan	19	12	7	.632	0	0	4	9	.444	4	6	.667
Mike Bryan	19	12	7	.632	0	1	4	9	.444	4	6	.667
Total	115	54	61	.470	12	19	9	36	.250	13	31	.419

Women's doubles - all matches

Player	GP	GW	GL	PCT	A	DF	BPW	BPP	BP%	3APW	3APP	3AP%
Jarmila Gajdošová	120	59	61	.492	3	8	16	39	.410	22	34	.647
Anabel Medina Garrigues	120	59	61	.492	1	3	16	39	.410	22	34	.647
Total	120	59	61	.492	4	11	16	39	.410	22	34	.647

Mixed doubles - all matches

Player	GP	GW	GL	PCT	A	DF	BPW	BPP	BP%	3APW	3APP	3AP%
Anabel Medina Garrigues	98	59	39	.602	0	0	16	35	.457	24	33	.727
Neal Skupski	87	48	39	.552	11	12	12	27	.444	22	31	.710
Mike Bryan	14	9	5	.643	1	1	2	4	.500	3	4	.750
Bob Bryan	10	6	4	.600	1	0	2	4	.500	2	2	1.000
Jarmila Gajdošová	13	4	9	.308	0	3	0	0	-	3	4	1.000
Total	111	63	48	.568	13	16	16	35	.457	27	37	.730

Team totals - all matches

Event	GP	GW	GL	PCT	A	DF	BPW	BPP	BP%	3APW	3APP	3AP%
Men's singles	123	60	63	.488	18	5	11	34	.324	12	27	.444
Women's singles	112	61	51	.545	24	19	23	52	.442	14	28	.500
Men's doubles	115	54	61	.470	12	19	9	36	.250	13	31	.419
Women's doubles	120	59	61	.492	4	11	16	39	.410	22	34	.647
Mixed doubles	111	63	48	.568	13	16	16	35	.457	27	37	.730
Total	581	297	284	.511	71	70	75	194	.381	88	157	.561

== Transactions ==
- March 16, 2015: The Dream acquired Bob and Mike Bryan in a trade with the San Diego Aviators for financial consideration.
- March 16, 2015: The Dream protected Bob and Mike Bryan, chose Jarmila Gajdošová and Tennys Sandgren as new additions to the team and selected returning team members Anabel Medina Garrigues and Aisam Qureshi both of whom they had left unprotected at the WTT draft.
- March 16, 2015: The Dream left Alex Bogomolov, Jr. and Darija Jurak unprotected in the WTT Draft effectively making them free agents. Jurak was later signed by the San Diego Aviators.
- July 9, 2015: The Dream signed Neal Skupski as a roster player to replace Aisam Qureshi who withdrew from WTT for undisclosed reasons. Under WTT Rule 402C, unless Qureshi demonstrates that his withdrawal was due to an injury, he is ineligible to play in WTT for the 2016 and 2017 seasons.

== Individual honors and achievements ==
The following table shows individual honors bestowed upon players of the California Dream in 2015.

Player	Award
Anabel Medina Garrigues	Female Co-Most Valuable Player
Neal Skupski	Male Rookie of the Year

Anabel Medina Garrigues led WTT in winning percentage in mixed doubles. Jarmila Gajdošová led WTT in winning percentage in women's singles. Neal Skupski was second in WTT in winning percentage in mixed doubles.
