= Bohannon =

Bohannon is a surname. Notable people with the surname include:

- Camille Bohannon, American radio announcer and journalist
- David D. Bohannon (1898–1995) American real estate developer, primarily in the San Francisco Bay Area
- Etdrick Bohannon (born 1973), American basketball player
- Fred Bohannon (1958–1999), American football player
- Hamilton Bohannon (1942–2020), American musician and producer, often credited simply as Bohannon
- Jason Bohannon (born 1987), American basketball player
- Jim Bohannon (1944–2022), American radio show host
- John Bohannon, science journalist
- Jordan Bohannon (born 1997), American basketball player, brother of Jason
- Naz Bohannon (born 1999), American basketball and former American Football player
