= Rimrock Mall =

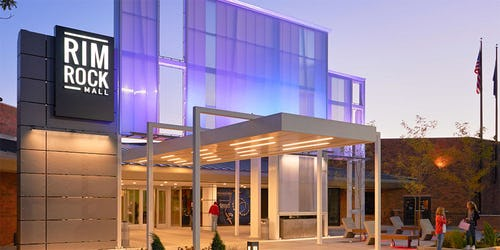
- Rimrock Mall Entrance in 2018
- Location: Billings, Montana, United States
- Coordinates: 45.7652°N 108.5776°W
- Address: 300 S 24th St W
- Opened: September 11, 1975; 51 years ago
- Developer: The Hahn Company
- Manager: Jones Lang Lasalle Properties
- Owner: JLL Properties
- Num. of stores: 88
- Num. of anchor tenants: 4
- Floor area: 575,000 square feet (53,400 m^{2})
- Floors: 1
- Parking: 3,200
- Website: rimrockmall.com

Rimrock Mall is an indoor shopping mall located in Billings, Montana, United States. It is managed by Jones Lang Lasalle. The mall is anchored by two Dillard's, Dunham Sports, and J. C. Penney.

== Overview ==
Rimrock Mall is the largest indoor mall in Billings, as well as the largest shopping center of its kind in Montana.

== History ==
=== 1970s ===
The area that is now Rimrock Mall was formerly a sugar beet farm, located in a largely undeveloped part of Billings that is now known as the West End. The mall was developed at a cost of about $15 million by The Hahn Company, and the design was done by architects with a Los Angeles-based company.

On its opening day on September 11, 1975, 10,000 cars were counted to have entered the mall, and police, along with auxiliaries with the Yellowstone County Sheriff's Office, had to direct traffic in the area.

By 1976, Montgomery Ward, Hennessy's and Herberger's were anchoring at the mall. The Denver Dry Goods Company opened at the mall in Fall 1978.

By the end of the decade, the mall became home to two theaters: Rimrock 4 (later Rimrock 5), which opened in 1975 and occupied a space inside the mall, and World West, with opened in 1979 and occupied a standalone building on the mall's premise.

=== 1980s ===
When The Denver closed in 1981, businessman Bruce Crippen persuaded JCPenney to open a new location in the space formerly occupied by The Denver, and even agreed to assume the department store's lease in its original Downtown Billings store, which still had five years remaining at the time. JCPenney officials, however, opted instead to relocate to Rimrock Mall and abandon its Downtown Billings location, and the new location opened in February 1982. This had a decidedly negative impact on the retail environment in Downtown Billings.

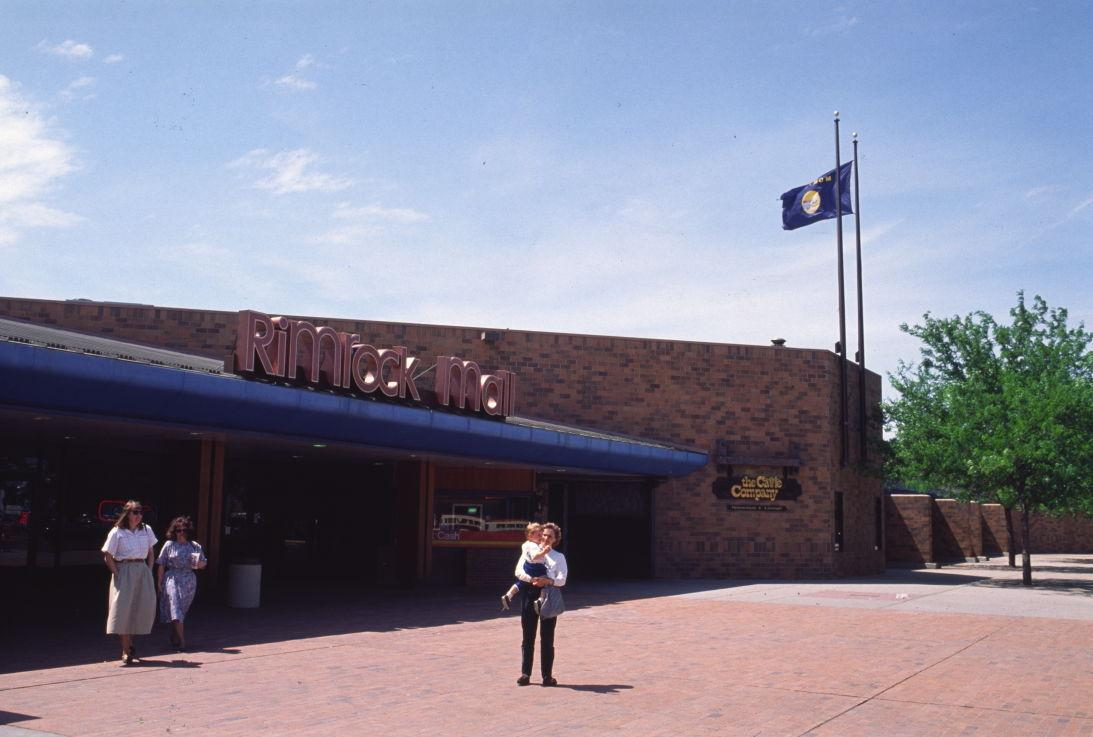
The main entrance to Rimrock Mall is seen in May 1993.

During the 1980s, the mall was seen as a big driver of development in the West End, and turned the area into a regional shopping destination for Montana and Wyoming.

=== 1990s ===
In November 1996, Macerich purchased Rimrock Mall, along with the Vintage Faire Mall in Modesto, California, for a combined $118.2 million.

Rimrock 5 closed in 1998, and the space it once occupied later became home to Scheels All Sports. Another movie theater, Wynnsong 10, opened on the mall's premise in 1999.

=== 2010s ===
In December 2012, it was reported that Macerich put the mall up for sale. About six months later, Starwood Retail Properties LLC announced a deal to purchase Rimrock Mall and Northridge Mall in Salinas, California from Macerich. Starwood Retail Partners became the operator of Rimrock Mall as a result of the deal. The value of the deal was not disclosed at the time, but Macerich disclosed in a Form 10-K filing for fiscal year 2017 that the two malls were sold for a combined $230.0 million.

In 2016, Starwood Retail Partners has redesigned the mall exterior facade, main entrance and interior in an effort to give the mall a more modern look.

In 2016, the building that once housed World West was torn down for redevelopment. The space had sat vacant for nearly 20 years due to the presence of Wynnsong 10 in its immediate vicinity, and was used by the mall as storage. In December 2017, Krispy Kreme opened in a new building that sits on the original World West site.

In 2017 H&M opened in the original Herberger's location, was divided in half. the other side is now home to Magic City Gymnastics (opened 2018). Herberger's closed in August 2018 as a part of the parent company's liquidation.

In 2025, it was announced that Dunham Sports would be opening a store in the mall. Dunham Sports decided to open their location in the former Herberger’s and Sheel’s locations. The new anchor space was combined to create a single anchor space for Dunham Sports. The store opened in September, 2025.

== Future ==
Rimrock Mall officials have started to divide some of its vacant anchors into smaller retail spaces. Since then, H&M and other stores have moved into those smaller retail spaces.

Mall officials have expressed confidence in the mall's future, saying that in northern states, indoor shopping centers like the Rimrock Mall offer people a shopping environment that is isolated from the winter cold.
