= Hillsdale Shopping Center =

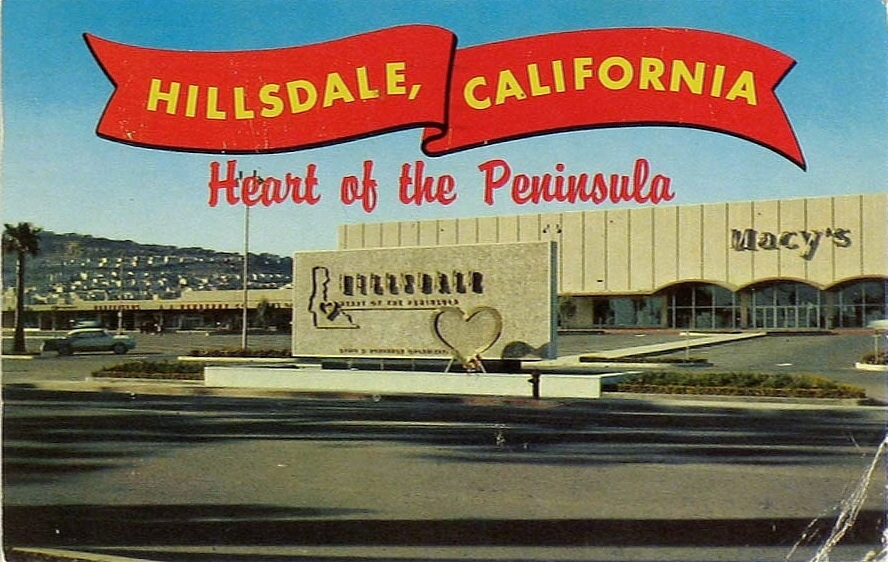
- Hillsdale as seen shortly after opening in the 1950s.
- Location: San Mateo, California, United States
- Coordinates: 37.53758°N 122.30031°W
- Address: 60 E 31st Ave
- Opened: 1954; 72 years ago
- Developer: David Bohannon
- Manager: Northwood Retail
- Owner: Bohannon Development Co.
- Architect: ELS Architecture and Urban Design
- Num. of stores: 130
- Num. of anchor tenants: 4 (2 open, 2 vacant)
- Floor area: 1,300,000 sq ft (120,000 m^{2}) (GLA)
- Floors: 2 (3 in Nordstrom, 4 in Macy's and former Sears)
- Public transit: Hillsdale; SamTrans 57, 250, 251, 256, 292, 294, 295, 397, 398, ECR, KX; AC Transit M
- Website: hillsdale.com

Hillsdale Shopping Center, or simply Hillsdale, is a shopping mall in San Mateo, California, United States, currently anchored by Macy's and Nordstrom. Featuring over 130 stores and restaurants, it is at the intersection of Hillsdale Boulevard and El Camino Real or CA-82, adjacent to the Hillsdale Caltrain Station and the former site of Bay Meadows Racetrack. It is owned by Bohannon Development Co.

== History ==
Developer David D. Bohannon acquired 848 acres (343 ha) from Burleigh H. Murray in the Beresford (later called Hillsdale) neighborhood in 1939 to 1940 and began developing the area, starting construction on the Andrew Williams Grocery Store at the corner of Hillsdale Boulevard and El Camino Real in 1941. Sears selected the Hillsdale site for one of its earliest suburban stores in 1948, and the Hillsdale Shopping Center master plan was completed in 1952; Bohannon was reportedly inspired by the recently completed Westlake Shopping Center in Daly City. In December 1954, Hillsdale Shopping Center opened as an open-air center, featuring Sears (completed in 1949) and the first suburban branch store of Macy's San Francisco, later adding Emporium in 1962. Sculptures by Benny Bufano were commissioned for the mall in the 1950s. By 1970, Hillsdale had more than 150 stores. Through the 1960s and 1970s, Hillsdale Shopping Center marked the northern end of a popular Friday night cruise route along El Camino Real for young drivers.

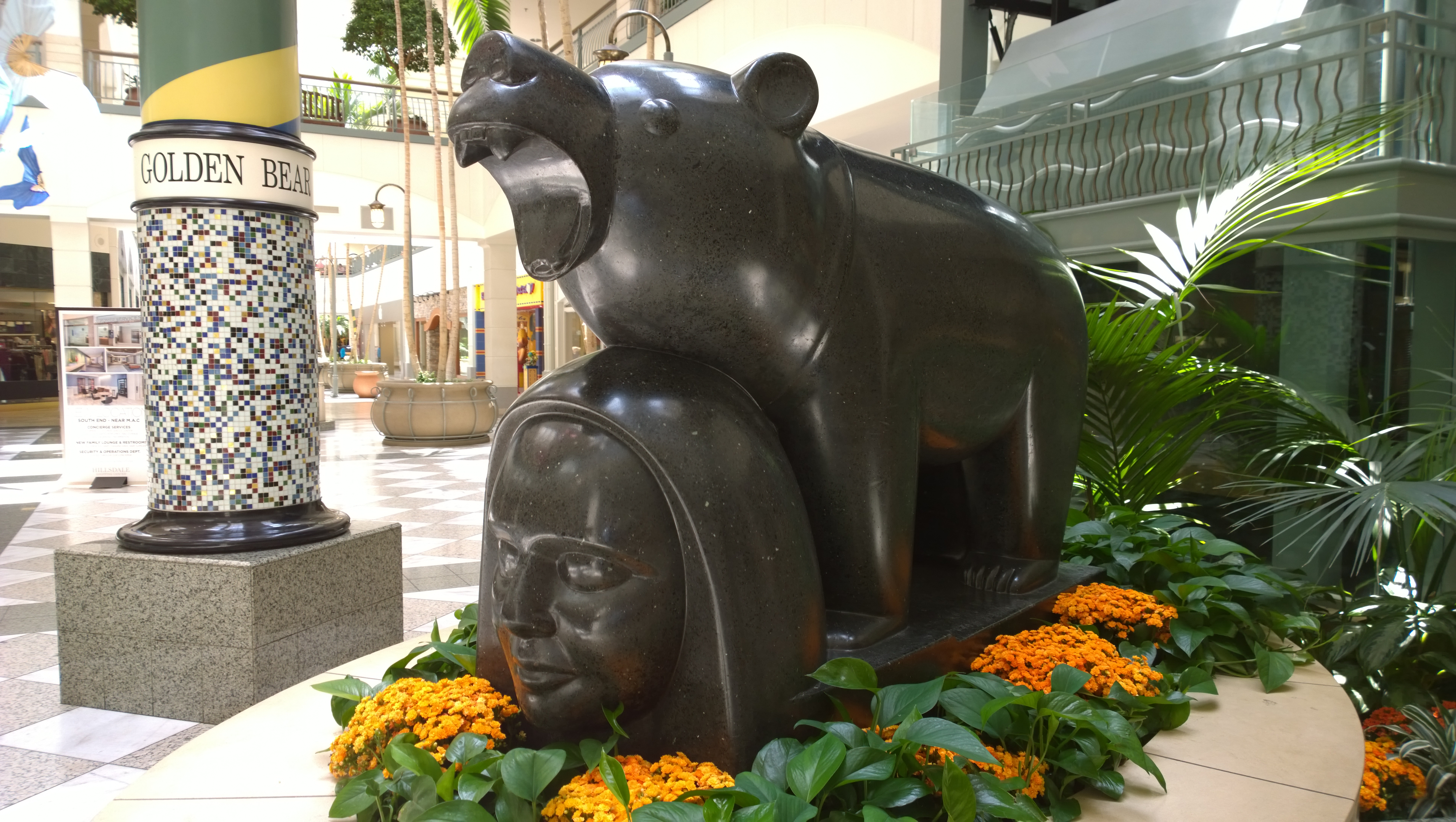
Bufano sculpture

=== Competition with Fashion Island ===
In 1982, faced with competition from San Diego–based developer The Hahn Company's San Mateo Fashion Island shopping center less than two miles to the north, Hillsdale underwent a major renovation under the leadership of Bohannon's daughter, Frances Bohannon Nelson. The outdoor shopping center was leveled and replaced with a modern two-level enclosed mall, encompassing Macy's and The Emporium along with two new anchors: Mervyn's at the mall's north end and Northern California's first Nordstrom.

Fashion Island struggled from inception and gradually lost tenants until its closure in 1996. Bridgepointe, an outdoor power center and office park, sits on the former Fashion Island site.

=== Changing anchors ===
In 1995, the merger between Emporium parent company Broadway Stores and Macy's led to the closure of the mall's Emporium anchor. Sears traded its building across from the mall for the former Emporium building, and moved into the mall proper in 1996.

The next major change for the property came in 2008 with the bankruptcy and subsequent liquidation of Mervyn's. The building was subdivided between three major tenants: The Cheesecake Factory and H&M on the building's ground floor, and Forever 21 occupying the building's second level and part of the first. The mall's Crate & Barrel store, which had opened in 1996, became outmoded with the opening of larger stores in San Francisco and Palo Alto and shuttered in 2011. Paul Martin's American Grill opened in the former Crate & Barrel in 2013.

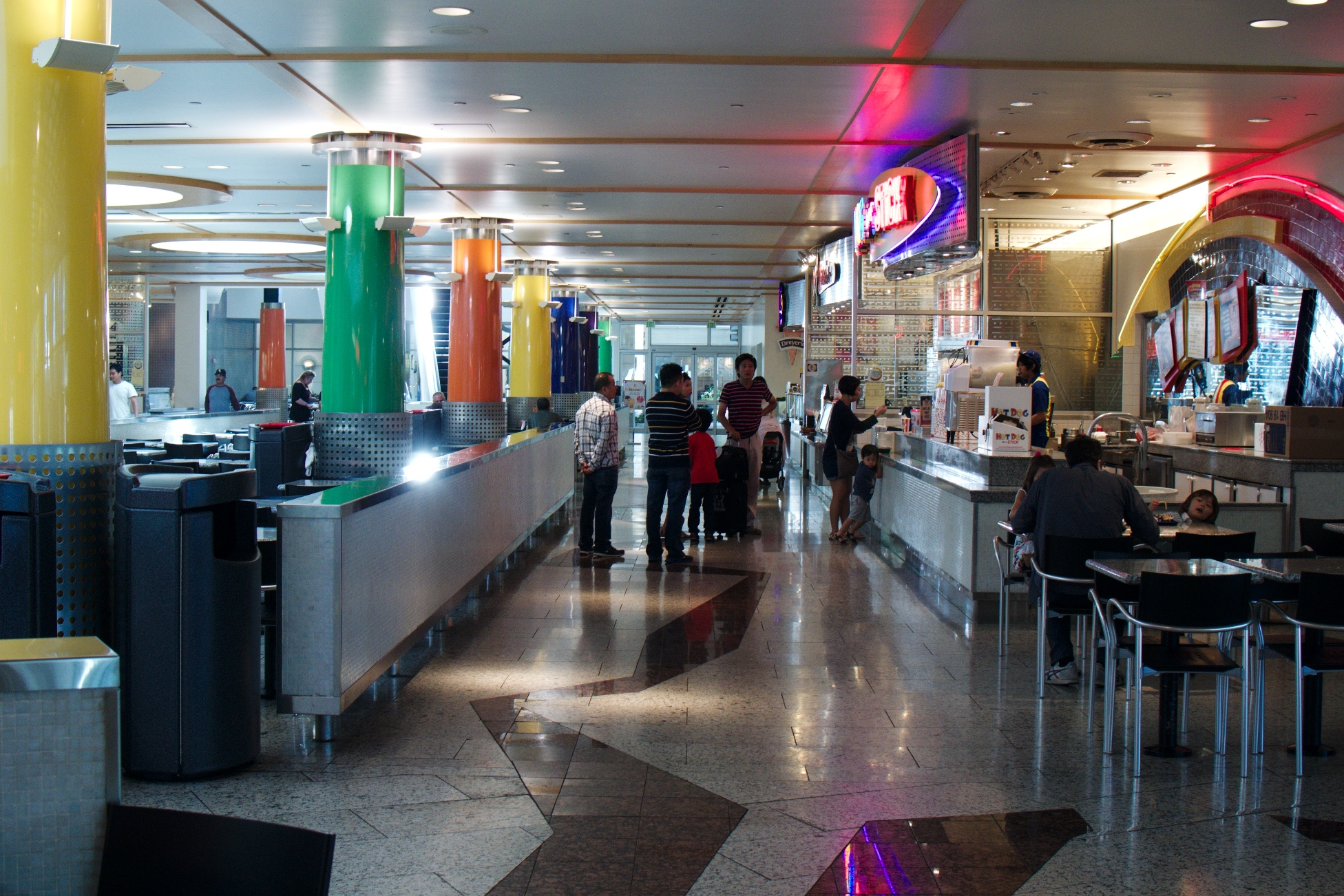
The former food court on the first level of the Sears Building north of 31st in 2014; the Sears Building was demolished in August 2016.

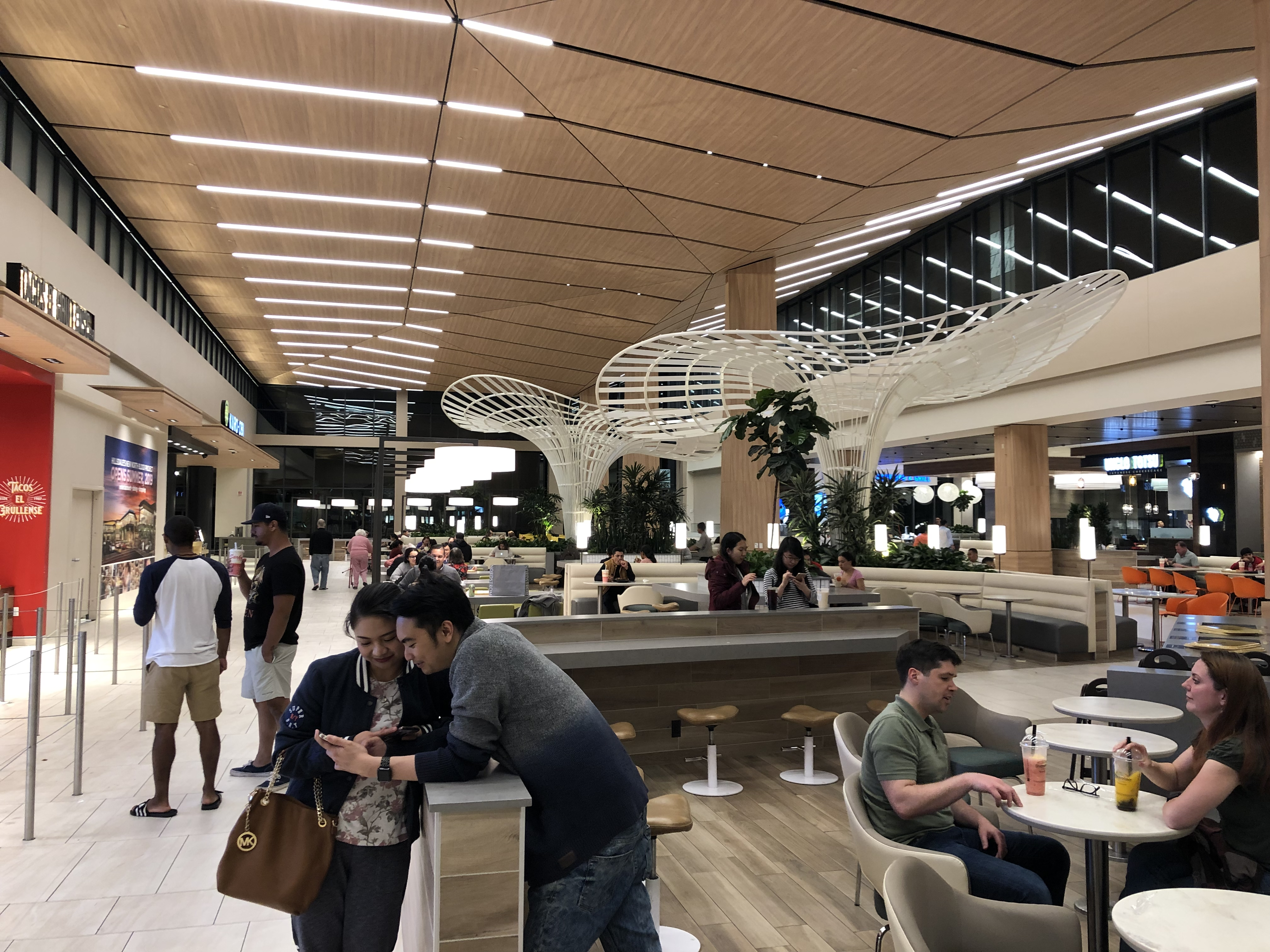
New food court, straddling 31st (2019)

=== North block reconstruction ===
The next renovation at Hillsdale started with a March 2013 planning document, filed with the city of San Mateo, detailing plans to replace Sears with a three-story 174,000-square-foot (16,200 m^{2}) Target, adding a nine-screen luxury cinema, and relocating the food court from its location in the Sears/Cost Plus Building north of 31st Street to the second-story bridge over 31st; the bridge links the north Sears Building with the main mall building between 31st and Hillsdale. The plans also included a new building at the northwest corner of El Camino and 31st, to be built when a tenant was secured. In December 2013, however, Bohannon put the proposed project on hold, citing changing market conditions. Although Sears stated they had no plans to close the store at the time, the plans were made public in 2013, the company later announced that they would close the Hillsdale store in April 2016.

Because Target pulled back from the 2013 proposal, which would have reused the existing Sears building north of 31st, it was re-imagined and re-introduced in November 2014. Also partly in response to public and official feedback, Bohannon presented a modified version of the 2013 plans in February 2015, dropping the idea of building a three-story Target in favor of a bowling alley and fitness center, as the mall sought to be an experiential destination, pivoting away from retail space, in the face of competition from online shopping. Planning officials asked Bohannon to consider incorporating housing as a mixed-use project, but a spokesman for the company said San Mateo's height restrictions made it unfeasible. The plans were approved in March 2016. Sears closed in April 2016. Demolition of the former Sears building started on August 25, 2016.

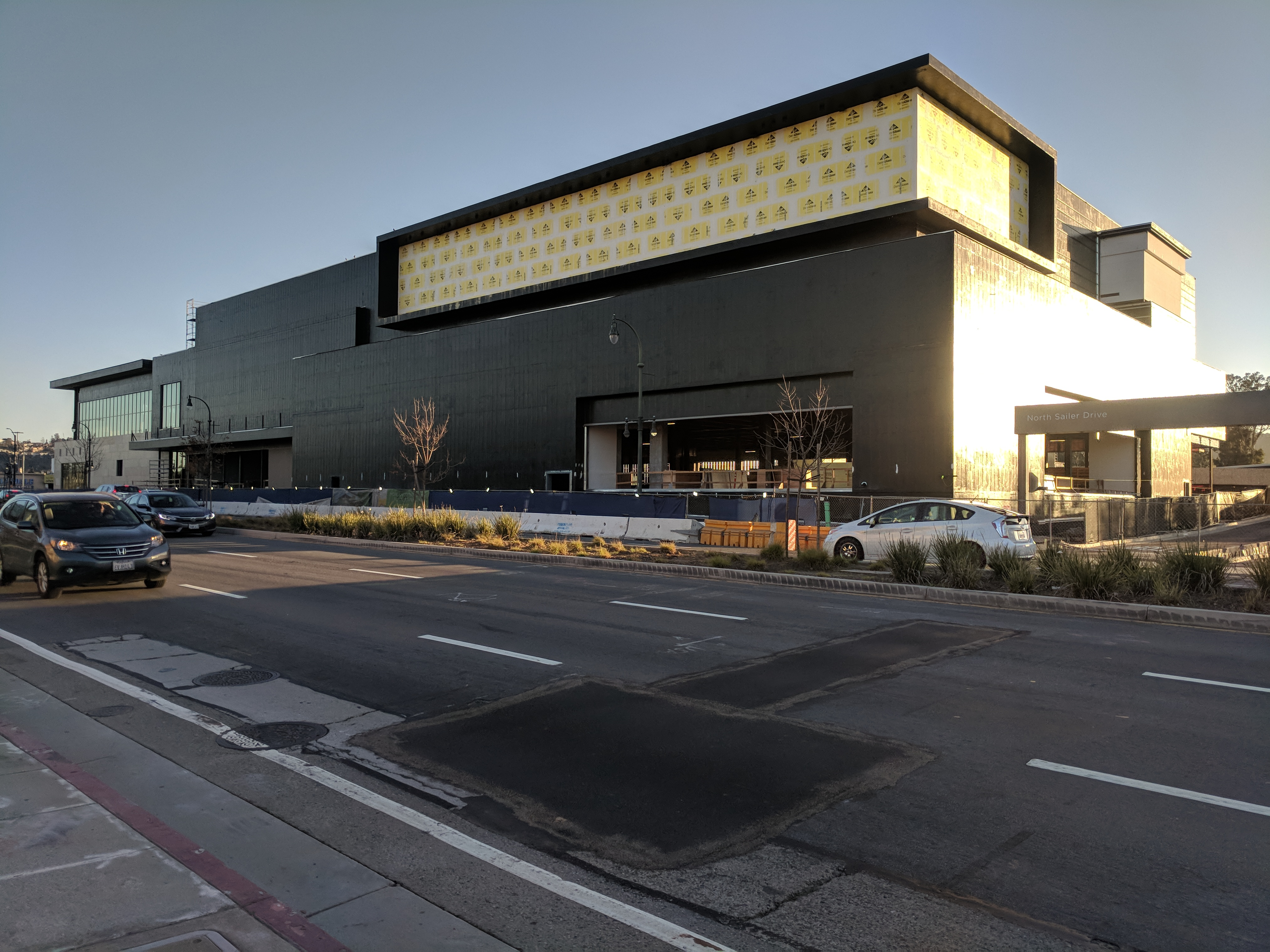
New North Block under construction (Oct 2018)

Construction on the replacement North Block buildings, which are planned to achieve LEED Gold certification, was expected to continue through fall 2018. The luxury cinema opened in late 2017. Estimated completion dates were updated to spring 2019 in March 2018, with the new dining area opening on November 17, 2018.

Hillsdale remained independently owned by the Bonhannon family until late 2021, when real estate firm Northwoods Investors took a stake in the property with the intent of remaking the mall into a mixed-use project.

== Anchors ==
- Macy's (246,175 sq ft (22,870.4 m^{2}))
- Nordstrom (150,000 sq ft (14,000 m^{2}))

=== Former anchors ===
- Mervyn's (80,000 sq ft (7,400 m^{2})) – closed in October 2008
- Sears (206,000 sq ft (19,100 m^{2})) – closed in April 2016
