= The Hahn Company =

Defunct American shopping center developer

- Company type: Private (1958–1972); Public (1972–1980); Subsidiary (1980–1998)
- Industry: Retail and office
- Founded: 1958; 68 years ago
- Founder: Ernest W. Hahn
- Defunct: 1980 (as an independent entity); 1998 (brand)
- Fate: Acquired by Trizec Corporation in 1980; liquidated and split into The Rouse Company and Westfield Group in 1998
- Successors: Trizec Properties (1998–2006); GGP (Brookfield Properties); Unibail-Rodamco-Westfield
- Headquarters: San Diego, California, United States
- Products: Shopping malls; Office buildings
- Parent: Trizec Corporation (1980–2006)

The Hahn Company, also known as Ernest W. Hahn, Inc., was a major American shopping center owner and developer from the 1950s to the 1980s, based in San Diego, California. Purchased by the Trizec Corp. in 1980 (which then took the name TrizecHahn), it became defunct.

== History ==
The company was founded and managed by Ernest W. Hahn (1919–1992). During its 30 years of existence. the company built 45 shopping malls in 18 states, from Florida to Oregon. Their first major project was the regional shopping mall La Cumbre Plaza in Santa Barbara, California, which opened in 1967. Hahn went on to become the largest mall builder in the Western United States.

The innovative Horton Plaza mall in downtown San Diego, which opened in 1985, helped lead the rejuvenation of the city's downtown area. It was the first successful downtown retail center since the rise of suburban shopping centers decades earlier. Hahn had previously built the Fashion Valley and Parkway Plaza malls in San Diego.

In 1980, Trizec Corporation, of Toronto, Ontario, acquired the company's shopping center interests. Trizec took the new name TrizecHahn to reflect the purchase. TrizecHahn exited the shopping center business in 1998. The majority of its properties west of Las Vegas were acquired by Westfield America, Inc. (precursor to The Westfield Group) and those east of Las Vegas by the Rouse Company.

== Projects and investments ==
- La Cumbre Plaza (1967) - Santa Barbara, California
- Valley Plaza Mall (1967) - Bakersfield, California
- Montclair Plaza (1968) - Montclair, California
- Fashion Valley Mall (1969) - San Diego, California
- Galleria at Tyler (1970) - Riverside, California
- Downtown Plaza (1971; portions of the mall were demolished in 2014 and later redeveloped) - Sacramento, California
- Los Cerritos Center (1971) - Cerritos, California
- Sunrise Mall (1971) - Citrus Heights, California
- Westfield Oakridge (1971) - San Jose, California
- Fashion Place (1972) - Murray, Utah
- Parkway Plaza (1972) - El Cajon, California
- Laguna Hills Mall (1973) - Laguna Hills, California
- Puente Hills Mall (1974) - Industry, California
- The Shops at Santa Anita (1974) - Arcadia, California
- Mt. Shasta Mall (1975) - Redding, California
- Rimrock Mall (1975) Billings, Montana
- Newmarket North Mall (1975; redeveloped as NetCenter in 2000) - Hampton, Virginia
- Westfield Culver City (1975) - Culver City, California
- Pueblo Mall (1976) - Pueblo, Colorado
- Capital Mall (1977) - Olympia, Washington
- Hawthorne Plaza Shopping Center (1977) - Hawthorne, California
- Redlands Mall (1977) - Redlands, California
- Vintage Faire Mall (1977) - Modesto, California
- Westfield UTC (1977) - University City, San Diego, California
- Meadows Mall (1978) - Las Vegas, Nevada
- The Oaks Mall (1978) - Thousand Oaks, California
- Santa Maria Town Center (1978) - Santa Maria, California
- Westdale Mall (1979; demolished in 2014 and is currently under redevelopment) - Cedar Rapids, Iowa
- Mesa Mall (1980) - Grand Junction, Colorado
- Ogden City Mall (1980; demolished in 2002 and redeveloped as The Junction) - Ogden, Utah
- Plaza Pasadena (1980; demolished in 1999 and redeveloped into The Paseo in 2001) - Pasadena, California
- Santa Monica Place (1980) - Santa Monica, California Jointly developed with The Rouse Company. Now an outdoor mall.
- Clackamas Town Center (1981) - Clackamas, Oregon
- The Courtyard (1981; redeveloped into Promenade on the Peninsula in 1999) - Rolling Hills Estates, California
- San Mateo Fashion Island (1981; demolished in 1996 and redeveloped into Bridgepointe Shopping Center in 1997) - San Mateo, California
- Fashion Show Mall (1981) - Paradise, Nevada
- Mall of Memphis (1981; demolished in 2004) - Memphis, Tennessee
- Solano Town Center (1981) - Fairfield, California
- Long Beach Plaza (1982; demolished in 2000 and redeveloped into Long Beach City Place in 2003) - Long Beach, California
- The Shops at Palm Desert (1982) - Palm Desert, California
- Santa Rosa Plaza (1983) - Santa Rosa, California
- The Village at Corte Madera (1985) - Corte Madera, California
- Horton Plaza (1985) - San Diego, California
- Mershops North County (1986) - Escondido, California
- Westfield Valley Fair (1986) - Santa Clara, California
- Bridgewater Commons (1988) - Bridgewater, New Jersey
- East Hills Mall (1988) - Bakersfield, California
- Sierra Vista Mall (1988) - Clovis, California
- Towson Town Center (1991 expansion wing) - Towson, Maryland
- Prudential Center (1993) - Boston, Massachusetts
- Park Meadows (1996) - Lone Tree, Colorado
- Prizm Outlets (1998) - Primm, Nevada
- Miracle Mile Shops (2000) - Paradise, Nevada
- Ovation Hollywood (2001) - Hollywood, California
