= Sunrise Mall (Citrus Heights, California) =

Shopping mall in Sacramento County, US

Coordinates: 38.67497°N 121.26901°W

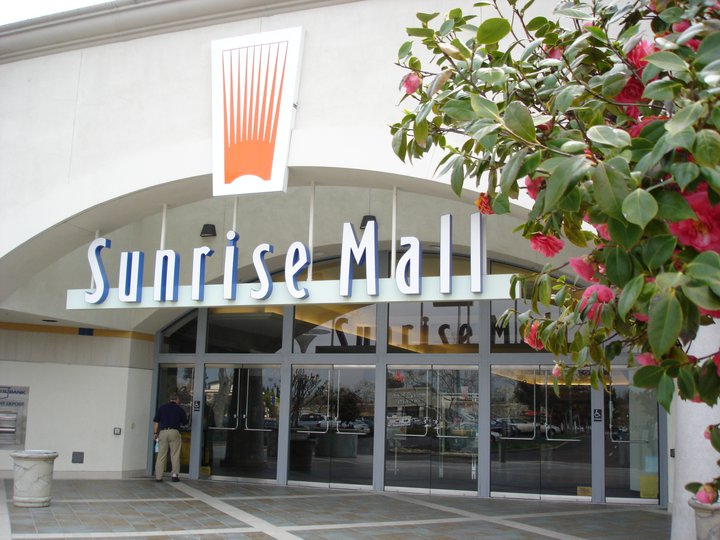
- Location: Citrus Heights, California
- Opened: April 19, 1972
- Developer: Ernest W. Hahn, Inc.; James J. Cordano Sr.
- Owner: Namdar Realty Group
- Architect: Burke, Koper, Nicholi and Archuleta
- Num. of stores: 51
- Num. of anchor tenants: 1
- Floor area: 1,100,000 square feet (100,000 m^{2})
- Floors: 1 (2 in JCPenney, 3 in both former Macy's locations and former Sears)

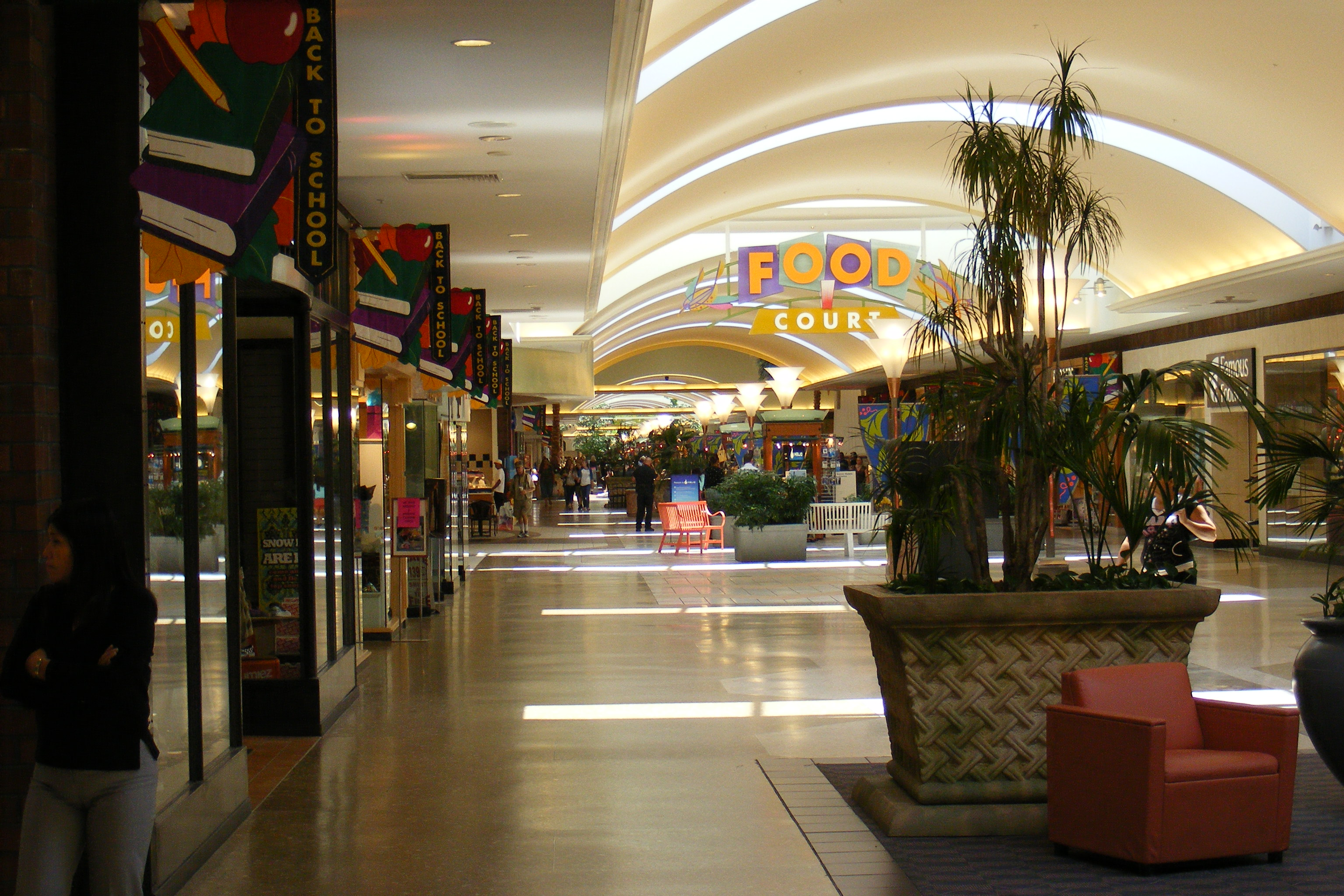
Interior view looking in the direction of the food court

Sunrise Mall is a single-level regional shopping mall located at the intersection of Sunrise Boulevard and Greenback Lane in Citrus Heights, California, United States. It is anchored by JCPenney, with two vacant anchor locations formerly occupied by two Macy's. An anchor space formerly occupied by Sears was partly leased to Slick City Action Park in 2026.

At the time of its opening on April 19, 1972, Sunrise Mall was the largest shopping center in Sacramento County and the largest commercial complex in Greater Sacramento.

== History ==
=== Development ===
Sunrise Mall is a regional shopping mall in Citrus Heights, California. It was developed by H&C Associates, a partnership between shopping center contracting firm Ernest W. Hahn, Inc., and James J. Cordano Sr., who developed Florin Mall and Country Club Plaza in Sacramento County, California. Plans for Sunrise Mall were announced by Cordano on Florin Mall's opening day in February 1968. Sunrise Mall occupies 96 acres (39 ha) of land on the southeast corner of Greenback Lane and Sunrise Boulevard. It was built enclosed, air-conditioned, and landscaped, and a 6,500 car capacity parking lot was paved. The project cost $40 million to develop.

Constructed in 1971, Sunrise Mall was the first four-department store regional shopping center to be developed as a unit in Northern California. At the time of its opening, it was Sacramento County's largest shopping center and the largest commercial complex in Greater Sacramento. Reporting published by The Sacramento Bee measured the property at 1,270,000 square feet (118,000 m^{2}) and 1,280 feet (390 m) long.

Sunrise Mall opened in 1972 in multiple phases with four anchor tenants: the Sacramento-based chain Weinstock's, JCPenney, Sears, and Liberty House. The first store to open was the three-story, 163,000-square-foot (15,100 m^{2}) Weinstock's on February 14, anchoring the north end of the mall. Sunrise Mall held its grand opening on April 19, during which the two-story, 229,000-square-foot (21,300 m^{2}) JCPenney opened, along with 36 tenants, which were mostly located on the northern two-thirds of the complex. The two-story, 286,000 square feet (26,600 m^{2}) Sears, which included an auto service center and a basement level, opened on the south end of the mall during a second grand opening held on August 30. Liberty House, a $9 million, three-story, 180,000-square-foot (17,000 m^{2}) store, opened on the west side of the mall on October 18. The four anchor tenants were owned separately from the rest of Sunrise Mall.

In September 1972, the 50 percent ownership held by Ernest W. Hahn, Inc., was purchased by a limited partnership of Sacramento investors, titled Sunrise Mall Associates and organized by Miller & Richards Investments.

=== Operations ===
The opening of Sunrise Mall encouraged residential and commercial development in the surrounding area, including new shopping centers. Birdcage Walk, an open-air shopping complex also developed by Hahn, opened across the street in April 1977, and Fountain Square, also open-air, opened on Greenback Lane in November 1977.

In January 1984, Liberty House's parent company, Amfac, Inc., announced that the chain's west coast outlets would be sold off in response to $68 million in losses in 1983. The Sunrise Mall location was one of three Sacramento stores to close, with its final day of operations on June 20, 1984. The anchor space, among other former Liberty House locations across California, was taken over by Macy's, which at the time had a five-year-old store in Birdcage Walk. Together, the two locations operated as a single store and the second largest in Macy's California division, with Macy's Sunrise housing women's apparel and the two-story Macy's Birdcage selling menswear and other goods. Macy's Sunrise opened on September 28, 1984. Macy's Birdcage moved operations to Sunrise Mall in 1996, taking over the Weinstock's location after its parent company, Broadway Stores, was sold in 1995 to Federated Department Stores, Macy's parent company.

In 1999, around the same time the Galleria at Roseville opened, James J. Cordano Company conducted the first major interior renovation Sunrise Mall. Costing $10 million, updates included new flooring and skylights. According to James Cordano Jr., sales at Sunrise Mall "took a dip when the Roseville Galleria first opened" but rose by 2005. In 2007, a 500-seat food court with a fireplace was added in the corridor between JCPenney and Macy's Men's & Home.

In 2015, Sears Holdings spun off 235 of its properties, including the Sears at Sunrise Mall, into Seritage Growth Properties. In November of the same year, Spinoso Real Estate Group acquired the mall from Steadfast Companies.

In July 2018, the Sears store was shuttered as part of the closure of 24 stores nationwide. The mall was purchased by Namdar Realty Group in December 2018.

In March 2025, the two Macy's stores closed as part of a closure of 66 stores nationwide, which also included a longtime store nearby at the Downtown Commons in Downtown Sacramento. As of March 2025, the owner was seeking a buyer for the mall.

In May 2026, it was announced that entertainment center franchise Slick City Action Park signed a lease to open in part of the former Sears anchor space. The new entertainment center is planned to have a size of around 31,000 square feet (2,900 m^{2}) and would be the flagship location.

=== World TeamTennis ===
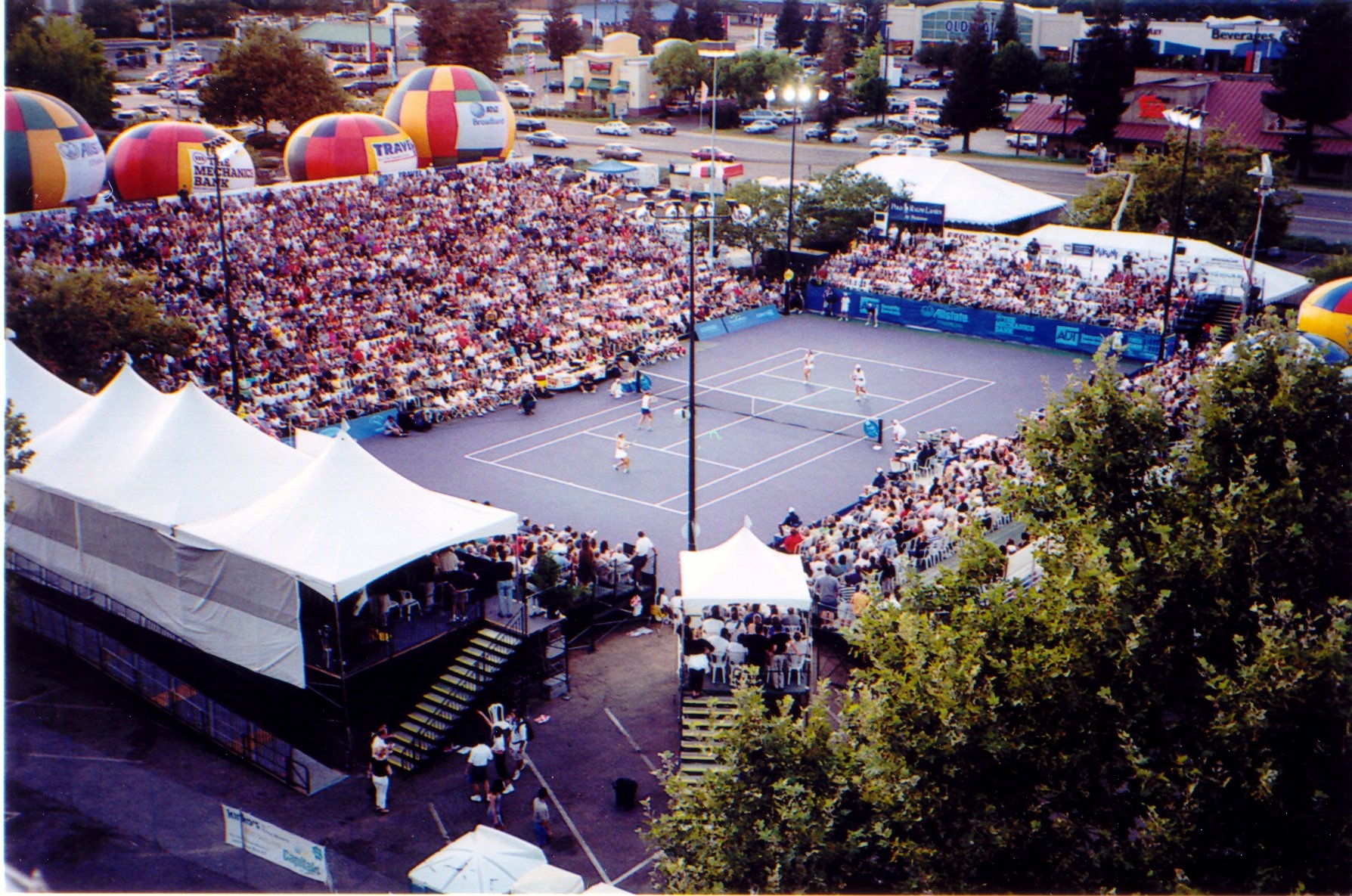
Overhead view of a Sacramento Capitals match

In 2002, the Sunrise MarketPlace, Sunrise Mall, and the Sacramento Capitals tennis team formed a partnership that brought six World TeamTennis championships to Sacramento. A stadium was set up in the mall's parking lot.

On February 23, 2015, WTT announced that a new ownership group had taken control of the Texas Wild and moved the team to Sunrise Mall, renaming it the California Dream. The franchise was terminated in January 2016 by WTT due to noncompliance with the league.

== Architecture ==
The Los Angeles-based architectural firm Burke, Koper, Nicholi and Archuleta designed Sunrise Mall during its construction, dubbing the architectural theme of the complex "nature in Abstract". The mall opened with dark exterior walls. Oak trees decorated the parking lot and entrances, estimated to be half a century or older in age; these trees were retained from the property when it was purchased. Inside, sidewalks were constructed out of brick and wood, and planting-seating areas were installed. The sculptured, lighted ceiling, described by Charles Johnson of The Sacramento Bee as being "deeply coffered" with "geometric lighting panels", flooded the mall with light. Johnson described Sunrise mall as a "marked improvement over the Carnival approach of older commercial centers". In additions to sculptures created by the mall's architects, other art installations were commissioned, including hanging anodized aluminum rods created by John Lilly and a steel sculpture in front of JCPenney created by Jerome Kirk. The landscape architect for the mall was Lawrence Reed Moline from Los Angeles.

Jon Jerde, the director of design, stated in a public relations release that his role was to coordinate the architecture of the mall's four anchor tenants, which were designed by different architects. The Weinstock's anchor was a repeat of a previous design by architectural firm Charles Luckman and associates, with wall coverings made of wood, plastic fabric, and tile, and carpeting covered over 90% of the floor space. The JCPenney store was designed by Eddie and Paynter of Fresno, California, and opened with walls of river rock and curved concrete forms. The Sears anchor was designed by Los Angeles-based architectural firm Parkin Architects, Engineers, Planners. The tenant opened with white walls set against red brick on the exterior. Inside, the structure was designed with pyramidal aluminum and colored, plexiglass canopies. The Liberty House anchor was designed by architect Avner Naggar, who developed the basic structure and exterior, and architectural firm Chaix and Johnson, which planned the interior. The building opened with no display windows and mannequins in four moving display capsules, made of glass and bronzed steel, traveled between the first and third floors. The interior had a combination of "sun and earth colors", according to The Sacramento Bee. Reflecting on the mall's development while planning Vintage Faire Mall in Modesto, California, Ernest W. Hahn later called Sunrise Mall "a mess because each large store insisted on its own architectural exterior".

== See also ==
- Arden Fair – Mall in Sacramento, California
