= Bridgepointe Shopping Center =

- Location: San Mateo, California, U.S.
- Coordinates: 37.5599°N 122.2817°W
- Address: 3000 Bridgepointe Parkway
- Opened: May 2, 1982; 44 years ago, in 1999 (as Current outdoor strip Bridgepoint shopping center)
- Closed: 1996 (original San Mateo Fashion Island)(current outdoor strip plaza was still open)
- Demolished: 1999 (original San Mateo Fashion Island)
- Previous names: San Mateo Fashion Island, The Island
- Developer: The Hahn Company
- Manager: CBRE Group
- Owner: CBRE Group
- Architect: Charles Kober and Associates
- Num. of stores: 100+ (San Mateo Fashion Island)
- Num. of anchor tenants: 4 (San Mateo Fashion Island)
- Floor area: 844,000 square feet (78,400 m^{2}) (San Mateo Fashion Island); 572,000 square feet (53,100 m^{2}) (Bridgepointe Shopping Center)
- Floors: 1

Bridgepointe Shopping Center is a shopping mall in San Mateo, California, United States. Opened in 1982 as San Mateo Fashion Island, it was originally an enclosed shopping mall featuring JCPenney, Bullock's, Liberty House, and Montgomery Ward as its anchor stores. Following the closures of Bullock's and Liberty House, the mall went into decline throughout the 1990s, leading to its closure and demolition in favor of a power center. Bridgepointe Shopping Center is owned and managed by CBRE Group. Major tenants of Bridgepointe Shopping Center include The Home Depot and Target.

== History ==
The Hahn Company, a California-based shopping mall developer, announced plans to build San Mateo Fashion Island in 1980. The developers chose a site along the California State Route 92 freeway in San Mateo, California. The site chosen for the mall was previously a muddy field, which presented challenges in construction. In response to this, the engineering firm of Ruthroff and Engelkirk built piling foundations under each structure so as to allow "flexibility" to the structure. Plans called for a 844,000 square feet (78,400 m^{2}), one-story shopping mall with four anchor stores. These would be national chains Montgomery Ward and JCPenney, along with California-based chain Bullock's and Hawaii-based Liberty House. The mall also employed a number of architects: Charles Kober and associates for the mall itself, Environmental Planning and Research for the Montgomery Ward and Bullock's stores, Millard Archuleta for the JCPenney store, and Chaix and Johnson for Liberty House. Overall, it would have over 140 stores. In relation to the mall's development, developers including Menlo Development and Trammell Crow Company announced plans to build adjacent residential and office complexes.

The mall was formally opened on May 2, 1982. In addition to the four anchor stores, other amenities upon opening included an ice skating rink, a food court, and a multiplex movie theater. In 1984, Liberty House closed nine of its ten California stores due to restructuring after poor sales the previous year. The only one to remain open was the Fashion Island store.

=== Decline ===
By 1986, Hahn Company had put the mall up for sale due to underperformance. Factors in this underperformance included the Teflon-coated "fabric roof" of the Bullock's store which, combined with problems in the store's ventilation system, created issues with the store's internal temperature. In addition, construction along Highway 92 made the mall difficult to access. Hahn had attempted to sell the mall to DeMonet Industries, but was unable to negotiate a sale price. Later that year, Federated Department Stores (now Macy's, Inc.) closed the Bullock's location and sold it to real estate developer Sterlik Company, which converted 84,000 square feet (7,800 m^{2}) of the 130,000-square-foot (12,000 m^{2}) store into a sporting goods store called All American Sports Club. Furthering the mall's failure was the expansion of nearby Hillsdale Shopping Center throughout the 1980s. In 1987, Terranomics Development of San Francisco, California, purchased a 25 percent stake in the mall. Also as part of this deal, Amfac, then-owners of the Liberty House location, closed the store in order to sell its lease to Hahn.

Terramonte renamed the mall to The Island and sold the vacated Liberty House location to Whole Earth Access, a counterculture retailer based in Berkeley, California, in July 1987. All American Sports Club filed for bankruptcy and closed all of its stores in 1989. JCPenney left the mall in 1991, thus leaving two of the mall's four anchor stores vacant once more. Between this and the fact that Whole Earth Access did not open to the mall, the interior quickly experienced a decline in tenancy. By 1993, the center was over 80 percent vacant; among the major stores that had closed were Oshman's Sporting Goods, Foot Locker, and Pier One Imports. In response to this, Hahn proposed to replace the center with outlet stores, but was unsuccessful in negotiating with any prospective retailers. Retail analyst Arthur Krakower told the San Francisco Examiner in 1993 that factors leading to the mall's decline included the loss of department stores, combined with an excess of shopping malls built in the 1980s.

=== Redevelopment ===
Sand Hill Properties of San Mateo bought the mall in 1995 and announced plans to begin renovation. By this point, the only remaining tenants were the ice skating rink, theater, Montgomery Ward, and an arcade called Tilt! Sand Hill announced plans to tear the mall down in favor of a power center, which filed a lawsuit against Sand Hill for breach of contract. San Mateo city council approved a plan in September 1996 for developers to demolish the entire structure except for the ice skating rink. In its place would come an outdoor shopping center anchored by Target. This would open by late 1997.

After being rebuilt, it was renamed as Bridgepointe Shopping Center. Other major tenants have included The Home Depot, Toys R Us (now Hobby Lobby), Staples (now Ross Dress For Less), Petco, Bed Bath & Beyond (closed since 2021), Marshalls, Cost Plus World Market, and Sports Authority (now Total Wine & More). Overall, the center experienced few changes until the ice rink was closed in 2013. Bridgepointe Shopping Center is owned and managed by CBRE Group. It consists of over 572,000 square feet (53,100 m^{2}) of retail space. Target and Home Depot remain among the major tenants.
