= Meadows Mall =

Coordinates: 36°10′21″N 115°11′46″W

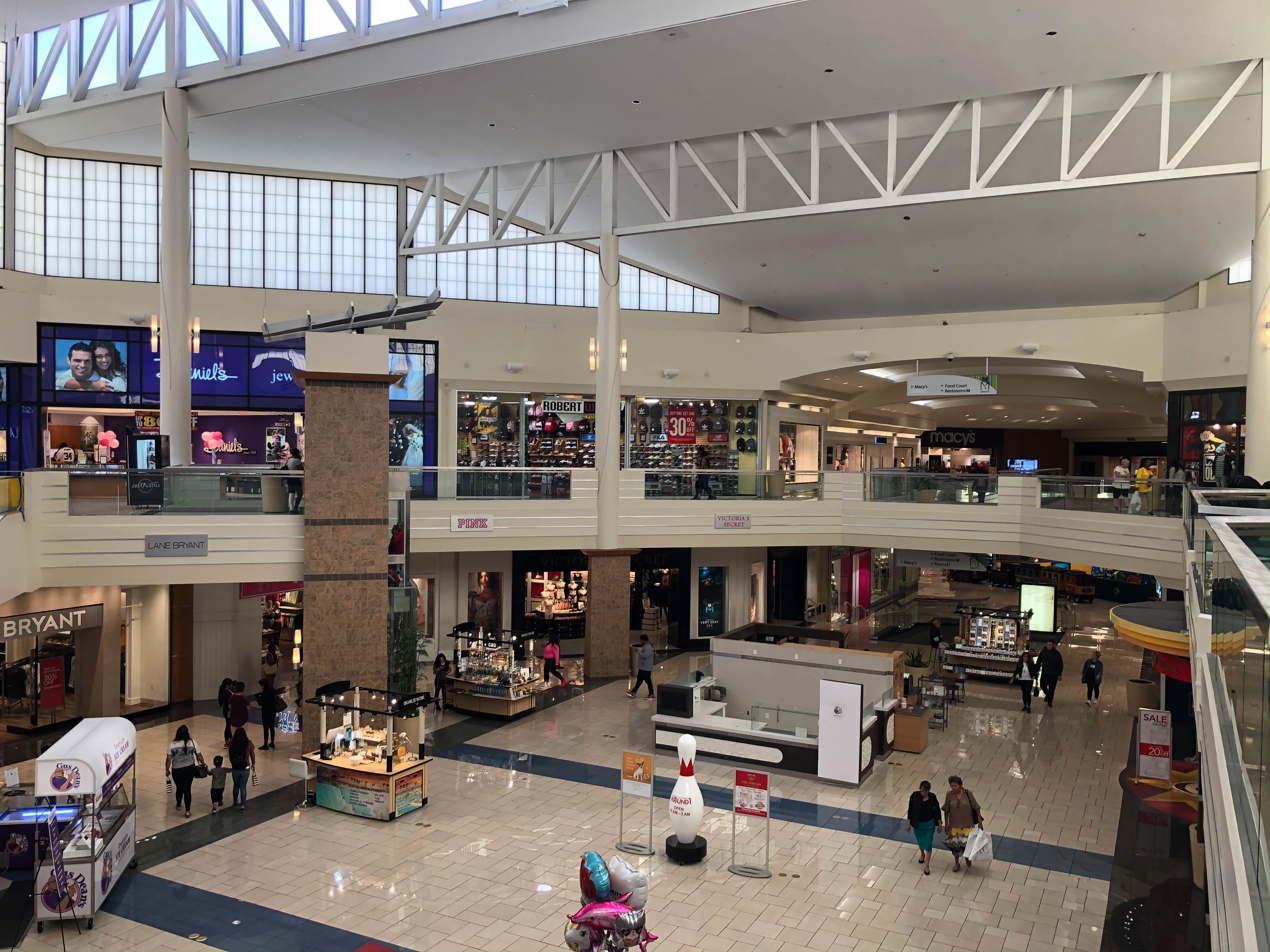
- Meadows Mall in 2020
- Location: Las Vegas, Nevada
- Address: 4300 Meadows Lane
- Opened: August 5, 1978; 48 years ago
- Developer: The Hahn Company and Dayton-Hudson Corporation
- Manager: GGP
- Owner: GGP
- Architect: Charles Kober & Associates
- Num. of stores: 118
- Num. of anchor tenants: 6
- Floor area: 945,000 ft^{2}
- Floors: 2 (3 in Macy's)
- Parking: ~4,600
- Website: www.meadowsmall.com

Meadows Mall is a shopping mall in Las Vegas, Nevada on 84 acres (34 ha). It is a two-story enclosed mall with 945,000 ft^{2} of space. It has 122 stores and 6 anchor tenants: Curacao, Nellis Auction Outlet, Round One, a Dillard's clearance outlet, JCPenney, and Macy's. The mall is surrounded by nearly 4,600 surface parking spaces.

Meadows Mall was proposed in 1973, but the start of construction was delayed several years by the city, which objected to its location. The mall was developed by Dayton-Hudson Corporation and built by Ernest W. Hahn Inc. It opened on August 5, 1978, as the city's second major indoor shopping center, joining The Boulevard Mall. Ownership of Meadows Mall has changed several times; General Growth Properties purchased it in 1998, and launched a major renovation in 2003.

== History ==
Dayton-Hudson Corporation (now Target Corporation) began planning Meadows Mall in 1973. That year and again in 1974, the Las Vegas City Commission voted against the mall as some members felt that the project should be moved to a better location. In early 1974, Dayton-Hudson won a district court order which required the city to grant a necessary zoning variance. The city commission appealed to the Nevada Supreme Court, which ruled in 1975 that the city must grant the variance.

The mall was designed by architectural firm Charles Kober & Associates, which chose desert colors and tones for the building. Groundbreaking took place in May 1976, and construction took more than two years, with Ernest W. Hahn Inc. as the general contractor. More than 1,200 people worked on the mall during construction. The project cost $40 million to build, and its exterior included 156,000 bricks. The project added a new city street known as Meadows Lane.

Meadows Mall opened on August 5, 1978, at a time when The Boulevard Mall was the city's only other major indoor mall. Meadows Mall was expected to employ approximately 3,000 people. Its name is derived from the English word for Las Vegas: Meadows. A month after the opening, Dayton-Hudson announced that the mall would be sold as part of corporate downsizing. In 1979, it was sold to Shell Pension Fund, based in The Hague, Netherlands. It was managed by Center Companies, based in Michigan. International Income Property purchased the mall in 1986, for $60 million.

In December 1993, the mall was temporarily evacuated after a teenage boy made bomb threats with what turned out to be a fake bomb. The mall received a renovation in 1995, which included the expansion of its Dillard's store. Later that year, the executive director of the Las Vegas Indian Center criticized the mall's carousel for featuring a carving of an American Indian head on the back of one of the ride's horses, calling it "culturally offensive". In 1996, an indoor no-smoking policy was instituted due to customer requests. A partial renovation took place in 1997, and included a new overflow parking lot added near the mall's JCPenney store. The mall also designated parking spaces near its entrances as "Stork Parking," reserved for expectant mothers.

General Growth Properties (GGP) acquired Meadows Mall in May 1998. At that time, it contained 951,000 sq ft (88,400 m^{2}). Within a year, the company had increased mall occupancy to 95 percent. In June 2003, GGP began a multimillion-dollar renovation that would include brighter indoor lighting, tile flooring, a new color scheme, a new stone facade, exterior paint, and enhanced landscaping, as well as three new escalators and upgrades to the food court. The company felt that the mall, with its dated 24-year-old presentation, needed a contemporary look to compete. It remained open during renovations, with most of the work being done during night hours.

With 99 percent of the renovations complete, the mall celebrated its grand reopening on November 21, 2003, with a ribbon-cutting ceremony that morning, followed by live jazz performances and a live children's show featuring Strawberry Shortcake. Several new stores had been added during the renovations, which included new bathrooms and a revamping of the food court. The mall contained 947,370 sq ft (88,014 m^{2}) at the time. In conjunction with Valley Hospital Medical Center and the Summerlin Hospital, the Meadows Mall added the 1,640 sq ft (152 m^{2}) Healthy Living Play Area in November 2004, as a way to educate children about healthy lifestyles.

In December 2004, a man was arrested on eight counts of illegally accessing people's credit card accounts after falsely telling them that he was a millionaire family member of the non-existent Meadows family, who he claimed were the owners of the mall. On March 9, 2007, the mall remained open during a police and SWAT search for a suspect who fled inside after a traffic stop.

In 2015, the Las Vegas Review-Journal reported, "With regional shopping centers proliferating, the Meadows is becoming an odd mall out — the shopping center without a distinct personality or demographic segment. As a result, retail experts say, the mall faces a crossroads at which it must soon chart a new direction." Vegas Inc. reported that despite the 2003 renovation, "it looks like a typical mall from the '90s." Las Vegas Weekly also found its progress stagnant compared to other area malls, but noted its central location and wealth of nearby residents, stating that it is nearly occupied with stores and shoppers.

Meadows Mall is frequently used as an early voting site during elections.

== Tenants ==
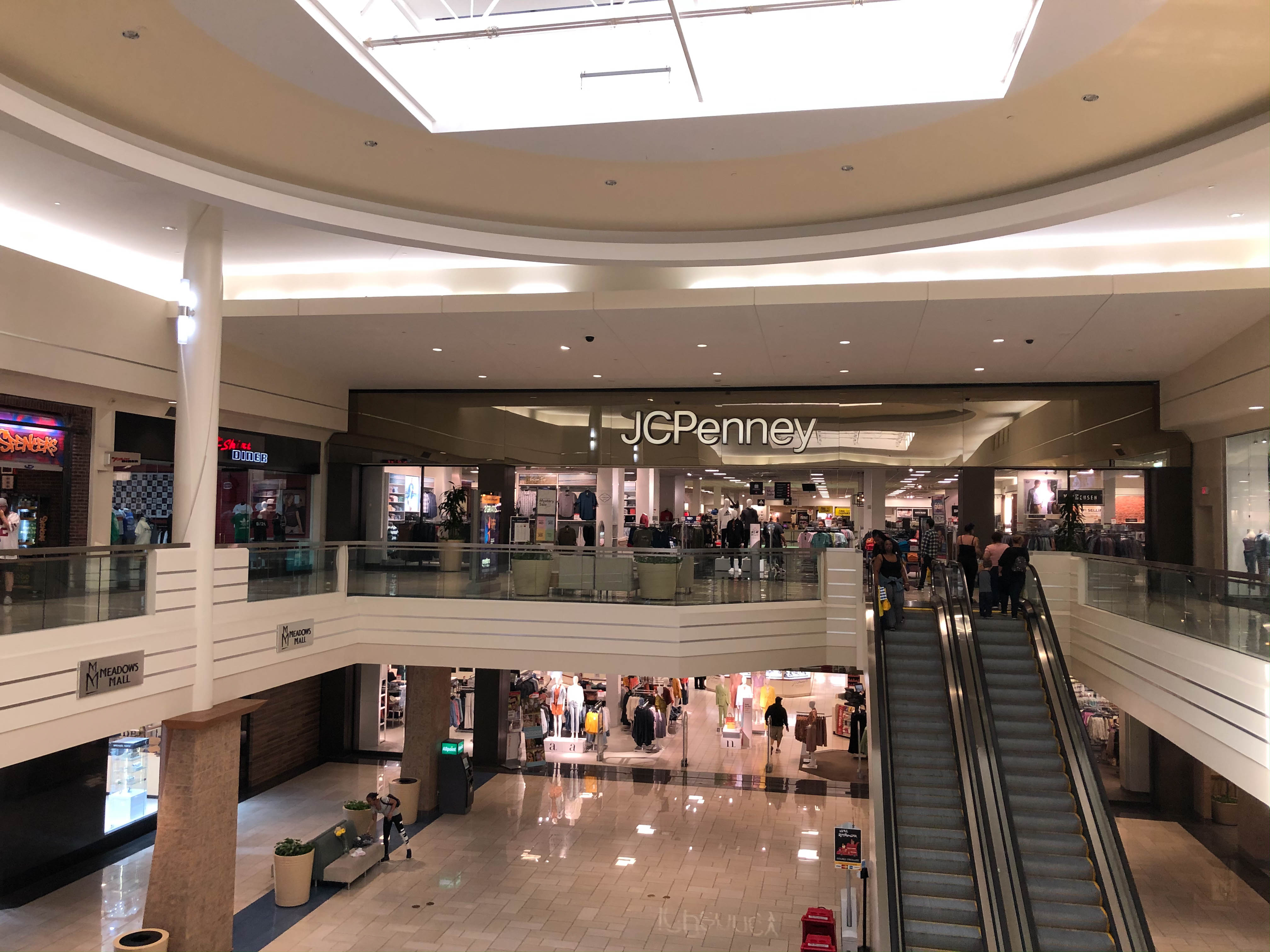
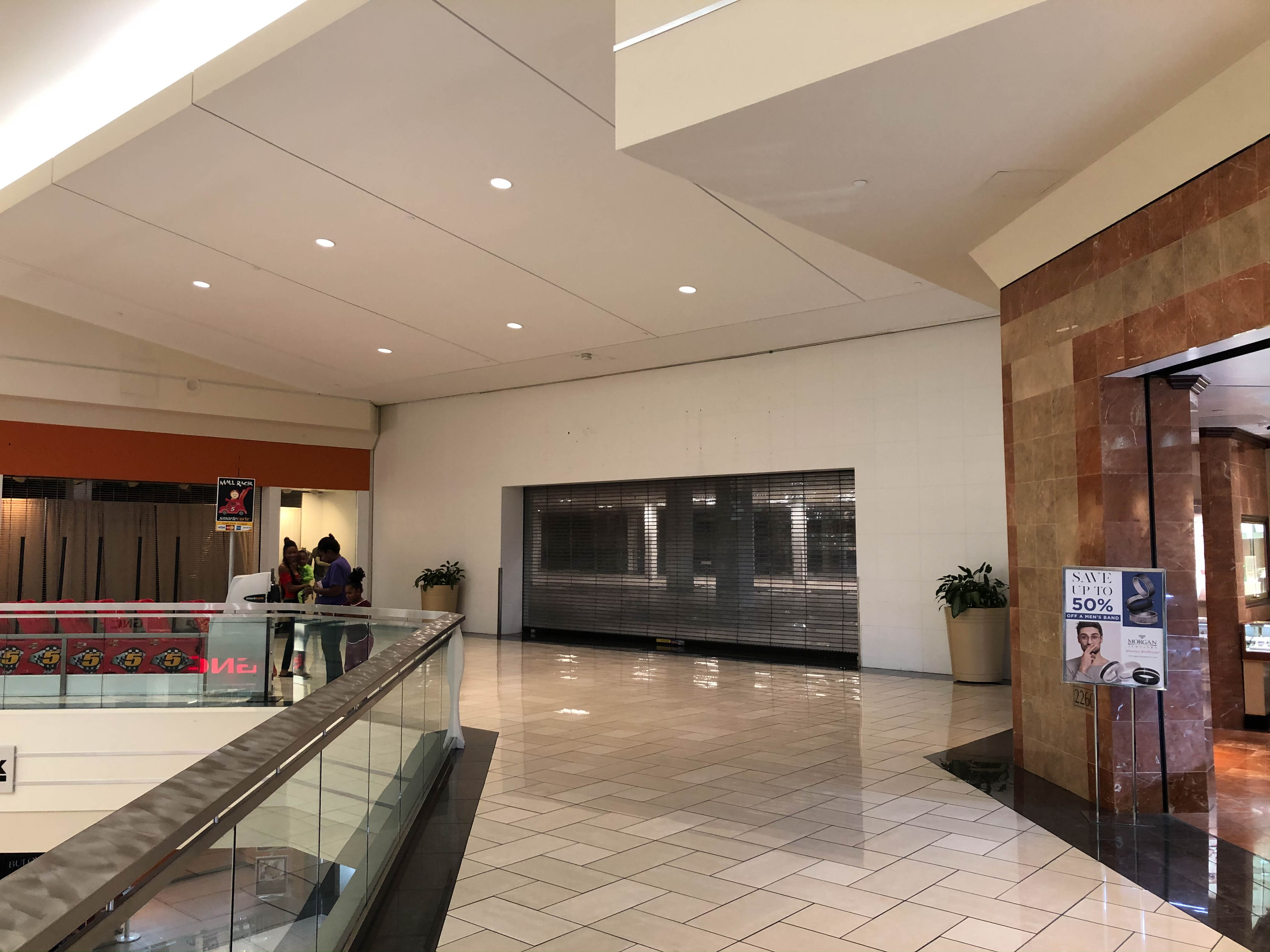
JCPenney and the closed Sears store in 2020

Meadows Mall included 7,600 parking spaces and two anchor stores upon opening: Diamond's and The Broadway. Sears and JCPenney stores opened in 1979, completing the mall. The Sears store cost $3 million to construct, and measured 150,000 sq ft (14,000 m^{2}). Dillard's opened in 1984, and The Broadway rebranded in 1996 as Macy's. As of 1997, the mall was composed of 123 stores, and included one restaurant and a 14-vendor food court. Tomfoolery, a 24-hour restaurant and bar with five slot machines, opened on the second floor in April 2005.

In 2014, Dillard's closed the 100,000 sq ft (9,300 m^{2}) first floor of its 180,000 sq ft (17,000 m^{2}) store, and converted its second floor into a clearance outlet for unsold merchandise from other Dillard's stores. Curacao opened in Dillard's vacant first-floor space in October 2016, and attracted 40,000 customers on its opening day. In June 2018, Macy's opened an off-price store-within-a-store known as Macy's Backstage.

In August 2018, Round One announced plans to open an arcade and entertainment center inside the mall. Part of the Sears first floor was leased to Round One for the new project, which also called for the demolition of the closed Sears Auto Center. After a year, Round One fast-tracked its plans to get the project opened. The 42,000 sq ft (3,900 m^{2}) anchor tenant opened on November 2, 2019. That month, Sears announced the closing of the Meadows Mall location, part of a plan to close 51 stores nationwide. The store closed on February 3, 2020. In the 2020s, after Sears closed, Nellis Auction Outlet opened up utilizing the former Sears. The store opened utilizing the entire upper level of the former Sears and the store sells a wide variety of merchandise in the space.
