= Vintage Faire Mall =

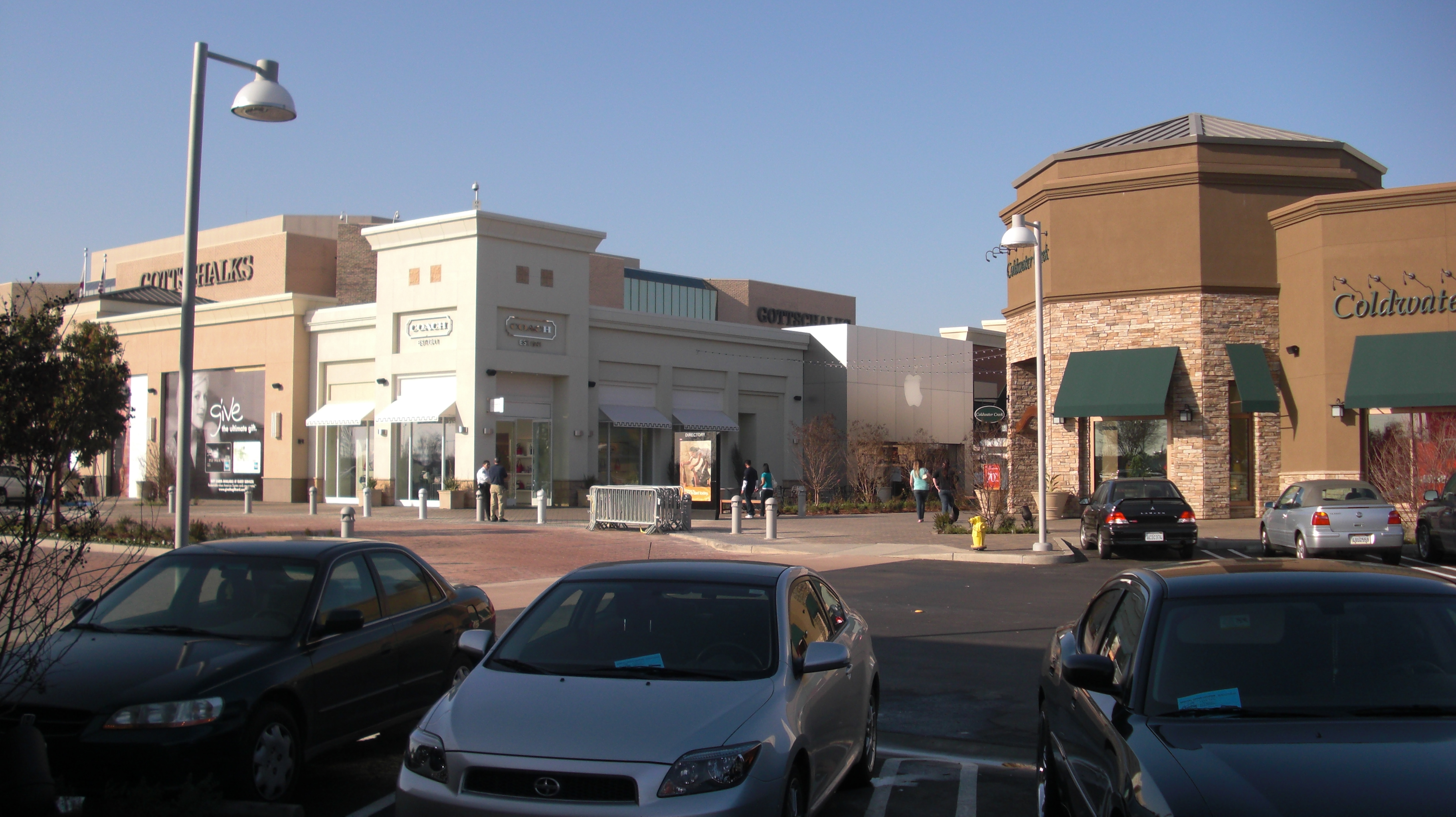
- The Village at Vintage Faire Mall entrance, 2009
- Location: Modesto, California
- Coordinates: 37.68868°N 121.05401°W
- Address: Intersection of Sisk Road, Dale Road, Standiford Avenue and State Route 99
- Opened: March 12, 1977; 49 years ago
- Developer: The Hahn Company
- Manager: Macerich
- Owner: Macerich
- Architect: Eddy, Paynter, and Renfroe
- Num. of stores: 174
- Num. of anchor tenants: 5
- Floor area: 1,083,309 sq ft (100,642.7 m^{2})
- Floors: 2 (3 in Furniture City)
- Parking: 1,000+
- Website: shopvintagefairemall.com

Vintage Faire Mall is a regional shopping mall located in Modesto, California, United States. It is owned and operated by Macerich and is adjacent to State Route 99. The mall is a hub for StanRTA bus service.

== History ==
=== Development ===
Vintage Faire Mall was developed by the Hahn Company, which proposed an unnamed regional shopping center on 83 acres (34 ha) of land east of State Route 99 at Beckwith Road, in between Modesto and Salida. The planned mall would serve a population area which included Modesto, Turlock, Sonora, and Merced, as well as the southern portion of San Joaquin County. To tie in with the proposed development, the company pushed for Highway 99 to be converted into freeway status. The California Highway Commission accepted $1 million from the company in 1973 to advance the priority of the project, which would widen the highway from two to three lanes and construct an interchange at Beckwith Road. The deadline for the freeway project was extended five months to September 1976 due to environmental review and legal challenge from environmentalists, who opposed the loss of farmland.

Ernest W. Hahn of the Hahn Company secured approval from the Modesto Planning Commission in January 1973. The proposal for the shopping center, referred to as the "Modesto Mall" in drafting plans, was priced at $45 million. Hahn received a $28.3 million interim construction loan from New York-based Manufacturers Hanover Trust Company. Once construction was complete, $6 million was made available to certain tenants for interior finishing. After a contest to name the center held in 1974, the name "Village Faire Mall" was selected due to mall's proximity to the vineyards of the San Joaquin Valley.

Initial plans for the mall included three large and two junior department stores as anchor tenants around a two-level, enclosed shopping mall, similar in preliminary design to Hahn's recently completed Sunrise Mall in Sacramento, California. Around 130 shops were planned in units ranging from 800 square feet (74 m^{2}) to 10,000 square feet (930 m^{2}), with 67 stores on the lower level and 68 on the upper. A 1,800 square feet (170 m^{2}) community room was constructed on the upper level. Lease rates were about three times the standard in Modesto at the time, according to The Modesto Bee.

Construction on Village Faire Mall began in August 1974. In the first of a series of grading permits, the north end of the shopping center, the site of a parking lot, was elevated 18 feet (5.5 m) above grade with 719,500 cubic yards (550,100 m^{3}) of dirt in a $1.3 million contract. Work on the mall structure began in September 1975. The planned opening was delayed by a year to spring 1977 due to delays in the State Route 99 project.

Department stores JCPenney and Sears moved from their stores in downtown Modesto, and Weinstock's and Gottschalks established full-line stores, with Gottschalks filling one of the junior tenant spaces. For the mall's fifth anchor tenant, negotiations were held with Dunlaps and Liberty House but ultimately cooled off. Macy's expressed interest.

Sears and Weinstock's built and owned their stores, while the Gottschalks and JCPenney anchors were built and leased by the Hahn Company. Sears constructed a two-level, 150,000-square-foot (14,000 m^{2}) building, including an attached auto service center, on 13 acres (5.3 ha); Weinstock's constructed a three-level, 161,000-square-foot (15,000 m^{2}) building on 13 acres (5.3 ha). Both stores included parking lots in their parcels. The unit leased to JCPenney was a two-level, 174,000-square-foot (16,200 m^{2}) building on 2.5 acres (1.0 ha), and Gottschalks occupied a two-level, 88,000-square-foot (8,200 m^{2}) store. The fifth store was constructed later.

The mall was designed by architects Eddy, Paynter, and Renfroe, based in Bakersfield, California. Reflecting on the development of Sunrise Mall, Ernest W. Hahn later called it "a mess because each large store insisted on its own architectural exterior". Paynter said to The Modesto Bee that trying to the convince the larger department stores to maintain a architecturally uniform exterior was difficult "since each management has definite ideas about how they want their stores to look". For Vintage Faire Mall, the exterior, including the department store anchors, was uniform in appearance, with light cocoa-colored brick and off-white and beige trim. A bank, savings institution, and movie theater were planned as satellite tenants.

=== Operations ===
Vintage Faire Mall opened in March 1977.

In 2001, the mall's owner Macerich invested $10 million in an extensive renovation that included new escalators, new railings and carpet on the second floor, new tiles on the first floor, modern light fixtures and new exterior signage. A new elevator was built in the center of the mall and a wing of the second floor was converted into a food court.

In 2008, the mall opened an expansion that added a new outdoor "lifestyle center" to the former parking lot space between a mall entrance and what was previously Forever 21. The new expansion, called "The Village at Vintage Faire Mall", added several new retailers.

In 2015, Sears Holdings spun off 235 of its properties, including the Sears at Vintage Faire Mall, into Seritage Growth Properties.
