= Rusch Botanical Gardens =

Botanical garden in Citrus Heights, California, US

Coordinates: 38°42′30″N 121°17′58″W

The Rusch Botanical Gardens 2 acres (8,000 m^{2}) are located at 7801 Auburn Boulevard in Citrus Heights, California, United States within Rusch Park. The Rusch Home site dates back to 1858. Originally Gardens were laid out in 1916. Now gardens are a State Site of Historical Interest. Gardens open daily, dawn to dusk.

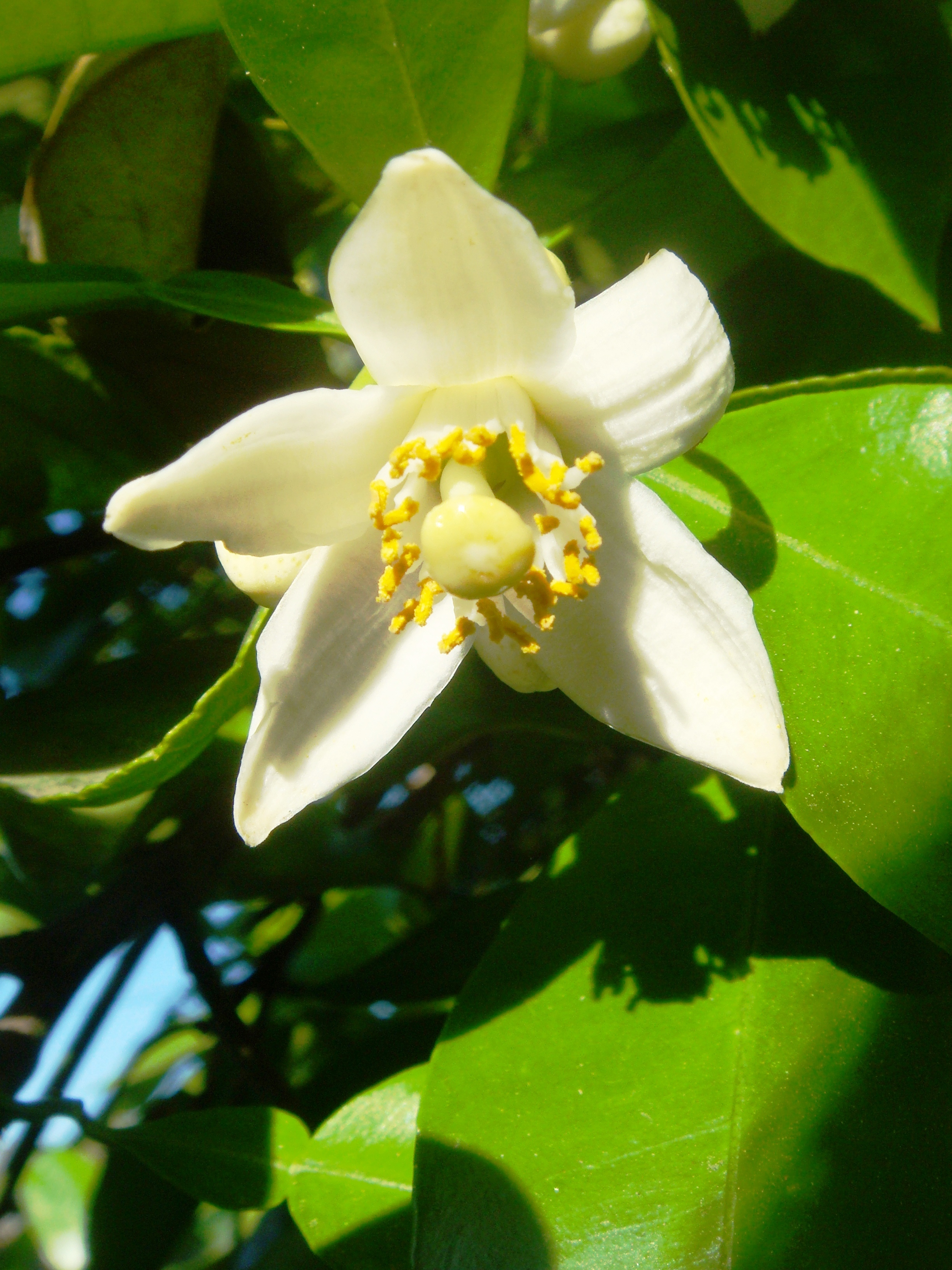

== Collection ==
Gardens represent seven biomes of California and are featuring rose, herb, citrus, and African plants.

== See also ==
- List of botanical gardens in the United States
