= David D. Bohannon =

American architect

David Dewey Bohannon
- Born: 23 March 1898; San Francisco, California, United States
- Died: 13 March 1995 (aged 96)

David Dewey Bohannon was a home builder and contractor in the San Francisco Bay Area, founder of the David D. Bohannon Organization. His firm built the Hillsdale Shopping Center, San Lorenzo Village (the first large-scale master planned community in Alameda County), and many other projects in San Mateo, Alameda County, and across the Bay Area. He built over 25,000 homes in the Bay Area in the 1930s and 1940s. Mr. Bohannon became one of the biggest developers of whites-only housing throughout the San Francisco Bay Area in the mid-20th century, with significant responsibility for the segregated landscape that persists.
