= Citrus Heights, California =

City in California, United States

- City
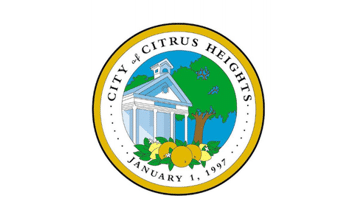
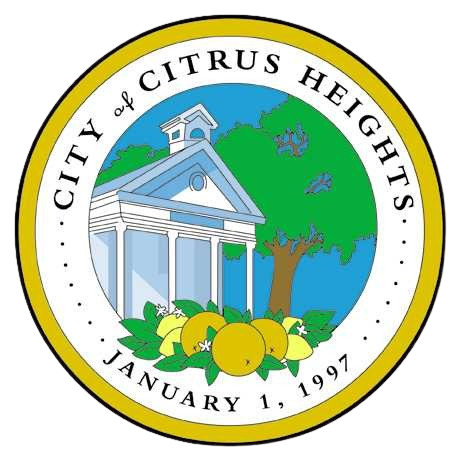
- Flag Seal Logo
- Interactive map of Citrus Heights, California
- Location in the United States
- Coordinates: 38°42′N 121°17′W
- Country: United States
- State: California
- County: Sacramento
- Incorporated: January 1, 1997

Government
  - Mayor: MariJane Lopez-Taff

Area
  - Total: 14.22 sq mi (36.82 km^{2})
  - Land: 14.22 sq mi (36.82 km^{2})
  - Water: 0 sq mi (0.00 km^{2}) 0%
- Elevation: 167 ft (51 m)

Population (2020)
  - Total: 87,583
  - Rank: 96th in California
  - Density: 6,160.7/sq mi (2,378.65/km^{2})
- Time zone: UTC-8 (PST)
  - Summer (DST): UTC-7 (PDT)
- ZIP codes: 95610, 95611 (PO Box only), 95621
- Area code: 916, 279
- FIPS code: 06-13588
- GNIS feature ID: 1655900
- Website: www.citrusheights.net

Citrus Heights is a city in Sacramento County, California, United States. As of the 2020 census, Citrus Heights had a population of 87,583, up from 83,301 at the 2010 U.S. census.

== History ==
Citrus Heights voters approved a ballot measure to incorporate as a city on November 5, 1996, effective January 1, 1997. The measure passed, with 62.5% of the votes. The city incorporated on January 2, 1997 (January 1 according to the official city website), becoming the fifth city in Sacramento County. Originally, the community was called Sylvan, but in 1910, a real estate agent bought the area, split it into 10-acre (4.0 ha) lots, and renamed it Citrus Heights.

== Geography ==
According to the United States Census Bureau, the city has a total area of 14.22 square miles (36.8 km^{2}), all land.

=== Climate ===
Citrus Heights has a climate that is characterized by mild winters and dry hotter summers. The area usually has a low humidity and the average temperature throughout the year is 68 Fahrenheit, with the daily average ranging from 45° in December and January to 76° in July. Average daily high temperatures range from 53° in December and January to 93° in July. Average daily low temperatures range from 38° to 58°. The average year has 73 days with a high over 90°, with the highest temperature on record being 114° on July 17, 1925, and 18 days when the low drops below 32°, with the coldest one day record being December 11, 1932, at 17°.

Average yearly precipitation is 24.61 inches according to weather.com (, 2018). Almost no rain falls during the summer months (less than 1%), and over 80% falls between November and March. 3.47", 3.39", 4.46", and 4.34" per month respectively, though rainfall can be much greater than average. On average, 96 days in the year have fog, mostly in the morning, primarily in December and January. Typically, Citrus Heights enjoys 268 sunny days throughout the year.

== Demographics ==
Historical population
Census	Pop.	Note	%±
1970	21,760		—
1980	85,911		294.8%
1990	107,439		25.1%
2000	85,071		−20.8%
2010	83,301		−2.1%
2020	87,583		5.1%
2025 (est.)	86,348	▼	−1.4%
U.S. Decennial Census

Citrus Heights is part of the Sacramento metropolitan area.

=== Racial and ethnic composition ===
Citrus Heights city, California – Racial and ethnic composition Note: the US Census treats Hispanic/Latino as an ethnic category. This table excludes Latinos from the racial categories and assigns them to a separate category. Hispanics/Latinos may be of any race.
Race / Ethnicity (NH = Non-Hispanic)	Pop 2000	Pop 2010	Pop 2020	% 2000	% 2010	% 2020
White alone (NH)	67,809	60,438	56,474	79.71%	72.55%	64.48%
Black or African American alone (NH)	2,334	2,542	3,191	2.74%	3.05%	3.64%
Native American or Alaska Native alone (NH)	678	507	516	0.80%	0.61%	0.59%
Asian alone (NH)	2,344	2,577	3,507	2.76%	3.09%	4.00%
Pacific Islander alone (NH)	245	325	403	0.29%	0.39%	0.46%
Other race alone (NH)	158	124	510	0.19%	0.15%	0.58%
Mixed race or Multiracial (NH)	2,964	3,054	5,806	3.48%	3.67%	6.63%
Hispanic or Latino (any race)	8,539	13,734	17,176	10.04%	16.49%	19.61%
Total	85,071	83,301	87,583	100.00%	100.00%	100.00%

=== 2020 census ===
As of the 2020 census, Citrus Heights had a population of 87,583 and a population density of 6,160.9 inhabitants per square mile (2,378.7/km^{2}). The racial makeup of Citrus Heights was 68.9% White, 3.9% African American, 1.2% Native American, 4.2% Asian, 0.5% Pacific Islander, 8.3% from other races, and 13.0% from two or more races. Hispanic or Latino of any race were 19.6% of the population.

The median age was 38.6 years. The age distribution was 20.7% under the age of 18, 8.4% aged 18 to 24, 28.8% aged 25 to 44, 24.1% aged 45 to 64, and 18.1% who were 65 years of age or older. For every 100 females, there were 93.6 males, and for every 100 females age 18 and over there were 90.4 males age 18 and over.

The census reported that 99.3% of the population lived in households, 0.6% lived in non-institutionalized group quarters, and 0.2% were institutionalized. 100.0% of residents lived in urban areas, while 0.0% lived in rural areas.

There were 34,532 households, out of which 28.6% included children under the age of 18. Of all households, 41.6% were married-couple households, 9.1% were cohabiting couple households, 18.9% had a male householder with no spouse or partner present, and 30.3% had a female householder with no spouse or partner present. About 27.1% of households were made up of individuals, and 13.1% had someone living alone who was 65 years of age or older. The average household size was 2.52. There were 21,782 families (63.1% of all households).

There were 35,928 housing units at an average density of 2,527.3 units per square mile (975.8 units/km^{2}). Of those units, 96.1% were occupied and 3.9% were vacant. Of occupied units, 57.6% were owner-occupied and 42.4% were occupied by renters. The homeowner vacancy rate was 1.0%, and the rental vacancy rate was 4.5%.

=== 2023 ACS estimates ===
In 2023, the US Census Bureau estimated that the median household income was $77,167, and the per capita income was $36,645. About 5.9% of families and 9.8% of the population were below the poverty line.

=== 2010 census ===
At the 2010 census Citrus Heights had a population of 83,301. The population density was 5,854.6 inhabitants per square mile (2,260.5/km^{2}). The racial makeup of Citrus Heights was 66,856 (80.3%) White, 2,751 (3.3%) African American, 753 (0.9%) Native American, 2,714 (3.3%) Asian (1.2% Filipino, 0.4% Indian, 0.4% Chinese, 0.3% Japanese, 0.2% Vietnamese, 0.4% Other), 363 (0.4%) Pacific Islander, 5,348 (6.4%) from other races, and 4,516 (5.4%) from two or more races. Hispanic or Latino of any race were 13,734 persons (16.5%).

The census reported that 82,815 people (99.4% of the population) lived in households, 304 (0.4%) lived in non-institutionalized group quarters, and 182 (0.2%) were institutionalized.

There were 32,686 households, 10,452 (32.0%) had children under the age of 18 living in them, 14,241 (43.6%) were opposite-sex married couples living together, 4,689 (14.3%) had a female householder with no husband present, 2,027 (6.2%) had a male householder with no wife present. There were 2,653 (8.1%) unmarried opposite-sex partnerships, and 252 (0.8%) same-sex married couples or partnerships. 8,860 households (27.1%) were one person and 3,280 (10.0%) had someone living alone who was 65 or older. The average household size was 2.53. There were 20,957 families (64.1% of households); the average family size was 3.08.

The age distribution was 19,241 people (23.1%) under the age of 18, 8,480 people (10.2%) aged 18 to 24, 23,022 people (27.6%) aged 25 to 44, 21,473 people (25.8%) aged 45 to 64, and 11,085 people (13.3%) who were 65 or older. The median age was 36.2 years. For every 100 females, there were 94.1 males. For every 100 females age 18 and over, there were 91.0 males.

There were 35,075 housing units at an average density of 2,465.1 per square mile, of the occupied units 18,832 (57.6%) were owner-occupied and 13,854 (42.4%) were rented. The homeowner vacancy rate was 2.7%; the rental vacancy rate was 7.8%. 47,329 people (56.8% of the population) lived in owner-occupied housing units and 35,486 people (42.6%) lived in rental housing units.

== Economy ==
Citrus Heights is home to the Bird Cage Mall, the Citrus Town Center shopping center, and the Sunrise Village shopping center. The Geographical Center of Citrus Heights is in Sylvan Corners, home to two local breweries.

== Government ==
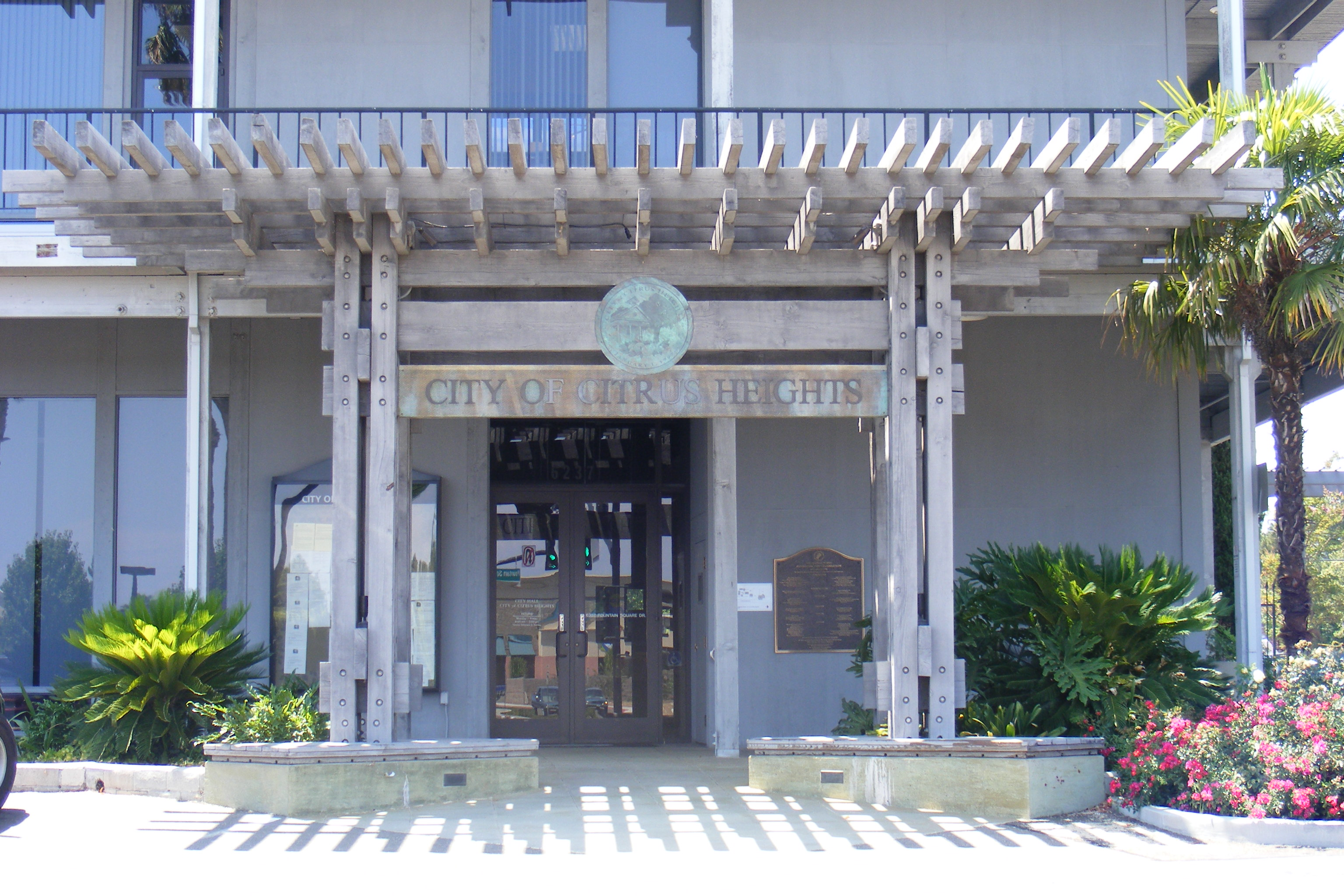
Former City Hall

In the California State Legislature, Citrus Heights is in the 6th senatorial district, represented by Republican Roger Niello, and in the 7th Assembly district, represented by Republican Josh Hoover.

In the United States House of Representatives, Citrus Heights is in California's 6th congressional district, represented by Democrat Ami Bera.

== Education ==
Citrus Heights is primarily served by the San Juan Unified School District. San Juan is the ninth largest school district in California and serves a 75-square-mile (190 km^{2}) area in northeast Sacramento County, including Citrus Heights. Within the city of Citrus Heights there are six elementary schools, one middle school, and two high schools. These schools serve over 10,000 students from the city of Citrus Heights. San Juan Unified School District also offers other educational schools and programs such as a special education centers, adult schools, adult handicapped schools, preschool, and before- and after-school programs. Universities and colleges that serve the area include: University of California, Davis; California State University, Sacramento; American River College; Sierra College; McGeorge School of Law; Lincoln Law School of Sacramento; Golden Gate University; University of Phoenix; and National University.

== Infrastructure ==
=== Transportation ===
Citrus Heights is centrally located between the region's major freeways and highways. Interstate 80 passes through the west side of the city, and Interstate 5, U.S. Highway 50 and California State Route 99 are all located from three to 11 miles (18 km) from the city. The Business Interstate 80 freeway, otherwise known as the Capital City Freeway, begins near downtown Sacramento and ends a few miles southwest of Citrus Heights. Sacramento International Airport is located approximately 20 miles (32 km) west of the city, while rail transportation provided by Amtrak is accessible in Roseville (about 5 miles (8.0 km) north of the city). Public bus transportation is currently provided by the Sacramento Regional Transit District.

=== Police department ===
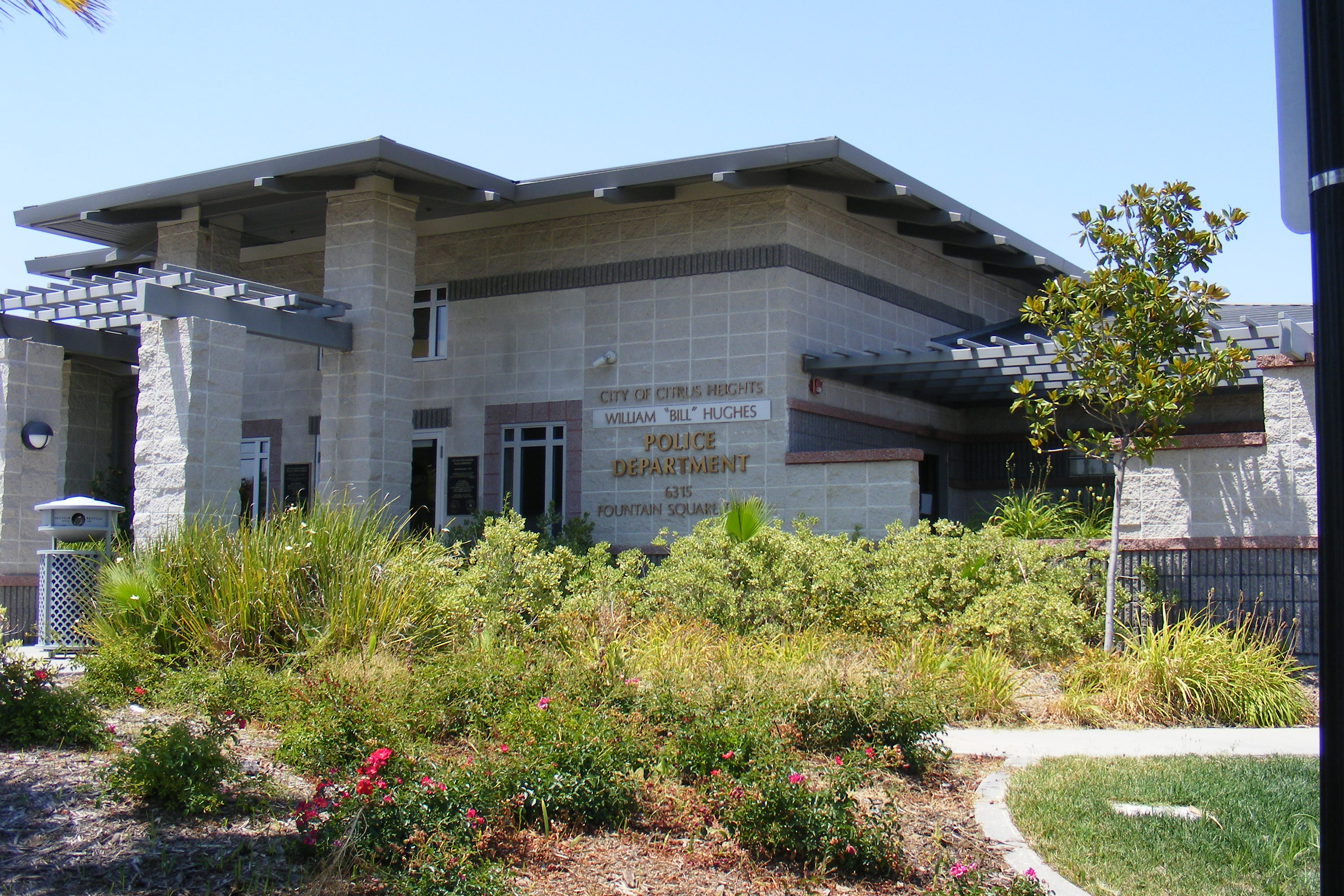
The CHPD offices near the city hall

Police services in Citrus Heights were provided by the Sacramento County Sheriff's Department until 2006, when Citrus Heights formed its own police department, attracting police officers from 62 different police agencies throughout California. The police department is a full-service agency, with specialty units such as SWAT, Special Investigations, Traffic and School Resource Officers. The department operates its own communications center, which answers emergency calls and dispatches police.

== Notable people ==
- Bill Conroy - MLB catcher
- Joseph James DeAngelo - serial rapist and serial killer
- Kelley Jones - artist
- Mandisa - singer
- Jackie Lynn Taylor - Our Gang actress (1934)

== See also ==
- Rusch Botanical Gardens
- Stones Gambling Hall Cheating Scandal (aka Postlegate)
- Sunrise Mall
