= Liberty House (department store) =

Former American specialty store chain

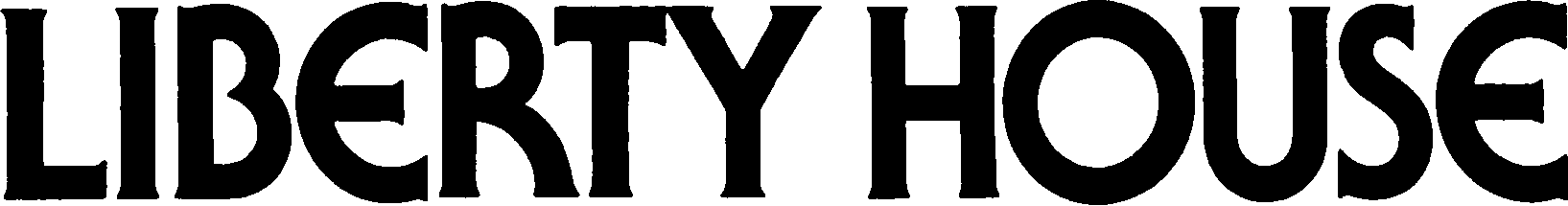
- Formerly: Hackfeld's Dry Goods (1849-1852); B. F. Ehlers (1852-1898); H. Hackfeld & Co. (1898-1918)
- Industry: Department store
- Founded: 1849; 177 years ago
- Founder: Heinrich Hackfeld
- Defunct: 2001; 25 years ago
- Fate: Acquired by Federated Department Stores; merged into Macy's West
- Headquarters: Honolulu, Hawaii, United States
- Number of locations: 45-50 (at its peak)
- Number of employees: 4,200 (at its peak)
- Parent: Amfac (1918-1988); JMB Realty (1988-2001)

Liberty House, headquartered in Honolulu, Hawaii, was a department store and specialty store chain with locations throughout the Hawaiian Islands and on Guam, as well as several locations on the United States mainland.

Liberty House Department Store HI Final Logo

== History ==
Tracing its antecedents to Hackfeld's Dry Goods formed by German trader Heinrich Hackfeld in 1849, in 1852 the retail location was renamed for Hackfeld's nephew, B. F. Ehlers. Hackfeld continued to maintain an interest in the store, while he concentrated on his trading, shipping and real-estate interests. In 1881, Paul Isenberg (1837–1903) became half partner in the business. In 1898 the Hackfeld and Isenberg family interests in Hawaii were officially reorganized as H. Hackfeld & Co.

In 1918 at the height of World War I, H. Hackfeld & Co. was seized by the American government as alien property (since many of the Hackfeld and Isenberg heirs still lived in Germany), and was sold to a newly formed consortium, American Factors. At the same time the B.F. Ehlers store was renamed The Liberty House in response to anti-German sentiment. With Hackfeld's huge sugarcane plantations and land interests, American Factors (later known as Amfac) became one of Hawaii's Big Five landowners. In 1969 Liberty House expanded onto the mainland with Amfac's purchase of the Rhodes Western department stores, a long-time consolidator of department stores. The former Rhodes' stores were renamed Liberty House between 1971 and 1974. The mainland operation eventually included stores in Arizona, California, Nevada, Oregon, Texas, New Mexico and Washington. This expansion culminated with the construction of a new San Francisco flagship store in 1974 at Stockton and O'Farrell streets. Poor results and a scattered footprint caused the rethinking of future investment, and in 1978 Liberty House began winding down the mainland stores, with the remaining ten being sold in 1984.

Liberty House closed nine of its ten California stores in 1984 due to poor sales. The only one not closed at the time was San Mateo Fashion Island in San Mateo, California, which stayed open until 1986.

In 1988 Amfac was acquired in a leveraged-buyout by JMB Realty Corp., a Chicago real estate investment company, under whose ownership Liberty House expanded to Micronesia Mall in Guam in 1994. In 1998 Liberty House filed Chapter 11 bankruptcy, under which it closed most of its resort store business, which had totaled over 40 stores at one point. In 2001, after emerging from bankruptcy, the company was acquired by Federated Department Stores and merged into Macy's West. Macy's currently maintains a common law trademark by using the LibertyHouse.com domain which forwards to the Macy's website. The San Francisco Liberty House would become the Men's Store of Macy's Union Square until 2017, when Macy's would close it and it would be renovated for mixed-use.

Liberty House Department Store Classic Logo

== See also ==
- List of department stores converted to Macy's
