= List of shopping malls in California =

The following page is a list of shopping malls in the U.S. state of California. The largest malls, with a gross leasable area of at least 400,000 sq ft (37,000 m^{2}), are in bold font, with a ranking number based on size and date.

== Super-regional enclosed malls ==
- Arden Fair – Sacramento (1957)
- Beverly Center – Los Angeles (1982)
- Brea Mall – Brea (1977)
- **(2) Del Amo Fashion Center – Torrance – 2,517,765 sq ft (233,908.0 m^{2})** (1961)
- Fashion Fair – Fresno (1970)
- Galleria at Tyler – Riverside (1970)
- **(6) Glendale Galleria – Glendale – 1,600,000 sq ft (150,000 m^{2})** (1976)
- Hillsdale Shopping Center – San Mateo (1954)
- Inland Center – San Bernardino (1966)
- **(4) Lakewood Center – Lakewood – 2,069,000 sq ft (192,200 m^{2})** (1951)
- Los Cerritos Center – Cerritos (1971)
- MainPlace Mall – Santa Ana (1987)
- Mershops North County - Escondido (1986)
- Mershops Antelope Valley - Palmdale (1990)
- Mershops Shops at Montebello - Montebello (1985)
- Montclair Plaza – Montclair (1968)
- Moreno Valley Mall – Moreno Valley (1992)
- NewPark Mall – Newark (1980)
- Northridge Fashion Center – Northridge (1971)
- The Oaks – Thousand Oaks (1978)
- Pacific View Mall – Ventura (1964)
- Promenade Temecula – Temecula (1999)
- **(8) San Francisco Centre – San Francisco – 1,564,533 sq ft (145,349.9 m^{2})** (1988)
- Santa Rosa Plaza – Santa Rosa (1983)
- The Shoppes at Carlsbad – Carlsbad (1969)
- The Shops at Mission Viejo – Mission Viejo (1979)
- The Shops at Palm Desert – Palm Desert (1982)
- (**9) The Shops at Santa Anita – Arcadia –** **1,480,000 sq ft (137,000 m^{2})** (1974)
- The Source OC – Buena Park (2017)
- Solano Town Center – Fairfield (1981)
- **(1) South Coast Plaza – Costa Mesa – 2,800,000 sq ft (260,000 m^{2})** (1967)
- Stoneridge Shopping Center – Pleasanton (1980)
- Stonestown Galleria – San Francisco (1952)
- Stonewood Center – Downey (1958)
- Sunvalley Shopping Center – Concord (1967)
- Valencia Town Center – Santa Clarita (1992)
- Valley Plaza Mall – Bakersfield (1967)
- Vintage Faire Mall – Modesto (1977)
- Westfield Culver City – Culver City (1977)
- Westfield Fashion Square – Sherman Oaks (1962)
- **(12) Westfield Galleria at Roseville – Roseville – 1,336,009 sq ft (124,119.3 m^{2})** (2000)
- Westfield Oakridge – San Jose (1971)
- Westfield Plaza Bonita – National City (1981)
- **(7) Westfield Topanga – Canoga Park – 1,588,050 sq ft (147,535 m^{2})** (1964)
- **(3) Westfield Valley Fair – San Jose – 2,200,000 sq ft (200,000 m^{2})** (1986)

== Lifestyle centers / outdoor shopping centers ==
- 2nd & PCH – Long Beach (2019)
- Anaheim GardenWalk – Anaheim (2008)
- Broadway Plaza – Walnut Creek (1951)
- Chula Vista Center – Chula Vista (1962)
- City Center Bishop Ranch – San Ramon (2018)
- The Commons at Calabasas – Calabasas (1998)
- Del Monte Center – Monterey (1967)
- Downtown Commons – Sacramento (1971)
- Downtown Disney – Anaheim (2001)
- Fashion Island – Newport Beach (1961)
- **(5) Fashion Valley – San Diego – 1,720,533 sq ft (159,842.7 m^{2})** (1969)
- FIGat7th – Los Angeles (1986)
- Fig Garden Village – Fresno (1962)
- The Forum at Carlsbad – Carlsbad (2003)
- The Fountains at Roseville – Roseville (2008)
- The Gardens on El Paseo – Palm Desert (1998)
- Ghirardelli Square – San Francisco (1893)
- Grossmont Center – La Mesa (1961)
- The Grove at Farmers Market – Los Angeles (2002)
- Irvine Spectrum Center – Irvine (1995)
- La Cumbre Plaza – Santa Barbara (1967)
- Malibu Country Mart – Malibu (1975)
- Malibu Lumber Yard – Malibu (2009)
- Marin Country Mart – Larkspur (1975)
- Mill Valley Lumber Yard –Mill Valley (2018)
- Mission Valley Center – San Diego (1961)
- One Paseo – San Diego (2019)
- Otay Ranch Town Center – Chula Vista (2006)
- Pacific City – Huntington Beach (2015)
- The Palladio at Broadstone – Folsom (2008)
- The Paseo – Pasadena (1980)
- Paseo Nuevo – Santa Barbara (1990)
- Platform – Culver City (2016)
- Plaza El Segundo – El Segundo (2006)
- The Point – El Segundo (2015)
- The Promenade at Westlake – Westlake Village (1997)
- Promenade on the Peninsula – Rolling Hills Estates (1981)
- The Promenade Shops at Orchard Valley – Manteca (2008)
- The River at Rancho Mirage – Rancho Mirage (2001)
- Riviera Village – Redondo Beach (1961)
- The Runway – Playa Vista (2015)
- Santa Monica Place – Santa Monica (1980)
- The Shops at Dos Lagos – Corona (2006)
- The Shops at River Park – Fresno (1996)
- The Shops at Sportsman's Lodge – Studio City (2022)
- The Streets of Brentwood – Brentwood (2008)
- Vietnam Town – San Jose (2007)
- Simi Valley Town Center – Simi Valley (2005)
- **(11) Stanford Shopping Center – Palo Alto – 1,347,935 sq ft (125,227.3 m^{2})** (1955)
- Town Center at Corte Madera – Corte Madera (1958)
- Triangle Square – Costa Mesa (1992)
- The Village at Corte Madera – Corte Madera (1985)
- Westfield Century City – Los Angeles (1964)
- Westfield UTC – San Diego (1977)

== Mixed-use developments ==
- The Americana at Brand – Glendale
- Bay Street Emeryville – Emeryville
- Bella Terra – Huntington Beach
- The Collection at RiverPark – Oxnard
- The District at Tustin Legacy – Tustin
- Hollywood and Highland – Los Angeles
- Marina Pacifica – Long Beach
- NoHo West – North Hollywood
- Nut Tree – Vacaville
- Santana Row – San Jose
- Sherman Oaks Galleria – Sherman Oaks
- Universal CityWalk – Universal City
- Victoria Gardens – Rancho Cucamonga

== Regional enclosed malls ==
- Baldwin Hills Crenshaw Plaza – Los Angeles
- Bayfair Center – San Leandro
- Bayshore Mall – Eureka
- Buena Park Downtown – Buena Park
- Burbank Town Center – Burbank
- Capitola Mall – Capitola
- Chico Marketplace – Chico
- Coddingtown Mall – Santa Rosa
- Eagle Rock Plaza – Eagle Rock
- Eastridge Center – San Jose
- Grand Century Mall – San Jose
- Hanford Mall – Hanford
- Imperial Valley Mall – El Centro
- The Mall of Victor Valley – Victorville
- Manhattan Village – Manhattan Beach
- Mershops Northridge - Salinas
- Mershops Weberstown - Stockton
- Metreon – San Francisco
- Mt. Shasta Mall – Redding
- Northgate Mall – San Rafael
- Panorama Mall – Panorama City
- Parkway Plaza – El Cajon
- Plaza West Covina – West Covina
- Santa Maria Town Center – Santa Maria
- Serramonte Center – Daly City
- The Shops at Tanforan – San Bruno
- Somersville Towne Center – Antioch
- South Bay Galleria – Redondo Beach
- SouthBay Pavilion – Carson
- Southland Mall – Hayward
- Sunrise Mall – Citrus Heights
- Visalia Mall – Visalia
- West Hollywood Gateway – West Hollywood
- West Valley Mall – Tracy
- Westgate Center – San Jose
- Yuba Sutter Marketplace – Yuba City

== Outlet malls ==
- Camarillo Premium Outlets – Camarillo
- Carlsbad Premium Outlets - Carlsbad
- Citadel Outlets – Commerce
- Desert Hills Premium Outlets – Cabazon
- Folsom Premium Outlets – Folsom
- Gilroy Premium Outlets – Gilroy
- Gran Plaza Outlets – Calexico
- **(10) Great Mall of the Bay Area – Milpitas – 1,366,123 sq ft (126,917.0 m^{2})**
- Las Americas Premium Outlets – San Ysidro
- Ontario Mills – Ontario
- Outlets at Barstow – Barstow
- The Outlets at Orange – Orange (1998)
- Outlets at San Clemente – San Clemente
- The Outlets at Tejon – Wheeler Ridge
- Petaluma Village Premium Outlets – Petaluma
- The Pike Outlets – Long Beach
- San Francisco Premium Outlets – Livermore
- Shasta Gateway – Anderson
- The Shoppes at Chino Hills – Chino Hills
- Vacaville Premium Outlets – Vacaville
- Viejas Outlet Center – Alpine

== Power centers / outside strip centers ==
- 280 Metro Center – Colma
- 8000 Sunset Strip – Los Angeles
- Alameda South Shore Center – Alameda
- Anaheim Plaza – Anaheim
- Beverly Connection – Beverly Grove, Los Angeles
- Broadstone Plaza – Folsom
- Chino Spectrum Marketplace – Chino
- Chino Spectrum Towne Center – Chino
- College Grove Shopping Center – Lemon Grove
- Crossings at Corona – Corona
- Delta Shores Shopping Center – Sacramento
- The Dunes on Monterey Bay – Marina
- Eastland Center – West Covina
- Eastvale Gateway – Eastvale
- El Cerrito Plaza – El Cerrito
- Encino Place – Encino
- Florin Towne Centre – Sacramento
- Fremont Hub Shopping Center – Fremont
- Gower Gulch Plaza – Los Angeles
- Indio Towne Center – Indio
- La Habra Market Place – La Habra
- La Jolla Village Square – La Jolla
- Long Beach Towne Center – Long Beach – 1,000,000 sq ft (93,000 m^{2})
- Los Altos Center – Long Beach
- Macdonald 80 Shopping Center – Richmond
- Marketplace at El Paseo – Fresno
- Mira Mesa Mall – Mira Mesa
- Natomas Marketplace – Sacramento
- NorthPoint Centre – San Francisco
- One Westside Shopping Center – Los Angeles
- Pacific Commons – Fremont
- Palo Cedro Shopping Center – Palo Cedro
- Paraiso Town Center – Thousand Oaks
- Park Plaza Shopping Center – San Pedro
- Park West Place – Stockton
- Peninsula Shopping Center – Rolling Hills Estates
- Plaza De La Cañada Shopping Center – La Cañada Flintridge
- The Plaza at Imperial Valley – El Centro
- Plaza Mayor Shopping Center – Torrance
- Point Dume Plaza Shopping Center – Malibu
- Porter Ranch Town Center – Porter Ranch
- Princeton Plaza Mall – San Jose
- The Promenade at Sacramento Gateway – Sacramento
- Pruneyard Shopping Center – Campbell
- Sherwood Place – Stockton
- The Quad at Whittier – Whittier
- Westlake Shopping Center – Daly City
- Whittwood Town Center – Whittier
- The Willows Shopping Center – Concord
- Woodland Gateway – Woodland

== Notable small shopping centers ==
- ARCO Plaza – Downtown Los Angeles
- Los Angeles Mall – Civic Center, Los Angeles

== Dead malls ==
Abandoned or nearly-unoccupied malls in the state of California.

- Barstow Mall – Barstow
- Blackhawk Plaza – Danville
- Country Club Plaza – Sacramento
- Crocker Galleria - San Francisco
- Embarcadero Center – San Francisco
- Indio Fashion Mall (now Indio Grand Marketplace) – Indio
- Hemet Valley Mall – Hemet
- Manchester Center – Fresno
- Puente Hills Mall – City of Industry
- Westgate Center – San Leandro

== Demolished / closed malls ==
- Carousel Mall – San Bernardino (October 11, 1972 – August 22, 2017)
- Central Coast Plaza – San Luis Obispo (1986-2000)
- County Fair Mall – Woodland (1986-2024; opened in 1986 and closed in February 2024 due to code violations, anchor still open)
- Country Club Centre – Sacramento (August 21, 1952 – present) – now a conventional outdoor shopping center
- Desert Fashion Plaza – Palm Springs (October 1967 – 2001) – demolished in 2013; now The Block Palm Springs
- East Hills Mall – Bakersfield (1988–2017); an enclosed shopping mall that opened in 1988. The mall closed on March 3, 2017, after its remaining tenants vacated the property ahead of a planned redevelopment.
- Eastmont Mall - Oakland (1966-2008) - now Eastmont Town Center
- Eureka Mall – Eureka – now a conventional outdoor shopping center
- Sequoia Mall – Visalia (1974–2023); an enclosed shopping mall that opened in 1974. Its interior closed on March 31, 2023, for redevelopment, while businesses with exterior entrances remained open. The property was later converted into an open-air shopping center known as the Boulevard at Sequoia.
- Fallbrook Mall – West Hills (November 12, 1963 – 1997) – now Fallbrook Center
- Florin Mall – Sacramento (February 1968 – February 28, 2006) – now Florin Towne Centre
- Hawthorne Plaza – Hawthorne (1977–1999)
- Horton Plaza – San Diego (August 9, 1985 – 2019)
- La Habra Fashion Square – La Habra (1969–1994) – now La Habra Market Place
- La Mirada Mall – La Mirada
- Laguna Hills Mall – Laguna Hills (April 1973 – December 31, 2018) - being rebuilt as The Village at Laguna Hills
- Laurel Plaza – North Hollywood (1968–1994) – now NoHo West
- Long Beach Plaza – Long Beach (1982–2000) – now Long Beach City Place
- Mountain Gate Plaza – Simi Valley
- Palm Springs Mall – Palm Springs
- Redlands Mall – Redlands (1977–2011)
- Sunnyvale Town Center – Sunnyvale (1979–2018) – now Cityline Sunnyvale
- Vallco Shopping Mall – Cupertino (1976–2020)
- Valley Plaza – North Hollywood (August 12, 1951 – present) – most elements abandoned or demolished, some remain
- The Village at Orange – Orange (August 16, 1971 – January 31, 2024) – many exterior tenants remain in business and being rebuilt as a lifestyle center
- Westfield Promenade – Woodland Hills (March 1973 – present)
- Westminster Mall (California) – Westminster, California (August 7 1974– October 29 2025)
- Westside Pavilion – West Los Angeles (1985–2019)

There are many more malls throughout the state of California.

== See also ==
- List of shopping malls in the United States
