= Northgate Mall (San Rafael, California) =

Northgate
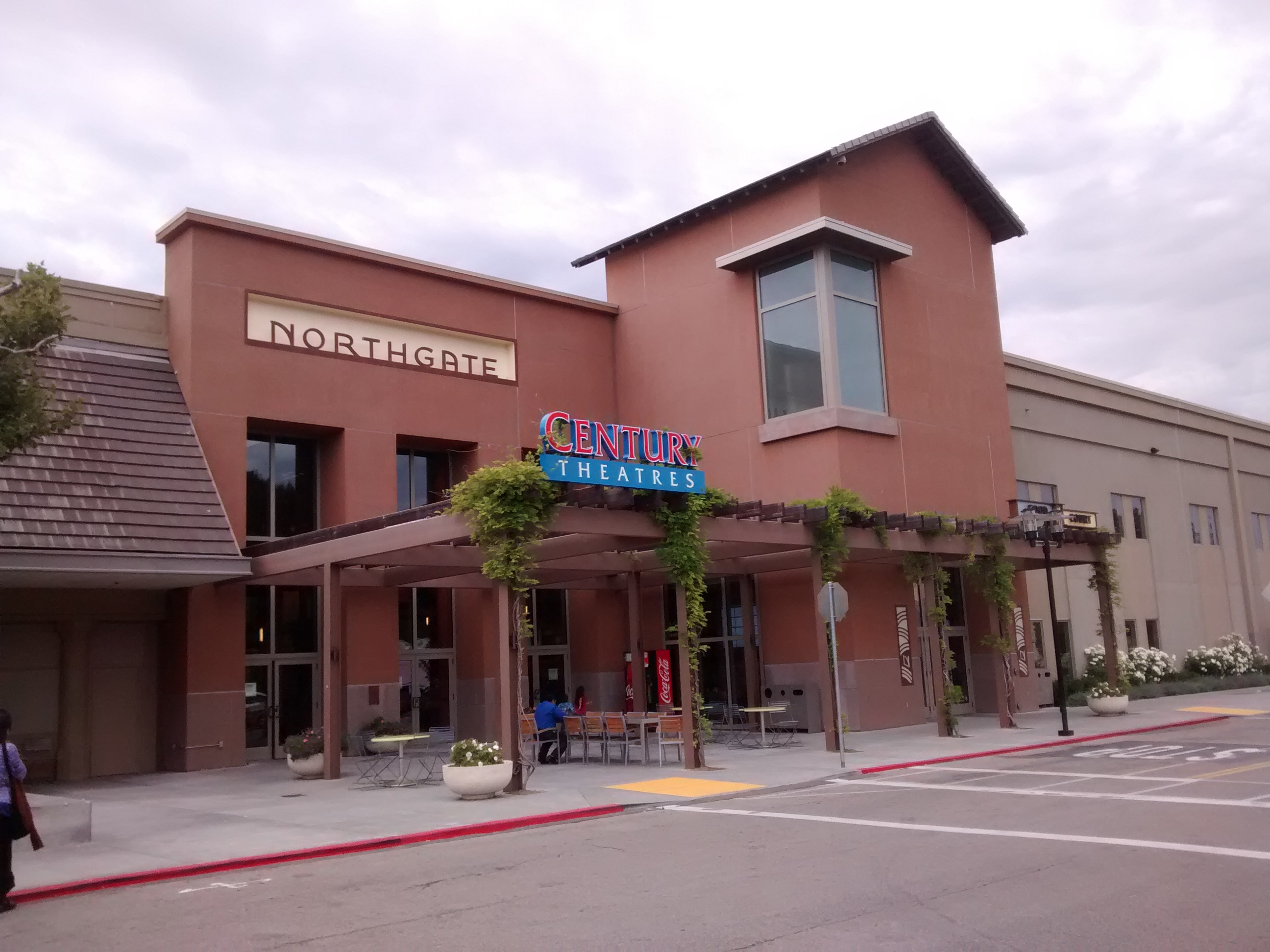
- Location: San Rafael, California, United States
- Coordinates: 38.005233°N 122.543997°W
- Address: 5800 Northgate Drive
- Opened: 1966
- Manager: Merlone Geier Partners
- Owner: Merlone Geier Partners
- Num. of stores: 91
- Num. of anchor tenants: 3 (2 open, 1 demolished)
- Floor area: 731,803 sq ft (67,986.7 m^{2})
- Floors: 1 (2 in anchors)
- Website: shopatnorthgate.com

Northgate Mall (also known as the Terra Linda Shopping Center) is a shopping mall located in the Terra Linda neighborhood of San Rafael, California, United States, 15 miles (24 km) north of the Golden Gate Bridge. It is the largest of three shopping centers in San Rafael called Northgate. It was managed by The Macerich Company until 2017 and is now managed by Merlone Geier Partners. It is the only enclosed regional shopping center in Marin County.

The mall's anchors are Macy's and RH Outlet. It also features HomeGoods, a food court, and more than 90 specialty stores, services, and restaurants, including the sole remaining Gloria Jean's location in California. It formerly featured a Century Theatres multiplex that was shuttered in 2024 and a Rite Aid that was shuttered in 2025. The former Sears building is undergoing demolition as of 2026.

== History ==
The original anchor in the corner, now occupied by Macy's, was The Emporium, which opened in 1964. When the rest of the mall opened in 1965, it had an open-air design. The mall was enclosed when it was renovated in 1987.

MTR Properties, Inc. was the original owner of the mall. Macerich bought the property in 1985 before selling it to Merlone Geier Partners in 2017.

On January 4, 2018, Sears announced that its store at the mall will be closing as part of a plan to close 103 stores nationwide. The store closed in April 2018. A portion of the first level of the former Sears was later occupied by RH Outlet. Around the same time, plans were announced that would transform the mall into a "town center."

On November 14, 2019, Forever 21 announced that the Northgate Mall location would be closing along with 21 other locations in California and 90 locations nationwide. It closed in January 2020.

The Century Theatres location in the mall opened on November 17, 1994, and closed on November 10, 2024.

On January 9, 2025, Kohl's announced it would close its Northgate Mall location as part of a plan to shutter 27 underperforming stores. Kohl's closed in late March 2025. In 2026, RH Outlet relocated to the former Kohl's and opened a furniture store there.

Demolition of the former Sears store began in 2026.

== Renovation ==
Macerich began renovating the mall in 2008. The renovation was controversial, as housing advocates pushed for inclusion of affordable housing in the project to replace the aging housing in San Rafael's Canal Area, while Macerich chose to proceed without triggering a full-scale environmental review.

In November 2009, Northgate underwent a significant overhaul that introduced features that integrate indoor and outdoor spaces. These include the Oak Plaza, a central courtyard for gatherings, open-air dining areas, and a food court near the Century Theatres that opens to both indoor and outdoor seating.

== Redevelopment project ==
In March 2021, Merlone Geier Partners submitted a two-phase redevelopment project to the City of San Rafael. The first phase proposed to begin in 2025, involves demolition of the center portion of the mall, the former Sears anchor store, and the HomeGoods store across the east entrance from the mall. The HomeGoods will be relocated to another part of the property. The first phase also includes a remodel and expansion of the existing cinema to a total of 65,000 square feet. The cinema will include an IMAX theater.

In addition to the demolition and remodel projects, the first phase includes the construction of four new apartment buildings on the southeast side of the property, totaling 896 residences. One building is proposed to be four stories, while the others are proposed to be five stories. The apartment buildings will have retail spaces at the ground level, and new retail spaces are expected to be constructed across Las Gallinas Avenue.

The second phase of the project is proposed to begin in 2028, beginning with the demolition of existing mall commercial space. The demolition includes the existing Macy's and RH Outlet stores, should they not renew their leases with the property. The second phase also includes the construction of two five-story apartment buildings, totaling 640 residences.

After both phases, the mall is expected to retain approximately 250,000 square feet of its original floor area. Parking is expected to reduce from the current 2,908 spaces to 2,311 spaces.

By September 2026, demolition work had led almost all tenants to leave the mall. Macy's remains open; only one tenant remains in the food court, a gelato store called Daily Recess that moved in during 2024 and many of whose customers visit the mall only for gelato.

== Gallery ==
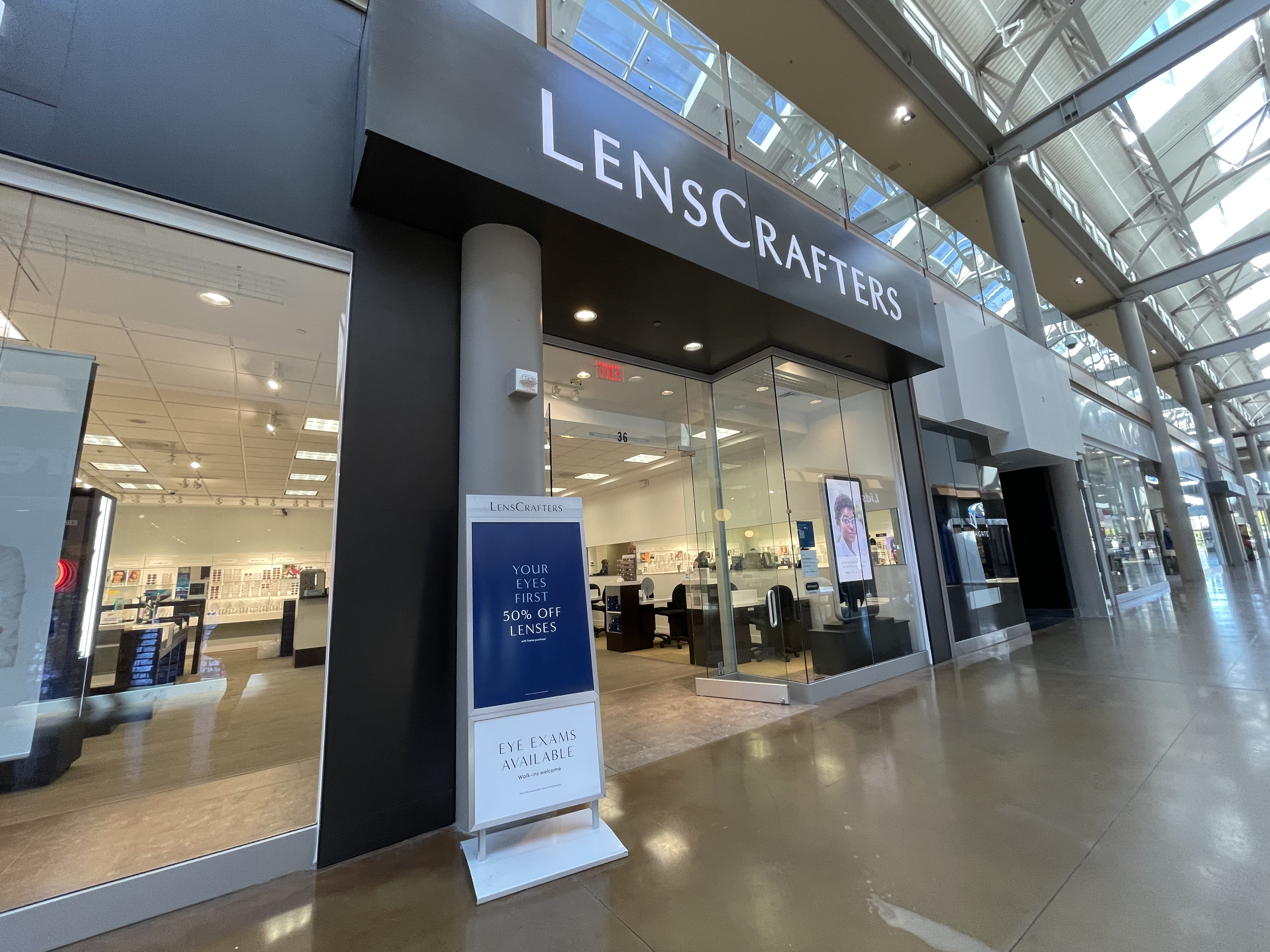
LensCrafters store at Northgate Mall in 2022.
