= Emporium Capwell Co. v. Western Addition Community Organization =

- Supreme Court of the United States

Argued October 22, 1974 Decided February 18, 1975
- Full case name: Emporium Capwell Company v. Western Addition Community Organization
- Docket no.: 73-696
- Citations: 420 U.S. 50 (more) 95 S. Ct. 977; 43 L. Ed. 2d 12
- Argument: Oral argument
- Opinion announcement: Opinion announcement

Case history
- Prior: Western Addition Community Organization v. NLRB, 485 F.2d 917 (D.C. Cir. 1973); cert. granted, 415 U.S. 913 (1974).

Holding
- The National Labor Relations Act of 1935 does not protect concerted activity by minority employees to bargain with their employer over issues of employment discrimination, thus bypassing their exclusive bargaining representative.

Court membership
- Chief Justice Warren E. Burger Associate Justices William O. Douglas · William J. Brennan Jr. Potter Stewart · Byron White; Thurgood Marshall · Harry Blackmun; Lewis F. Powell Jr. · William Rehnquist

Case opinions
- Majority: Marshall, joined by Burger, Brennan, Stewart, White, Blackmun, Powell, Rehnquist
- Dissent: Douglas

Emporium Capwell Co. v. Western Addition Community Organization, 420 U.S. 50 (1975), was a United States Supreme Court case. The court reversed and remanded the Court of Appeals ruling. The Supreme Court ruled on the basis of the Civil Rights Act of 1964 and the National Labor Relations Act of 1935 (NLRA).

== Background ==
Emporium Capwell was a department store chain in San Francisco. Most minorities worked in the stock and marketing area of the store, while Caucasians worked in the selling areas where the furniture and electronics were. The union for the Emporium was known as the Local 1100. At the beginning of the 20th century, President Woodrow Wilson created the War Labor Board in 1918. The War Labor Board was President Wilson's tactic of decreasing the increasing tension of employees and employers. The board could not do much, but it did manage to negotiate the employers into a somewhat peaceful agreement of no strikes and lockouts. Congress then passed the Norris-LaGuardia Act of 1932, which stated that the courts cannot put an injunction on strikes. The National Labor Relations Board (NLRB) was founded the day that Congress passed the NLRA. The board consists of five president-appointed and senate-approved people. The purpose of this board is to protect the rights of workers. The National Labor Relations Act of 1935, also known as the Wagner Act, gave employees the right to form labor unions and to negotiate with their employer. Through this act, workers found the courage to organize unions more and negotiate better wages and working conditions with their employers.

== History ==
Local 1100, the union representing workers at Emporium Capwell, had a large increase in membership in 1968. This was due to minorities joining the union and filing many complaints. Tom Hawkins, Jim Hollins, and other African American clerks had been working at the Emporium for a long time, and most of them had seniority. The minorities believed they deserved promotions because of their intelligence and how long they had been at the job. The complaints were suggested to be taken as individual complaints instead of a store-wide complaint issued by black employees. The employees felt like their grievance was not heard and was not being brought to the forefront of the union's issues with the company, so the black employees disregarded the union's grievance system. The union advised the black workers several times to not boycott, or picket, the store, but this fell on deaf ears. On November 9, 1968, a group of workers from the Emporium began a boycott of the store. The boycott did not make news. After two Saturdays of leafleting in front of the store, Hawkins and Hollins were fired. According to the department store, the situation could have been better handled through arbitration. The leafleting was seen as a deliberate attempt to hurt the store in order to get the Emporium to negotiate with them individually.

== Supreme Court considerations ==
The Supreme Court took into considerations other cases such as NLRB v. Allis-Chalmers Company and NLRB v. Jones & Laughlin Steel Corp, to make their determining decision. The courts had many cases before pertaining to the NLRB and NLRA. This decision would either limit or expand the rights of unionists and also affect minorities.

== Decision ==
On February 18, 1975, the court released an 8–1 decision which reversed the decision of the lower courts. The Supreme Court was reluctant to make a decision that would override the statutes of Title VII.

=== Majority opinion ===
The Supreme Court justices made the decision in favor of Emporium. The NLRA protects the union from being fired for protesting and gives them the right to negotiate with their employer. The justices argued that the NLRA was not violated at any point during this entire situation. The justices argued that Hollins and Hawkins felt that they were discriminated against, and by taking action based on their feelings then the employers, Emporium, were not wrong in their actions. The justices opinionated that on statutory grounds, this case may be appropriate but not on the terms that was being brought before them.

=== Douglas' dissent ===
Justice William Orville Douglas wrote a dissent in which he stood alone in. He objected that the court's ruling would leave those who were in minority groups within the union powerless against the majority. This would, in essence, repress the needs of the few. Douglas also argued that the union was in breach of its duties to represent its members fairly. Douglas held that Alexander v. Gardner-Denver Co. prohibited unions from stopping seeking help through Title VII. Throughout his dissent, Douglas equated the court's decision to making minorities and individuals prisoners of the union system.
