= Solano Town Center =

Shopping mall in Fairfield, California, U.S.

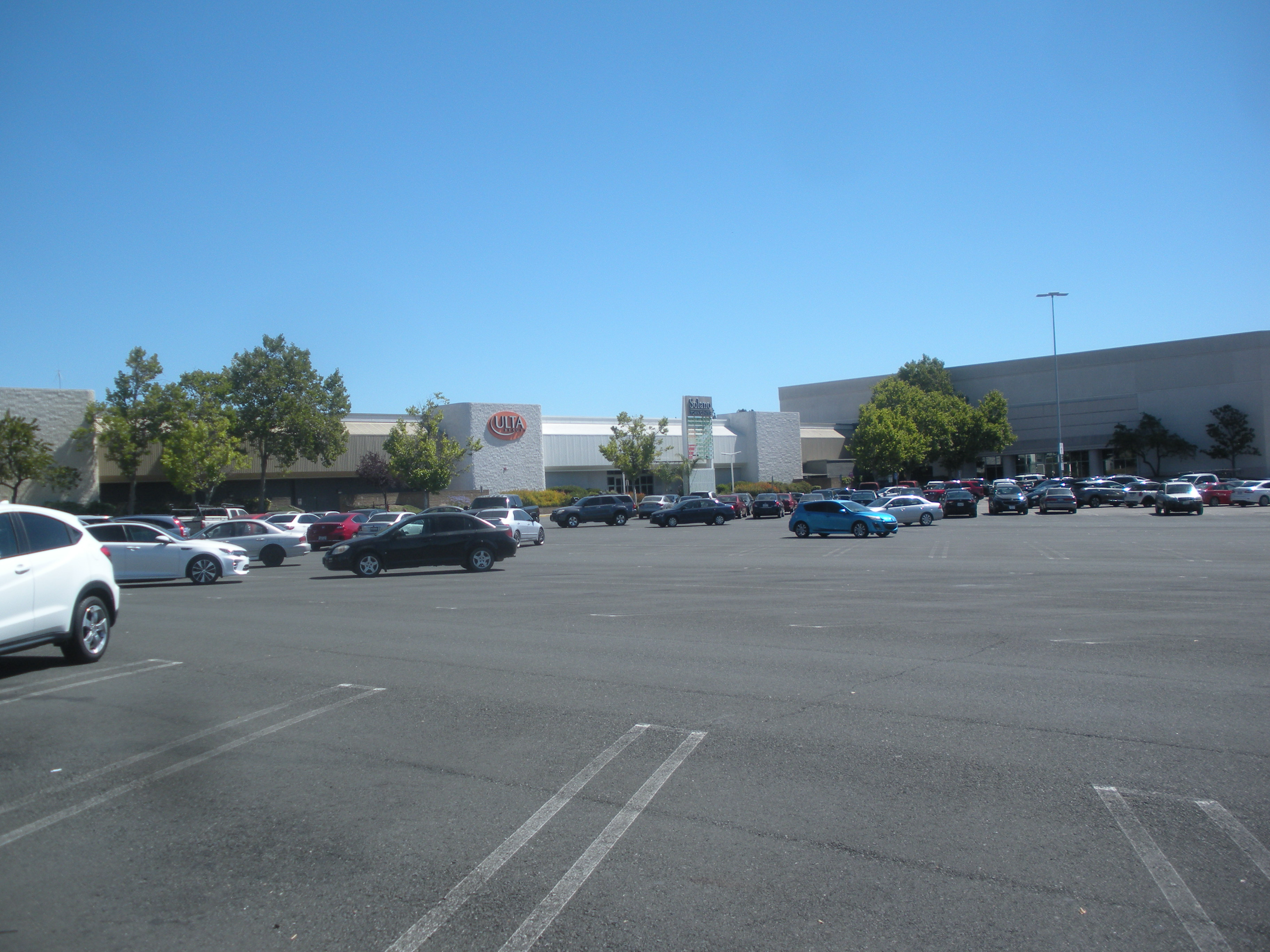
- View from parking lot
- Location: Fairfield, California
- Coordinates: 38.26290°N 122.05420°W
- Address: 1350 Travis Blvd
- Opened: 1981; 45 years ago
- Developer: The Hahn Company
- Manager: Spinoso Real Estate Group
- Owner: Starwood Retail Partners
- Num. of stores: 130
- Num. of anchor tenants: 5 (4 open, 1 vacant)
- Floor area: 1,040,000 sq ft (97,000 m^{2})
- Floors: 2 (3 in the Macy's, former The Emporium/Sears and original Sears buildings)
- Website: shoppingsolanotowncenter.com

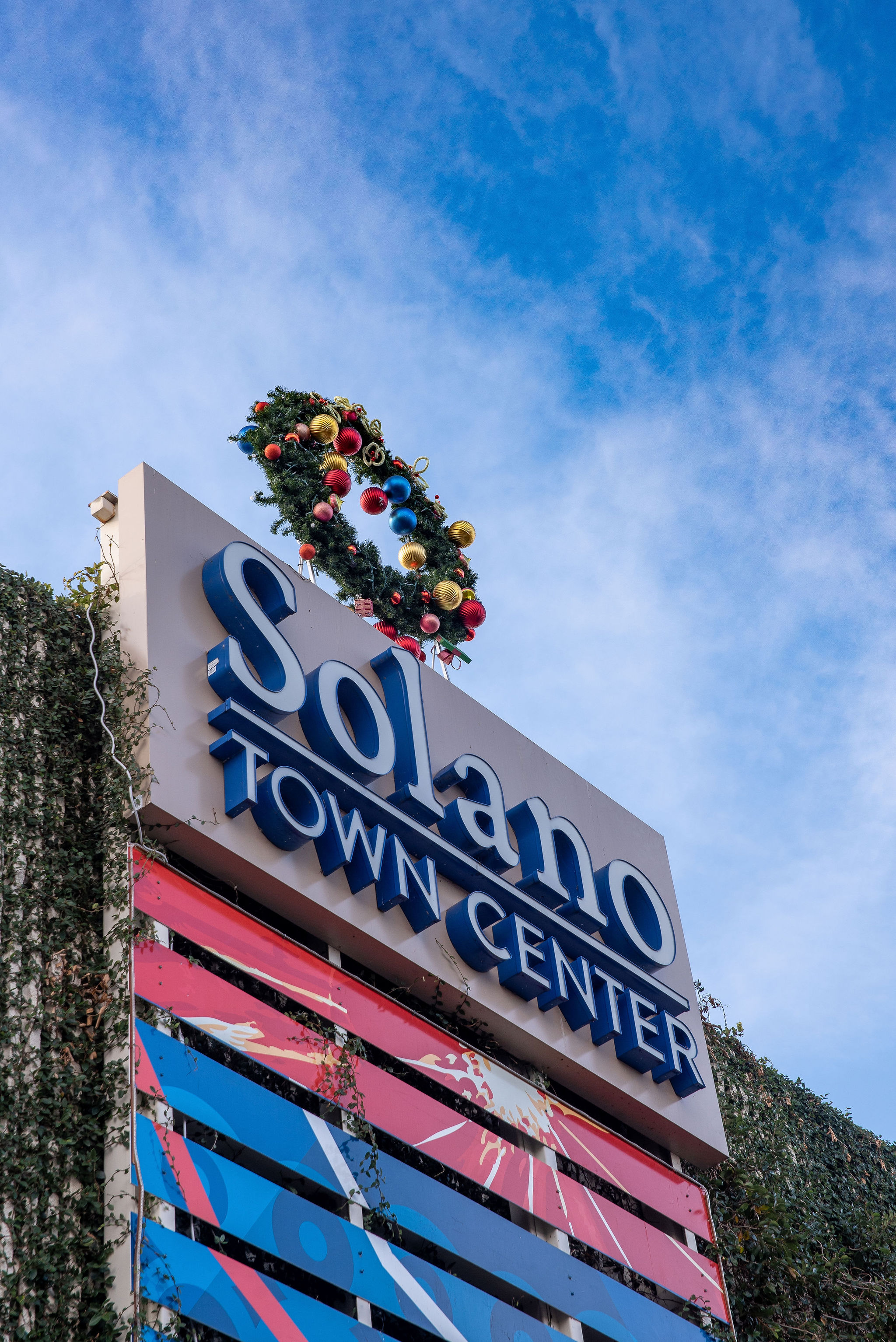
Solano Town Center sign

Solano Town Center, formerly Westfield Solano and Solano Mall, and colloquially known as the Fairfield Mall, is a shopping mall in Fairfield, California, United States, with over 125 stores, multiple restaurants and dining options. The mall is located on Travis Boulevard, one block east of I-80 off the Travis Boulevard exit. Solano Town Center is owned by Starwood Retail Partners and is leased and managed by Spinoso Real Estate Group.

== History ==
Solano Town Center opened in 1981 as Solano Mall with original anchors Emporium Capwell, JCPenney and Sears.

Westfield America, Inc., a precursor to the Westfield Group, acquired the shopping center in 1998 and renamed it Westfield Shoppingtown Solano, dropping the "Shoppingtown" name in June 2005. In April 2012, The Westfield Group sold the establishment to Starwood Capital Group. In November 2012, the name changed again to Solano Town Center.

Macy’s later became the fourth anchor store at the mall, with them opting to close the former Emporium space upon their 1996 acquisition of the chain. Sears would later move into the former Emporium building, with their previous spot being demolished with Best Buy and Edwards Cinemas being built on the site’s bottom and top levels respectively. Mervyn's was the mall's fifth anchor store until they went out of business in 2008. Forever 21 moved into the upper level of the former Mervyn's in 2010. Sports Authority moved into the lower level of the former Mervyn's in 2011, which closed when that chain went out of business in 2016. The space has since been taken by Dick's Sporting Goods in 2017. In 2015, Sears Holdings spun off 235 of its properties, including the Sears at Solano Town Center, into Seritage Growth Properties. Sears closed its location in July 2018. In early 2020, Dave & Buster's was slated to open a brand-new restaurant in a portion of the former Sears space, but construction was delayed due to the COVID-19 pandemic. The restaurant finally opened in 2021.

=== 2026 shooting ===
On October 30, 2026, one person was killed and six others were injured, three critically, in a mass shooting inside the Spirit Halloween location within the former Best Buy space at the mall. The authorities have not identified a suspect. As of November 2026 law enforcement has a person of interest related to the mass shooting at Solano Town Center.
