= Mershops Weberstown =

Coordinates: 37.99481°N 121.31174°W

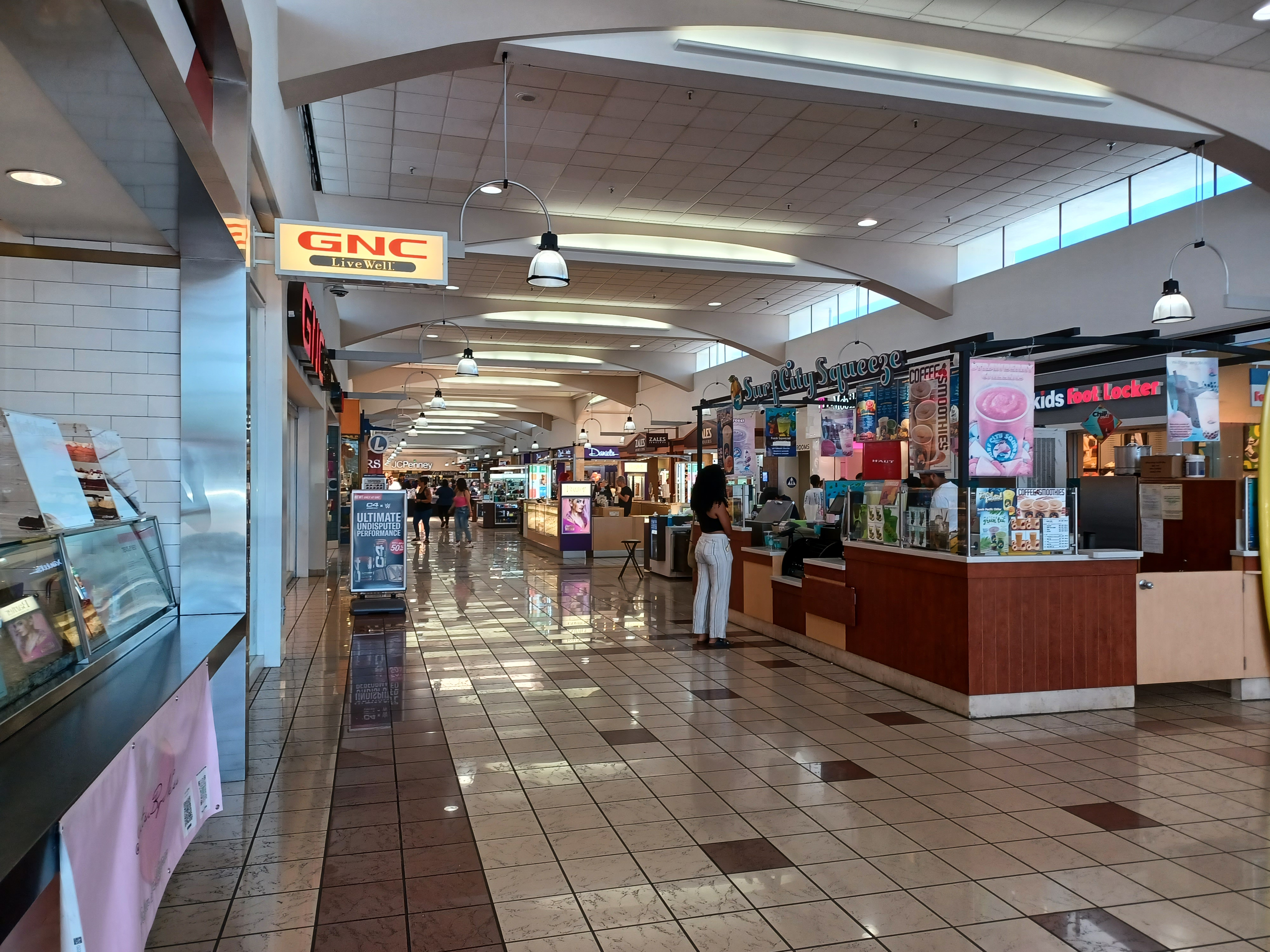
- Interior of Mershops Weberstown in Stockton, California
- Location: Stockton, California
- Address: 4950 Pacific Avenue
- Opened: 1966; 60 years ago
- Previous names: Weberstown Shopping Center (1966 - 1998) Weberstown Mall (1998 - 2025)
- Developer: Charles M. Weber III
- Manager: Spinoso Real Estate Group
- Owner: Mershops
- Num. of stores: 100+
- Num. of anchor tenants: 4 (1 vacant)
- Floor area: 855,800 square feet (80,000 m^{2})
- Floors: 1 (2 in Dillard's, JCPenney, and former Sears)
- Website: weberstown.com

Mershops Weberstown is a small enclosed shopping mall in Stockton, California, United States. Opened in 1966, it is anchored by JCPenney, Dillard's, and Barnes & Noble, with a vacant anchor last occupied by Sears. Weberstown also features Victoria's Secret and its sister store, Pink, as well as Old Navy and Five Below. It is owned by Mershops and managed by Spinoso Real Estate Group.

Prior to 2022, Mershops Weberstown was one of two enclosed shopping malls in Stockton, the other being Sherwood Mall, which is located next door. Sherwood was redeveloped into a conventional shopping center and was renamed Sherwood Place. As a result, Weberstown became the city's lone remaining enclosed shopping mall.

== History ==
=== Opening ===
Charles M. Weber III built the Weberstown Shopping Center in 1966. The original anchors were Sears and Weinstock's.

=== 1990s ===
Old Navy opened one of its first locations at the mall in 1995, taking over a spot vacated by Pier 1 Imports. In 1996, the Weinstock's store closed when its parent company, Broadway Stores, was acquired the year before by Federated Department Stores, parent company of Macy's, which already had an existing store at Sherwood Mall next door. Two years later, it was purchased by Dillard's to become that chain's first California location. Barnes & Noble moved into the mall in 1997, replacing a store nearby. A year later, Glimcher Realty Trust purchased the mall and the mall was renovated and renamed to Weberstown Mall.

=== 2000s and 2010s ===
The mall's JCPenney store was slated for closure in 2000, but the decision to close was later overturned.

H&M opened a store in Weberstown in 2014. It was shuttered in 2022.

=== 2020s ===
Sears announced that it will be closing their store at Weberstown Mall. When it closed on August 16, 2024, the Sears store was one of four remaining in California and ten remaining in the continental United States.

In April 2025, Washington Prime Group (WPG) which had acquired the Weberstown Mall and Glimcher’s portfolio in 2015 from Glimcher Realty Trust, announced that it will be selling the rest of their portfolio, which included Weberstown Mall.

In August 2025, Mershops purchased the Weberstown Mall from Washington Prime Group (WPG) for $50 million. Because of this acquisition, the Weberstown Mall was rebranded it as Mershops Weberstown in line with the other Mershops centers.
