= NewPark Mall =

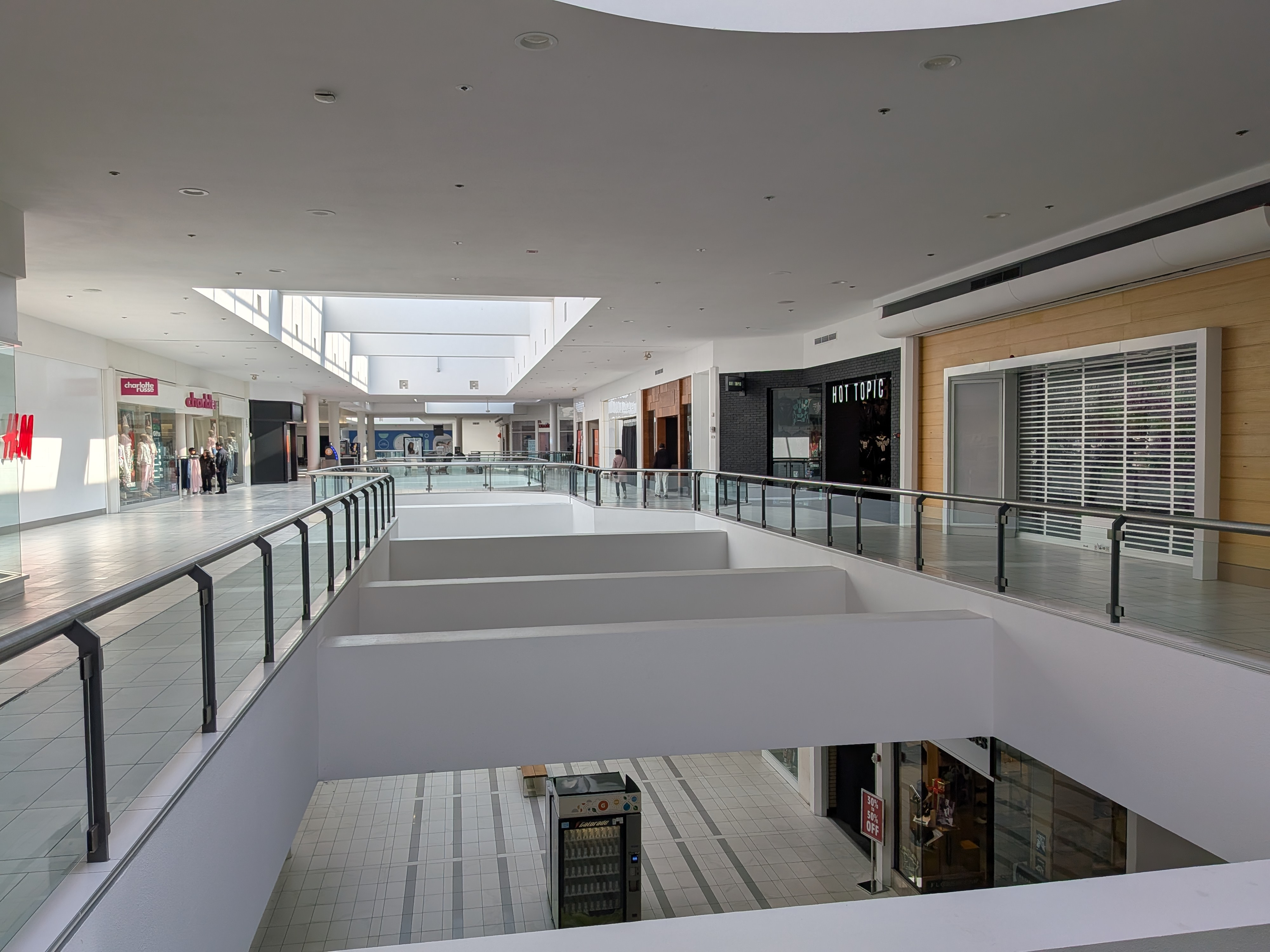
- Interior of the mall in 2025
- Location: Newark, California
- Coordinates: 37.526337°N 122.000792°W
- Address: 2086 Newpark Mall Rd
- Opened: August 6, 1980; 46 years ago
- Developer: R.H. Macy & Co. and Homart Development
- Manager: GGP
- Owner: GGP
- Architect: ELS Architecture and Urban Design
- Num. of stores: 44
- Num. of anchor tenants: 3 (1 open, 2 coming soon, formerly 6)
- Floor area: 1,161,681 square feet (107,923.7 m^{2})
- Floors: 2
- Parking: 5,000+
- Public transit: AC Transit Routes 200, 216, 281
- Website: www.newparkmall.com

NewPark Mall is a 1,161,681 square feet (107,923.7 m^{2}) super-regional mall in Newark, California. The mall opened on August 6, 1980 and at one point housed over 140 retailers, but the number of stores has declined to just over 40 as of 2025. It serves the Tri-City area (Fremont, Newark and Union City). The Mall underwent extensive renovations that were completed in early 2017. Among the additions are a 12-screen AMC movie complex with an IMAX screen and an elaborate new glass-walled restaurant area with views through the entire property.

The Marin Farmers Markets nonprofit organization operates a farmers market on the Mall property on Sunday. The Mall is adjacent to the Newark campus of Ohlone College and Newark Memorial High School.

== History ==
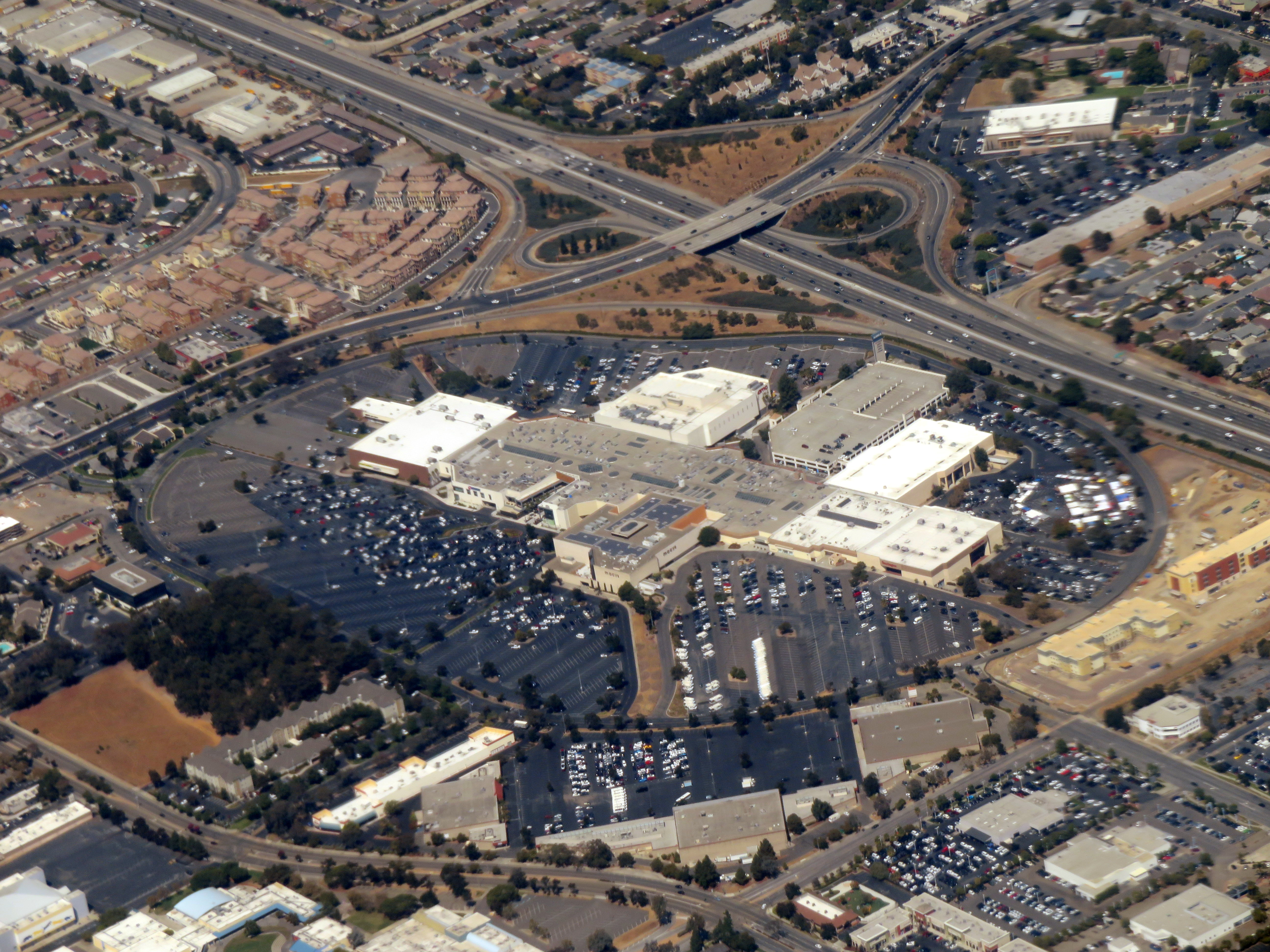
Aerial view of NewPark Mall in September 2018

NewPark Mall opened in 1980 with Macy's and Sears. A 1985 expansion added Mervyn's, which relocated from the Fremont Hub. Emporium-Capwell was added as in 1989 (having just relocated from next to Washington Hospital, now Washington West), followed by JCPenney in 1991. The Emporium store closed and became Target in 1996. Old Navy, which also moved from Fremont Hub, was added in 2000. It closed in 2005 and became Steve & Barry's in 2007. After Mervyn's closed in 2007, it became Burlington Coat Factory in 2010. At one point in the 2000s, the mall had over 140 stores.

Target relocated to the Pacific Commons Shopping Center in Fremont, California in 2012 and was replaced by AMC Theatres on January 28, 2016. In 2015, Sears Holdings spun off 235 properties, including the Sears at NewPark Mall, into Seritage Growth Properties.

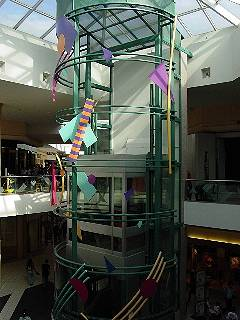
NewPark Mall main elevator pre-2017 remodel.

Two pizza restaurants opened in 2017 as part of the ongoing renovations taking place at NewPark Mall. On June 28, 2018, Sears announced that its store would be closing as part of a plan to close 78 stores nationwide. The store closed in September 2018. JCPenney closed in April 2019 as part of a plan to close 27 underperforming stores. Burlington also moved to Pacific Commons Shopping Center in 2020.

In July 2021, The Newark City Council and Brookfield Properties approved plans for a 319-unit apartment complex on the Mall's property along with a new 162,000 square-feet Costco on the southeast side of the Mall at the former JCPenney and Burlington Coat Factory site. The Costco store had a grand opening on November 18, 2023.

On January 9, 2025, it was announced that Macy's would be closing as part of a plan to close 66 stores nationwide. The store closed in March 2025.

As of 2025, the mall contains AMC Theatres, Jack's Restaurant & Bar, and 24 Hour Fitness, and has a little over 40 retailers.

In June 2026, it was announced that the former Macy's department store at the mall is set to be the new home of T&T Supermarket, as the Canadian grocery chain continues to expand into California. Tina Lee, CEO of T&T Supermarket, confirmed the new grocery store is in the works. Lee said it will be the largest California location to date at more than 72,600 square feet. The new grocery store is expected to open in late 2027.

The former Sears building and its parking lot were proposed as the new site for multiple apartment complexes and other mixed-use developments that are planned for the site. This new development would include green space and a reconfigured parking area. Developments are currently ongoing.

== Location ==
The NewPark Mall sits adjacent to the interchange of Interstate 880 and Mowry Avenue in the eastern part of Newark. Several hotels are located along the ring road that surrounds the mall.

== Public transit ==
The mall is served by AC Transit bus routes 200, 216, and 281. All three routes provide connection to the Union City BART station, while routes 200 & 216 also provide a connection to the Fremont BART station.
