= Canal Area, San Rafael, California =

Two neighborhoods of San Rafael, California, US

Coordinates: 37°57′45″N 122°30′7″W

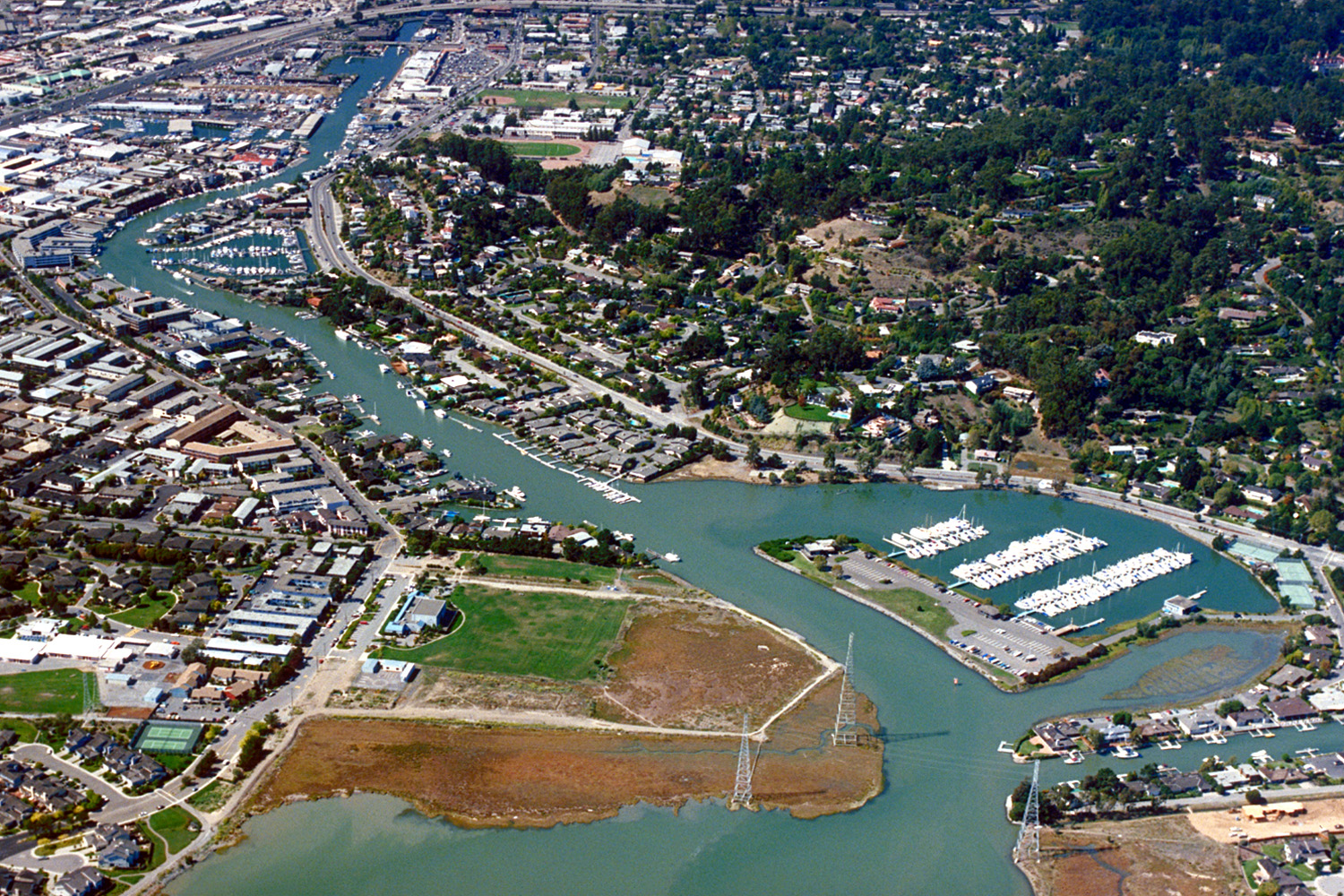
Aerial view of the San Rafael Canal, looking west. The northern tip of the Canal Area is on the left, with Pickleweed Park in the central foreground.

The Canal Area comprises two neighborhoods of San Rafael, California, designated by the city as the "Canal Waterfront" and the "Canal." The Canal Area is bounded on the east by San Francisco Bay, on the north by the San Rafael Canal and on the south and west by Highways 101 and I-580 and by San Quentin Ridge. Land use is split almost evenly between residential and non-residential (commercial/industrial) uses. The Canal Area provides a substantial portion of the low-income housing in Marin County, one of the most affluent counties in the United States, along with Marin City. It is also the location of transportation and waste management facilities serving Marin County and the North Bay. The Canal area is also one of the most segregated neighborhoods in Marin County, with more than a 90% Hispanic population and less than 5% white non-Hispanic population.

== Demographics and housing ==
Most of San Rafael's low-income residents live in the Canal Area, along with many affluent residents. There is at least one concern (on Harbor Way) that rents slips for boats that people can live aboard legally. The more affluent residents live in the houses constructed in the 1960s right on the Canal and in two housing developments in the eastern part of the Canal's residential area: Baypoint Lagoons (constructed in the late 1990s) and Spinnaker Point (constructed earlier). Some real-estate agents refer to these two developments as being in "East San Rafael", to avoid the stigma of the name "Canal Area". This area provides a location for workers who hold low-income jobs that are essential to the functioning of the community to live close to their place of employment. Although the majority of residents in this area are low-income workers, most of the apartments in which they live are neither subsidized nor less expensive than comparable apartments elsewhere in San Rafael.

== Health Inequities ==
About 46.8% of the residents in Canal are living below 200% of the federal income and poverty level. Because of this Canal residents spend more than 30% of their income on rent. In 2020 this overcrowding caused a health inequity that not many foresaw. The Canal area saw a 20% COVID-19 positivity rate, which was more than the county average. This made very clear that the residents of this area face many detrimental effects of societal issues. Nearly more than half of the COVID-19 cases in the county were concentrated in this area. During COVID-19 many of the residents of the Canal area were also essential workers which is what contributed to the high COVID cases within this area. These health inequities in Marin County are of importance because the residents of the area oftentimes don't have access to healthcare, and actually 36% of residents don't have health insurance. But in Canal this isn't the only health inequity that is present. Canal residents are estimated to live nine years less than residents of Ross, California which is only about a 15-minute drive from Canal.

== Parks and public facilities ==
Between the newer housing developments and the Bay is a paved path called Shoreline Park, which is a scenic place to take a walk or a bike ride. Along with a bike path owned by the Spinnaker Point Homeowner's Association (which forms the West side of the square), Shoreline Park forms a square 0.25 miles (400 m) long and 0.25 miles (400 m) wide. The easiest way to visit Shoreline Park is to visit Pickleweed Park, then to walk east along the north side of the square. Pickleweed Park is home to a large community center and to soccer fields and a playground.

There are many dozen, perhaps hundreds, of stores, shops, offices and other commercial operations in the West and the South of the area.

== Large land users ==
Industrial Light and Magic occupied many tens of thousands of square feet of office space here and in 1997 built a "main stage" here for the production of movie special effects. The main stage is still in use, but most of the office space was moved to San Francisco in 2005.

=== Transportation and waste processing facilities ===
The southeastern portion of the Canal Area, between I-580 and San Quentin Ridge, is the base for several transportation and waste processing facilities serving large portions of Marin County. They include:

- Central Marin Sanitation Agency, 1301 Anderson Drive
- Golden Gate Transit bus yard and maintenance facility
- Marin Recycling Center
- Marin Resource Recovery Center
- Marin Sanitary Service and its transfer station
- United Parcel Service

=== Closed landfills ===
The "East San Rafael" area (the eastern portion of the Canal Area between the Bay and San Quentin Ridge), was home to most of the garbage disposal sites in central Marin County, including the following (links are to the California Integrated Waste Management Board, Solid Waste Information System, which is continuously updated):

- Ghilotti Brothers Disposal Site, Morphew Street, closed
- San Quentin Disposal Site, 1615 Francisco Boulevard, closed 1988
- Horst Hanf Landfill/Bayview Park, Francisco Boulevard, closed
- Bellam Blvd Landfill AKA San Rafael Landfill, closed 1988
- Francisco Landfill, Pelican Way at Kerner Boulevard, unpermitted

== See also ==
- Landfill in the United States
