= San Francisco Centre =

Defunct mall in San Francisco, California

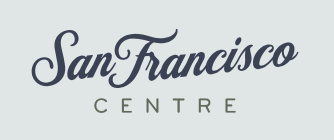
- Coordinates: 37°47′2″N 122°24′26″W
- Address: 865 Market Street; San Francisco, California; 94103
- Opened: October 1988; 38 years ago
- Closed: January 24, 2026; 9 months ago
- Developer: Sheldon Gordon Group Holdings
- Manager: JLL Properties
- Owner: Goldman Sachs and JPMorgan Chase
- Num. of stores: 27 (at peak)
- Num. of anchor tenants: 2 (both vacant)
- Floor area: 1,564,533 sq ft (145,349.9 m^{2}) (retail); 250,000 sq ft (23,000 m^{2}) (office)
- Floors: 9 (5 in former Nordstrom, 5 in former Bloomingdale's)
- Public transit: Powell Street station

San Francisco Centre is a defunct enclosed shopping mall located in San Francisco, California, United States. The mall opened in 1988, was significantly expanded in 2006, and closed in 2026. There are two vacant anchors, formerly occupied by Nordstrom and Bloomingdale's. The mall formerly connected directly to the Powell Street station via an underground entrance on the concourse floor.

== History ==
=== Early years ===
Originally developed by Sheldon Gordon (co-developer of The Forum Shops at Caesars and Beverly Center), the nine-story mall opened in October 1988 as San Francisco Shopping Centre with approximately 500,000 square feet (46,000 m^{2}) of space, the then-largest Nordstrom store (350,000 square feet (33,000 m^{2})) on the top several floors, the first spiral escalator in the United States, and a connector to the adjoining Emporium-Capwell flagship store.

After a slow start, it soon became one of the top-performing shopping centers in the country. In 1996, the adjoining Emporium (it had dropped the Capwell name by then) was shuttered in the wake of Federated Department Stores' buyout of its parent, Broadway Stores. The vacated store was temporarily used as a Macy's furniture store while it renovated its Union Square flagship in 1997.

In May 1997, Urban Shopping Centers, Inc., a real estate investment trust, acquired a half-interest and management of the center. This was followed by Urban's own buyout by Rodamco North America N.V. (a European property firm primarily invested in the United States) in October 2000 and Rodamco's subsequent sale to a consortium including the Westfield Group in January 2002. Westfield acquired its initial 50% stake in the center at this time and soon bought the rest.

=== Expansion ===
In February 2003, Forest City, which had acquired redevelopment rights to the long-vacant Emporium store from Federated, reached an agreement with Westfield to jointly redevelop the two properties.

The newly expanded mixed-use Westfield San Francisco Centre opened on September 28, 2006. Designed by the Kohn Pedersen Fox architectural firm, with Kevin Kennon as the Design Principal, the mall included Bloomingdale's West Coast flagship store, a nine-screen Century Theatres multiplex theater featuring 2 XD screens, a 30,000 square feet (2,800 m^{2}) Bristol Farms gourmet supermarket, and the Downtown Campus for San Francisco State University in its 1.5 million+ ft² of space.

The redevelopment cost $440 million. Only the front façade and landmark dome of the original structure were preserved; the rest of the structure was completely gutted and replaced. Upon completion of the project, Forest City became an equity partner and along with Westfield assumed responsibility for day-to-day management. In March 2009, it was announced that Westfield San Francisco Centre shopping center was named as one of nine finalists vying for the title of "World’s Best Shopping Center" as part of the International Council of Shopping Centers Inc.’s inaugural "Best-of-the-Best" awards. Westfield San Francisco Centre ended up winning the "Best-of-the-Best" award for design and development; it was one of only four shopping centers in the world to win.

In 2011, the San Francisco Police Department considered putting a substation in the mall to prevent rampant shoplifting.

The Bristol Farms store closed on January 27, 2017. In the summer of 2021, a Shake Shack opened in the former Bristol Farms space.

=== Decline and closure ===
In June 2023, Westfield and Brookfield announced that, due to plunging post-pandemic sales, occupancy and foot traffic at the mall, they would stop making loan payments and cede the property to their lenders. The Century Theatres multiplex closed on June 15, 2023. In July 2023, the Westfield branding was removed from the mall, which was renamed San Francisco Centre. Nordstrom closed on August 27, 2023, leaving Bloomingdale's as the only anchor store, at which point the mall's occupancy level had fallen to 55%. Mayor London Breed suggested that the mall could be redeveloped for another use, such as a soccer stadium, while others suggested it be used as food halls, pickleball courts, and animal shelters.

In September 2023, the owners of the American Eagle store filed a lawsuit claiming mall management had failed to "maintain the Common Areas at the mall which has poisoned public opinion" about safety.

In October 2023, Gregg Williams, the principal receiver of Trident Pacific (a receivership firm), was appointed by a judge to take possession, custody, and control of the mall.

By November 2023, and into early 2024, many stores had begun to close at the mall. This included LEGO, two-level Adidas, Hollister, Aldo, Madewell and sister chain J.Crew, and Lucky Brand. The mall's occupancy level fell to only 25%, and its valuation had plunged 75% from its 2016 level of $1.2 billion to only $290 million.

On February 29, 2024, San Francisco Centre was renamed Emporium Centre San Francisco, then in October, eight months after announcing the new name, management reverted to the original San Francisco Centre name.

Throughout 2024, more stores continued to close as a result of decline, this time L'Occitane, Sephora, American Eagle, and Ted Baker. When American Eagle closed, with over three years remaining on its lease, it sued the mall's receivers, alleging that the building was not being maintained, leading to vermin and crime problems within the mall. The receiver threatened to countersue the store for breaking its lease. AE had already sued Westfield the previous year, alleging they had allowed the mall to decay as well. A foreclosure auction was scheduled for November 14. In January 2025, the mall's Michael Kors store closed. Seven more stores closed in early April 2025, including luxury watch stores Rolex, Bucherer, Panerai and IWC Schaffhausen, as well as Sunglass Hut, Kate Spade and Coach.

On January 21, 2025, Macy's, Inc. announced that the Bloomingdale's anchor store would close. It closed in April 2025, leaving the mall without any anchor stores, rendering the mall a dead mall. With the lack of foot traffic, the restaurants in the mall reported that online food ordering and food delivery made up more than a third of their business.

The APM Monaco jewelry store closed in April 2025, while the Swarovski jewelry store and John Varvatos clothing store announced their closures in May.

A $625.6 million lien auction was originally set for June 17, 2025, in what would have been a fourth attempt to sell the beleaguered property. It was postponed to August 21.

In August 2025, The New York Times described the dying mall as "a national symbol of the city's pandemic-battered downtown". The Times contrasted the decline of San Francisco Centre against the renaissance of Stonestown Galleria on the other side of the city, and pointed to the mall's famous spiral escalator as a former symbol of its ascendancy that now stands as a symbol of its "downward spiral".

In November 2025, Goldman Sachs and JPMorgan Chase foreclosed on a $560 million loan and bought the property for $134 million.

In December 2025, it was announced that Shake Shack would be closing at the San Francisco Centre, leaving the entire food court vacant, and leaving Panda Express as the last remaining restaurant in the entire mall. It was soon after announced that H&M would also be closing on January 11, 2026, leaving all of the original businesses from the 2006 renovation gone, as well as the property at a 95% vacancy rate. On January 14, 2026, Panda Express permanently closed, leaving the mall without any dining options.

On January 20, 2026, an employee at the mall's final remaining tenant, ECCO, confirmed that their store, along with the mall itself, would be permanently closing on January 26, with the remaining entrance from Powell Street Station being sealed off to customers. The mall closed two days early, on January 24, 2026.

In March 2026, commercial and residential developers Presidio Bay Ventures and Prado Group were selected to buy the 1.15 million-square-foot main building of the vacant mall for $130 million, but they withdrew in July, after negotiations with the San Francisco Unified School District, which owns some of the property, stalled. In June 2026, an unnamed buyer with plans for an AI data center bid on both the mall and the 350,000-square-foot vacant Bloomingdale's anchor store, which is separately owned by Macy's. Their bid was unsuccessful.

In October 2026, it was reported that a new buyer for the main building had been selected, Seven Equity Group, with closing expected in the first quarter of 2027. It was also reported that the vacant Bloomingdale's anchor was now being pursued by Austin, Texas-based B3 Commercial Management.

== Layout ==
The shopping center is nine stories tall and integrated into nearby buildings. The basement level was directly connected to two entrances for Powell Street station, which is served by Bay Area Rapid Transit (BART) and Muni Metro trains. The mall's owners paid $750,000 annually to BART to maintain access to the station. The San Francisco Unified School District receives lease payments as an owner of part of the land.

=== Former anchors and major tenants ===
- San Francisco State University Downtown Campus (107,000 ft²; opened 2006, closed 2021)
- Nordstrom (350,000 ft²; opened 1988, closed August 27, 2023)
- Century Theatres & XD 9-screen multiplex (53,000 ft², closed June 15, 2023)
- Bloomingdale's (closed April 2025)

== Gallery ==
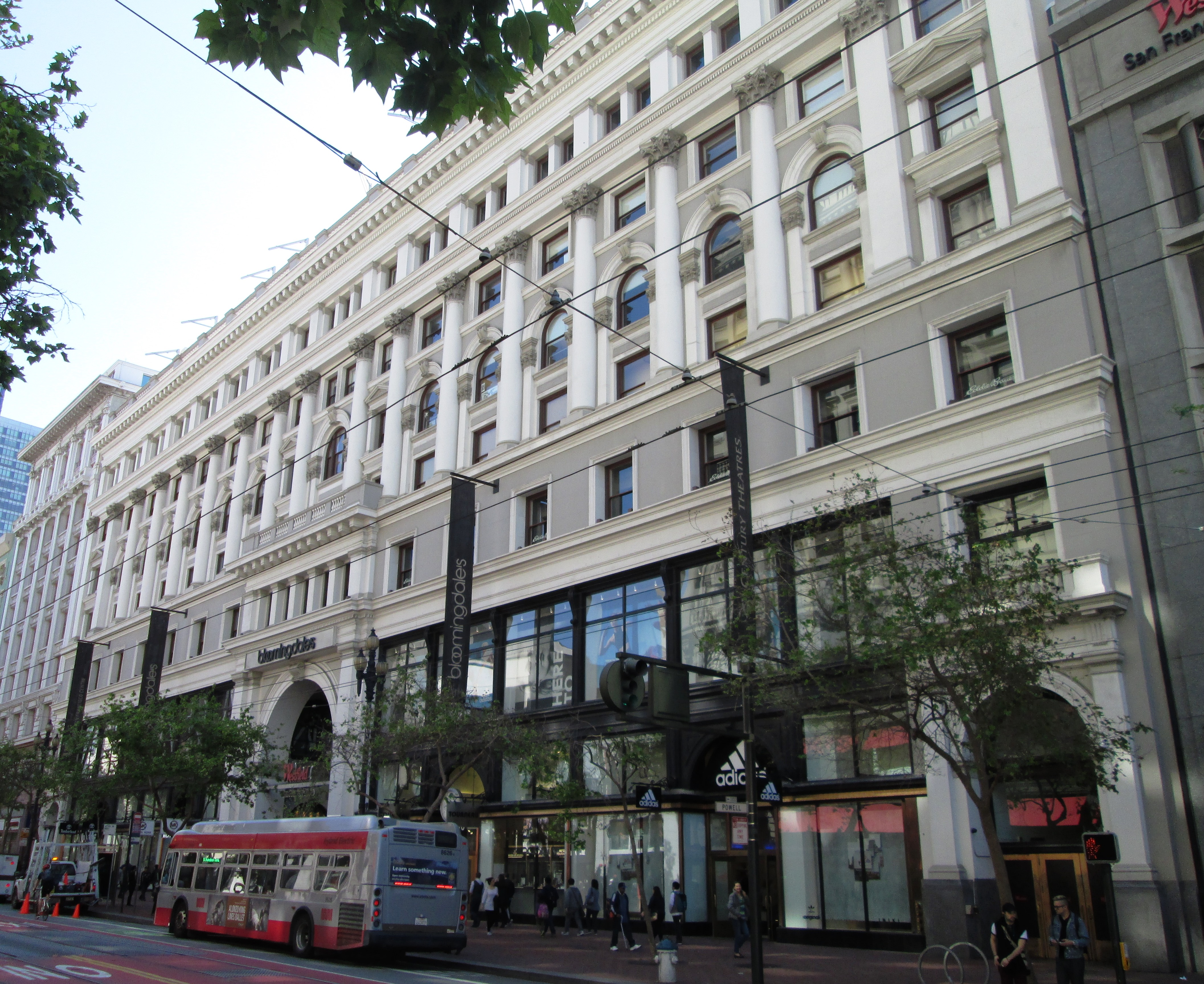
845 Market Street, anchored by the former Bloomingdale's

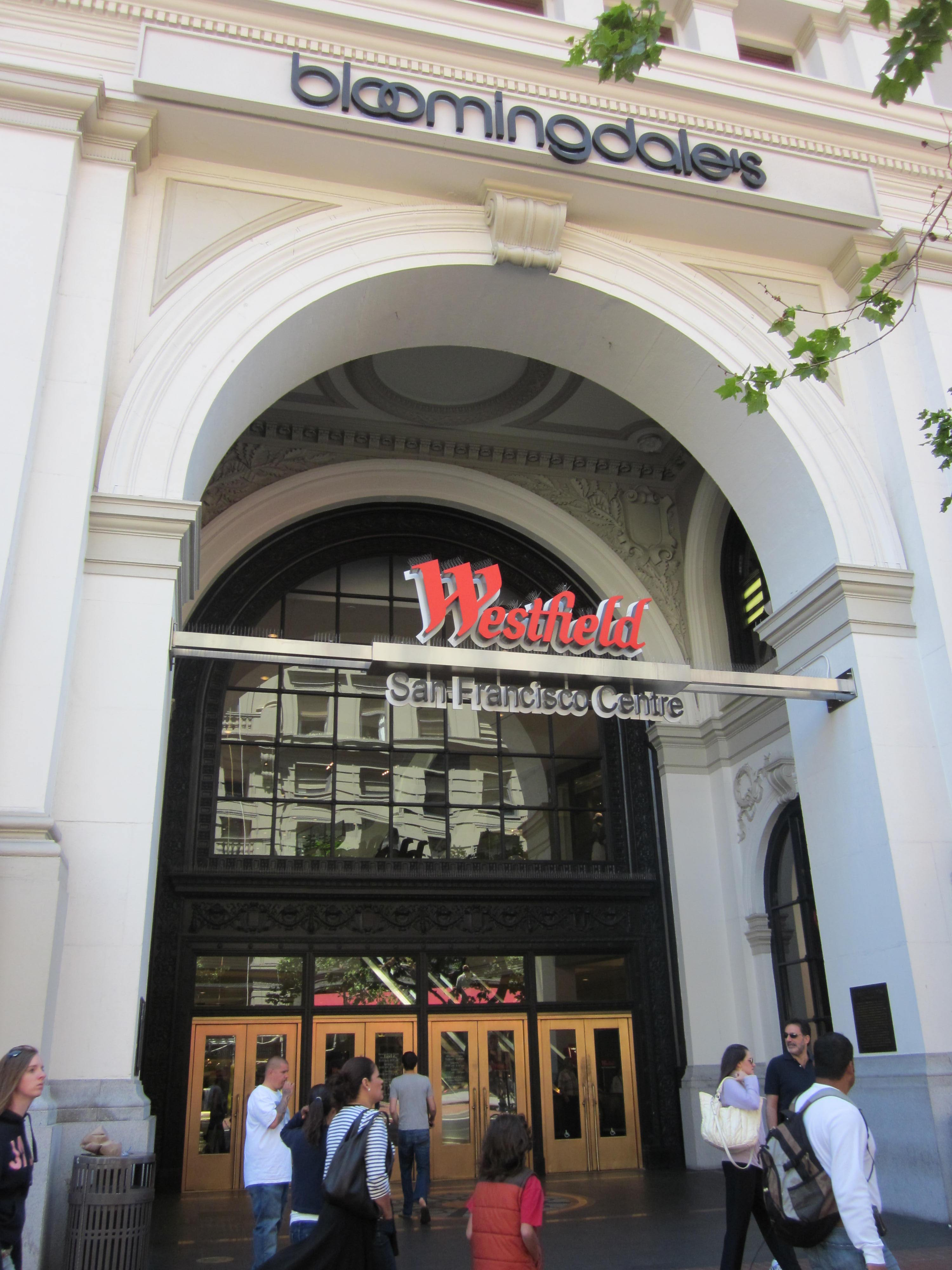
The entrance to 845 Market Street

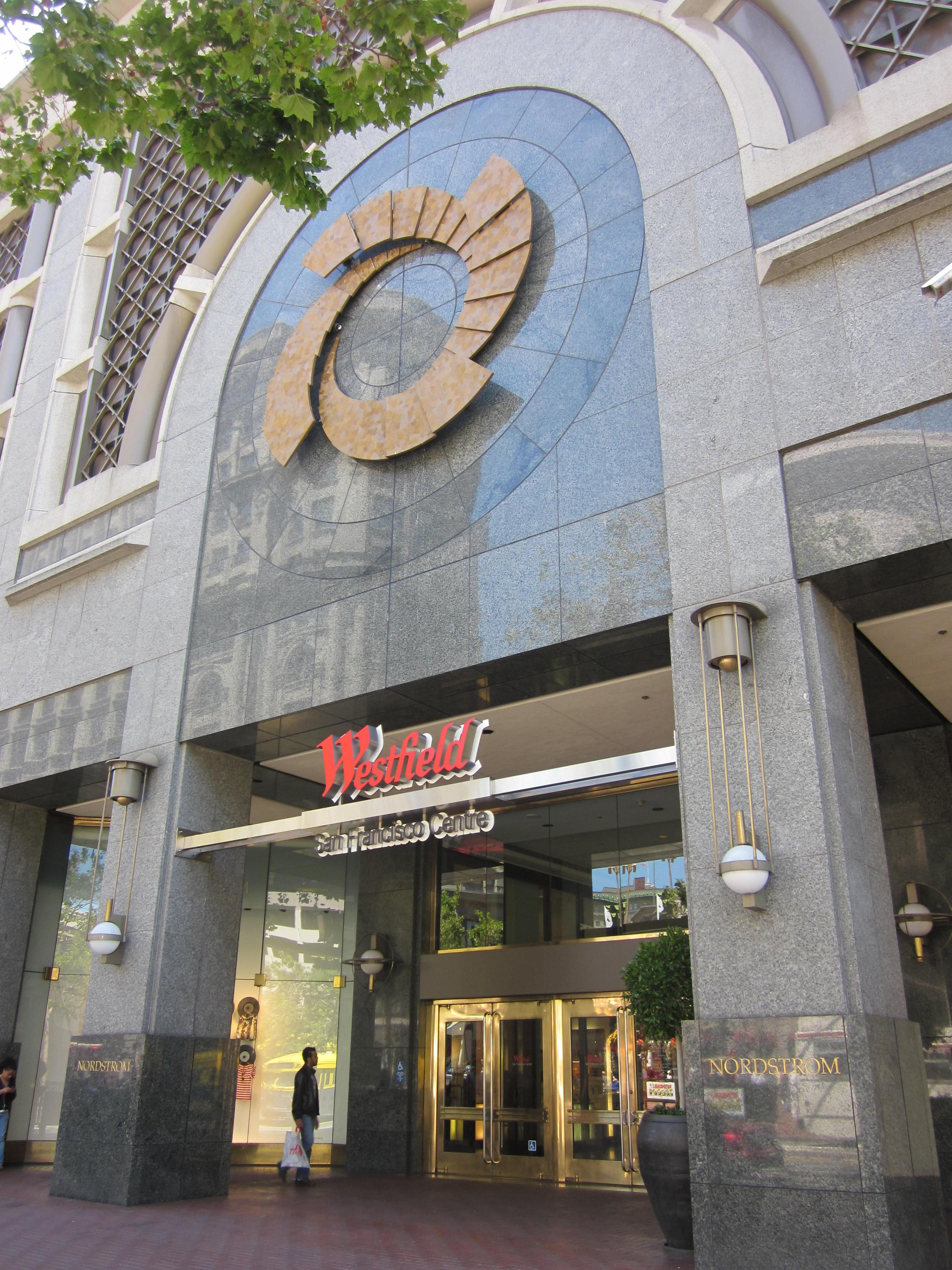
The entrance to 865 Market Street

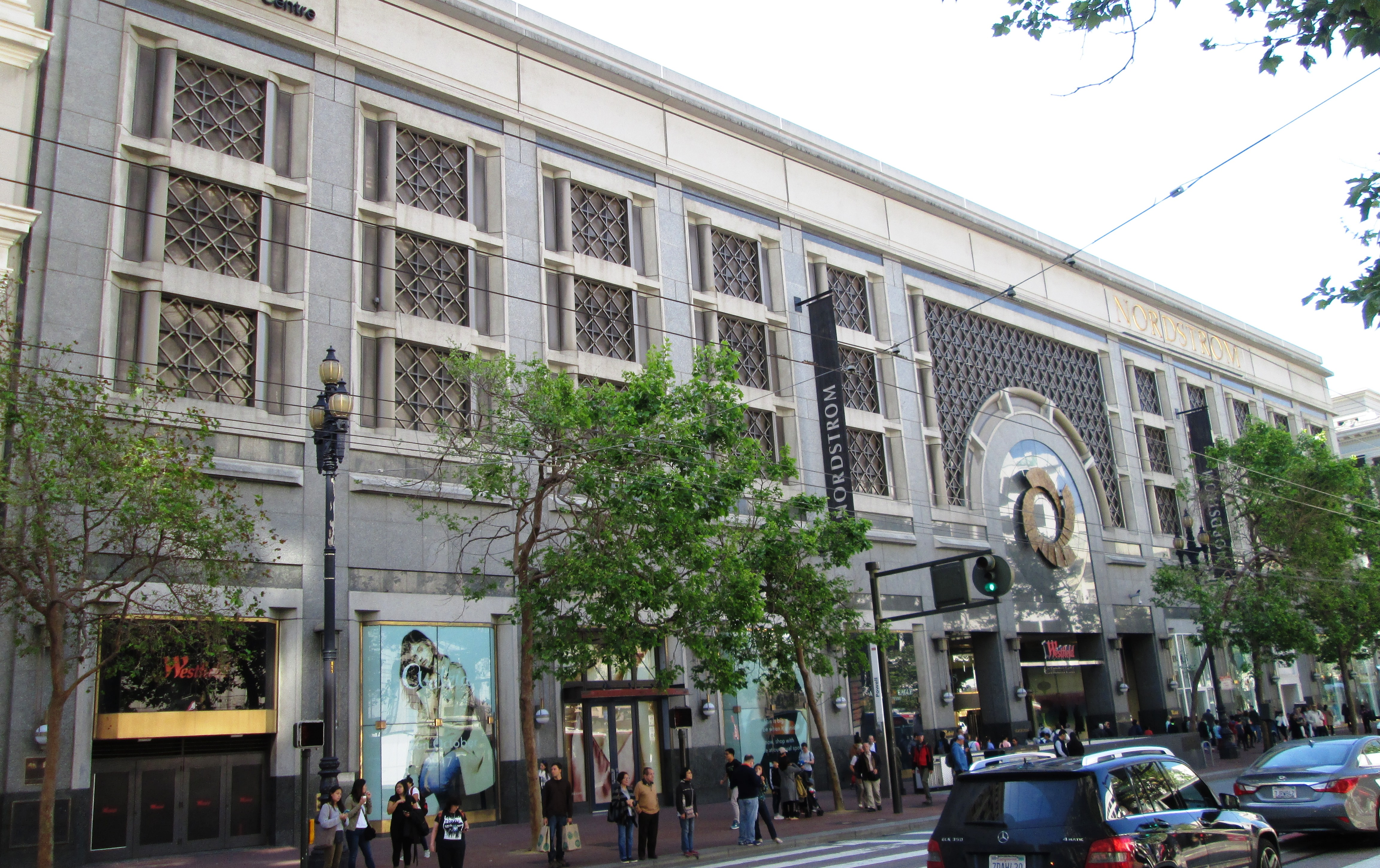
865 Market Street, anchored by the former Nordstrom

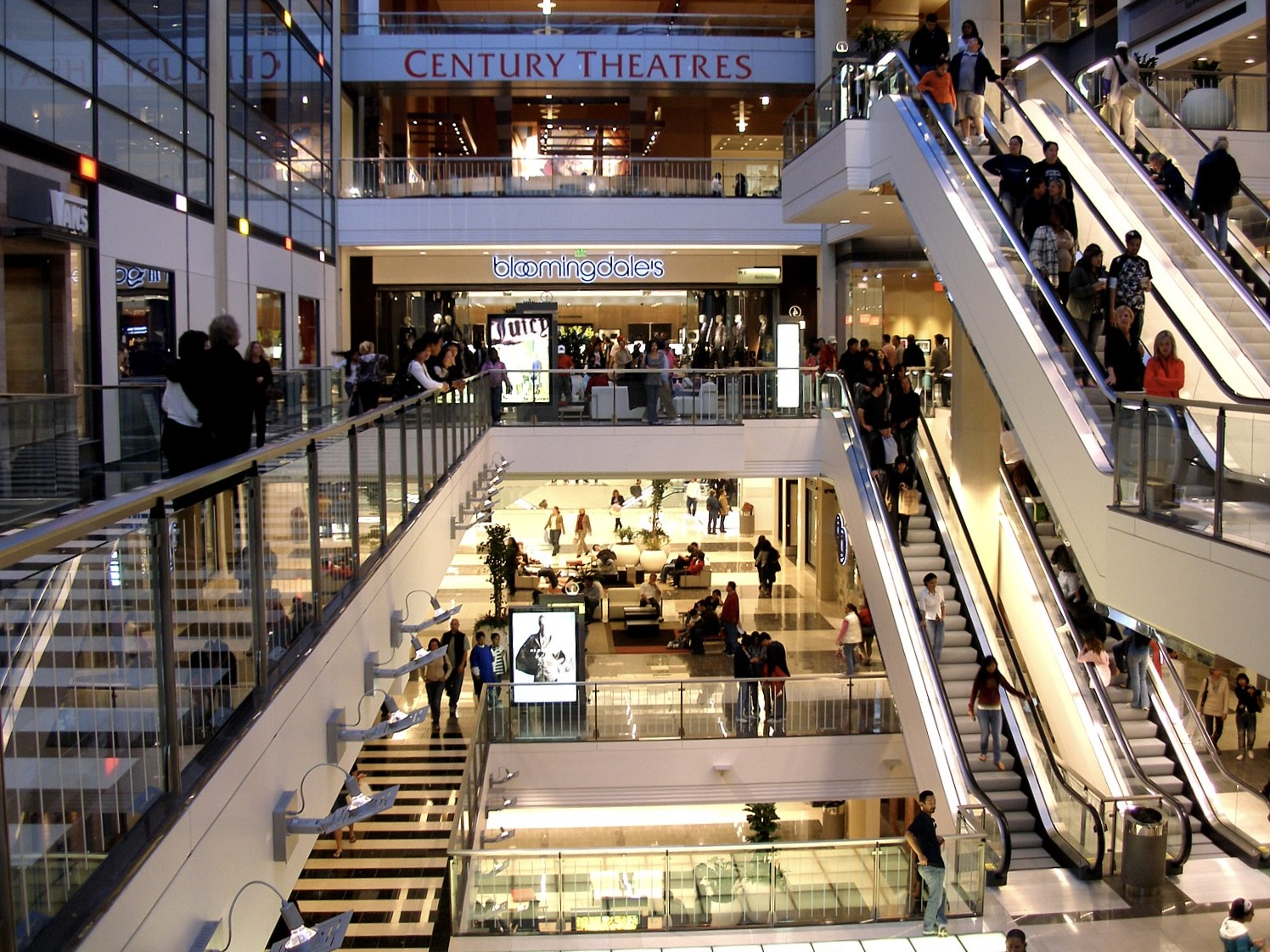
Mall interior three weeks after redevelopment and reopening, 2006

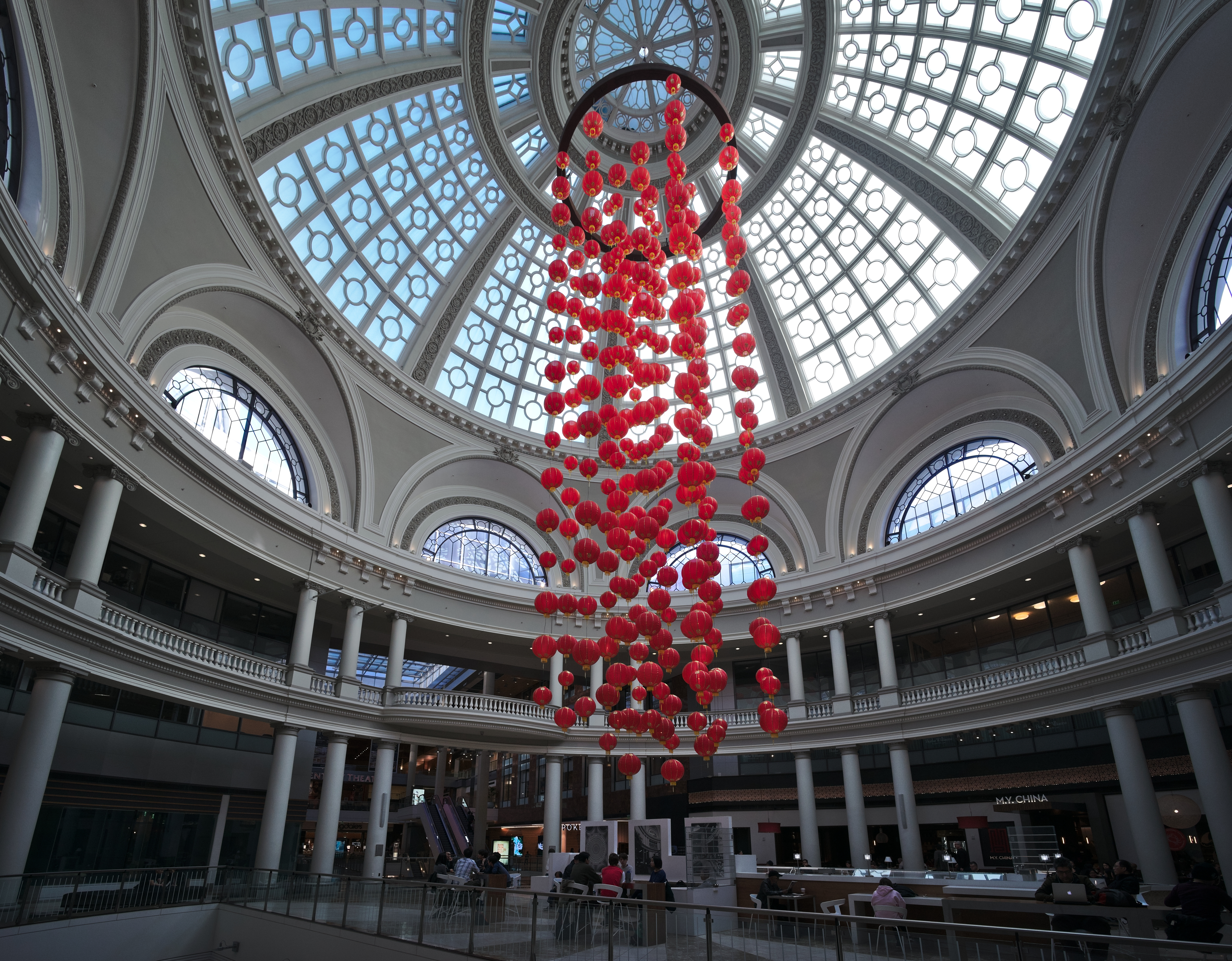
The dome within the shopping center

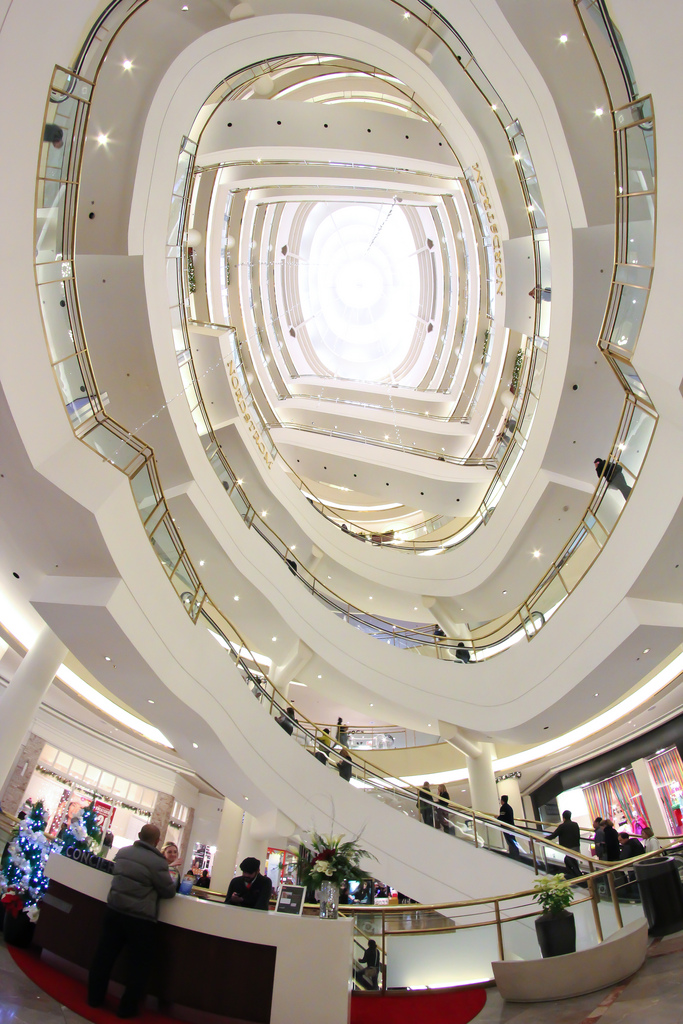
Interior atrium with curved escalators, 2011
