= Emporium Capwell =

American department store chain

Coordinates: 37.78442°N 122.40638°W

Emporium Capwell Co.
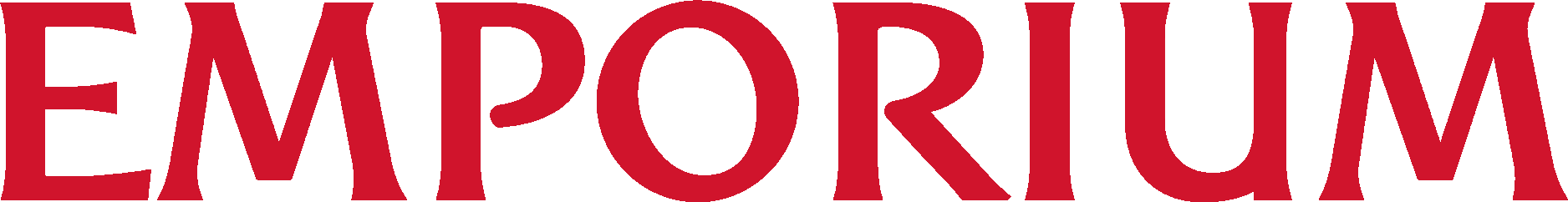

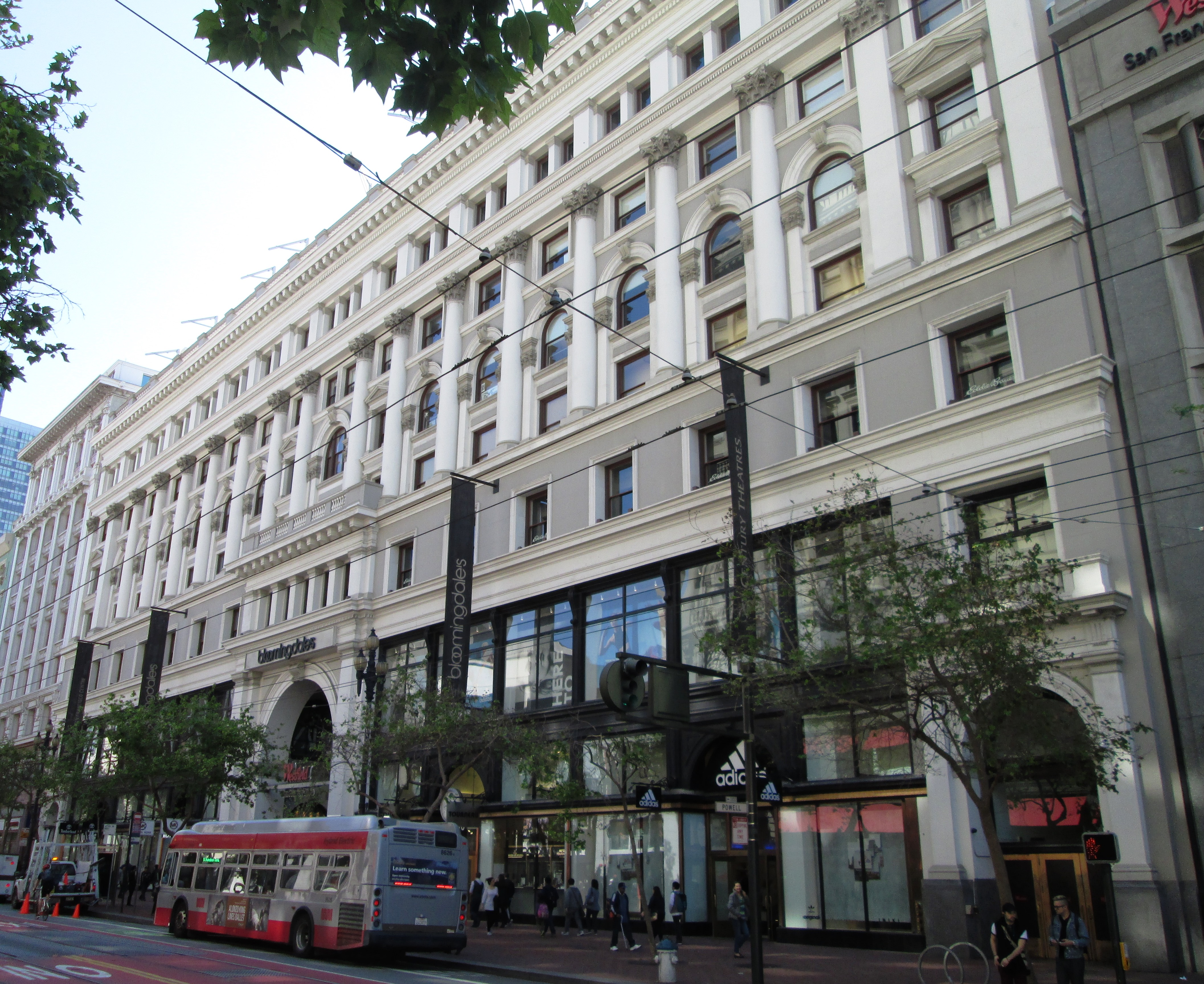
- Exterior of the former The Emporium flagship store in downtown San Francisco (2017)
- Trade name: Capwell's (1889–1980); The Emporium (1896–1980); Emporium–Capwell (1980–1990); Emporium (1990–1996)
- Type: Subsidiary
- Industry: Retail
- Genre: Department stores
- Founded: 1889; 137 years ago (Capwell's); 1896; 130 years ago (The Emporium); 1927; 99 years ago (Emporium Capwell Co.)
- Founder: Harris Cebert Capwell (Capwell's); Adolph Feist (The Emporium)
- Defunct: 1996; 30 years ago
- Fate: Acquisition by Federated Department Stores
- Successor: Macy's
- Headquarters: San Francisco, California, United States
- Area served: San Francisco Bay Area
- Parent: Carter Hawley Hale Stores (1970–1995); Federated Department Stores (1995–1996)

Emporium Capwell Co. was an American department store chain operating under the trade names Capwell's, The Emporium, Emporium–Capwell, and Emporium in the San Francisco Bay Area. Its predecessors both were founded in San Francisco, California; Capwell's in 1889 by Harris Cebert Capwell, and The Emporium in 1896 by Adolph Feist. They merged into the single Emporium Capwell Co. company in 1927, however, maintained their individual brands until 1980. The combined Emporium–Capwell stores were rebranded as Emporium in 1990, and after parent company Carter Hawley Hale Stores was acquired by Federated Department Stores in 1995, the remaining Emporium stores were converted to Macy's in 1996.

The Emporium flagship store on Market Street in San Francisco was a local institution for decades, and connected to the San Francisco Centre shopping mall that opened in 1988. It was briefly renamed the Emporium Centre San Francisco in recognition of local heritage in 2024.

== History ==
=== Establishments ===
In February, 1871, The Golden Rule Bazaar, was founded in San Francisco at 419 Kearny Street, by Ansley G. Davis and his brothers (Percy L., Eugene G., and Andrew M. ).

In 1889, Capwell founded his Oakland store under the name The Lace House and changed it to his own name two years later.

In 1896, The Emporium was a department store founded in San Francisco by Adolph Feist as a co-operative of individually owned shops in the leased Parrott Building, owned by Abby Parrott, a wealthy widow of a millionaire Gold Rush banker.

On 30 March 1897, Golden Rule Bazaar was incorporated by Andrew M. Davis, Henry Dernham, William Kaufmann, M. H. Hecht and Albert Dernham.

On 29 August 1897, an announcement in the San Francisco Call, on page 5, noted that the Golden Rule Bazaar was closing and would later reopen as the Emporium and Golden Rule Bazaar.

In 1897, Golden Rule Bazaar merged with the new Emporium Company, a business operated by Frederick W. Dohrmann (1842-1914), a German immigrant who arrived in California in the 1860s and had made a reputation in the general merchandise and flour milling industries in the Bay Area, in a huge new building at 835 Market Street in San Francisco.

In 1898, Dohrmann's son, A. B. C. Dohrman, became officially involved in day-to-day affairs and along with others was instrumental in the reorganization of the new Emporium; he was president of the company at the time of the elder Dorhmann's death in 1914.

In 1925, the Emporium bought a 32-acre property in Fairfax, California formerly owned by Charles Snowden Fairfax, 10th Lord Fairfax of Cameron, to create The Emporium Country Club for their 2,000 employees, it later became the Marin Town and Country Club.

=== Merger of Capwell's and The Emporium ===
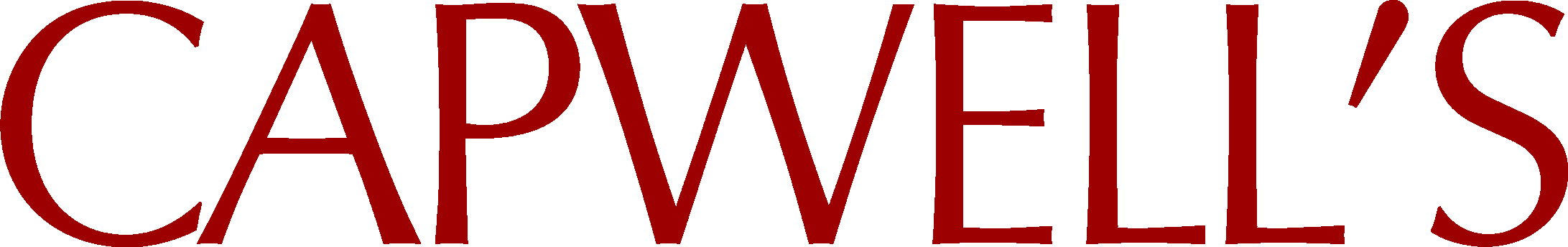
Capwell's logo

In 1927, the Emporium merged with the Oakland-based department store H.C. Capwell, forming a new holding company, Emporium Capwell Co., but retaining their respective identities.

In the years after World War II, as the population of the Bay Area increased tremendously and spread out far beyond the urban cores of Oakland and San Francisco, several suburban branches of The Emporium were opened in newly developed shopping malls, mainly in San Mateo, Marin, Solano, Sonoma and Santa Clara counties. Capwell's focused its postwar suburban expansion closer to Oakland, opening branch stores in southern Alameda County and Contra Costa County.

=== Acquisition by Carter Hawley Hale ===
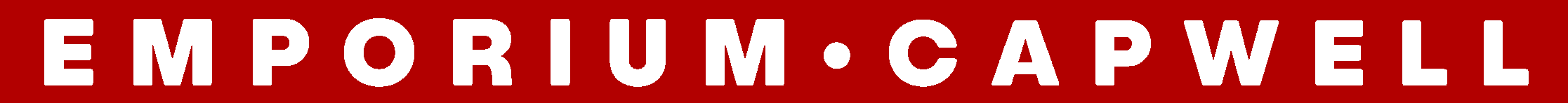
Emporium-Capwell final logo

In 1970, Broadway-Hale Stores, later Carter Hawley Hale Stores, acquired Emporium-Capwell Co., and consolidated its San Francisco Bay Area operation under the (still separate) Emporium and Capwell names, finally merging them in 1980 under the Emporium-Capwell name, later shortening the name to Emporium in 1990. In 1991, Emporium assumed operation of the Sacramento-based Weinstock's department store chain, which had a similar merchandising structure.

=== Conversion to Macy's ===
Finally in 1995 the chain and its parent (by then renamed Broadway Stores) were acquired by Federated Department Stores, which merged the Broadway, Emporium and Weinstock's stores with its own Macy's California and Bullock's stores to form Macy's West, renaming all the retained stores as Macy's. The Emporium location at Stanford Shopping Center was reopened by Federated's Bloomingdale's division in 1996, while after a decade of negotiation, bureaucratic red tape and intense physical reconstruction, the former flagship store of The Emporium on Market Street re-opened on September 28, 2006, as an expansion of the adjoining Westfield San Francisco Centre, which includes a new Bloomingdale's, the second-largest in the chain after its Manhattan flagship. The Emporium locations at The Shops at Tanforan and NewPark Mall became Target stores while Oakland, Hillsdale Shopping Center, and Solano Town Center locations became Sears. Almaden Plaza's location was subdivided into mixed retail use, with stores including Bed Bath & Beyond (now closed since 2023), Circuit City (now Buy Buy Baby), and Diddam's Party & Toy Store.

== Notable locations ==
=== The Emporium flagship store ===
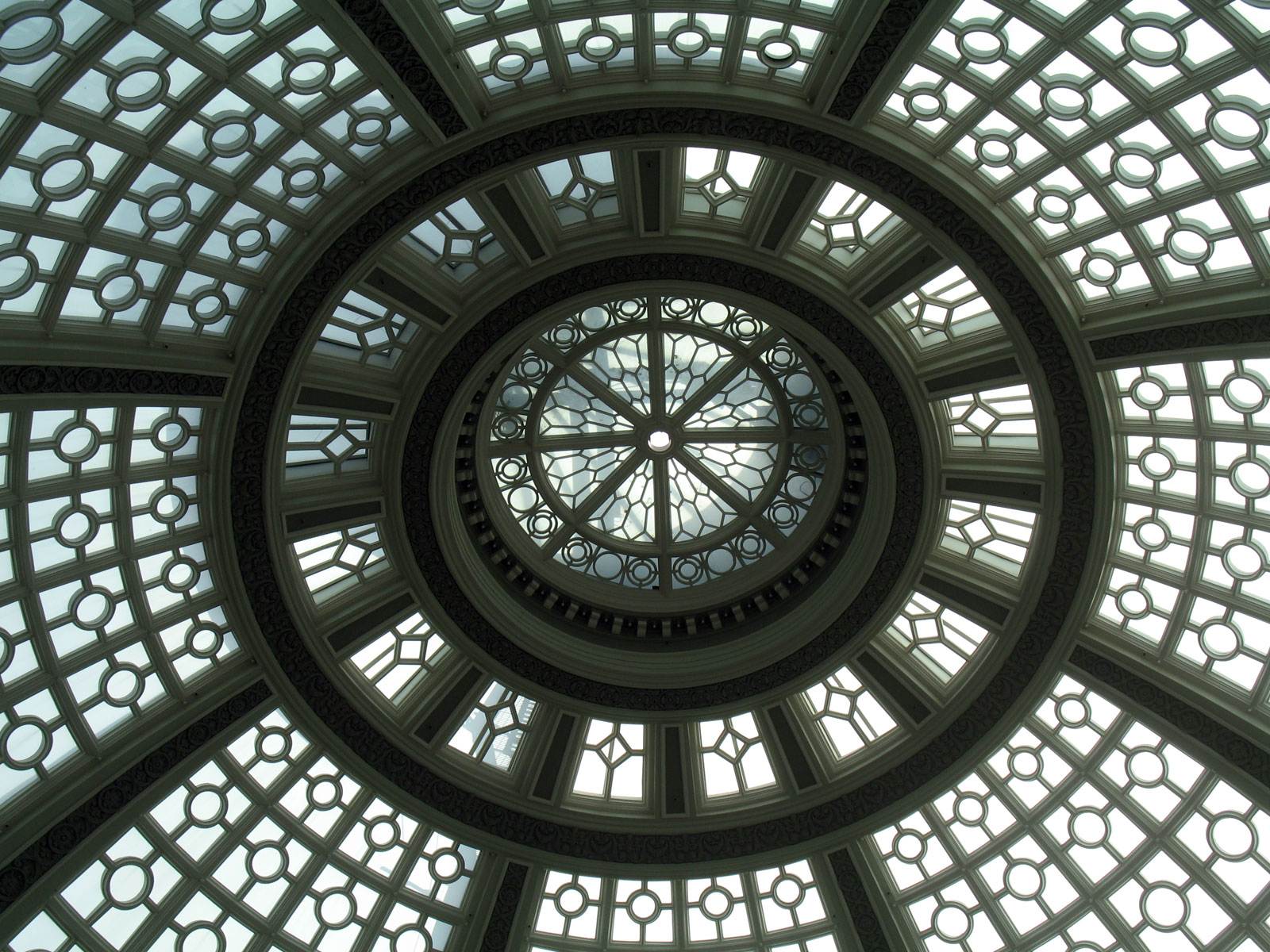
The dome at the old downtown San Francisco location

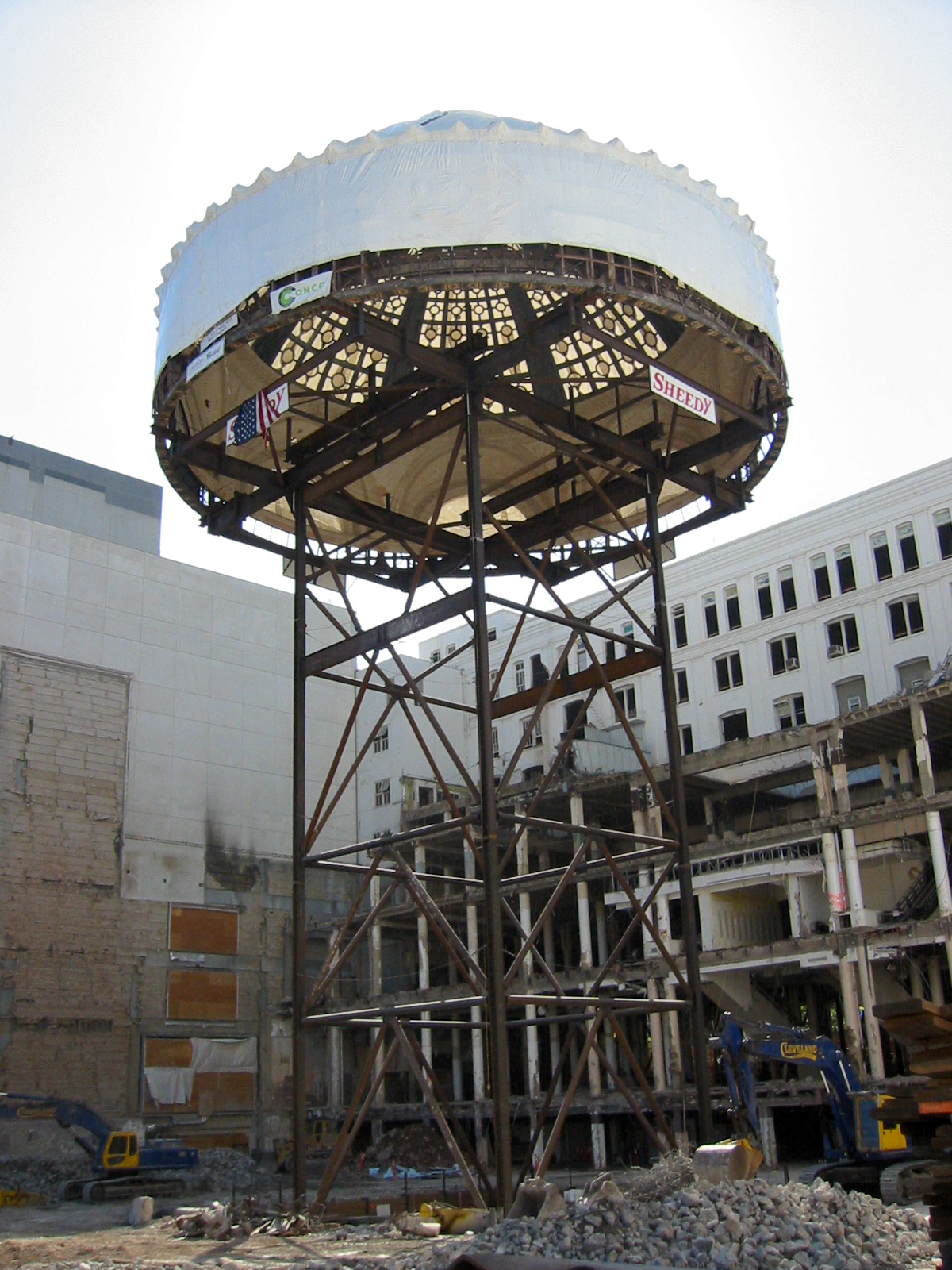
The dome during construction of Westfield San Francisco Centre Phase II

The flagship location at 835 Market Street, between 4th and 5th Streets, was a destination for generations of northern California shoppers. It was designed by San Francisco architect Albert Pissis, one of the first Americans to be trained at the École des Beaux Arts in Paris. It withstood the 1906 earthquake, but was destroyed by the subsequent fire and rebuilt in 1908. Many additions and renovations were made in the decades following.

In 1947, William H. Meyer, who began with Ringling Bros. and Barnum & Bailey Circus in 1919, founded Gold Coast Shows and opened his first rooftop attraction at the downtown San Francisco Emporium store.

It was also well known locally for the annual parade when Santa Claus arrived by stagecoach or cable car to open the holiday season.

In the late 1980s, the flagship Market Street store was connected to the new San Francisco Shopping Centre (known as Westfield San Francisco Centre until July of 2023), a nine-story indoor mall anchored by a flagship Nordstrom location. Nordstrom permanently closed on August 27, 2023. In July 2023, Westfield was removed from the signage and was known as San Francisco Centre. The Emporium location closed permanently in February 1996, and after some discussion regarding the historic preservation of the building's facade and other elements, was redeveloped by Forest City Enterprises and The Westfield Group as an expansion of the existing San Francisco Centre with a West Coast flagship location of New York-based Bloomingdale's, which opened on September 28, 2006. The previously much-altered interior has been gutted and rebuilt to meet seismic standards and conform to modern retail configurations. The Emporium's historic domed glass roof was restored and is the centerpiece of the new facility. The developers were fined $2.5 million for demolishing part of the tower and failing to preserve parts of the structure.

The newly expanded downtown mall has a total area of 1.5 million square feet (140,000 m^{2}), had the largest Bloomingdale's location outside of New York City, featured a nine-theater Century Theatres cineplex, and a Bristol Farms specialty foods store.

The mall closed on January 24th, 2026 after struggling from losing tenants like the mentioned Century Theatres and the mentioned Bristol Farms.

=== Capwell's Oakland store ===
The H.C. Capwell flagship store is located at Broadway and 20th Street in downtown Oakland and opened in August 1929. The landmark structure suffered minor structural damage during the 1989 Loma Prieta earthquake and was closed for repairs, but reopened early 1990. It had been a landmark shopping destination for East Bay residents for decades. Emporium closed its doors in February 1996 and, in March, Sears assumed possession. It remained in operation as Sears until its sale and closure in the summer of 2014, when it was scheduled to be renovated and converted to a high-tech retail/office space. Uber bought the building in 2015 and renovated it under the name Uptown Station, with the office space to become the company headquarters, then sold it in December 2017 to CIM Group.

=== Capwell's Fremont store ===
Capwell's originally opened up a storefront across the street from Washington Hospital in 1968, at 2500 Mowry Ave. This was a popular location for "hot-rodders" to hang out at the time, when they weren't racing at Baylands drag strip in South Fremont. This original Capwell's building is still standing, but is now occupied by Washington Hospital West.

In 1987-1989, Capwell's made the move to NewPark Mall, across the 880 freeway from Fremont. It underwent several name simplifications, eventually settling on "Emporium". In 1996, Capwell's went out of business and Target moved into that location in NewPark Mall.

== See also ==
- List of defunct department stores of the United States
- List of department stores converted to Macy's
- City of Paris Dry Goods Co., another San Francisco department store
- Emporium Capwell Company v. Western Addition, 1975 U.S. Supreme Court Case
- San Francisco Centre, former shopping mall connected to The Emporium flagship store
