= The Willows Shopping Center =

Shopping center in Concord, California, U.S.

Coordinates: 37.969012°N 122.057281°W

The Willows Shopping Center is a shopping center in Concord, California.

== History ==
The center was built in 1976 and opened in 1977. It originally comprised about 100 stores in an outdoor setting, include a 200-seat movie theater. Eastman Concord Ventures selected the site in Concord, California, along Interstate 680, after their market research determined the market suitable for a "town and country" styled shopping center.

National retailers at the center include Old Navy, ULTA Beauty, REI, Claim Jumper and Benihana. The center is located adjacent to I-680 that links the area to San Francisco. In addition, two BART stations provide rapid transit.
