= Sherwood Place =

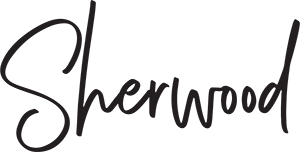
- Location: Stockton, California, United States
- Coordinates: 37.99886°N 121.31312°W
- Address: 5308 Pacific Avenue
- Opened: 1979
- Developer: Stone Brothers
- Owner: Brixton Sherwood, LLC
- Num. of stores: 15+
- Num. of anchor tenants: 6
- Floor area: 525,000 square feet (49,000 m^{2})
- Floors: 1 (2 in Macy's)

Sherwood Place (formerly Sherwood Mall) is a shopping center in Stockton, California, United States. Opened in 1979, it features Macy's, Best Buy, Petco, Ulta Beauty, HomeGoods, Dick's Sporting Goods, Sprouts Farmers Market, Burlington, and Sky Zone. It is owned and managed by Brixton.

Prior to its redevelopment in 2022, it was one of two enclosed shopping malls in Stockton, the other being Mershops Weberstown, which is located next door to Sherwood.

== History ==
Sherwood Place was built in 1979 as Sherwood Mall by Stone Brothers, who sold the property to Brixton Sherwood, LLC in 2017. Its original anchor stores were Macy's and Montgomery Ward, which closed in 2001. It was expanded in 1987 with a new wing featuring a food court, Toys "R" Us and a Gottschalks, which remained until the chain filed for bankruptcy in 2009.

In 2002, Best Buy opened in part of the vacated Montgomery Ward store. The rest later became Petco. A year later, Toys "R" Us closed its store and decided to move its store to a nearby lot, which was located next to Montgomery Ward. The Toys "R" Us space became HomeGoods in 2005 while the rest later became Shoe Pavilion. The interior mall was renovated that same year. Part of the renovations added the aforementioned Shoe Pavilion, which later closed and became Ulta. In September 2014, Dick's Sporting Goods opened in part of the old Gottschalks anchor while the rest later became Sky Zone.

The property underwent redevelopment in 2022 to make way for a new Sprouts Farmers Market and other tenants, according to a press release. Most of the mall interior was shuttered and gutted to make way for Sprouts, as well as Burlington. The mall's exterior tenants remained open during construction, which lasted until spring 2023. As part of these changes, the mall was renamed Sherwood Place.
