= Beverly Connection =

Shopping center in California

Coordinates: 34.0737°N 118.3757°W

The Beverly Connection is a shopping center in Beverly Grove, Los Angeles, across La Cienega Boulevard from the Beverly Center mall. It was originally proposed to be 1,100,000 square feet (100,000 m^{2}) in size but was scaled down to its opening size of 296,000 square feet (27,500 m^{2}) due to concerns about traffic congestion, availability of parking and overdevelopment in the neighborhood.

It opened in January 1989 with anchors including a Ralphs supermarket, Cost Plus Imports, Physico Fitness Superstores, The Wherehouse record store.

Later a cinema multiplex opened as General Cinemas,later AMC Theatres.

The original design had 358,117 square feet of commercial space including retail and restaurants, the 1,875-seat theater complex and approximately 28,868 square feet of office space. The center was renovated in 2006–7; the cinemas were demolished and the center added condominiums and assisted living residences.
