= Florin Towne Centre =

- Location: Sacramento, California, United States
- Coordinates: 38.4960°N 121.4291°W
- Address: Florin Road and Stockton Boulevard
- Opened: 1968 (mall); 2008 (center)
- Closed: February 28, 2006 (mall); still open (center)
- Developer: South Sac, LLC; James J. Cordano Company (Note: Developer of the original mall); Blumenfield Enterprises
- Architect: Johnson Lyman Architects
- Num. of anchor tenants: 5
- Floor area: 484,500 sq ft (45,010 m^{2})
- Floors: 1 (2 in former Sears)

Florin Towne Centre (Note: The spelling of "towne" and "centre" are intentional misspelling/sensational spellings) (formerly Florin Mall and Florin Center) is an outdoor shopping center in the unincorporated area of Florin in Sacramento County, California, United States (with a Sacramento address), in the Sacramento area. It opened in 2008 on the site of the old Florin Mall, which closed and was demolished in 2006. The 484,500 square feet (45,010 m^{2}) center is anchored by AutoZone, Chuze Fitness, PetSmart, US Foods CHEF'STORE, and Walmart.

== History ==
=== Florin Mall ===
Florin Mall (originally named Florin Center) was built by the James J. Cordano Company and Blumenfield Enterprises. The single-level center was situated on 70 acres (280,000 m^{2}), 8 miles (13 km) southeast of downtown Sacramento. It was the Sacramento area's first fully enclosed shopping mall built from the ground up. The site had previously been utilized as the Sky Ranch Airfield.

The mall was opened in February 1968 and was anchored by a 3-level, 157,000 square foot (14,600 m^{2}), Sacramento-based Weinstock's, which held its grand opening October 9, 1967. The mall also included a 2-level, 259,000 square foot (24,100 m^{2}) Sears and a 2-level, 125,000 square foot (11,600 m^{2}) JCPenney. Other major stores surrounding the mall (but not part of the property) were Montgomery Ward (now Burlington), Zody's (later Pak 'n Save) and a White Front discount store (later Price Club). On March 23, 1968 during the 1968 US presidential campaign, Senator Robert F. Kennedy made a campaign stop at the recently opened Florin Mall.

The only physical expansion of the 620,400 square foot (57,640 m^{2}) shopping center was completed in 1978. A 1-level, 46,600 square foot (4,330 m^{2}) addition was built at the main entrance at the front of the mall, increasing its gross leasable area to 667,000 square feet (62,000 m^{2}).

As the second mall-type center on Sacramento's south side, it eclipsed its nearest commercial competitor, Southgate Plaza, which has since converted to a conventional shopping center.

By the 1980s, Florin Mall was becoming rather notorious as a haven for shootings, stabbings and car thefts. Local gangs had made the complex a regular hangout spot by the early 1990s. Customers began wafting to other frequent regional centers, such as Arden Fair, Downtown Plaza and Sunrise Mall. A remodeling of Weinstock's in 1989 and a facelift renovation of the mall proper in the second half of 1990 did little to dispel the negative image that the center had taken on, especially in 1991 when four perpetrators took 41 people hostage at a Good Guys! electronics store that was adjacent to the mall (now a Dollar Tree). It resulted in the deaths of three hostages, injuring 14 others and remains, to this day, the largest hostage rescue operation in U.S. history.

With the acquisition of Weinstock's by Federated Department Stores in August 1995, it was decided that the Florin Mall location be shuttered rather than converting it to Macy's. The store closed in March 1996. This was seen as the first significant decline to Florin Mall. JCPenney was converted to an outlet store in November 1998. The store was shuttered in 2003, leaving Sears as the sole anchor of the mall.

In a state of disrepair for some time, the bulk of Florin Mall was purchased by San Francisco's Jim Kessler and Prudential Insurance Company in October 2005. After 38 years of operation, the mall closed for the final time on February 28, 2006. It was fully demolished in July 2006 (including the former JCPenney and Weinstock's anchors), leaving Sears, its Auto Center, and five outparcels standing.

=== Florin Towne Centre ===
Construction of Florin Towne Centre commenced shortly after Florin Mall was demolished. It included a collection of smaller shops constructed from the east side of Sears (approximately from where the store's old mall entrance was) to the northern edge of Florin Road. On March 6, 2008, Mervyn's became the first store to open in the new shopping center, however the store was short-lived as it was shuttered in February 2009 when the entire chain went out of business. It sat vacant the majority of the time (aside from temporary usage for seasonal retailers such as Halloween City) until 2019 when AutoZone opened in a portion of the former Mervyn's. The other major opening in 2008 was fitness chain 24 Hour Fitness. Walmart opened on June 17, 2009, replacing a former store 1.5 miles (2.4 km) to the west (the old store re-opened six years later as Walmart's Neighborhood Market format in 2015, occupying only half of the old store's original footprint, but later closed in 2019). PetSmart opened on November 12, 2011 in a building adjacent to the former Mervyn's that was originally intended for Old Navy, but never opened. Other retailers include America's Best Contacts & Eyeglasses, GameStop, GNC, Mattress Firm, Shoe Palace, Starbucks, and Verizon. Florin Towne Centre has a total area of 484,500 sq ft (45,010 m^{2}), a much smaller footprint than its predecessor as the bulk of the old mall's footprint now serves as the parking lot for Walmart and other neighboring businesses.

In 2015, Sears Holdings spun off 235 of its properties, including the Sears at the Florin Towne Centre, into Seritage Growth Properties.

On October 15, 2018, it was announced that Sears would be closing as part of a plan to close 142 stores nationwide. The store closed later that year. Sears was the only remnant and remaining anchor from the former Florin Mall that continued to operate until its closure in January 2019.

In the early 2020s, the remaining portion of the former Mervyn's has since been filled by BioLife, a plasma donation center, and local discount retailer Falling Prices.

In 2021, 24 Hour Fitness was shuttered. It was replaced by Chuze Fitness in 2023.
