= 1975 World Team Tennis season =

- Duration: May 2, 1975 – August 16, 1975
- Eastern Division Champions champions: Pittsburgh Triangles
- Western Division Champions champions: San Francisco Golden Gaters

WTT Finals – Bancroft Cup
- Date: August 25, 1975 (Match 3)
- Venue: Pittsburgh, Pennsylvania (Match 3)
- Champions: Pittsburgh Triangles

WTT Seasons seasons
- 1974 1976

The 1975 World Team Tennis season was the second season of the top professional team tennis league in the United States. The Pittsburgh Triangles defeated the San Francisco Golden Gaters in the WTT Finals to win the league championship.

== Competition format ==
The 1975 World Team Tennis season included 10 teams split into two divisions (Eastern and Western). The league intended for each team to play a regular-season schedule of 44 matches. However, WTT scheduled neutral-site matches to cut down on travel and create events where fans could see multiple teams either with one admission or over the course of a few days. These special events were called WTT Spectaculars. Because of these and because of scheduling challenges created when the Houston E-Z Riders suspended operations just days before the season started, the 10 teams in the league did not play an equal number of matches. Seven of them played 44 matches, while three played 46 matches.

The top three teams in each division qualified for the playoffs. The second and third-place teams met in division semifinal matches hosted by the second-place teams. The winners of those matches met the first-place team in the best-of-three division championship series. The division semifinal winners hosted the first match of the division championship series. The first-place team hosted the second and third (if necessary) matches. The division champions met in the best-of-three World Team Tennis Final with the lower seed hosting the first match and the higher seed hosting the second and third (if necessary) matches.

Each match comprised one set each of men's singles, women's singles, men's doubles, women's doubles and mixed doubles. The order of play was women's doubles first, men's doubles third and mixed doubles fifth. The coach of the home team decided whether men's or women's singles would be played second or fourth. Games were decided by the first player or doubles team to reach four points with no-ad scoring. Each set ended when one team had won either six or seven games and had an advantage over its opponent of at least two games. Sets that were tied 6–6 were decided by a tiebreaker. Set tiebreaker games were nine total points with the first player or doubles team to reach five the winner. An advantage of only one point was needed to win a tiebreaker game. Matches could end when one team built an insurmountable lead. For example, if a team had a 24–17 lead after four sets, the fifth set (mixed doubles) would not be played. If a team had a 22–19 lead after four sets, the match could end if the leading team won four games in the fifth set, since it would be impossible for the trailing team to make up the three-game deficit that existed when the set started. If the match was tied at the end of five sets, a super tiebreaker game was played between the mixed doubles teams using the same format as the set tiebreaker games. Teams sometimes agreed to play dead sets even if the outcome of the match had already been decided or to play sets to completion when the outcome of the match was decided within that set.

== Franchise movement, expansion and contraction ==
On October 16, 1974, Toronto-Buffalo Royals president John F. Bassett announced that the team had been sold to Herbert S. Hoffman and Phyllis Morse who said that they would move it to Hartford, Connecticut.

On October 25, 1974, the Chicago Aces ownership announced that the team was up for sale, and there were ongoing negotiations with several groups of investors including one in Atlanta. The team acknowledged some player salaries were late in being paid and said that the statuses of player contracts would be settled after the team was sold.

On November 18, 1974, Seymour Brode and Marshall Greenspan sold the Detroit Loves to a new ownership group led by William H. Bereman and Dan Domont who moved the team to Indianapolis and changed its name to the Indiana Loves.

Burt McGlynn tried to sell the Minnesota Buckskins to local investors after the 1974 season ended. On November 6, 1974, McGlynn announced that the local interest in the Buckskins had dried up, and the team would either fold or be sold and moved. He mentioned that there was interest from investor groups in Indianapolis and Washington, D.C. The investor group from Indianapolis ended up buying the Loves, and the group from Washington decided not to buy the team. On November 26, 1974, WTT announced at its annual meeting that the Buckskins had become the first team in the league to fold.

In late 1974, it was reported that owner Ray Ciccolo had lost about $300,000 operating the Boston Lobsters. In early 1975, he was forced to declare bankruptcy.

At the WTT owners meeting on February 1, 1975, each team was required to post a $500,000 letter of credit. Teams that failed to do so—the Baltimore Banners, the Boston Lobsters, the Chicago Aces, the Florida Flamingos and the Hartford Royals—were contracted. A dispersal draft was conducted to distribute the players from those five teams among the remaining teams in the league.

On February 6, 1975, Bud Fischer, Frank Goldberg and Ben Press sold the defending WTT champion Denver Racquets to a new ownership group that included Reggie Jackson and his agent Gary K. Walker who moved the team to Phoenix, Arizona and changed its name to the Phoenix Racquets.

A group of investors that included Bob Mades, Paul Slater, Herbert S. Hoffman, Robert K. Kraft and Harold Bayne emerged as a potential owner for the franchise in Boston. However, the Lobsters had already been contracted by WTT. The group purchased the Philadelphia Freedoms on March 27, and moved the team to Boston. In order to claim the name of the original Lobsters, the new ownership group would be required to settle some of the debts of the former team. The new owners decided to do this and renamed the Freedoms the Boston Lobsters.

Shortly before the start of the 1975 season, WTT granted an expansion franchise to Frank Mariani to play in San Diego. Mariani named the team the San Diego Friars.

While several of the original 16 WTT franchises from 1974, had financial difficulties resulting in six of them not returning for and four of them moving before the 1975 season, the Houston E-Z Riders had made plans to go forward in Houston. The team was to play its 1975 home matches in the brand new Astroarena. However, just before the season started, on May 2, 1975, team president and vice-president E.Z. and Betty Jones announced that the E-Z Riders were suspending operations for the 1975 season. Players under contract with the team could be loaned to other WTT teams, and the E-Z Riders had the right to protect four players to return for the 1976 season. There were rumors that the E-Z Riders were behind on their financial obligations. However, E.Z. Jones said, "We are 100% current with our league obligations and our player salaries and have even made salary advances." In order to return to WTT in 1976, the E-Z Riders would need to meet certain league financial requirements and exercise an option by September 15, 1975. The suspension of operations was so sudden and unexpected that newspaper advertisements for E-Z Riders home matches continued to run after the announcement. The E-Z Riders did not exercise their option to return to the league in 1976, and the team folded on September 15, 1975.

== Player draft ==
Several high-profile public figures were selected in the 1974 WTT draft. These included comedians Johnny Carson and Bill Cosby, Stan Malless, president of the United States Lawn Tennis Association which objected to WTT, 11-year-old Tracy Austin, Dean Paul Martin, Jr., two-sport star John Lucas and Elton John. Perhaps the most noteworthy selection occurred when Freedoms player-coach Billie Jean King used the team's seventh round pick to select Bobby Riggs whom she had beaten 14 months earlier in the Battle of the Sexes. Stan Smith and Ilie Năstase were chosen by the New York Sets. Ken Rosewall, Manuel Santana, Pancho Gonzales, Andrés Gimeno, Pierre Barthès and Alex Metreveli (Georgian: ალექსანდრე მეტრეველი) were selected by the Hartford Royals. Roy Emerson and Vijay Amritraj (Tamil: விஜய் அம்ரித்ராஜ்) were chosen by the Los Angeles Strings. Olga Morozova (Ольга Васильевна Морозова) was selected by the Houston E-Z Riders. Clark Graebner and Ove Bengtson were chosen by the Cleveland Nets. Joaquín Loyo-Mayo was selected by the San Francisco Golden Gaters. Jeff Borowiak was chosen by the Hawaii Leis. Julie Heldman was selected by the Chicago Aces. Jan Kodeš was chosen by the Baltimore Banners. Chris Evert was selected by the Florida Flamingos. The top overall selection was Colin Dibley who was chosen by the original Boston Lobsters. The San Diego Friars did not make any selections, because the team had not yet been founded.

== Standings and attendance ==
Eastern Division
Pos	Team	MP	W	L	PCT	MB
1	Pittsburgh Triangles	44	36	8	.818	0
2	New York Sets	44	34	10	.773	2
3	Boston Lobsters	46	20	26	.435	17
4	Indiana Loves	44	18	26	.409	18
5	Cleveland Nets	44	16	28	.364	20

1975 Eastern Division Playoffs

Western Division
Pos	Team	MP	W	L	PCT	MB
1	San Francisco Golden Gaters	44	29	15	.659	0
2	Phoenix Racquets	44	22	22	.500	7
3	Los Angeles Strings	44	20	24	.455	9
4	Hawaii Leis	46	14	32	.304	16
5	San Diego Friars	46	14	32	.304	16

1975 Western Division Playoffs

- Hawaii won a standings tiebreaker over San Diego.

Total attendance during the season was 503,858, for an average of 3,053 over 165 playing dates.

== Playoff bracket ==
Division Semifinals (August 17)
Eastern Division
E2	New York Sets	24
E3	Boston Lobsters	25
Western Division
W2	Phoenix Racquets	20
W3	Los Angeles Strings	8

Division Championships (August 18–20)
E1	Pittsburgh Triangles	2
E3	Boston Lobsters	0
W1	San Francisco Golden Gaters	2
W2	Phoenix Racquets	0

WTT Finals (August 21–25)
1	Pittsburgh Triangles	2
3	San Francisco Golden Gaters	1

== Playoff match results ==
- Home teams are in CAPS.

=== Eastern Division semifinal match ===
(2) New York Sets vs. (3) Boston Lobsters
Date	Result
August 17	Boston Lobsters 25, NEW YORK SETS 24

=== Western Division semifinal match ===
(2) Phoenix Racquets vs. (3) Los Angeles Strings
Date	Result
August 17	PHOENIX RACQUETS 20, Los Angeles Strings 8

=== Eastern Division Championship ===
(1) Pittsburgh Triangles vs. (3) Boston Lobsters
Date	Match	Result
August 18	1	Pittsburgh Triangles 25, BOSTON LOBSTERS 16
August 19	2	PITTSBURGH TRIANGLES 23, Boston Lobsters 14
** Series: Pittsburgh Triangles 2, Boston Lobsters 0

=== Western Division Championship ===
(1) San Francisco Golden Gaters vs. (2) Phoenix Racquets
Date	Match	Result
August 18	1	San Francisco Golden Gaters 25, PHOENIX RACQUETS 24
August 19	2	SAN FRANCISCO GOLDEN GATERS 26, Phoenix Racquets 20
** Series: San Francisco Golden Gaters 2, Phoenix Racquets 0

=== WTT Finals ===
(1) Pittsburgh Triangles vs. (3) San Francisco Golden Gaters
Date	Match	Result
August 21	1	SAN FRANCISCO GOLDEN GATERS 26, Pittsburgh Triangles 25
August 24	2	PITTSBURGH TRIANGLES 28, San Francisco Golden Gaters 25
August 25	3	PITTSBURGH TRIANGLES 21, San Francisco Golden Gaters 14
** Series: Pittsburgh Triangles 2, San Francisco Golden Gaters 1

Of the total of 9 playoff matches, home teams won 6 and lost 3. The higher seeds had 5 wins and 1 loss in their 6 home matches. The higher seeds won 4 of the 5 matchups.

== Individual statistical leaders ==
The table below shows the individual players and doubles teams who had the best winning percentages in each of the five events in WTT.

Event	Player(s)	Team
Men's singles	Marty Riessen	Cleveland Nets
Women's singles	Billie Jean King	New York Sets
Men's doubles	Frew McMillan and Tom Okker	San Francisco Golden Gaters
Women's doubles	Billie Jean King and Mona Guerrant	New York Sets
Mixed doubles	Betty Stöve and Frew McMillan	San Francisco Golden Gaters

== Individual honors ==
Award	Recipient	Team
Male Most Valuable Player	Tom Okker	San Francisco Golden Gaters
Female Most Valuable Player	Evonne Goolagong	Pittsburgh Triangles
Male All-Star Match Most Valuable Player	Marty Riessen	Cleveland Nets
Female All-Star Match Most Valuable Player	Greer Stevens	Boston Lobsters
Male Rookie of the Year	Marty Riessen	Cleveland Nets
Female Rookie of the Year	Greer Stevens	Boston Lobsters
Coach of the Year	Frew McMillan	San Francisco Golden Gaters
Playoffs Most Valuable Player	Vitas Gerulaitis	Pittsburgh Triangles

== All-Star Match ==
WTT held its inaugural All-Star Match on July 13, 1975, at the Los Angeles Memorial Sports Arena as part of the evening session of a WTT Spectacular in front of 7,112 fans. The afternoon session drew a crowd of only 1,159. The East defeated the West, 28–21.

== See also ==
- 1975 WTA Tour
- 1975 Men's Grand Prix circuit
