= 1976 World Team Tennis season =

- League: World Team Tennis
- Sport: Team tennis
- Duration: May 1 – August 27, 1976
- Matches: Regular season: 220 (44 for each team) scheduled; 219 played Postseason: minimum of 7, maximum of 11; 8 actually played
- Teams: 10

World Team Tennis Player Draft
- Top draft pick: (South Africa) Linky Boshoff
- Picked by: San Diego Friars

Regular season
- Top seed: New York Sets
- Season MVP: Male: (United States) Sandy Mayer; Female: (United States) Chris Evert

Eastern Division
- Season champions: New York Sets
- Runners-up: Pittsburgh Triangles

Western Division
- Season champions: Phoenix Racquets
- Runners-up: San Francisco Golden Gaters

Division Championship Series
- Eastern Division champions: New York Sets
- Eastern Division runners-up: Pittsburgh Triangles
- Western Division champions: San Francisco Golden Gaters
- Western Division runners-up: Phoenix Racquets

World Team Tennis Finals
- Venue: Nassau Veterans Memorial Coliseum (deciding Match 3); Oakland-Alameda County Coliseum Arena (Matches 1 and 2)
- Champions: New York Sets
- Runners-up: San Francisco Golden Gaters
- Playoff MVPs: Male: (United States) Sandy Mayer; Female: (United States) Billie Jean King

World Team Tennis seasons
- ← 1975 1977 →

The 1976 World Team Tennis season was the third season of the top professional team tennis league in the United States. Led by regular season and playoff male most valuable player Sandy Mayer and female playoff most valuable player Billie Jean King, the New York Sets swept the San Francisco Golden Gaters in the WTT Finals to win the league championship.

== Competition format ==
The 1976 World Team Tennis season included 10 teams split into two divisions (Eastern and Western). Each team was scheduled to play a regular-season schedule of 44 matches.

The top two teams in each division qualified for the playoffs and met each other in the division championship series. The first-place team was given a choice of hosting either the first and third or second and third matches of the series. The division champions met in the best-of-five World Team Tennis Finals with the lower seed hosting the first two matches and the higher seed hosting the remaining matches.

Each match comprised one set each of men's singles, women's singles, men's doubles, women's doubles and mixed doubles. Starting with this season, the order of play for the entire match was determined by the coach of the home team. Games were decided by the first player or doubles team to reach four points with no-ad scoring. Each set ended when one team had won either six or seven games and had an advantage over its opponent of at least two games. Sets that were tied 6–6 were decided by a tiebreaker. Set tiebreaker games were nine total points with the first player or doubles team to reach five the winner. An advantage of only one point was needed to win a tiebreaker game. Starting this season, if the team that won the final set was trailing in the match, the match went to overtime with the same players who participated in the final set remaining on the court. The leading team was required to win a game to end the match. If the match was tied at the end of five sets, or if the trailing team won enough games in overtime to tie the match, a super tiebreaker game was played between the players who participated in the final set using the same format as the set tiebreaker games.

== Player draft ==
WTT conducted its player draft for the 1976 season on December 11, 1975, at the Essex House in New York City. Teams made their selections in reverse order of their regular-season finish from the 1975 season. The players chosen in the first five rounds of the draft are listed in the tables below. The biggest news at the draft was the trade of the rights to Ilie Năstase by the New York Sets immediately after they used their third-round pick on him, to the Hawaii Leis. Năstase expressed interest in playing WTT but not in New York, because New York fans had widely criticized him for his on-court behavior and emotional outbursts. The Sets had previously agreed to allow the Leis to negotiate with Năstase with compensation going from Hawaii to New York if the Leis were to reach a deal with him. The Leis immediately announced that they had signed Năstase to a one-year contract worth in excess of $100,000. Leis owner Don Kelleher would not describe the amount with any more specificity than, "It was six figures." The Leis sent undisclosed cash consideration and future draft picks to the Sets to complete the deal.

First round

No.	Team	Player chosen
1	San Diego Friars	(South Africa) Linky Boshoff
2	Hawaii Leis	(United States) Erik van Dillen
3	Cleveland Nets	(United States) Arthur Ashe
4	Indiana Loves	(Soviet Union) Olga Morozova
5	Boston Lobsters	(United States) Mike Estep
6	Los Angeles Strings	(Australia) Dianne Fromholtz
7	Phoenix Racquets	(Australia) Rod Laver
8	San Francisco Golden Gaters	(Mexico) Raúl Ramírez
9	New York Sets	(United States) Julie Anthony
10	Pittsburgh Triangles	(Argentina) Guillermo Vilas

Second round

No.	Team	Player chosen
1	San Diego Friars	(United States) Nancy Gunter
2	Hawaii Leis	(United States) Billy Martin
3	Cleveland Nets	(Sweden) Björn Borg
4	Indiana Loves	(United States) Beth Norton
5	Boston Lobsters	(United States) Roscoe Tanner
6	Los Angeles Strings	(United States) Dick Stockton
7	Phoenix Racquets	(United States) Stan Smith
8	San Francisco Golden Gaters	(United States) Marcie Louie
9	New York Sets	(Australia) Phil Dent
10	Pittsburgh Triangles	(United States) Dennis Ralston

Third round

No.	Team	Player chosen
1	San Diego Friars	(United States) Janice Metcalf
2	Hawaii Leis	(New Zealand) Onny Parun
3	Cleveland Nets	(United States) Jimmy Connors
4	Indiana Loves	(United States) Barbara Jordan
5	Boston Lobsters	(United States) Pam Teeguarden
6	Los Angeles Strings	(Australia) John Alexander
7	Phoenix Racquets	(Australia) Colin Dibley
8	San Francisco Golden Gaters	(United States) Jeff Borowiak
9	New York Sets	(Romania) Ilie Năstase
10	Pittsburgh Triangles	(Czechoslovakia) Marie Neumanová

Fourth round

No.	Team	Player chosen
1	San Diego Friars	(United States) Charlie Pasarell
2	Hawaii Leis	(United States) Zenda Liess
3	Cleveland Nets	(Poland) Wojciech Fibak
4	Indiana Loves	(United States) Julie Heldman
5	Boston Lobsters	(United States) Janet Newberry
6	Los Angeles Strings	(United Kingdom) Sue Barker
7	Phoenix Racquets	(United States) Jeanne Evert
8	San Francisco Golden Gaters	(Socialist Federal Republic of Yugoslavia) Mima Jaušovec
9	New York Sets	(Soviet Union) Natasha Chmyreva
10	Pittsburgh Triangles	(United States) Lea Antonoplis

Fifth round

No.	Team	Player chosen
1	San Diego Friars	(Japan) Kazuko Sawamatsu
2	Hawaii Leis	(Spain) Manuel Orantes
3	Cleveland Nets	(United States) Valerie Ziegenfuss
4	Indiana Loves	(United States) Lele Forood
5	Boston Lobsters	(United States) Harold Solomon
6	Los Angeles Strings	(Australia) Cynthia Doerner
7	Phoenix Racquets	(United States) Butch Walts
8	San Francisco Golden Gaters	(Argentina) Raquel Giscafré
9	New York Sets	(Paraguay) Víctor Pecci
10	Pittsburgh Triangles	(United States) Brian Gottfried

== Standings ==
Eastern Division
Pos	Team	MP	W	L	PCT	MB
1	New York Sets	43	33	10	.767	0
2	Pittsburgh Triangles	44	24	20	.545	9.5
3	Cleveland Nets	44	20	24	.455	13.5
4	Indiana Loves	44	19	25	.432	14.5
5	Boston Lobsters	43	18	25	.419	15

1976 Eastern Division Playoffs

- New York and Boston each played only 43 matches, because their August 9 match was canceled due to Hurricane Belle.

Western Division
Pos	Team	MP	W	L	PCT	MB
1	Phoenix Racquets	44	30	14	.682	0
2	San Francisco Golden Gaters	44	28	16	.636	2
3	Los Angeles Strings	44	22	22	.500	8
4	San Diego Friars	44	13	31	.295	17
5	Hawaii Leis	44	12	32	.273	18

1976 Western Division Playoffs

== Playoff bracket ==
Division Championships; August 16–19
E1	New York Sets	2
E2	Pittsburgh Triangles	1
W1	Phoenix Racquets	0
W2	San Francisco Golden Gaters	2

WTT Finals; August 21–27
1	New York Sets	3
3	San Francisco Golden Gaters	0

== Playoff match results ==
- Home teams are in CAPS.

=== Eastern Division Championship ===
(1) New York Sets vs. (2) Pittsburgh Triangles
Date	Match	Result
August 17	1	PITTSBURGH TRIANGLES 26, New York Sets 25, super tiebreaker (5–3)
August 18	2	NEW YORK SETS 29, Pittsburgh Triangles 21
August 19	3	NEW YORK SETS 28, Pittsburgh Triangles 26, overtime
** Series: New York Sets 2, Pittsburgh Triangles 1

=== Western Division Championship ===
(1) Phoenix Racquets vs. (2) San Francisco Golden Gaters
Date	Match	Result
August 16	1	San Francisco Golden Gaters 32, PHOENIX RACQUETS 16
August 17	2	SAN FRANCISCO GOLDEN GATERS 24, Phoenix Racquets 18
** Series: San Francisco Golden Gaters 2, Phoenix Racquets 0

=== WTT Finals ===
(1) New York Sets vs. (3) San Francisco Golden Gaters
Date	Match	Result
August 21	1	New York Sets 31, SAN FRANCISCO GOLDEN GATERS 23, overtime
August 23	2	New York Sets 29, SAN FRANCISCO GOLDEN GATERS 21, overtime
August 27	3	NEW YORK SETS 31, San Francisco Golden Gaters 13
** Series: New York Sets 3, San Francisco Golden Gaters 0

Of the total of 8 playoff matches, home teams won 5 and lost 3. The higher seeds had 3 wins and 1 loss in their 4 home matches. The higher seeds won 2 of the 3 matchups.

== Individual statistical leaders ==
The table below shows the individual players and doubles teams who had the best winning percentages in each of the five events in WTT.

Event	Player(s)	Team
Men's singles	Sandy Mayer	New York Sets
Women's singles	Chris Evert	Phoenix Racquets
Men's doubles	Frew McMillan and Tom Okker	San Francisco Golden Gaters
Women's doubles	Françoise Dürr and Betty Stöve	San Francisco Golden Gaters
Mixed doubles	Ann Kiyomura and Ray Ruffels	Indiana Loves

== Individual honors ==
Award	Recipient	Team
Male Most Valuable Player	Sandy Mayer	New York Sets
Female Most Valuable Player	Chris Evert	Phoenix Racquets
Male All-Star Match Most Valuable Player	Tom Okker	San Francisco Golden Gaters
Female All-Star Match Most Valuable Player	Dianne Fromholtz	Los Angeles Strings
Male Rookie of the Year	Rod Laver	San Diego Friars
Female Rookie of the Year	Chris Evert	Phoenix Racquets
Coach of the Year	Fred Stolle	New York Sets
Male Playoffs Most Valuable Player	Sandy Mayer	New York Sets
Female Playoffs Most Valuable Player	Billie Jean King	New York Sets

== All-Star Classic ==
The 1976 WTT All-Star Classic was played on July 10, at Oakland-Alameda County Coliseum Arena in Oakland, California. The West overcame a 21–17 deficit after four sets when Betty Stöve and Dianne Fromholtz beat Martina Navratilova and Virginia Wade in a tiebreaker and then proceeded to win three consecutive overtime games to send the match to a super tiebreaker. A crowd of 12,581 fans watched both teams make substitutions for the super tiebreaker. Chris Evert entered for Fromholtz, while Billie Jean King and Evonne Goolagong replaced Wade and Navratilova. Evert forced Goolagong into an error to seal the West victory.

== See also ==
- 1976 WTA Tour
- 1976 Men's Grand Prix circuit
