= 2020 Philadelphia Freedoms season =

Tennis team season

Division champions

Record
- 2020 record: 12 wins, 2 losses

Team info
- Owner(s): Billie Jean King
- Coach: Craig Kardon
- Stadium: The Greenbrier (capacity: 2,500-seat)

The 2020 Philadelphia Freedoms season was the 20th season of the franchise (in its current incarnation) in World TeamTennis (WTT).

== Season recap ==
As a result of the COVID-19 pandemic, all World Team Tennis matches were moved to The Greenbrier “America's Resort” in White Sulphur Springs, West Virginia. The Freedoms were previously scheduled to play home matches at the Hagan Arena at St. Joseph's University.

== Team personnel ==
=== On-court personnel ===
- (United States) Craig Kardon, Head Coach
- (United States) Caroline Dolehide
- (United States) Taylor Fritz
- (United States) Sofia Kenin
- (France) Fabrice Martin
- (United States) Taylor Townsend
- (United States) Donald Young

=== Front office ===
- Billie Jean King – Owner

== Results ==
=== Regular season ===
Color Key: Win • Loss - Reference:

Team	Match													
Team	1	2	3	4	5	6	7	8	9	10	11	12	13	14
Philadelphia Freedoms (PHL)	OCB	SPR	NYE	WAS	WAS	SPR	CHI	LVR	OCB	ORL	SAN	SAN	CHI	NYE
Philadelphia Freedoms (PHL)	25–16	24–12	17–25	25–17	22–14	23–17	23–19	25–16	22–21	13–23	20–18	24–19	22–21	23–17

=== Playoffs ===
WTT Semifinals; 1 August, The Greenbrier
1	Philadelphia Freedoms	18
4	New York Empire	22
2	Orlando Storm	13
3	Chicago Smash	24

WTT Finals; 2 August, The Greenbrier
4	New York Empire	21
3	Chicago Smash	20

=== Semifinals ===
New York Empire def. Philadelphia Freedoms 22–18
Event	New York Empire	Philadelphia Freedoms	Score	Total score
Men's doubles	Jack Sock / Neal Skupski	Taylor Fritz / Fabrice Martin	5–3	5–3
Women's singles	CoCo Vandeweghe	Sofia Kenin	4–5	9–8
Mixed doubles	Jack Sock / CoCo Vandeweghe	Fabrice Martin (Taylor Fritz sub) / Taylor Townsend	5–1	14–9
Women's doubles	Nicole Melichar / CoCo Vandeweghe	Caroline Dolehide / Taylor Townsend	3–5	17–14
Men's singles	Jack Sock	Taylor Fritz	5–4	22–18
