= 2020 World TeamTennis season =

- League: World TeamTennis
- Sport: Team tennis
- Duration: 12 July – 2 August 2020
- Matches: Regular season: 63 (14 for each team); Postseason: 3
- Teams: 9
- TV partner(s): CBS Sports, CBS Sports Network, ESPN+, Tennis Channel, FITE TV, Facebook

Regular season
- Top seed: Philadelphia Freedoms
- Season MVP: (United States) Taylor Fritz (Male) (United States) Bethanie Mattek-Sands (Female)

World TeamTennis playoffs
- Venue: The Greenbrier, White Sulphur Springs
- Champions: New York Empire
- Runners-up: Chicago Smash
- Finals MVP: CoCo Vandeweghe

World TeamTennis seasons
- ← 2019 2021 →

The 2020 World TeamTennis season was the 45th season of the top professional team tennis league in the United States.

Due to the impact of the COVID-19 pandemic, all matches were held at The Greenbrier “America’s Resort” in White Sulphur Springs, West Virginia.

The New York Empire won their first King Trophy as WTT champions with a 21–20 win in a Supertiebreaker over the Chicago Smash in the WTT Finals.

== Competition format ==
The 2020 World TeamTennis season includes nine teams. Each team plays a 14-match regular-season schedule.
The matches consist of five sets, with one set each of men's and women's singles, men's and women's doubles, and mixed doubles. The first team to reach five games wins each set. A nine-point tiebreaker is played if a set reaches four games all. One point is awarded for each game won and scoring is cumulative. If necessary, Extended Play and a Supertiebreaker are played to determine the winner of the match.
The top four teams in the regular season (12–30 July) will qualify for the World TeamTennis playoffs. The winner of the WTT Finals will be awarded the King Trophy.

== Teams and players ==
The roster players compete for the entire season.

Chicago Smash (Canada) Eugenie Bouchard (United States) Evan King (United States) Bethanie Mattek-Sands (United States) Brandon Nakashima (United States) Rajeev Ram (United States) Sloane Stephens	New York Empire (Belgium) Kim Clijsters (Germany) Sabine Lisicki (Note: On 27 July, the New York Empire traded Vandeweghe and Melichar from the San Diego Aviators for Lisicki and Peschke.) (Czech Republic) Květa Peschke (United Kingdom) Neal Skupski (United States) Jack Sock (United States) Nicole Melichar (United States) CoCo Vandeweghe	Orange County Breakers (United Kingdom) Luke Bambridge (United States) Jennifer Brady (Canada) Gabriela Dabrowski (United States) Steve Johnson (Slovenia) Andreja Klepač (United States) Austin Krajicek

Orlando Storm (United States) Danielle Collins (Note: On 21 July, Collins was suspended from the remainder of the season for violating the COVID-19 protocols.) (Croatia) Darija Jurak (United States) Jessica Pegula (United States) Tennys Sandgren (United Kingdom) Ken Skupski (United Kingdom) James Ward	Philadelphia Freedoms (United States) Caroline Dolehide (United States) Taylor Fritz (United States) Sofia Kenin (France) Fabrice Martin (United States) Taylor Townsend (United States) Donald Young	San Diego Aviators (United States) Ryan Harrison (United States) Christina McHale (United States) Nicole Melichar (United Kingdom) Jonny O'Mara (United States) CoCo Vandeweghe (Germany) Sabine Lisicki (Czech Republic) Květa Peschke

Springfield Lasers (United States) Hayley Carter (Belarus) Olga Govortsova (United States) Mitchell Krueger (Sweden) Robert Lindstedt (United States) Caty McNally (Netherlands) Jean-Julien Rojer	Vegas Rollers (United States) Kristie Ahn (United States) Bob Bryan (United States) Mike Bryan (United States) Asia Muhammad (Puerto Rico) Monica Puig (United States) Sam Querrey (Australia) Ajla Tomljanović	Washington Kastles (El Salvador) Marcelo Arévalo (United States) Nicholas Monroe (United States) Tommy Paul (United States) Bernarda Pera (Australia) Arina Rodionova (United States) Venus Williams

== Standings ==
The top four teams qualified for the 2020 WTT Semifinals.

Pos	Team	MP	W	L	GW	GL
1	Philadelphia Freedoms	14	12	2	308	255
2	Orlando Storm	14	10	4	295	264
3	Chicago Smash	14	9	5	289	266
4	New York Empire	14	7	7	288	277
5	Washington Kastles	14	6	8	265	280
6	Orange County Breakers	14	5	9	270	288
7	Springfield Lasers	14	5	9	261	290
8	Vegas Rollers	14	5	9	257	300
9	San Diego Aviators	14	4	10	268	281

== Results table ==
Color Key: Win • Loss - Reference:

Team	Match													
Team	1	2	3	4	5	6	7	8	9	10	11	12	13	14
Chicago Smash (CHI)	LVR	ORL	OCB	NYE	ORL	SAN	PHL	SPR	WAS	NYE	LVR	OCB	PHL	SAN
Chicago Smash (CHI)	24–18	16–21	23–16	22–21	24–19	20–16	19–23	18–15	21–15	21–16	22–18	16–23	21–22	22–23
New York Empire (NYE)	WAS	PHL	ORL	CHI	SPR	OCB	SPR	SAN	LVR	CHI	WAS	ORL	OCB	PHL
New York Empire (NYE)	20–21	25–17	24–16	21–22	21–15	15–24	17–25	20–19	25–17	16–21	25–15	21–23	21–19	17–23
Orange County Breakers (OCB)	SAN	PHL	CHI	LVR	ORL	SAN	NYE	LVR	WAS	PHL	SPR	CHI	NYE	SPR
Orange County Breakers (OCB)	16–23	16–25	16–23	25–13	23–22	14–20	24–15	19–21	11–25	21–22	24–21	23–16	19–21	19–21
Orlando Storm (ORL)	SPR	LVR	CHI	NYE	SAN	OCB	CHI	WAS	LVR	PHL	SPR	SAN	NYE	WAS
Orlando Storm (ORL)	21–18	15–24	21–16	16–24	22–21	22–23	19–24	23–17	22–16	23–13	24–17	19–15	23–21	25–15
Philadelphia Freedoms (PHL)	OCB	SPR	NYE	WAS	WAS	SPR	CHI	LVR	OCB	ORL	SAN	SAN	CHI	NYE
Philadelphia Freedoms (PHL)	25–16	24–12	17–25	25–17	22–14	23–17	23–19	25–16	22–21	13–23	20–18	24–19	22–21	23–17
San Diego Aviators (SAN)	OCB	LVR	WAS	ORL	LVR	OCB	CHI	NYE	SPR	WAS	PHL	ORL	PHL	CHI
San Diego Aviators (SAN)	23–16	21–23	19–21	21–22	20–15	20–14	16–20	19–20	18–22	16–23	18–20	15–19	19–24	23–22
Springfield Lasers (SPR)	ORL	PHL	WAS	LVR	NYE	PHL	NYE	CHI	SAN	OCB	ORL	LVR	WAS	OCB
Springfield Lasers (SPR)	18–21	12–24	20–18	18–20	15–21	17–23	25–17	15–18	22–18	21–24	17–24	24–19	16–24	21–19
Vegas Rollers (LVR)	CHI	ORL	SAN	OCB	SPR	SAN	WAS	OCB	PHL	ORL	NYE	CHI	SPR	WAS
Vegas Rollers (LVR)	18–24	24–15	23–21	13–25	20–18	15–20	18–24	21–19	16–25	16–22	17–25	18–22	19–24	19–16
Washington Kastles (WAS)	NYE	SAN	SPR	PHL	PHL	LVR	ORL	OCB	CHI	SAN	NYE	SPR	LVR	ORL
Washington Kastles (WAS)	21–20	21–19	18–20	17–25	14–22	24–18	17–23	25–11	15–21	23–16	15–25	24–16	16–19	15–25

== Statistics ==
The tables below show the WTT players and teams with the highest regular-season winning percentages in each of the league's five events.

=== Players ===
Men's singles
Rank	Player	Team	GP	GW	GL	Win %
1	Taylor Fritz	PHL	110	65	45	59.1%
2	Tennys Sandgren	ORL	122	65	57	53.3%
3	Jack Sock	NYE	111	57	54	51.4%
4	Sam Querrey	LVR	115	58	57	50.4%
5	Brandon Nakashima	CHI	116	58	58	50.0%

Women's singles
Rank	Player	Team	GP	GW	GL	Win %
1	Kim Clijsters	NYE	45	30	15	66.7%
2	Jessica Pegula	ORL	69	45	24	65.2%
3	Sofia Kenin	PHL	105	63	42	60.0%
4	Bernarda Pera	WAS	65	36	29	55.4%
5	Jennifer Brady	OCB	103	56	47	54.4%

Men's doubles
Rank	Player	Team	GP	GW	GL	Win %
1	Ken Skupski	ORL	96	54	42	56.3%
2	Taylor Fritz	PHL	70	39	31	55.7%
3	Jack Sock	NYE	111	61	50	55.0%
4	Tennys Sandgren	ORL	110	60	50	54.5%
5	Neal Skupski	NYE	119	64	55	53.8%

Women's doubles
Rank	Player	Team	GP	GW	GL	Win %
1	CoCo Vandeweghe	SAN/NYE	108	66	42	61.1%
2	Nicole Melichar	SAN/NYE	101	61	40	60.4%
3	Eugenie Bouchard	CHI	106	61	45	57.5%
3	Bethanie Mattek-Sands	CHI	106	61	45	57.5%
5	Caroline Dolehide	PHL	90	48	42	53.3%

Mixed doubles
Rank	Player	Team	GP	GW	GL	Win %
1	Kim Clijsters	NYE	56	35	21	62.5%
2	Neal Skupski	NYE	73	42	31	57.5%
3	Bernarda Pera	WAS	62	35	27	56.5%
4	Bethanie Mattek-Sands	CHI	91	51	40	56.0%
5	Fabrice Martin	PHL	108	59	49	54.6%

Overall
Rank	Player	Team	GP	GW	GL	Win %
1	Taylor Fritz	PHL	180	104	76	57.8%
2	Bethanie Mattek-Sands	CHI	197	112	85	56.9%
3	Neal Skupski	NYE	192	106	86	55.2%
4	CoCo Vandeweghe	SAN/NYE	211	116	95	55.0%
5	Jack Sock	NYE	267	145	122	54.3%

Note: Only players who played in at least 40% of their team's total number of games in a particular event are considered. (Overall at least 30% of team's total games)

Most Valuable Players
Male MVP: Taylor Fritz (Philadelphia Freedoms)
Female MVP: Bethanie Mattek-Sands (Chicago Smash)

=== Teams ===
Event	Rank	Team	GP	GW	GL	Win %
Men's singles	1	Philadelphia Freedoms	110	65	45	59.1%
Men's singles	2	Orlando Storm	122	65	57	53.3%
Men's singles	3	Vegas Rollers	115	58	57	50.4%
Women's singles	1	Orlando Storm	105	63	42	60.0%
Women's singles	1	Philadelphia Freedoms	105	63	42	60.0%
Women's singles	3	Orange County Breakers	103	56	47	54.4%
Men's doubles	1	Orlando Storm	110	60	50	54.5%
Men's doubles	2	New York Empire	119	64	55	53.8%
Men's doubles	3	Vegas Rollers	118	61	57	51.7%
Women's doubles	1	San Diego Aviators	109	70	39	64.2%
Women's doubles	2	Chicago Smash	106	61	45	57.5%
Women's doubles	3	Springfield Lasers	107	57	50	53.3%
Mixed doubles	1	New York Empire	118	69	49	58.5%
Mixed doubles	2	Chicago Smash	113	61	52	54.0%
Mixed doubles	3	Philadelphia Freedoms	116	62	54	53.4%

== Playoffs ==
=== Bracket ===
WTT Semifinals; 1 August, The Greenbrier
1	Philadelphia Freedoms	18
4	New York Empire	22
2	Orlando Storm	13
3	Chicago Smash	24

WTT Finals; 2 August, The Greenbrier
4	New York Empire	21
3	Chicago Smash	20

=== Semifinals ===
New York Empire def. Philadelphia Freedoms 22–18
Event	New York Empire	Philadelphia Freedoms	Score	Total score
Men's doubles	Jack Sock / Neal Skupski	Taylor Fritz / Fabrice Martin	5–3	5–3
Women's singles	CoCo Vandeweghe	Sofia Kenin	4–5	9–8
Mixed doubles	Jack Sock / CoCo Vandeweghe	Fabrice Martin (Taylor Fritz sub) / Taylor Townsend	5–1	14–9
Women's doubles	Nicole Melichar / CoCo Vandeweghe	Caroline Dolehide / Taylor Townsend	3–5	17–14
Men's singles	Jack Sock	Taylor Fritz	5–4	22–18

Chicago Smash def. Orlando Storm 24–13
Event	Chicago Smash	Orlando Storm	Score	Total score
Men's doubles	Brandon Nakashima / Rajeev Ram	Tennys Sandgren / Ken Skupski	5–1	5–1
Women's singles	Sloane Stephens	Jessica Pegula	4–5	9–6
Mixed doubles	Bethanie Mattek-Sands / Rajeev Ram	Jessica Pegula / Tennys Sandgren	5–3	14–9
Women's doubles	Eugenie Bouchard / Bethanie Mattek-Sands	Darija Jurak / Jessica Pegula	5–3	19–12
Men's singles	Brandon Nakashima	Tennys Sandgren	5–1	24–13

=== Finals ===
New York Empire def. Chicago Smash 21–20
Event	New York Empire	Chicago Smash	Score	Total score
Men's doubles	Jack Sock / Neal Skupski	Brandon Nakashima / Rajeev Ram	5–2	5–2
Mixed doubles	Jack Sock / CoCo Vandeweghe	Bethanie Mattek-Sands / Rajeev Ram	5–4	10–6
Men's singles	Jack Sock	Brandon Nakashima	0–5	10–11
Women's singles	CoCo Vandeweghe	Sloane Stephens	3–5	13–16
Women's doubles	Nicole Melichar / CoCo Vandeweghe	Eugenie Bouchard / Bethanie Mattek-Sands	5–4	18–20
Extended Play	Nicole Melichar / CoCo Vandeweghe	Eugenie Bouchard / Bethanie Mattek-Sands	2–0	20–20
Supertiebreaker	Nicole Melichar / CoCo Vandeweghe	Bethanie Mattek-Sands / Sloane Stephens	1–0^{(7–6)}	21–20

Finals MVP: CoCo Vandeweghe

== See also ==
- Team tennis
