= 2021 World TeamTennis season =

- League: World TeamTennis
- Sport: Team tennis
- Duration: November 13 – 28, 2021
- Matches: Regular season: 30 (12 for each team); Postseason: 1
- Teams: 5

Regular season
- Top seed: Springfield Lasers

World TeamTennis final
- Venue: Indian Wells Tennis Garden
- Champions: Orange County Breakers
- Runners-up: Springfield Lasers
- Finals MVP: Steve Johnson

World TeamTennis seasons
- ← 2020

The 2021 World TeamTennis season was the 46th season of the top professional team tennis league in the United States.

All matches were held at the Indian Wells Tennis Garden in California.

The season included five teams. Four teams that competed in 2020 (Philadelphia Freedoms, Vegas Rollers, Orlando Storm and Washington Kastles), did not participate during the year due to the revised format and the inability to host home matches, but were expected to return in the 2022 season.

The Orange County Breakers won their third King Trophy as WTT champions with a 21–13 win over the Springfield Lasers in the WTT Finals.

== Competition format ==
Each team played a 12-match regular-season schedule. The matches consisted of five sets, with one set each of men's and women's singles, men's and women's doubles, and mixed doubles. The first team to reach five games won each set. A nine-point tiebreaker was played if a set reaches four games all. One point was awarded for each game won and scoring was cumulative. If necessary, Extended Play and a super tiebreaker were played to determine the winner of the match. The top two teams in the regular season will qualify for the WTT Finals on November 28. The winner of this final will be awarded the King Trophy.

== Teams and players ==
* = Player competed for the full season.

Chicago Smash
(United States) Nicholas Monroe *
(United States) Sloane Stephens *
(Chile) Alexa Guarachi (Nov 17–28)
(United States) Tommy Paul (Nov 21–28)
(United States) Sabrina Santamaria (Nov 13–16)
(United States) Donald Young (Nov 13–20)

| class="col-break " style=" padding-left: 2em;" |

New York Empire
(Belgium) Kim Clijsters *
(United States) Marcos Giron (Nov 20–28)
(United States) Christopher Eubanks *
(Belgium) Kirsten Flipkens *
(United States) Quinn Gleason (Nov 24–28)
(Mexico) Hans Hach Verdugo (Nov 13–19)

| class="col-break " style=" padding-left: 2em;" |

Orange County Breakers
(United States) Amanda Anisimova (Nov 13–20)
(United States) Steve Johnson *
(United States) Austin Krajicek (Nov 17–28)
(United States) Desirae Krawczyk (Nov 22–28)
(United States) Nathaniel Lammons (Nov 13–15)
(Germany) Tatjana Maria *

San Diego Aviators
(United States) Taylor Fritz (Nov 13–18)
(United States) CoCo Vandeweghe *
(United States) William Blumberg *
(United States) Caroline Dolehide *
(Barbados) Darian King (Nov 19–21)
(Australia) Aleksandar Vukic (Nov 22–28)

| class="col-break " style=" padding-left: 2em;" |

Springfield Lasers
(United States) Mackenzie McDonald (Nov 13–20)
(El Salvador) Marcelo Arévalo *
(United States) Denis Kudla (Nov 21–28)
(United States) Catherine McNally (Nov 13–21)
(United States) Asia Muhammad *
(Mexico) Giuliana Olmos (Nov 22–28)

== Standings ==
The top two teams qualified for the 2021 WTT Finals.

Pos	Team	MP	W	L	GW	GL
1	Springfield Lasers	12	8	4	248	214
2	Orange County Breakers	12	8	4	249	216
3	San Diego Aviators	12	5	7	223	242
4	Chicago Smash	12	5	7	222	245
5	New York Empire	12	4	8	213	238

== Results table ==
Color Key: Win • Loss - Reference:

Team	Match											
Team	1	2	3	4	5	6	7	8	9	10	11	12
Chicago Smash (CHI)	SAN	SPR	OCB	NYE	SAN	SPR	OCB	NYE	SAN	SPR	OCB	NYE
Chicago Smash (CHI)	21–22	22–21	17–21	20–16	19–20	15–22	14–25	21–15	14–22	19–18	20–19	20–24
New York Empire (NYE)	OCB	SPR	CHI	SAN	OCB	SPR	CHI	SAN	OCB	SPR	CHI	SAN
New York Empire (NYE)	17–22	18–21	16–20	13–20	16–18	19–16	15–21	20–16	15–24	17–21	24–20	23–19
Orange County Breakers (OCB)	NYE	SAN	CHI	SPR	NYE	SAN	CHI	SPR	NYE	SAN	CHI	SPR
Orange County Breakers (OCB)	22–17	20–21	21–17	17–20	18–16	22–20	25–14	18–25	24–15	20–17	19–20	23–14
San Diego Aviators (SAN)	CHI	OCB	SPR	NYE	CHI	OCB	SPR	NYE	CHI	OCB	SPR	NYE
San Diego Aviators (SAN)	22–21	21–20	15–22	20–13	20–19	20–22	15–25	16–20	22–14	17–20	16–23	19–23
Springfield Lasers (SPR)	CHI	NYE	SAN	OCB	CHI	NYE	SAN	OCB	CHI	NYE	SAN	OCB
Springfield Lasers (SPR)	21–22	21–18	22–15	20–17	22–15	16–19	25–15	25–18	18–19	21–17	23–16	14–23

== Statistical leaders ==
The table below shows the WTT teams and players with the highest regular-season winning percentages in each of the league's five events.

Event	Team	GP	GW	GL	Pct	Player	Team	GP	GW	GL	Pct
Men's singles	Orange County Breakers	97	55	42	57%	Mackenzie McDonald	SPR	47	30	17	64%
Women's singles	Orange County Breakers	92	59	33	64%	Amanda Anisimova	OCB	51	35	16	69%
Men's doubles	Springfield Lasers	90	50	40	56%	Marcelo Arévalo	SPR	83	48	35	58%
Women's doubles	Springfield Lasers	91	55	36	60%	Giuliana Olmos	SPR	40	25	15	63%
Mixed doubles	San Diego Aviators	99	53	46	54%	Caroline Dolehide	SAN	66	37	29	56%
Overall	Springfield Lasers	462	248	214	54%	Marcelo Arévalo	SPR	172	93	79	54%

Note: Only players who played in at least 40% of their team's total number of games in a particular event are considered. (Overall at least 30% of team's total games.)

== WTT Finals ==
Date	Champion	Runner-up	Score	Finals MVP	Ref.
November, 28	Orange County Breakers	Springfield Lasers	21–13	Steve Johnson	

=== Match summary ===
Event	Orange County Breakers	Springfield Lasers	Score	Total score
Men's singles	Steve Johnson	Denis Kudla	5–2	5–2
Women's singles	Tatjana Maria	Asia Muhammad	5–2	10–4
Men's doubles	Steve Johnson / Austin Krajicek	Marcelo Arévalo / Denis Kudla	5–1	15–5
Mixed doubles	Austin Krajicek / Desirae Krawczyk	Marcelo Arévalo / Giuliana Olmos	1–5	16–10
Women's doubles	Desirae Krawczyk / Tatjana Maria	Asia Muhammad / Giuliana Olmos	5–3	21–13

== See also ==
- Team tennis
