= 2018 Philadelphia Freedoms season =

Conference champions

Record
- 2018 record: 12 wins, 3 losses
- Home record: 6-2
- Road record: 6-1

Team info
- Owner(s): Billie Jean King
- General manager: Barbara Perry
- Coach: Craig Kardon
- Stadium: Michael J. Hagan Arena (capacity: 3,500); XS Tennis Village (Chicago); Daskalakis Athletic Center (capacity: 2,509)

The 2018 Philadelphia Freedoms season was the 18th season of the franchise (in its current incarnation) in World TeamTennis (WTT).

== Season recap ==
=== Drafts ===
At the WTT Player Draft on March 13, 2018, the Freedoms selected Amanda Anisimova, Kevin King, and Kevin Anderson.

| Round | No. | Overall | Player chosen | Prot? |
|---|---|---|---|---|
| 1 | 2 | 2 | (United States) Amanda Anisimova | N |
| 2 | 2 | 8 | (United States) Kevin King | N |
| 3 | 2 | 14 | (South Africa) Kevin Anderson | N |

=== Season ===
Led by returning coach and Coach of the Year, Craig Karden, US Open (tennis) champion Sloane Stephens, WTT Male Rookie of the Year, Kevin King, and returning fan favorite and Female MVP Taylor Townsend, the Freedoms put together a successful regular season by going 12-2 and qualifying for a spot in the championship.

While the Freedoms played their home games at Hagan Arena at St. Joe's, the championship game was held at the Daskalakis Athletic Center at Drexel University. The Freedoms took on the Springfield Lasers and lost the first two sets of the match in men's and women's doubles and went down 10-5 at the half. However, the Freedoms managed to re-take the lead 15-14 following two convincing wins in mixed doubles and a dominating women's singles performance by Taylor Townsend. The championship came down to the final set in the form of men's singles where Kevin King took a 3-1 lead over Miomir Kecmanović. However, Kecmanović stormed back and won four straight games including a break of King twice to give the Lasers a 19-18 victory and the championship.

== Team Personnel ==
=== On-court personnel ===
- (United States) Craig Kardon, Head Coach
- (United States) Sloane Stephens
- (United States) Taylor Townsend
- (France) Fabrice Martin
- (South Africa) Kevin Anderson
- (United States) Raquel Atawo
- (United States) Kevin King
- (Canada) Gabriela Dabrowski (substitute)
- (United States) Jackson Withrow (substitute)

=== Front office ===
- Billie Jean King – Owner
- Barbara Perry – General Manager
