= 2019 Philadelphia Freedoms season =

Tennis team season

Division champions

Record
- 2019 record: 11 wins, 3 losses
- Home record: 6-0
- Road record: 5-3

Team info
- Owner(s): Billie Jean King
- General manager: Barbara Perry
- Coach: Craig Kardon
- Stadium: Michael J. Hagan Arena (capacity: 3,500)

The 2019 Philadelphia Freedoms season was the 19th season of the franchise (in its current incarnation) in World TeamTennis (WTT).

== Team Personnel ==
=== On-court personnel ===
- (United States) Craig Kardon, Head Coach
- (United States) Raquel Atawo
- (United States) Danielle Collins
- (United States) Christopher Eubanks
- (United States) Madison Keys
- (United States) Mitchell Krueger
- (Spain) Feliciano López
- (France) Fabrice Martin
- (Spain) Adrián Menéndez
- (France) Adrian Mannarino
- (United States) Tommy Paul
- (United States) Taylor Townsend
- (United States) Donald Young

=== Front office ===
- Billie Jean King – Owner
- Barbara Perry – General Manager
