= 2019 World TeamTennis season =

- League: World TeamTennis
- Sport: Team tennis
- Duration: 14 July – 3 August 2019
- Matches: Regular season: 56 (14 for each team); Postseason: 3
- Teams: 8
- TV partner(s): CBS Sports, CBS Sports Network, ESPN+

Regular season
- Top seed: Philadelphia Freedoms
- Season MVP: (United States) Raquel Atawo (Female) (United Kingdom) Neal Skupski (Male)

World TeamTennis playoffs
- Venue: Orleans Arena, Las Vegas
- Champions: Springfield Lasers
- Runners-up: New York Empire
- Finals MVP: (Sweden) Robert Lindstedt

World TeamTennis seasons
- ← 2018 2020 →

The 2019 World TeamTennis season was the 44th season of the top professional team tennis league in the United States.

The Springfield Lasers defeated the New York Empire in the WTT Finals to defend the King Trophy as WTT champions.

== Competition format ==
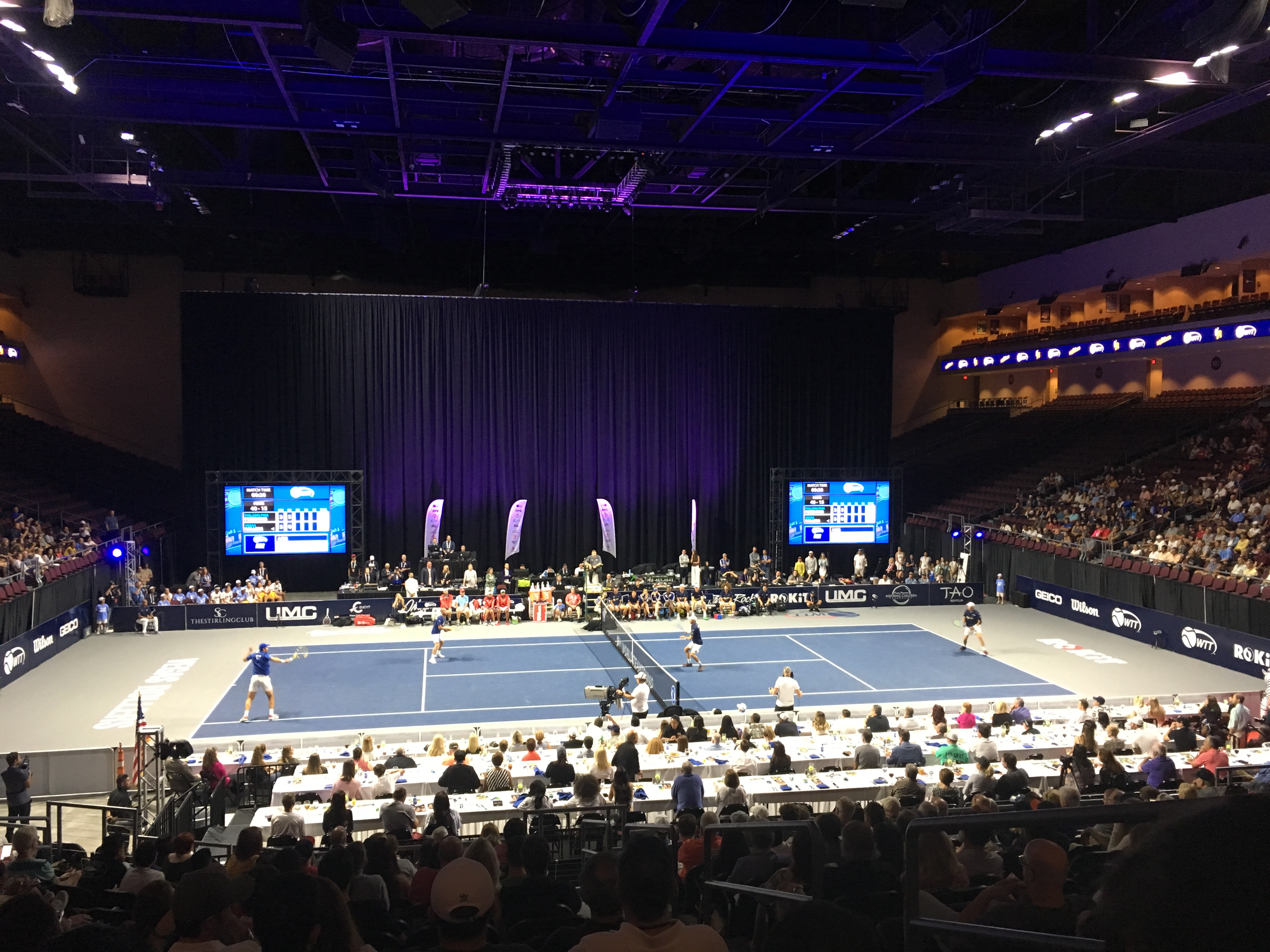
A men's doubles match between the Las Vegas Rollers and Philadelphia Freedoms

The 2019 World TeamTennis season included eight teams. Each team played a 14-match regular-season schedule with seven home and seven away matches. The top four teams in the regular season (14–31 July) qualified for the World TeamTennis playoffs at the Orleans Arena in Las Vegas, with the semifinals on 2 August and the WTT Finals on 3 August. The winner of the WTT Finals was awarded the King Trophy.

== Teams and players ==
New York Empire
Roster	(United States) Ulises Blanch	(Belgium) Kirsten Flipkens	(United Kingdom) Neal Skupski	(Spain) María José Martínez
Franchise	(United States) John Isner	(United States) Sloane Stephens	(United States) Mardy Fish	
Substitute	(United States) Varvara Lepchenko (Note: Lepchenko was traded from the Washington Kastles to New York Empire on 29 July.)			
Orange County Breakers
Roster	(United Kingdom) James Ward (Note: Ward was traded from the Orange County Breakers to the San Diego Aviators on 28 July.)	(United States) Nicole Gibbs	(United Kingdom) Luke Bambridge	(Slovenia) Andreja Klepač
Franchise	(Belarus) Victoria Azarenka	(United States) Steve Johnson	(Canada) Eugenie Bouchard	
Substitute	(Cyprus) Petros Chrysochos	(United States) Noah Rubin		
Orlando Storm
Roster	(United States) Evan King	(United States) Whitney Osuigwe	(United Kingdom) Ken Skupski	(Croatia) Darija Jurak
Franchise	(United States) Madison Keys	(Spain) Feliciano López (Note: López was traded from Orlando Storm to the Philadelphia Freedoms on 20 July.)	(United States) Alison Riske	
Philadelphia Freedoms
Roster	(Spain) Adrián Menéndez	(United States) Taylor Townsend	(France) Fabrice Martin	(United States) Raquel Atawo
Franchise	(United States) Danielle Collins	(United States) Donald Young	(Spain) Feliciano López	
Substitute	(France) Adrian Mannarino	(United States) Tommy Paul	(United States) Mitchell Krueger	(United States) Christopher Eubanks
San Diego Aviators
Roster	(Barbados) Darian King	(United States) Christina McHale	(United Kingdom) Jonny O'Mara	(Germany) Anna-Lena Grönefeld
Franchise	(United States) Taylor Fritz	(United States) CoCo Vandeweghe	(United States) Ryan Harrison	(United States) Amanda Anisimova
Substitute	(United States) Kaitlyn Christian (Note: Christian was traded from the San Diego Aviators to the Washington Kastles on 16 July.)	(United Kingdom) James Ward	(Australia) Arina Rodionova	(United States) Danielle Lao
Springfield Lasers
Roster	(Spain) Enrique López Pérez	(Russia) Anna Blinkova	(Netherlands) Jean-Julien Rojer	(United States) Abigail Spears
Franchise	(Serbia) Miomir Kecmanović			
Substitute	(Belarus) Olga Govortsova	(Sweden) Robert Lindstedt	(United States) Evan Song (Note: Song was traded from the Vegas Rollers to the Springfield Lasers on 2 August.)	
Vegas Rollers
Roster	(United States) Evan Song	(United Kingdom) Harriet Dart	(Australia) Matt Reid	(United States) Asia Muhammad
Franchise	(United States) Bob & Mike Bryan	(United States) Sam Querrey	(United States) Reilly Opelka	(Puerto Rico) Monica Puig
Substitute	(United States) Jennifer Brady (Note: Brady was traded from the Vegas Rollers to the Washington Kastles on 24 July.)	(United States) Sabrina Santamaria	(Serbia) Jovana Jakšić	
Washington Kastles
Roster	(Japan) Yoshihito Nishioka	(Ukraine) Marta Kostyuk	(Brazil) Bruno Soares	(United States) Shelby Rogers
Franchise	(United States) Venus Williams	(Australia) Nick Kyrgios	(United States) Frances Tiafoe	
Substitute	(United States) Kaitlyn Christian	(United States) Nathan Pasha	(United States) Nicholas Monroe	(United States) Varvara Lepchenko
Substitute	(Czech Republic) Květa Peschke	(United States) Jennifer Brady	(United States) Nicole Melichar	(New Zealand) Marcus Daniell
Substitute	(United States) Jared Hiltzik	(United States) Katrina Scott	(United States) Ashley Kratzer	

== Standings ==
The top four teams qualified for the 2019 WTT Semifinals.

Pos	Team	MP	W	L	GW	GL
1	Philadelphia Freedoms	14	11	3	306	242
2	Springfield Lasers	14	9	5	288	268
3	San Diego Aviators	14	9	5	281	254
4	New York Empire	14	8	6	265	276
5	Vegas Rollers	14	6	8	273	266
6	Orange County Breakers	14	6	8	261	268
7	Orlando Storm	14	4	10	260	297
8	Washington Kastles	14	3	11	234	297

== Results table ==
Team	Match													
Team	1	2	3	4	5	6	7	8	9	10	11	12	13	14
New York Empire (NYE)	SAN	LVR	SPR	OCB	WAS	WAS	ORL	LVR	OCB	SAN	ORL	SPR	PHL	PHL
New York Empire (NYE)	11–23	24–16	13–25	15–22	22–13	22–16	23–18	20–24	20–19	15–22	22–18	22–19	15–25	21–16
Orange County Breakers (OCB)	ORL	PHL	NYE	SAN	SPR	PHL	NYE	LVR	SAN	LVR	WAS (Note: Match in Washington was postponed due to rain and played at Orange County ())	ORL	SPR	WAS
Orange County Breakers (OCB)	19–22	15–23	22–15	24–17	18–19	20–19	19–20	19–18	14–22	16–17	25–11	19–18	16–22	15–25
Orlando Storm (ORL)	LVR	OCB	SPR	SAN	PHL	PHL	NYE	WAS	WAS	SPR	NYE	OCB	LVR	SAN
Orlando Storm (ORL)	21–20	22–19	15–23	15–25	19–24	15–23	18–23	19–23	21–18	23–15	18–22	18–19	18–22	18–21
Philadelphia Freedoms (PHL)	SPR	SAN	OCB	LVR	ORL	ORL	LVR	SAN	OCB	WAS	WAS	SPR	NYE	NYE
Philadelphia Freedoms (PHL)	20–22	25–11	23–15	21–16	24–19	23–15	21–18	23–16	19–20	24–17	20–17	22–20	25–15	16–21
San Diego Aviators (SAN)	NYE	PHL	WAS	ORL	LVR	OCB	SPR	PHL	SPR	NYE	OCB	LVR	WAS	ORL
San Diego Aviators (SAN)	23–11	11–25	20–19	25–15	15–23	17–24	24–20	16–23	17–22	22–15	22–14	23–18	25–7	21–18
Springfield Lasers (SPR)	PHL	ORL	NYE	WAS	LVR	SAN	OCB	SAN	ORL	WAS	PHL	NYE	OCB	LVR
Springfield Lasers (SPR)	22–20	23–15	25–13	21–17	19–18	20–24	19–18	22–17	15–23	20–23	20–22	19–22	22–16	21–20
Vegas Rollers (LVR)	ORL	WAS	NYE	PHL	SAN	SPR	PHL	NYE	OCB	OCB	SAN	WAS	ORL	SPR
Vegas Rollers (LVR)	20–21	22–18	16–24	16–21	23–15	18–19	18–21	24–20	18–19	17–16	18–23	21–10	22–18	20–21
Washington Kastles (WAS)	LVR	SAN	SPR	NYE	NYE	ORL	ORL	PHL	PHL	SPR	OCB	LVR	SAN	OCB
Washington Kastles (WAS)	18–22	19–20	17–21	13–22	16–22	23–19	18–21	17–24	17–20	23–20	11–25	10–21	7–25	25–15
Color Key: Win • Loss • Home • Away - Reference:

== Statistical leaders ==
The table below shows the WTT team and the player who had the highest regular-season winning percentages in each of the league's five events. Only players who played in at least 40% of the total number of games played by their team in a particular event are eligible to be listed.

Event	Team					Player					
Event	Team	GP	GW	GL	Pct	Player	Team	GP	GW	GL	Pct
Men's singles	Vegas Rollers	111	64	47	58%	Sam Querrey	LVR	60	31	29	52%
Women's singles	Vegas Rollers	106	58	48	55%	Taylor Townsend	PHL	108	58	50	54%
Men's doubles	San Diego Aviators	104	57	47	55%	Jonny O'Mara	SAN	104	57	47	55%
Women's doubles	Philadelphia Freedoms	93	66	27	71%	Raquel Atawo, Taylor Townsend	PHL	93	66	27	71%
Mixed doubles	New York Empire	104	59	45	57%	María José Martínez	NYE	98	58	40	59%

- Most Valuable Players
  Female MVP: Raquel Atawo
  Male MVP: Neal Skupski

== Playoff bracket ==
WTT Semifinals; 2 August, Orleans Arena, Las Vegas
1	Philadelphia Freedoms	18
4	New York Empire	24
2	Springfield Lasers	21
3	San Diego Aviators	19

WTT Finals; 3 August, Orleans Arena, Las Vegas
4	New York Empire	19
2	Springfield Lasers	20

== WTT Finals ==
Springfield Lasers def. New York Empire 20–19
Event	Springfield Lasers	New York Empire	Score	Total score
Men's singles	Evan Song	Ulises Blanch	3–5	3–5
Women's doubles	Abigail Spears / Olga Govortsova	Kirsten Flipkens / María José Martínez	4–5	7–10
Mixed doubles	Robert Lindstedt / Abigail Spears	Neal Skupski / María José Martínez	5–2	12–12
Women's singles	Olga Govortsova	Kirsten Flipkens	3–5	15–17
Men's doubles	Evan Song / Robert Lindstedt	Neal Skupski / Ulises Blanch	5–2	20–19

- Finals MVP: Robert Lindstedt

== See also ==
- Team tennis
