= San Diego Buds =

- Founded: March 30, 1981
- League: TeamTennis
- Team history: San Diego Friars (1981–1983); San Diego Buds (1984–1985)
- Arena: San Diego Sports Arena
- Owner: Dr. Phil Young
- Championships: 1984, 1985

The San Diego Buds were a TeamTennis team based in San Diego, California, United States. The team played its home matches at the San Diego Sports Arena. The Buds were founded in 1981 as the San Diego Friars, a namesake of the original team that played in World TeamTennis from 1975 through 1978. The Buds were owned by Dr. Phil Young.

World Team Tennis suspended operations after the 1978 season, and all the franchises were terminated. The league restarted in 1981, under the new name TeamTennis with four new expansion franchises, one of which was the new Friars. Each team owner paid a US$75,000 franchise fee to start a new team. The team changed its name before the 1984 season.

== See also ==
- San Diego Friars (1975–1978)
