= Tim Blenkiron =

Australian tennis coach and player

- Country (sports): Australia
- Born: Adelaide, Australia
- Height: 6 ft 6 in (198 cm)
- Plays: Right-handed

Doubles
- Career record: 0–1
- Highest ranking: No. 1206 (26 Apr 1999)

Grand Slam doubles results
- US Open: 1R (1997)

Tim Blenkiron (born 1970s) is an Australian tennis coach and former professional player.

Born in Adelaide, Blenkiron was a tall right-handed player who achieved a world ranking in doubles. In 1997 he featured in the men's doubles main draw of the US Open with University of Nevada, Las Vegas teammate Luke Smith. He and Smith were the 1997 NCAA Division I doubles champions.

Blenkiron operates the No Quit Tennis Academy in Las Vegas. He is a personal coach of Asia Muhammad and has also worked with Eugenie Bouchard. In 2019 he became the inaugural coach of World TeamTennis team the Vegas Rollers.
