= Los Angeles Strings =

Team tennis franchise in TeamTennis

- Founded: March 30, 1981
- Folded: 1993
- League: TeamTennis
- Team history: Los Angeles Strings (1981–1993)
- Arena: The Forum
- Owner: Jerry Buss
- General manager: Jeanie Buss
- Championships: 1981, 1990

The Los Angeles Strings were a team tennis franchise in TeamTennis. They were the namesake of the original Los Angeles Strings (1974–78) and were owned by Jerry Buss, who also owned the original team. The Strings played their home matches at The Forum in Inglewood, California. The Strings won the 1981 TeamTennis championship in their inaugural season, and followed up with a second title in 1990.

World Team Tennis suspended operations after the 1978 season, and all the franchises were terminated. The league restarted in 1981, under the new name TeamTennis, with four new expansion franchises, one of which was the Strings. Each team owner paid a US$75,000 franchise fee. Jerry Buss hired his daughter Jeanie Buss, who was 19 years old at the time, to be the general manager of the Strings.

The LA Strings lost the Buss family a total of $5 million including $200,000 in the first year, and $1 million in the second year.

== See also ==
- Los Angeles Strings (1974–1978)
