= Ben Press =

American tennis player and coach (1924–2016)

- Born: May 21, 1924; San Diego, California, U.S.
- Died: September 9, 2016 (aged 92); Coronado, California, U.S.
- Education: University of California, Los Angeles
- Occupations: Tennis player; writer
- Employer(s): Kona Kai Club; Hotel del Coronado; Hilton Beach and Tennis Club
- Known for: Tennis

Ben Press (May 21, 1924 – September 9, 2016) was an American tennis player, coach, and writer, known for his involvement in World TeamTennis, his connection with the Hotel del Coronado, and as teacher of tennis standouts such as Maureen Connolly and Karen Hantze Susman.

== Early life ==
Press was raised in the University Heights and North Park neighborhoods of San Diego, California. Interested from an early age in tennis, his early tennis teachers included longtime San Diego tennis coach Wilbur Folsom. Press's neighbors in North Park included Ted Williams, with whom Press would play baseball and tennis growing up; and Maureen "Little Mo" Connolly, who would count Press as a lifelong friend, competitor, and coach. Press was considered a top junior player, and won the Bob Carrothers Sportsmanship Award. He played varsity tennis at UCLA.

== Playing career ==
Press's playing career included wins at the La Jolla Championship Summer Tournament in 1949 and 1951. Press played against such contemporaries as Jack Kramer, Bill Tilden, Bobby Riggs, Pancho Gonzales, Whitney Reed, and Tony Trabert. In addition, Press won three USTA Senior National mixed doubles titles with Jeanne Doyle Garrett in 1970, 1973, and 1974, and represented the United States against Canada four times for the Gordon Trophy.

== Teaching career ==
Press was one of the founders of the San Diego Friars in World Team Tennis. He was a nonplaying assistant coach and part owner of the 1974 WTT champion Denver Racquets.

Over the course of more than six decades, Press was head pro at several prominent San Diego-area tennis facilities, including 17 years at the Kona Kai Club and 28 years at the Hotel del Coronado, where he was pro from 1977 until the demolition of the hotel's tennis courts in 2005. Press subsequently became head pro at the Hilton Beach and Tennis Club. He was recognized as a Master Professional by the USPTA.

Press taught Wimbledon champions Maureen Connolly and Karen Hantze Susman, and Australian Open winner Brian Teacher. Press also taught other standout San Diego-area players, such as Marita Redondo, Walter Redondo, Kristien Kemmer, Angélica Gavaldón, Steve Avoyer, Randy Thomas, and Alexandra Stevenson.

== Service, achievements and honors ==
Along with his longtime teaching career, Press wrote at length about tennis. In the 1970s, Press wrote a regular column on tennis for the San Diego Evening Tribune.

Press was a co-founder of the Greater San Diego City Tennis Council, an organization that provides resources and funds for the improvement and refurbishment of public tennis court facilities in San Diego.

Ben served two terms as president of both the San Diego District Tennis Association and the San Diego division of the USPTA.

In 2006, Press was one of ten initial inductees into the San Diego Tennis Hall of Fame. Press was awarded the National Community Service Award from both the USTA and the USPTA.

Press was a 2010 inductee into the USTA Southern California Senior Hall of Fame.

In 2011, Press was given the United States Professional Tennis Association's Presidential Award. Press won the 2012 Lifetime Achievement Award of the USPTA San Diego Division.

Press was the inventor of the Scepter Racquet, which was the first commercial graphite tennis racquet.

Press died of prostate cancer on September 9, 2016, at the age of 92.

== Selected bibliography ==
- 100 Years of Tennis at the Hotel del Coronado. The Greater San Diego Tennis Council/Kales Press. 2010. ASIN: 0979845637.
- The serve ADDvantage. December 2011.
