= Indiana Loves =

Team tennis franchise (1983)

- Sport: Team tennis
- Founded: November 23, 1982
- Folded: July 1983
- League: TeamTennis
- Team history: Indiana Loves; 1983
- Based in: Indianapolis, Indiana
- Stadium: None (played road matches only)
- Colors: British racing green, chartreuse yellow
- Owner: William H. Bereman
- President: William H. Bereman (Team was operated by TeamTennis, not by its owner, during the 1983 season.)
- Head coach: Syd Ball
- Championships: None
- Playoff berths: None

The Indiana Loves were an expansion franchise of TeamTennis that competed only during the 1983 season. The team's owner abandoned it just prior to the start of the season, and it was operated by the league, playing all its matches on the road.

== Team history ==
On November 23, 1982, William H. Bereman, owner of the original Indiana Loves, announced that he had founded an expansion franchise of the same name that would begin play in TeamTennis in 1983. The new franchise expanded the size of the league to 10 teams with eight expected to return from the 1982 season and the previously announced expansion franchise in Atlanta. At the press conference announcing the revival of the Loves, TeamTennis president Larry King said that there would be two more expansion franchises to be located on the East Coast announced within the next 30 days. Reflecting on Bereman's ownership of the original Loves, King said, "Indiana was a good tennis team before, and we expect that under Bill's tutelage, it will be again." The Loves were to play a 14-match regular-season schedule in July 1983. The team planned to play its seven home matches at the 8,000-seat Indianapolis Sports Center near Downtown Indianapolis. TeamTennis required Bereman to sign a US$87,500 letter of credit before the start of the season.

Just days before the scheduled start of the season, TeamTennis announced that the Loves had not signed the required letter of credit and would not play any matches in Indianapolis. Instead, the league would operate the team, and it would only play on the road. This was necessary in order to meet scheduling obligations. The Loves would play a seven-match schedule, visiting each of the other seven teams in the league once. The other seven teams would play seven home matches (one against each of the other teams) and six road matches, visiting each team except the Loves once. The day after the announcement by TeamTennis, Bereman said that he pulled out of the league, because the quality of players did not live up to promises. "When it came to the end, and we had to decide to go or not go, I felt there were just not enough promotable players in the league you could sell tickets for," Bereman said. He added that if he had allowed the Loves' season to take place, it would be "stealing from the fans and the sponsors. We could have gone this year, and we'd have made a profit. But we'd have never sold season tickets in years to come." Bereman said that he had already repaid the US$90,000 of corporate sponsorships he raised, and refund checks would be mailed to the team's 640 season-ticket holders. Bereman said that he had lost about US$15,000 during the brief period he operated the Loves.

In light of Bereman's decision not to field a team, TeamTennis decided before the season that no matter what record the Loves posted, they would be placed last among the eight teams in the standings. The players were paid a salary instead of being eligible for prize money based on their performance. However, their matches counted in the records of the other seven teams. The Loves' first match was a loss to the eventual 1983 champion Chicago Fyre on July 20. Player-coach Syd Ball said, "It's unfortunate we can't play any home matches. But we knew before we hit a ball in Chicago what the situation was. We accepted the fact we won't share in the prize money. We're looking at it as a good workout session that will stand us in good stead in any tournaments coming up. We have a compact little program. We haven't had any wins yet, but we had a super tiebreaker against Dallas. We just like spoiling everybody else's record."

The Loves finished the 1983 season with a record of just 1 win against 6 losses. TeamTennis contracted the franchise following the season.

== Roster ==
The Indiana Loves' roster for the 1983 season was

- (Australia) Syd Ball, player-coach
- (United States) Stacy Margolin
- (Australia) John McCurdy
- (United States) Kim Shaefer
