= No-line court =

Tennis court variant

The multi-colored no-line tennis court is a variant design for a tennis court introduced by World TeamTennis (WTT) during its early years.

The different areas of the no-line tennis court are defined by colors instead of white lines. White lines on a standard tennis court are painted onto a single or two-tone, colored background, as required by the rules of the United States Tennis Association (USTA) and the International Tennis Federation (ITF).

== Development ==
The original multi-colored, no-line tennis court has eleven separate colored areas with no segregating lines. As a functional, no-line tennis court design it was issued a USPTO utility patent #4,045,022 in 1977 to its inventors, Geoffrey Grant, an avid and successful senior tennis competitor, and Robert Nicks, an engineer. These two inventors also developed, tested and patented (USPTO patent. # 3,982,759 the original tennis electronic line judge used by the men's World Championship Tennis and women's tennis tours in 1974–75.

== Variations ==
Distinctively, the no-line, multi-colored tennis court deviates from both the USTA and the ITF rules because the court's playing zones are separated by color instead of lines. Specifically, the court lacks a line dividing the service courts that is two inches wide and twenty-one feet long, and within the rules of tennis, this line is considered to be a part of both service zones. During play, a tennis ball served that hits the shared line is playable from either side service positions. In the absence of the line the size of both service areas deviates from the rules because each court is one inch (2.5 centimeters) narrower than specified by the USTA and the ITF.

The multi-colored court used by the Advanta WTT sponsored league in 2008–09 is a compromise in that it has both white lines and the colored areas that satisfies both the rules of the tennis organizations and media appeal.

== Sources ==
- Greg Hoffman, The Art of World Team Tennis, San Francisco Book Company, 1977 ISBN 0-913374-65-2
- World Team Tennis, Official site
