= Orlando Storm (tennis) =

World TeamTennis professional team

- Sport: Team tennis
- Founded: 2019
- League: World TeamTennis
- Based in: Orlando, Florida
- Stadium: USTA National Campus
- Colors: Storm Red, Orlando Blue
- Head coach: Jay Gooding

The Orlando Storm was a World TeamTennis (WTT) franchise in 2019 and 2020; it was owned by the league. The team was one of two expansion teams to enter the league in 2019 alongside the expansion Vegas Rollers. The Storm played their home matches at the USTA National Campus in Lake Nona, Orlando, Florida.

== Team rosters ==
=== 2020 roster ===
- (Croatia) Darija Jurak
- (United Kingdom) James Ward
- (United Kingdom) Ken Skupski
- (United States) Head Coach, Jay Gooding

=== 2019 roster ===
- (United States) Madison Keys
- (Croatia) Darija Jurak
- (United States) Evan King
- (United States) Whitney Osuigwe
- (United Kingdom) Ken Skupski
- (United States) Head Coach, Scott Lipsky
