= 2018 World TeamTennis season =

- League: World TeamTennis
- Sport: Team tennis
- Duration: 15 July – 5 August 2018
- Matches: Regular season: 42 (14 for each team); Postseason: 1
- Teams: 6

Regular season
- Top seed: Philadelphia Freedoms
- Season MVP: (United States) Taylor Townsend (Female) (Poland) Marcin Matkowski (Male)

World TeamTennis Finals
- Venue: Daskalakis Athletic Center
- Champions: Springfield Lasers
- Runners-up: Philadelphia Freedoms
- Finals MVP: (Serbia) Miomir Kecmanović

World TeamTennis seasons
- ← 2017 2019 →

The 2018 World TeamTennis season was the 43rd season of the top professional team tennis league in the United States.

The Springfield Lasers defeated the Philadelphia Freedoms in the WTT Finals to win their first King Trophy as WTT champions.

== Competition format ==
The 2018 World TeamTennis season featured six teams. Each team played a 14-match regular-season schedule, with seven home and seven away matches. The top two teams from the regular season qualified for the World TeamTennis Finals. The higher-seeded team was designated as the "home" team for the finals and had the right to determine the order of play. The winner of the WTT Finals was awarded the King Trophy.

== Teams and players ==
Roster players compete (nearly) the entire season, Franchise and Wildcard players only a limited season. Substitute players are not listed.

| New York Empire | Orange County Breakers | Philadelphia Freedoms | San Diego Aviators | Springfield Lasers | Washington Kastles |
|---|---|---|---|---|---|
Roster players
| (United States) Dennis Novikov | (Barbados) Darian King | (United States) Kevin King | (United Kingdom) Marcus Willis | (Serbia) Miomir Kecmanović | (United States) Tennys Sandgren |
| (Germany) Tatjana Maria | (Belgium) Yanina Wickmayer | (United States) Taylor Townsend | (United Kingdom) Naomi Broady | (United States) Vania King | (United States) Madison Brengle |
| (United Kingdom) Neal Skupski | (Brazil) Marcelo Demoliner | (France) Fabrice Martin | (Poland) Marcin Matkowski | (Canada) Daniel Nestor | (Sweden) Robert Lindstedt |
| (Spain) María José Martínez | (Slovenia) Andreja Klepač | (United States) Raquel Atawo | (Germany) Anna-Lena Grönefeld | (United States) Abigail Spears | (United States) Nicole Melichar |
Franchise and Wildcard players
| (United States) Mardy Fish | (United States) Sam Querrey | (United States) Sloane Stephens | (United States) CoCo Vandeweghe | (United States) Jack Sock | (United States) Venus Williams |
| (United States) Steve Johnson | | (Canada) Gabriela Dabrowski | (United States) Taylor Fritz | | (United States) Bob & Mike Bryan |
| | | | | | (United States) Frances Tiafoe |
| | | | | | (Japan) Naomi Osaka |
Coaches
| (United States) Gigi Fernández | (United States) Rick Leach | (United States) Craig Kardon | (United Kingdom) John Lloyd | (South Africa) John-Laffnie de Jager | (United States) Murphy Jensen |

- On 2 August 2018, the Springfield Lasers traded Marcelo Demoliner from the Orange County Breakers for Daniel Nestor.

== Standings ==
The top two teams qualified for the 2018 WTT Finals.

| Pos | Team | MP | W | L | Pct | MB |
|---|---|---|---|---|---|---|
| 1 | Philadelphia Freedoms | 14 | 12 | 2 | .857 | 0 |
| 2 | Springfield Lasers | 14 | 8 | 6 | .571 | 4 |
| 3 | Washington Kastles | 14 | 7 | 7 | .500 | 5 |
| 4 | San Diego Aviators | 14 | 7 | 7 | .500 | 5 |
| 5 | Orange County Breakers | 14 | 6 | 8 | .429 | 6 |
| 6 | New York Empire | 14 | 2 | 12 | .143 | 10 |

== Results table ==
| Team | Match | | | | | | | | | | | | | |
| Team | 1 | 2 | 3 | 4 | 5 | 6 | 7 | 8 | 9 | 10 | 11 | 12 | 13 | 14 |
|---|---|---|---|---|---|---|---|---|---|---|---|---|---|---|
| New York Empire (NYE) | WAS | WAS | PHL | SPR | SAN | WAS | WAS | SPR | OCB | SPR | OCB | SAN | PHL | PHL |
| New York Empire (NYE) | 18–22 | 20–21 | 17–21 | 22–23 | 18–23 | 18–20 | 14–24 | 17–25 | 14–22 | 20–21 | 16–22 | 21–17 | 13–23 | 19–15 |
| Orange County Breakers (OCB) | PHL | SPR | WAS | PHL | SPR | SAN | SAN | PHL | NYE | SAN | NYE | SAN | SPR | WAS |
| Orange County Breakers (OCB) | 16–23 | 22–16 | 18–22 | 20–16 | 20–19 | 17–19 | 20–21 | 14–26 | 22–14 | 18–23 | 22–16 | 19–24 | 17–20 | 23–17 |
| Philadelphia Freedoms (PHL) | OCB | SAN | NYE | OCB | WAS | SPR | SPR | OCB | SAN | WAS | WAS | SPR | NYE | NYE |
| Philadelphia Freedoms (PHL) | 23–16 | 22–17 | 21–17 | 16–21 | 21–14 | 24–19 | 23–12 | 26–14 | 25–12 | 23–18 | 23–19 | 20–18 | 23–13 | 15–19 |
| San Diego Aviators (SAN) | SPR | PHL | SPR | WAS | NYE | OCB | OCB | WAS | PHL | OCB | NYE | OCB | WAS | SPR |
| San Diego Aviators (SAN) | 21–12 | 17–22 | 20–22 | 25–13 | 23–18 | 19–17 | 21–20 | 20–21 | 12–25 | 23–18 | 17–21 | 24–19 | 18–19 | 18–25 |
| Springfield Lasers (SPR) | SAN | OCB | SAN | NYE | OCB | PHL | PHL | NYE | WAS | NYE | WAS | PHL | OCB | SAN |
| Springfield Lasers (SPR) | 12–21 | 16–22 | 22–20 | 23–22 | 19–20 | 19–24 | 12–23 | 25–17 | 22–15 | 21–20 | 22–21 | 18–20 | 20–17 | 25–18 |
| Washington Kastles (WAS) | NYE | NYE | OCB | SAN | PHL | NYE | NYE | SAN | SPR | PHL | PHL | SPR | SAN | OCB |
| Washington Kastles (WAS) | 22–18 | 21–20 | 22–18 | 13–25 | 14–21 | 20–18 | 24–14 | 21–20 | 15–22 | 18–23 | 19–23 | 21–22 | 19–18 | 17–23 |
Color Key: Win • Loss • Home • Away Reference:

== Statistical leaders ==
The table below shows the WTT team and the player who had the highest regular-season winning percentages in each of the league's five events. Only players who played in at least 40% of the total number of games played by their team in a particular event are eligible to be listed.

| Event | Team | | | | | Player | | | | | |
| Event | Team | GP | GW | GL | Pct | Player | Team | GP | GW | GL | Pct |
|---|---|---|---|---|---|---|---|---|---|---|---|
| Men's singles | Springfield Lasers | 102 | 57 | 45 | .559 | Miomir Kecmanović | SPR | 96 | 52 | 44 | .542 |
| Women's singles | Philadelphia Freedoms | 99 | 69 | 30 | .697 | Taylor Townsend | PHL | 82 | 60 | 22 | .732 |
| Men's doubles | Orange County Breakers | 110 | 62 | 48 | .564 | Marcelo Demoliner | OCB | 101 | 57 | 44 | .564 |
| Women's doubles | Philadelphia Freedoms | 107 | 63 | 44 | .589 | Taylor Townsend | PHL | 92 | 53 | 39 | .576 |
| Mixed doubles | San Diego Aviators | 114 | 61 | 53 | .535 | Marcin Matkowski, Anna-Lena Grönefeld | SAN | 114 | 61 | 53 | .535 |

- Most Valuable Players
  Female MVP: Taylor Townsend
  Male MVP: Marcin Matkowski

== WTT Finals ==
| Date | Champion | Runner-up | Score | Venue | Finals MVP | Ref. |
|---|---|---|---|---|---|---|
| 5 August 2018 | Springfield Lasers | Philadelphia Freedoms | 19–18 | Daskalakis Athletic Center, Philadelphia | Miomir Kecmanović | |

Match summary

| Event | Springfield Lasers | Philadelphia Freedoms | Score | Total score |
|---|---|---|---|---|
| Men's doubles | Miomir Kecmanović / Marcelo Demoliner | Kevin King / Fabrice Martin | 5–3 | 5–3 |
| Women's doubles | Abigail Spears / Vania King | Taylor Townsend / Raquel Atawo | 5–2 | 10–5 |
| Mixed doubles | Marcelo Demoliner / Abigail Spears | Fabrice Martin / Taylor Townsend | 2–5 | 12–10 |
| Women's singles | Vania King | Taylor Townsend | 2–5 | 14–15 |
| Men's singles | Miomir Kecmanović | Kevin King | 5–3 | 19–18 |

== See also ==
- Team tennis
