= Idaho Sneakers =

- Founded: 1994
- League: World TeamTennis
- Team history: Idaho Sneakers; 1994-2000?
- Based in: Boise, Idaho
- Stadium: Bank of America Centre in Idaho
- Colors: Green and Yellow
- Head coach: Greg Patton
- Mascot: Sneaky Pete

The Idaho Sneakers were a professional tennis team in the city of Boise. They entered the World TeamTennis League in 1994, and the franchise moved to St. Louis, Missouri as the St. Louis Aces after the 2000 season. The Sneakers played their home matches at the Bank of America Centre in Boise.

== Results ==
1994 - 2nd Place

== Players ==
- (United States) Greg Patton, Head Coach (1995–1997); Coach of the Year 1993, 1995
- (United States) Michael Robertson (1998)
- (United States) Wayne Bryan (1999)
- (United States) Jim Moortgat, Head Coach (2000)

=== Headliners ===
- (Russia) Anna Kournikova
- (United States) Bob Bryan (1999)
- (United States) Mike Bryan (1999)
- (United States) Andy Roddick (2000)

=== Other players ===
- (United States) Katrina Adams (1998)
- (Netherlands) Manon Bollegraf (1994)
- (United States) Jane Chi (1995, 1996, 1999, 2000)
- (United States) Gigi Fernandez (1998)
- (United States) Amy Frazier (1994-1997)
- (United States) Debbie Graham (1998)
- (South Africa) Kim Grant (2000)
- (United States) Jonathan Leach (1994-1996)
- (United States) Rick Leach (1994-1996)
- (Croatia) Mirjana Lucic (1999)
- (United States) Katie Schlukebir (1998-2000)

== See also ==
- World TeamTennis
