= Seattle Cascades =

1970s American tennis team

- Sport: Team tennis
- Founded: May 22, 1973
- Folded: November 10, 1978
- League: World TeamTennis
- Division: Western
- Team history: San Diego Swingers; Never played Hawaii Leis; 1974–1976; Sea-Port Cascades; 1977; Seattle Cascades; 1978
- Based in: Seattle, Washington
- Stadium: Seattle Center Coliseum; Mercer Arena
- Colors: Midnight Blue, Cadet Gray
- Owner: Don Kelleher; Rudy Tulipani; Howard Leendertsen et al
- President: Don Kelleher
- Head coach: Tom Gorman
- Championships: None
- Division titles: None
- Playoff berths: 1977 (as Sea-Port Cascades); 1978 (as Seattle Cascades)

The Seattle Cascades were a charter franchise of World Team Tennis (WTT). The team first played as the Hawaii Leis in the league's inaugural 1974 season, before becoming the Sea-Port Cascades for the 1977 season, when it played half its home matches in Seattle, Washington and the other half in Portland, Oregon. The team left Portland in 1978, and played nearly all its home matches in Seattle. The Cascades announced the team would fold following the 1978 season.

== Team history ==
=== Founding and inaugural season ===
The Cascades were founded as WTT's charter franchise for San Diego, California in 1973, by orthodontist Dr. Leonard Bloom. The team adopted the name San Diego Swingers.

The top 10 draft choices of the Swingers in the WTT inaugural draft were

Round	No.	Overall	Player chosen
1	3	3	Rod Laver
2	14	30	Karen Hantze Susman
3	3	35	Wendy Overton
4	14	62	Ilie Năstase
5	3	67	Jan Kodeš
6	14	94	Alex Metreveli
7	3	99	Maria Bueno
8	14	126	Roy Barth
9	3	131	Ann Haydon-Jones
10	14	158	Glynis Coles

None of these players were on the Leis' opening day roster.

Hawaii Leis logo used from 1974 to 1976.

Before ever playing in San Diego, Bloom sold the team on February 15, 1974, to San Rafael, California lumber sales executive Don Kelleher who relocated the team to Honolulu, Hawaii. Rudy Tulipani was Kelleher's minority partner. After a contest was held to name the team, and more than 600 entries were submitted, the Swingers were renamed the Hawaii Leis. The Leis played nine of their 22 home matches at the Honolulu International Center and the other 13 at the Student Council Gymnasium on the campus of President William McKinley High School during the league's inaugural in 1974 season.

After moving to Hawaii, the team was active in the trade market. The Leis acquired Dennis Ralston and Ann Kiyomura in trades with the San Francisco Golden Gaters and Valerie Ziegenfuss and Ross Case in a trade with the Los Angeles Strings. Other players opening the season with the Leis were Brigitte Cuypers, Mike Machette and Kristy Pigeon. Ralston was the team's player-coach.

On May 7, 1974, the Leis played their inaugural match at the Nassau Veterans Memorial Coliseum in the hamlet of Uniondale in the town of Hempstead, New York against the New York Sets in front of 4,999 fans. Under rules used only during the first few weeks of the season, the match comprised two sets of women's singles, two sets of men's singles and two sets of mixed doubles. No men's or women's doubles were played. WTT changed the match format on May 18, 1974, to one set each of men's singles, women's singles, men's doubles, women's doubles and mixed doubles. Ziegenfuss topped Pam Teeguarden in the opening set of women's singles for the Leis, 6–4. Case took the second set in men's singles against Manuel Santana, 6–4. The Leis went on to win four of the six sets and take the match, 29–25.

The Leis' first home match was a 26–19 loss to the Golden Gaters in front of 2,689 fans at the Honolulu International Center on May 20, 1974.

The Leis signed Hawaiian player Charlie Panui midway through the season. Panui teamed with Kiyomura in mixed doubles on July 30, to take a set from David Lloyd and Ann Haydon Jones of the Minnesota Buckskins in a tiebreaker. The Leis lost the match in front of a home crowd of just 545 fans.

The Leis signed Barry McKay during the season.

The Leis finished the 1974 season with 14 wins and 30 losses, last place in the Pacific Section.

=== Buchholz becomes new coach ===
With six teams either folding or being contracted, one suspending operations and one new expansion team joining the league, there were many players who participated in WTT in 1974 who were available for 1975. The Leis brought back Brigitte Cuypers from the prior year's squad. They added Owen Davidson (Minnesota Buckskins), Butch Buchholz (Chicago Aces) and Chris Evert (Florida Flamingos) in the dispersal draft. John Newcombe was on loan from the Houston E-Z Riders who had suspended operations (and would later fold). The Leis selected Helen Gourlay in the dispersal draft when the E-Z Riders suspended operations. They also added Kathy Kuykendall and Tom Edlefsen. Evert, who had not expressed interest in playing WTT in 1975, was traded to the San Francisco Golden Gaters for Margaret Court who sat out 1974, while she was pregnant but signed with the Leis for 1975. Buchholz became the player-coach. The Leis also added four local Hawaiian players: Heather Dahlgren, Stanley Pasarell, Peter Burwash and Jim Osborne.

The Leis played a 46-match WTT regular season schedule in 1975. The league used neutral-site matches to cut down on travel and create events where fans could see multiple teams either with one admission or over the course of a few days. These special events were called WTT Spectaculars. Because of these and because of scheduling challenges created when the E-Z Riders suspended operations just days before the season started, the 10 teams in the league did not play an equal number of matches. Seven of them played 44 matches, while the Leis, Boston Lobsters and San Diego Friars each played 46 matches. The Leis played home matches at both the Hawaii International Center and the Royal Lahaina Tennis Ranch in Lāhainā, Maui County, Hawaii.

With the remade roster filled with big-name stars, the Leis were doing much better at the gate. The team's average home attendance was up 72% over the prior year, the second largest percentage increase in WTT, as of the mid-season Wimbledon break.

Newcombe and Davidson were not committed to the Leis full-time. In addition, Newcombe suffered torn cartilage in his knee in June, which caused him to miss matches. The Leis struggled to a record of 14 wins and 32 losses, barely avoiding last place in the Western Division and the worst record in WTT by winning a standings tiebreaker over the Friars who had the same record.

=== Năstase joins the Leis ===
Although the Leis (then the Swingers) had drafted Ilie Năstase with their fourth pick in the WTT inaugural draft, they had left him unprotected in the 1974 draft, and he was selected by the New York Sets. In late 1975, Năstase expressed interest in playing WTT but not in New York, because New York fans had widely criticized him for his on-court behavior and emotional outbursts. The Sets agreed to allow the Leis to negotiate with Năstase with compensation going from Hawaii to New York if the Leis were to sign him to a contract. The Leis signed Năstase to a one-year contract worth in excess of $100,000. Leis owner Don Kelleher would not describe the amount with any more specificity than, "It was six figures." The Leis sent undisclosed cash consideration and draft picks to the Sets to complete the deal. The announcement of the trade for and signing of Năstase was made at the WTT's 1975 draft at which the most noteworthy player chosen by the Leis was two-sport star John Lucas.

On April 23, 1976, the Leis reached a deal with the Pittsburgh Triangles whereby the Triangles would loan Sue Stap to the Leis for one year for an undisclosed amount of cash consideration. Under the deal, the rights to Stap revert to the Triangles after the 1976 season.

In addition to Năstase and Stap, the Leis also acquired Marcie Louie from the Golden Gaters. Player-coach Butch Buchholz, Owen Davidson and Helen Gourlay all returned from the previous season's team. The rights to John Newcombe were traded to the Los Angeles Strings. Margaret Court retired to have her third child.

On June 2, the Leis acquired Nancy Gunter in a trade with the Triangles for Sue Stap which completed both teams' obligations under the player loan agreement for Stap.

On June 6, Leis president Don Kelleher announced plans to sue Năstase for breach of contract seeking $4 million in damages. Năstase had left the Leis, because his visa had expired and then informed the team that he was not coming back.

The Leis planned to play all their home matches in the Neal S. Blaisdell Arena, the largest venue within the Honolulu International Center complex in 1976, leaving behind the smaller venues they had used in their first two seasons in Hawaii. Attendance at Leis' home matches was disappointing. While it hadn't slipped significantly from 1975, it was averaging about 2,500 fans per match for the first seven home dates of 1976. On July 2, Leis' president Kelleher announced that six home matches in late July would be moved: three to the Veterans Memorial Coliseum in Portland, Oregon and three to the Seattle Center Coliseum in Seattle, Washington. Kelleher said that he was looking into the possibility of moving the Leis to one of those two cities or having a joint franchise that would play in both cities. When announcing the movement of the six home matches to the Pacific Northwest, Kelleher said, "We feel we'll move." He then backed down slightly and said, "Let's say we're thinking of it. If we do move, Seattle is a strong possibility."

The Leis finished the 1976 season with 12 wins and 32 losses, last place in the Western Division and the worst record in WTT.

=== Move to Pacific Northwest ===
Sea-Port Cascades logo used in 1977.

On September 23, 1976, team president Don Kelleher announced that the Leis would leave Hawaii for the 1977 season and play half their home matches in Seattle, Washington and the other half in Portland, Oregon. The team was renamed the Sea-Port Cascades.

Kelleher wanted to repair the rift with Ilie Năstase. However, Năstase did not want to live in the Pacific Northwest. The Cascades traded his rights to the Los Angeles Strings who gave him a six-year contract worth $1.5 million and two silver Corvettes. The Cascades selected Evonne Goolagong Cawley in the dispersal draft held after the Pittsburgh Triangles folded. Kelleher was in serious negotiations with her when she became pregnant and decided not to play. The Cascades did have success signing Betty Stöve whom the team had selected in the draft, after she was left unprotected by the San Francisco Golden Gaters.

In February 1977, former Leis player Marcie Louie filed a lawsuit against the Cascades claiming breach of contract, libel, slander and invasion of privacy. She was seeking $1.5 million in damages.

Kelleher hired Marty Loughman as the team's general manager. Loughman signed JoAnne Russell, Erik van Dillen, Patricia Bostrom and Steve Docherty as free agents. Bostrom had been a star collegiate player with the Washington Huskies. On March 6, 1977, the Cascades landed another local player when they signed Tom Gorman who was ranked 12th in the world at the time and had played collegiate tennis for the Seattle Chieftains.

The Cascades played 11 of their 22 home matches at the Veterans Memorial Coliseum in Portland and the other 11 in Seattle. Some of the home matches in Seattle were played at the Seattle Center Coliseum. Most of them were played at the smaller Mercer Arena.

The Cascades were streaky in 1977. They started their season with 6 wins in their first 8 matches. Then, they lost 9 of their final 11 matches closing the first half of the season. Several players had bright moments during the season. Stöve had a brilliant Wimbledon during the break in the WTT schedule, reaching the final in women's singles, women's doubles and mixed doubles, but losing all three. She did return after the break to win the WTT Female All-Star Match Most Valuable Player Award. Russell teamed with former Leis player Helen Gourlay to beat Stöve and Martina Navratilova in the Wimbledon women's doubles final. In league play, Gorman recorded two set wins over Björn Borg who was at the peak of his Hall of Fame career.

The Cascades players maintained residences in Seattle during the 1977 season. After home matches in Portland, the players were expected to catch the first commercial flight back to Seattle, because team president Kelleher refused to pay for hotel rooms for them.

At the start of the Wimbledon break, Kelleher fired the Cascades public relations director George Hill. In announcing the firing, Kelleher said, "We looked around at all the empty seats and felt we needed to be more sales oriented." However, the team had lost 9 of its previous 11 matches, and Kelleher refused to allocate any money in the team's budget to pay for advertising. Upset with the firing of Hill, salesperson Dianne Shorett and secretary/bookkeeper Molly Cheshier both quit. Shortett later sued the Cascades claiming $3,360.03 in unpaid salary and commissions.

The Cascades finished the 1977 season with 18 wins and 26 losses, fourth place in the Western Division and secured the first playoff berth in franchise history.

The Cascades went on the road for the first match of the best-of-three Western Division Semifinals and lost, 30–14, to a seasoned Phoenix Racquets team on August 16. Two days later, the Cascades hosted the second match at Pamplin Sports Center in Portland. Kelleher was convinced that no advertising was needed for a playoff match in which the opposing team featured Chris Evert. When general manager Loughman saw the advance ticket sales were very low, he drove through the streets of downtown Portland on the day of the match with a loudspeaker on top of his car advertising the playoff match and the presence of Evert and the Racquets. It didn't help. Fewer than 700 people showed up to see the Cascades fall in a tight match, 27–26, ending the season for Sea-Port. After the match, Evert said, "I haven't played before a crowd like this, in a high school gym like this, since I was playing juniors."

Loughman resigned as general manager on September 7, saying, "It's Don Kelleher's team and his money, and he's entitled to run the club and spend his money any way he wants. But for me to be involved it had to be more professional."

=== Final season ===
On September 11, 1977, Kelleher announced that the Cascades were leaving Portland and planned to play all their 1978 home matches in Seattle and would be renamed the Seattle Cascades.

In late 1977, the Cascades announced that John DeVries had been named the team's executive director. Just three months after taking the job, DeVries was fired after a dozen sales people had resigned. DeVries said, "Joining the franchise was one of the worst mistakes of my life. They are still not a first-class operation. What they need are new owners. They are still looking for the Seattle business community to support them. They are Jesse James trying to get into everybody's pocket."

Kelleher attracted a group of four local Seattle investors to buy shares of the team. The group was led by radio industry executive Howard Leendersten. At the insistence of the new investor group, the Cascades hired Pat Dawson as operations director. Dawson had experience as a publicist and many connections in the community.

The Cascades signed Sherwood Stewart, Marita Redondo, and Chris Kachel during the off-season. They also reacquired Brigitte Cuypers who had played for the team in 1974 and 1975. Player-coach Tom Gorman and Betty Stöve returned from the previous season's team.

The Cascades played 1978 home matches at both Seattle Center Coliseum and Mercer Arena. Of the team's 22 home matches, 19 were played in Seattle. Portland, Corvallis, Oregon and Boise, Idaho each hosted one Cascades home match.

The Cascades were involved in a noteworthy incident during a home match against the New York Apples. The Cascades had a 21–17 lead after four sets with mixed doubles remaining. Billie Jean King and Ray Ruffels beat Stöve and Stewart, 6–2, to tie the match at 23 and send it to a super tiebreaker. After Stöve and Stewart took a 5–1 lead in the 13-point tiebreaker game, the teams changed ends. During the changeover, Cascades scoreboard operator Bruce Below said, "You guys are in trouble now." King and Ruffels glared at Below, and King yelled, "Do you work for the team?" Below replied that he did, and King said, "Well, then shut up. If you're working for them you shouldn't be saying anything." The Cascades won two of the next three points to win the super tiebreaker, 7–2, and earn the victory in the match. After the final point, Ruffels charged Below, grabbed him by the neck and shook him. He needed to be restrained by the umpire, Brian Howell, and his linesman. King then started screaming at Howell and also approached him, grabbing and shoving him. King slammed her racquet on the scorer's table in anger.

The Cascades finished the 1978 season with the best record in franchise history at 20 wins and 24 losses, fourth in the Western Division. Despite their fifth straight losing season, they qualified for the playoffs for the second time in a row.

The Cascades met the Western Division Champion San Diego Friars in the WTT Quarterfinals and dropped the first match in San Diego, 30–22, on August 15, losing four straight sets after Gorman and Stewart took the opening set of men's doubles from Rod Laver and Ross Case. The Cascades hosted the second match in Seattle on August 17, and posted a 28–20 victory to stave off elimination. Gorman overcame a 4–1 deficit to take the men's singles set, 6–4, against Laver. Redondo took the women's singles set from Kerry Reid, 6–4, after trailing, 4–2. Stöve and Cuypers took the opening set of the match with a 6–3 set win against Kerry Reid and Mona Guerrant. Stewart and Gorman took the men's doubles set from Laver and Case, 6–3. The series returned to San Diego for the third match on August 18. The Friars opened the match with a set win in women's doubles by Guerrant and Kerry Reid, 7–6, over Stöve and Cuypers. The Cascades took a 12–10 lead when Gorman beat Laver, 6–3, in men's singles. They extended their lead to 18–12 when Gorman and Stewart topped Laver and Raz Reid, 6–2, in men's doubles. Redondo fell behind, 3–1, and then rallied to win five straight games in women's singles against Kerry Reid to extend the Cascades' lead to 24–15. Stöve and Kachel closed out the match with a mixed doubles set win against Raz Reid and Janet Young, 7–5, for a 31–20 victory.

The Cascades then lost to the Boston Lobsters in the WTT Semifinals.

On September 28, 1978, Kelleher announced that the Cascades would not be in Seattle for the 1979 season, because it was not "economically feasible." Attendance in 1978 averaged approximately 1,695 per match, down from 3,100 in 1977. Kelleher mentioned that a group in Houston had shown interest in the team and that there were other candidates as well. "It's really kind of funny," Kelleher said, "We've had three or four cities come out of the woodwork recently with offers."

Following the 1978 season, between October 27 and November 9, the New York Apples, Boston Lobsters, Los Angeles Strings, San Diego Friars and Indiana Loves all announced that they were folding, cutting the size of WTT from 10 teams to five. On the following day, the Cascades, Anaheim Oranges and New Orleans Sun Belt Nets announced that they were folding as well.

== Season-by-season records ==
The following table shows regular season records, playoff results and titles won by the Seattle Cascades franchise since its founding in 1974.

Year	Team Name	W	L	PCT	Playoff result	Titles won
1974	Hawaii Leis	14	30	.318	Missed playoffs	
1975	Hawaii Leis	14	32	.304	Missed playoffs	
1976	Hawaii Leis	12	32	.273	Missed playoffs	
1977	Sea-Port Cascades	18	26	.409	Lost in Western Division Semifinals	
1978	Seattle Cascades	20	24	.455	Won WTT Quarterfinals; Lost in WTT Semifinals	
Subtotals	Hawaii Leis	40	94	.299	WTT Finals: 0 wins, 0 losses, – All Playoff Series: 0 wins, 0 losses, –	
Subtotals	Sea-Port Cascades; Seattle Cascades	38	50	.432	WTT Finals: 0 wins, 0 losses, – All Playoff Series: 1 win, 2 losses, .333	
Grand; Totals		78	144	.351	WTT Finals: 0 wins, 0 losses, – All Playoff Series: 1 win, 2 losses, .333	None

== Home courts ==
The following table shows primary home venues used by the Seattle Cascades franchise.

Venue	Location	Duration	
Venue	Location	Start	End
Honolulu International Center	Honolulu, Hawaii	1974	1976
Student Council Gymnasium	Honolulu, Hawaii	1974	1974
Royal Lahaina Tennis Ranch	Lāhainā, Maui County, Hawaii	1975	1975
Seattle Center Coliseum	Seattle, Washington	1977	1978
Mercer Arena	Seattle, Washington	1977	1978
Veterans Memorial Coliseum	Portland, Oregon	1977	1977
Pamplin Sports Center	Portland, Oregon	1977	1977

Honolulu International Center and Student Council Gymnasium both served as primary home venues in 1974. Honolulu International Center and Royal Lahaina Tennis Ranch both served as primary home venues in 1975. Seattle Center Coliseum, Mercer Arena and Veterans Memorial Coliseum all served as primary home venues in 1977. One home playoff match was played at Pamplin Sports Center in 1977. Seattle Center Coliseum and Mercer Arena both served as primary home venues in 1978. The Leis also played three 1976 home matches in Seattle and three in Portland. In 1978, the Cascades played one home match in Portland, one in Corvallis, Oregon and one in Boise, Idaho.

== Individual honors ==
The following table shows individual honors bestowed upon players and coaches of the Seattle Cascades franchise.

Year	Player/Coach	Award
1977	Betty Stöve	Female All-Star Match Most Valuable Player

== Hall of Fame players ==
The following players who are enshrined in the International Tennis Hall of Fame played for the Seattle Cascades franchise:

- Butch Buchholz
- Margaret Court
- Owen Davidson
- Ilie Năstase
- John Newcombe
- Dennis Ralston

== Final roster ==
The Seattle Cascades final roster for the 1978 season was

- (United States) Tom Gorman, Player-Coach
- (South Africa) Brigitte Cuypers
- (Australia) Chris Kachel
- (United States) Marita Redondo
- (United States) Sherwood Stewart
- (Netherlands) Betty Stöve

== See also ==
- World TeamTennis
