= San Diego Friars (1975–1978) =

- Sport: Team tennis
- Founded: 1975
- Folded: November 8, 1978
- League: World TeamTennis
- Division: Western
- Team history: San Diego Friars; 1975–1978
- Colors: Peruvian Brown, Black
- Owner: Frank Mariani
- President: G. Allan Kingston
- Head coach: Rod Laver
- General manager: G. Allan Kingston
- Championships: None
- Division titles: 1978
- Playoff berths: 1977, 1978

The San Diego Friars were a World TeamTennis (WTT) team based in San Diego, California. The Friars were founded as an expansion franchise in 1975. The team qualified for the WTT playoffs twice in their four seasons and won the 1978 Western Division Championship. The Friars folded following the 1978 season.

== Team history ==
=== Founding and inaugural season ===
San Diego Friars logo used in 1975.

The Friars were founded by aerospace engineer and real estate developer Frank Mariani as the first expansion franchise of WTT just before the start of the 1975 season, and played most of their home matches at the San Diego Sports Arena. Some home matches were played at the Anaheim Convention Center. The Friars played a 46-match WTT regular-season schedule in 1975. The league used neutral-site matches to cut down on travel and create events where fans could see multiple teams either with one admission or over the course of a few days. These special events were called WTT Spectaculars. Because of these and because of scheduling challenges created when the Houston E-Z Riders suspended operations just days before the season started, the 10 teams in the league did not play an equal number of matches. Seven of them played 44 matches, while the Friars, Boston Lobsters and Hawaii Leis each played 46 matches. The Friars were led by player-coach Dennis Ralston and also featured Anand Amritraj (Tamil: ஆனந்த் அம்ரித்ராஜ்), John Andrews, Brigitte Cuypers, Lesley Hunt and Janet Young. The Friars finished their inaugural season with 14 wins and 32 losses tied with the Leis for last place in the Western Division and the worst record in WTT.

=== Arrival of Laver ===
The Friars' top choices in the 1975 draft were Linky Boshoff, Nancy Gunter, Janice Metcalf, Charles Pasarell, Kazuko Sawamatsu (Japanese: 沢松和子). They left player-coach Dennis Ralston unprotected, and he was selected by the Pittsburgh Triangles in the second round. On February 16, 1976, after securing permission to negotiate from the Phoenix Racquets, the Friars signed the legendary Rod Laver to a contract for an undisclosed amount and an undisclosed length but which reportedly made him the highest-paid player in WTT history. The Friars also signed Cliff Drysdale and named him their player-coach. Other players taking the court for the 1976 Friars were Ross Case, Terry Holladay and Betty Ann Grubb Stuart. The team hired Larry Willens as an assistant coach. The Friars struggled again in 1976, finishing with 13 wins and 31 losses, fourth place in the Western Division. Despite the team's poor performance, Laver was named WTT Male Rookie of the Year.

=== First playoff berth ===
Cliff Drysdale and Rod Laver returned to the team in 1977. They signed Mona Guerrant, Julie Anthony and Kerry Reid. Ross Case went to the Phoenix Racquets and became their player-coach. The Friars finished the 1977 season with 21 wins and 23 losses, third place in the Western Division and qualified for the WTT playoffs.

The Friars opened the best-of-three Western Division Semifinals against the two-time defending Western Division Champion San Francisco Golden Gaters at Oakland–Alameda County Coliseum Arena on August 16, with a 24–22 victory. The Golden Gaters appeared to be on their way to victory leading 17–12 after three sets. Reid won the fourth set of women's singles, 6–1, against former Friar Terry Holladay to ties the match at 18. The following night, the Friars played their first home playoff match in franchise history and defeated the Golden Gaters, 24–21, to advance to the Western Division Championship Series. The Golden Gaters took a 20–18 lead to the final set of men's doubles. Drysdale and Laver defeated Tom Okker and Frew McMillan, 6–1, in the final set to win the match and the series.

The Friars met the Phoenix Racquets in the first match of the Western Division Championship Series at the Arizona Veterans Memorial Coliseum on August 20. Guerrant was the hero for the Friars taking part in two set wins playing doubles. She teamed with Reid to beat Chris Evert and Kristien Shaw in women's doubles, 6–2, and with Laver to beat Shaw and former Friar Ross Case in mixed doubles, 7–5. The Friars had a chance to win the series in San Diego on August 22, and the Racquets staved off elimination with a 27–20 victory despite Guerrant and Reid earning another 6–2 set win over Evert and Shaw. The series returned to Phoenix on August 23, and the Racquets cruised to a 30–22 win to eliminate the Friars.

=== A division championship ===
The Friars selected Tim Gullikson in the second round of the 1977 draft, but were unable to sign him. on March 8, 1978, the Friars traded Cliff Drysdale to the Anaheim Oranges for a first-round draft choice and cash. Following the trade, the Friars named Rod Laver as their new player-coach. Mona Guerrant and Kerry Reid returned to the team. The Friars signed Grover Raz Reid and re-signed their former players, Ross Case and Janet Young. The Friars had the first winning season in franchise history in 1978, posting 30 wins and 14 losses and winning the Western Division Championship which for the first time in WTT history was determined based on regular-season and not playoff results.

The Friars opened the best-of-three WTT Quarterfinals at home with a dominant victory over the Seattle Cascades, 30–22, on August 15. After Laver and Case dropped the opening set in men's doubles, 6–4, to Tom Gorman and Sherwood Stewart, the Friars won the next four sets. Laver had a 6–2 set win over Gorman in men's singles. Guerrant and Case took the mixed doubles set, 6–3, over Stewart and Brigitte Cuypers. Guerrant and Kerry Reid took the women's doubles set from Betty Stöve and Cuypers, 7–5. Reid squeaked past Stove in women's singles in a tiebreaker, 7–6. In the second match in Seattle on August 17, the Cascades dominated the match in winning 28–20 to stave off elimination. The Friars returned to San Diego for the third match on August 18, and fell to the Cascades, 31–20. Guerrant and Kerry Reid took the opening set of women's doubles, 7–6, against Stöve and Cuypers. But the Cascades won the next four sets to take the match and the series.

On November 8, 1978, Friars owner Frank Mariani announced that the team was folding. Mariani said that rebuilding the team, "will involve more expense than I am willing to undertake."

== Season-by-season records ==
The following table shows regular season records, playoff results and titles won by the San Diego Friars.

Year	W	L	PCT	Playoff result	Titles won
1975	14	32	.304	Missed playoffs	
1976	13	31	.295	Missed playoffs	
1977	21	23	.477	Won Western Division Semifinals; Lost in Western Division Championship Series	
1978	30	14	.682	Lost in WTT Quarterfinals	Western Division Champions
Totals	78	100	.438	WTT Finals: 0 wins, 0 losses, – All Playoff Series: 1 win, 2 losses, .333	WTT Champions - 0 Western Division Champions - 1 (1978)

== Home courts ==
The following table shows home courts used by the San Diego Friars.

Venue	Location	Duration		Notes
Venue	Location	Start	End	Notes
San Diego Sports Arena	San Diego, California	1975	1978	Primary home venue
Anaheim Convention Center	Anaheim, California	1975	1977	Alternate home venue

== Individual honors ==
The following table shows individual honors bestowed upon players and coaches of the San Diego Friars.

Year	Player/Coach	Award
1976	Rod Laver	Male Rookie of the Year

== Hall of Fame players ==
The following players who are enshrined in the International Tennis Hall of Fame played for the San Diego Friars:

- Rod Laver
- Dennis Ralston

== Final roster ==
The San Diego Friars final roster for the 1978 season was

- (Australia) Rod Laver, Player-Coach
- (United States) Larry Willens, Assistant Coach
- (Australia) Ross Case
- (United States) Mona Guerrant
- (United States) Grover Raz Reid
- (Australia) Kerry Reid
- (Australia) Janet Young

== See also ==
- World TeamTennis
