= Chicago Smash =

American tennis team

- Sport: Team tennis
- Founded: 2020
- Closed: 2021
- League: World TeamTennis
- Based in: Chicago, Illinois
- Colors: Chicago Blue, Smash Red
- Owner: World TeamTennis
- Head coach: Kamau Murray
- General manager: Jocelyn Davie
- Website: chicagosmash.com

The Chicago Smash was a World TeamTennis (WTT) franchise founded in 2020, owned by the league. The team was the third expansion team in two years to enter the league in 2020 following the addition of the Orlando Storm and Vegas Rollers during the 2019 season. The Chicago Smash's official home stadium was Credit Union 1 Arena in Chicago, Illinois. However, the team never played there as World TeamTennis played its entire 2020 season at The Greenbrier in White Sulphur Springs, West Virginia and its entire 2021 season at Indian Wells Tennis Garden in California. The Smash did not return for WTT's next season in 2026.

== Team rosters ==
=== 2020 roster ===
- (United States) Sloane Stephens
- (United States) Bethanie Mattek-Sands
- (United States) Evan King
- (United States) Rajeev Ram
- (Canada) Eugenie Bouchard
- (United States) Brandon Nakashima
- (United States) Head Coach, Kamau Murray
