= Vegas Rollers =

World TeamTennis professional team

- Sport: Team tennis
- Founded: 2019
- League: World TeamTennis
- Based in: Las Vegas, Nevada
- Stadium: Orleans Arena
- Colors: Vegas Blue, Rollers Gold
- Owner: World TeamTennis
- President: Ryan Wolfington
- Head coach: Tim Blenkiron
- General manager: Sally Dewhurst
- Website: vegasrollerstennis.com

The Vegas Rollers were a World TeamTennis (WTT) franchise founded in 2019, owned by the league. The team was one of two expansion teams to enter the league in 2019 alongside Orlando Storm. The Vegas Rollers play their home matches at the Orleans Arena in Paradise, Nevada. The official Charity is the Marty Hennessy - Inspiring Children Foundation.

== Team rosters ==
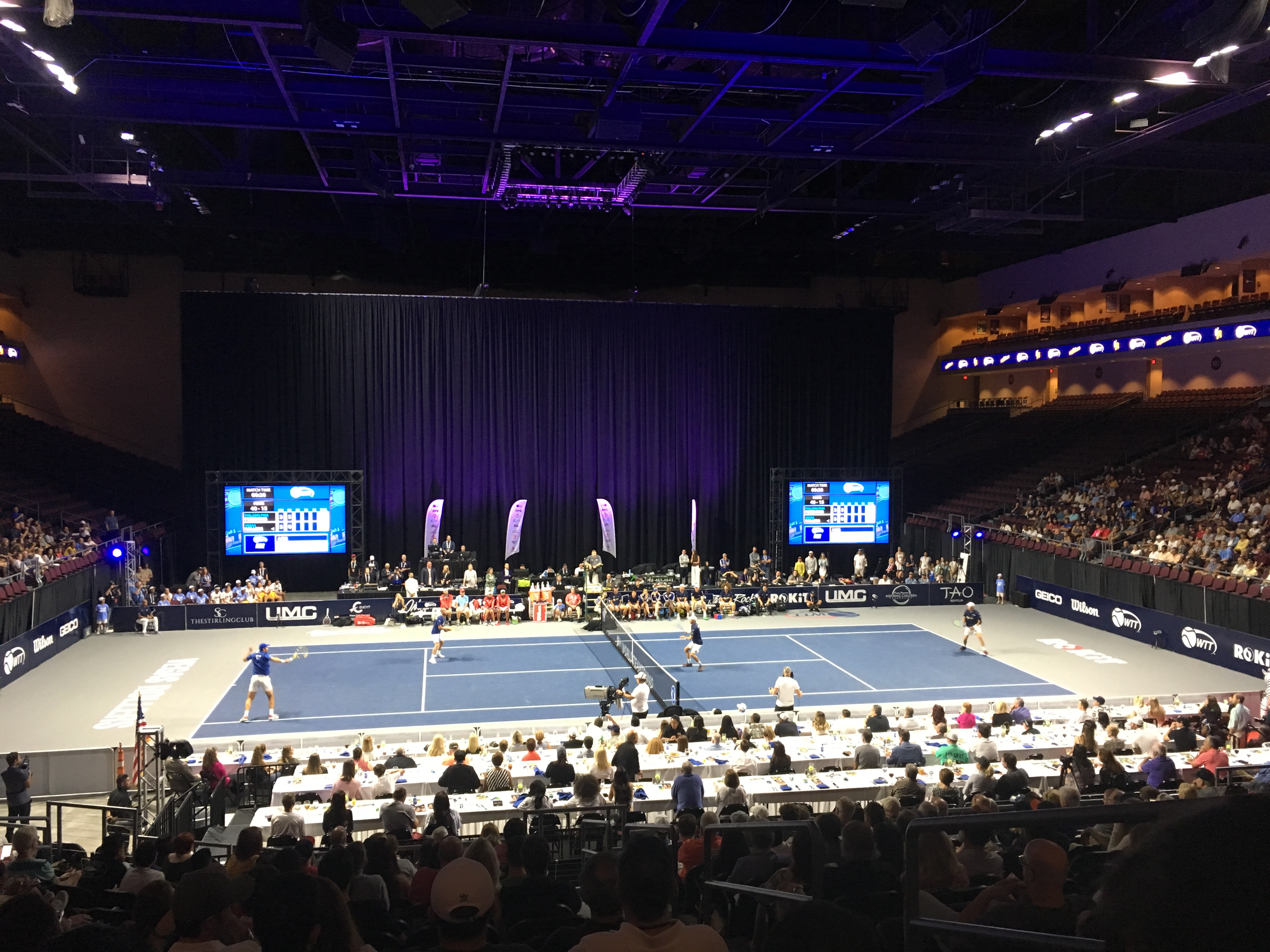
A Vegas Rollers home match at Orleans Arena in 2019.

=== 2019 roster ===
- (United States) Bob Bryan
- (United States) Mike Bryan
- (United States) Reilly Opelka
- (United States) Sam Querrey
- (Puerto Rico) Monica Puig
- (United States) Evan Song
- (United Kingdom) Harriet Dart
- (United States) Asia Muhammad
- (Australia) Matt Reid
- (Australia) Head Coach, Tim Blenkiron
