= World TeamTennis =

Tennis team competition

- Most recent season or competition: 2021
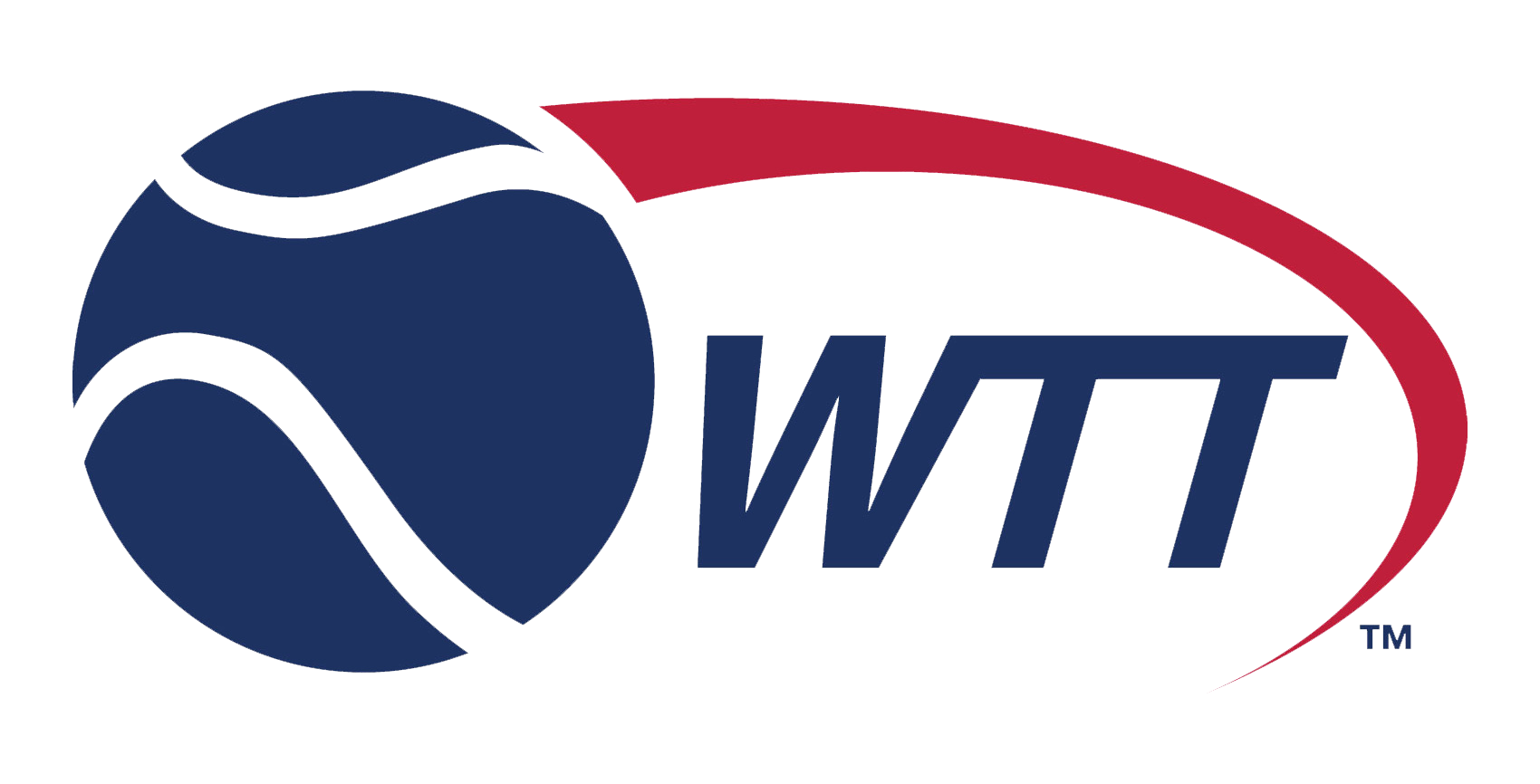
- Sport: Team tennis
- Founded: 1974
- Owners: Fred Luddy and Eric Davidson
- COO: Allen Hardison
- No. of teams: 3
- Country: United States
- Headquarters: Rancho Santa Fe, California, United States
- Most recent champion: Orange County Breakers
- Most titles: Sacramento Capitals (6); Washington Kastles (6)
- Broadcasters: US; CBS; CBS Sports Network (also available in CAN); ESPN; ESPN+ Tennis Channel; Facebook; Outside US and CAN; FITE TV; TennisONE; Latin America; Claro TV; China; Youku
- Website: WTT.com

World TeamTennis (WTT) is a mixed-gender professional tennis league played with a team format in the United States, which was founded in 1974.

The league's season normally took place in the summer months. Players from the ATP and WTA would often take a break from their tour schedules to partake in World TeamTennis.

WTT was the first professional sports league to grant equal status to each man and woman competing for their teams.

Many top tennis players have participated in the league over the years, including Billie Jean King, Rod Laver, Björn Borg, Ilie Nastase, Chris Evert, John McEnroe, Evonne Goolagong, Jimmy Connors, Martina Navratilova, Andre Agassi, Pete Sampras, Michael Chang, Serena Williams, Venus Williams, Lindsay Davenport, Kim Clijsters, Martina Hingis, John Isner, Andy Roddick, Sam Querrey, Sloane Stephens, Naomi Osaka, and Frances Tiafoe.

WTT has not hosted any matches or tournaments since 2021, but has since announced plans to relaunch in December 2026.

== Format ==
Originally played on a no-line court, each match consisted of five sets. Each set featured a different configuration (men's singles, men's doubles, women's singles, women's doubles, and mixed doubles). Prior to each match, coaches would decide the order in which the sets would be played. Each player on a team usually played in at least one of the five sets. Scoring was no-advantage; there was no requirement to win a game by two points; at deuce, whoever scores the next point wins the game. The first team to reach five games wins each set. A nine-point tiebreaker is played if a set reaches four-all. One point is awarded for each game won. If necessary, extended play and a supertiebreaker were played to determine the winner of the match.

The original league format included a four-colored tennis court, a 44-contest season, and teams of at least two men and two women. A match consisted of the first player or team to win five games, with a nine-point tiebreaker at four-all, and no-ad scoring in women's singles and doubles, men's singles and doubles, and mixed doubles.

== Courts ==
For much of World Team Tennis' history, its distinct court was an instant symbol for fans to recognize what they were watching. The iconic four-color (calico) court originated in the early 1970s and was unveiled for the third season in 1976. It was originally created to eliminate court lines (no-line court). Originally, the service boxes were blue and green, the baseline area brown and the doubles alleys maroon. These colors were chosen to represent the different tennis court surfaces: green for grass, blue for hard, maroon for clay and brown for dirt.

The league's technicolor playing surface served as a trendsetter for the rest of the tennis world. The Indian Wells Masters has purple courts.

Over time, lines were introduced to WTT's courts, purple replaced the brown and they reverted to traditional solid-colored courts. But in 2006, the league returned full-time to the signature calico/checkerboard pattern.

In 2019, the league made efforts to modernize and update its look and branding, including a switch to a deep blue playing surface and gray outer court. In partnership with DecoTurf, these colors were determined to be the best for livestreaming and television.

== First league ==
=== Founding ===
WTT was founded in 1973 by Dennis Murphy, Dick Butera, Fred Barman, Jordan Kaiser, and attorney and promoter Larry King, each of whom organized and owned the various participating teams of the fledgling professional tennis league. Murphy had previously founded the World Hockey Association, and gave a number of WHA club owners preferential options on WTT franchises.

Charles "Chuck" Reichblum (now popularly known as "Dr. Knowledge"), industrialist John H. Hillman III, and lawyer William "Bill" Sutton, who became the owners of the Pittsburgh Triangles, had, in 1972, founded the similar National Tennis League (NTL), a forerunner to WTT and Reichblum's brainchild. Founding members of WTT were reported to have been invited to join the NTL prior to formation of the competing WTT in 1973.

=== Teams, 1974–1978 ===
In 1974, Billie Jean King began the first WTT season by securing the professional women tennis players. Arthur Ashe and Wilt Chamberlain helped to secure the professional men tennis players. Two WTT players, Connors and Goolagong, were not allowed to participate in the 1974 French Open due to their associations with WTT. Connors' exclusion from the French Open denied him the opportunity to become the first male player since Rod Laver to win all four Major singles titles in a calendar year.

The league began play in May 1974, with George MacCall as Commissioner of the 16 teams, many with tennis-themed nicknames. The Eastern Division consisted of the Atlantic Section: Baltimore Banners, Boston Lobsters, New York Sets, Philadelphia Freedoms; and the Central Section: Cleveland Nets, Detroit Loves, Pittsburgh Triangles, Toronto-Buffalo Royals. The Western Division consisted of the Gulf Plains Section: Chicago Aces, Florida Flamingos, Houston E-Z Riders, Minnesota Buckskins; and the Pacific Section: Denver Racquets, Hawaii Leis, Los Angeles Strings, San Francisco Golden Gaters.

Following the initial 1974 season several teams moved, folded, or failed to meet the financial requirements of the league, and the league also added one expansion team, the San Diego Friars. For the 1975 season World Team Tennis consisted of 10 teams, and it remained with that number of teams throughout the rest of the existence of the first league.

The teams that played from 1974 to 1978 were:

- Boston Lobsters (1974)
- Chicago Aces (1974)
- Cincinnati (never played) / Cleveland Nets (1974–1976) / Cleveland-Pittsburgh Nets (1977) / New Orleans Sun Belt Nets (1978)
- Dallas (1979 expansion franchise – never played)
- Denver Racquets (1974) / Phoenix Racquets (1975–1978)
- Detroit Loves (1974) / Indiana Loves (1975–1978)
- Golden Gate Otters (never played) / San Francisco Golden Gaters (1974–1978)
- Houston E-Z Riders (1974)
- Los Angeles (1979 expansion franchise – never played)
- Los Angeles Strings (1974–1978)
- Minnesota Buckskins (1974)
- New York Sets (1974–1976) / New York Apples (1977–1978)
- Pennsylvania Keystones (never played) / Soviet National Team (1977, often simply called "The Soviets") / Anaheim Oranges (1978)
- Philadelphia Freedoms (1974) / Boston Lobsters (1975–1978) (Elton John, a friend of Billie Jean King, wrote the hit single "Philadelphia Freedom" as a theme song for his favorite team.)
- Phoenix (never played) / Baltimore Banners (1974)
- Pittsburgh Triangles (1974–1976)
- St. Louis (never played) / Florida Flamingos (1974)
- San Diego (1979 expansion franchise – never played)
- San Diego Friars (1975–1978)
- San Diego Swingers (never played) / Hawaii Leis (1974–1976) / Sea-Port Cascades (1977) / Seattle Cascades (1978)
- Toronto-Buffalo Royals (1974) / Hartford Royals (never played)

WTT was the first professional sports experience for Jerry Buss (eventual owner of the NBA's Los Angeles Lakers and the NHL's Los Angeles Kings), and for Bob Kraft (eventual owner of the NFL's New England Patriots and MLS's New England Revolution).

=== All-star games and MVPs ===
WTT also held annual All-Star games for the seasons from 1975 to 1978. Marty Riessen (Cleveland) and Greer Stevens (Boston) won Most Valuable Players (MVP) honors for the inaugural all-star gala won by the East, 28–21, at the Inglewood Forum in Los Angeles. In 1976 the West All-Stars, led by Chris Evert and Betty Stöve, capped an incredible comeback when they defeated Billie Jean King and Evonne Goolagong in a super tiebreaker, 5–4, giving the West a stunning 28–27 overtime victory at the Oakland–Alameda County Coliseum. After trailing at one stage by 24–17, the West, led by Stove and Dianne Fromholtz, won the final set plus two games in overtime to draw the West All-Stars even at 27. Tom Okker (San Francisco) and Dianne Fromholtz (Los Angeles) won MVP honors that year. In the 1977 All Star Game held at the San Diego Sports Arena, Björn Borg (Cleveland–Pittsburgh) and Betty Stöve (Seattle–Portland) captured MVP awards as the East bested the West, 23–18. WTT held its final All-Star event in Las Vegas in 1978.

=== Ending ===
The first league ended play in 1978.

== Second league ==
=== 1981–1991 ===
League play resumed in 1981 as TeamTennis, with four California teams, expanding to eight teams in 1982. In 2005, the league had twelve teams.

In 1984, Billie Jean King became Commissioner and major owner of the league, following her retirement from tournament tennis competition.

In 1985 a recreational league for non-professionals was added, which was co-branded with the professional league.

=== 1992–1999 ===
In 1992, the name of the league was changed back to World TeamTennis.

- Minnesota Penguins, 1993
- Idaho Sneakers, 1994–1997
- New Jersey Stars, 1987–1995 (relocated and became the Delaware Smash)
- Phoenix Smash, 1992–1994

=== 2000–2021 ===
In 2000 the current logo was adopted. In February 2001, Billie Jean King retired as commissioner and Ilana Kloss became the new commissioner.

In 2005 and 2006 the league consisted of 12 teams and in 2007 the Hartford FoxForce ceased operations. Prior to the 2008 season, the Houston Wranglers ceased operations and the Washington Kastles joined the league. In the 2009 season, 10 teams competed: Boston, New York Buzz, New York Sportime, Philadelphia, Washington, D.C., Kansas City, Newport Beach, Sacramento, Springfield, and St. Louis. Sacramento won the year-end championship six times.

Before the start of the 2011 season the New York Buzz and the New York Sportimes merged into one New York team, the Sportimes. During the 2011 season the Washington Kastles completed a perfect 16–0 schedule, winning their second championship in three seasons.

In 2012, the Washington Kastles completed their second consecutive perfect season, going 16–0 for the second season in a row to become the first professional sports franchise to go two complete seasons without a loss. Their 32-match winning streak is one shy of the major professional sports record of 33 consecutive wins set by the 1971–72 Los Angeles Lakers of the National Basketball Association. They began the next season with 2 wins making their streak 34 games, setting the new record.

In 2013, World TeamTennis was renamed Mylan World TeamTennis after Mylan, a generics and specialty pharmaceuticals company, signed a three-year deal as the title sponsor. The Kansas City Explorers relocated to Irving, Texas, and became the Texas Wild. On November 21, 2013, the Orange County Breakers were sold, relocated to Austin, Texas and renamed the Austin Aces. On January 16, 2014, the New York Sportimes were sold, relocated to San Diego and renamed the San Diego Aviators. On February 4, 2014, the Sacramento Capitals were relocated to Las Vegas and renamed the Las Vegas Neon. On March 5, 2014, the Las Vegas Neon franchise was terminated, leaving the league with seven teams.

On February 23, 2015, WTT announced that a new ownership group had taken control of the Texas Wild and moved the team to Citrus Heights, California, renaming it the California Dream.

On January 13, 2016, WTT announced that the California Dream franchise had been terminated. On February 17, 2016, the Boston Lobsters had ceased operations and had been replaced with a new franchise called the New York Empire.

In March 2017, Billie Jean King announced the sale of her majority share in WTT to venture capitalist Mark Ein, the founder and owner of the Washington Kastles, and Fred Luddy, the founder of ServiceNow and owner of the San Diego Aviators.

In January 2019, Carlos Silva became the CEO and ushered in new deals with CBS and ESPN creating the largest-ever audience for WTT on July 21, 2019, on a CBS broadcast.

In March 2019, the league announced its expansion to eight teams for the 2019 season, with the creation of the Orlando Storm and the Vegas Rollers.

On October 23, 2019, the league announced it would be awarding a record $5 million in prize money, including an additional $1 million for the postseason, during its 45th season and would be expanding again, adding two new franchises in 2020.

In February 2020, the league announced its expansion to nine teams for the 2020 season with the Chicago Smash.

In June 2020, WTT announced it would be the first major professional tennis league to resume operations since the outbreak of the COVID-19 pandemic. The league committed to play the entirety of its 45th season at The Greenbrier in White Sulphur Springs, West Virginia from July 12 through August 2.

In March 2021, Carlos Silva stepped down as CEO. The current COO is Allen Hardison. The 2021 season was played during November 13–28 at the Indian Wells Tennis Garden.

WTT announced it would not hold a 2022 season as a result of the COVID-19 pandemic. They promised to return in 2023 with new expansion teams, but did not do so until 2026.

=== 2026 relaunch ===
On May 19, 2026, WTT announced the 2026 relaunch of their league featuring a rebranded spelling, World Team Tennis.

On July 22, 2026, WTT announced that their relaunched 47th season would be based in three markets: New York at Barclays Centre in Brooklyn; Florida at Amerant Bank Arena in Sunrise, Florida; and Toronto at Coca-Cola Coliseum. The season will feature six matches in all, with each team playing two home matches and two road matches.

On August 20, 2026, WTT announced the three club names as well as a player who will represent each club: New York Empire Racquet Club (Tommy Paul), Florida Flamingos Racquet Club (Jessica Pegula), & Toronto North Racquet Club (Denis Shapovalov).

The 2026 season will be played between December 1 and December 15.

== Current teams ==
The following teams are scheduled to play the 2026 season.

Team	City	Arena
Florida Flamingos	Sunrise, Florida	Amerant Bank Arena
New York Empire	Brooklyn, New York	Barclays Center
Toronto North	Toronto, Ontario	Coca-Cola Coliseum

== Teams at time of league folding ==
Team	City	Arena
Chicago Smash	Chicago, Illinois	Credit Union 1 Arena
New York Empire	New York City, New York	Cary Leeds Center for Tennis & Learning
Orange County Breakers	Newport Beach, California	Palisades Tennis Club
Orlando Storm	Orlando, Florida	USTA National Campus
Philadelphia Freedoms	Philadelphia, Pennsylvania	Michael J. Hagan Arena
San Diego Aviators	Carlsbad, California	Omni La Costa Resort and Spa
Springfield Lasers	Springfield, Missouri	Mediacom Stadium at Cooper Tennis Complex
Vegas Rollers	Paradise, Nevada	Orleans Arena
Washington Kastles	Washington, D.C.	Kastles Stadium at Union Market

== Former teams ==
Team	City	Arena	Years Played
Denver Racquets	Denver, Colorado	Denver Auditorium Arena	1974
Detroit Loves	Detroit, Michigan	Cobo Arena	1974
Houston E-Z Riders	Houston, Texas; San Antonio, Texas	Sam Houston Coliseum; HemisFair Arena	1974
Minnesota Buckskins	Bloomington, Minnesota	Metropolitan Sports Center	1974
Toronto-Buffalo Royals	Toronto, Ontario, Canada; Buffalo, New York	CNE Coliseum; Buffalo Memorial Auditorium	1974
Baltimore Banners	Baltimore, Maryland	Baltimore Civic Center	1974
Boston Lobsters	Boston, Massachusetts	Walter Brown Arena	1974–1975
Chicago Aces	Chicago, Illinois	Lakeshore Racquet Club	1974–1975; 1982
Florida Flamingos	Miami Beach, Florida	Miami Beach Convention Center	1974–1975
Cleveland Nets	Cleveland, Ohio; Richfield, Ohio	Richfield Coliseum	1974–1976
New York Sets	Uniondale, New York	Nassau Coliseum	1974–1976
Pittsburgh Triangles	Pittsburgh, Pennsylvania	Civic Arena	1974–1976
San Francisco Golden Gaters	Oakland, California	Oakland Arena	1974–1978
San Diego Friars	San Diego, California; Anaheim, California	San Diego Sports Arena; Anaheim Convention Center	1974–1978; 1981–1983
Phoenix Racquets	Phoenix, Arizona	Arizona Veterans Memorial Coliseum	1975–1978
Indiana Loves	Indianapolis, Indiana	Indiana Convention Center; Market Square Arena	1975–1978; 1983
Los Angeles Strings	Los Angeles, California; Inglewood, California	Los Angeles Memorial Sports Arena; Inglewood Forum	1974–1978; 1981–1993
The Soviets		None	1977
Cleveland-Pittsburgh Nets	Richfield, Ohio; Pittsburgh, Pennsylvania	Richfield Coliseum; Civic Arena	1977
Sea-Port Cascades	Portland, Oregon; Seattle, Washington	Veterans Memorial Coliseum; Seattle Center Coliseum; Mercer Arena	1977
New York Apples	New York, New York	Madison Square Garden; Felt Forum	1977–1978
New Orleans Sun Belt Nets	New Orleans, Louisiana	Louisiana Superdome	1978
Seattle Cascades	Seattle, Washington	Veterans Memorial Coliseum; Seattle Center Coliseum; Mercer Arena	1978
Anaheim Oranges	Anaheim, California	Anaheim Convention Center	1978
Oakland Breakers	Oakland, California	Oakland Arena	1981–1982
California Oranges	Anaheim, California	Anaheim Convention Center	1981–1983
Phoenix Sunsets	Phoenix, Arizona	Arizona Veterans Memorial Coliseum	1982
Arizona Racquets	Phoenix, Arizona	Arizona Veterans Memorial Coliseum	1982
Dallas Stars	Dallas, Texas	Reunion Arena	1982–1983
Houston Astro-Knots	Houston, Texas	Houston Summit	1982–1983
Chicago Fyre	Chicago, Illinois	Daley Tennis Center	1983
St. Louis Eagles	St. Louis, Missouri	St. Louis Arena	1984
San Diego Buds	San Diego, California	San Diego Sports Arena	1984–1985
St. Louis Slims	St. Louis, Missouri	St. Louis Arena	1985
Oakland Aces	Oakland, California	Oakland Arena	1985–1986
Boston Bays	Bedford, Massachusetts; Newton, Massachusetts	Stouffer’s Bedford Glen Hotel; Longwood Cricket Club	1985–1986
Chicago Fire	Chicago, Illinois	Daley Tennis Center	1985–1986
Miami Beach Breakers	Miami Beach, Florida; Boca Raton, Florida; Aventura, Florida	Abel Holtz Stadium; Boca Grove Plantation; Turnberry Country Club	1985–1987; 1990–1991
San Antonio Racquets	San Antonio, Texas	McFarlin Tennis Center	1985–1994
Sacramento Capitals	North Sacramento, California; Gold River, California; Citrus Heights, California; Roseville, California	ARCO Arena; Gold River Racquet Club; Sunrise Mall; Westfield Galleria	1986–2013
Charlotte Heat	Charlotte, North Carolina	Olde Providence Racquet Club; Charlotte Coliseum	1987–1991
New Jersey Stars	Franklin Township, New Jersey; Chatham Borough, New Jersey; Florham Park, New Jersey; Princeton, New Jersey	Somerset Hilton; Center Court Tennis Club; Hamilton Park Conference Center; The Forrestal at Princeton	1987–1995
South Florida Breakers	Deerfield Beach, Florida	Deer Creek Country Club	1988
Wellington Aces	Wellington, Florida	Wellington Club West	1989
Fresno Sun-Nets	Fresno, California		1988–1989
Portland Panthers	Beaverton, Oregon	Tualatin Hills Tennis Center	1988–1989
Raleigh Edge	Raleigh, North Carolina	Raleigh Convention Center	1990–1993
Newport Beach Dukes	Newport Beach, California	John Wayne Tennis Club	1990–1994
Wichita Advantage	Wichita, Kansas	Riverside Tennis Complex	1991–1995
Atlanta Thunder	Atlanta, Georgia	Peachtree World of Tennis	1991–1996
Tampa Bay Action	Tampa, Florida	Tampa Convention Center	1992
Vail Eagles	Vail, Colorado	Vail Tennis Center	1992
St. Louis Aces	St. Louis, Missouri	Dwight Davis Tennis Center	1994-2011

== Finals ==
Year	Champion	Runner-up	Score
1974	Denver Racquets	Philadelphia Freedoms	55–45
1975	Pittsburgh Triangles	San Francisco Golden Gaters	74–65
1976	New York Sets	San Francisco Golden Gaters	91–57
1977	New York Apples	Phoenix Racquets	55–39
1978	Los Angeles Strings	Boston Lobsters	108–93
1979–1980 no tournament
1981	Los Angeles Strings	regular season champion, no playoffs	
1982	Dallas Stars	Phoenix Sunsets	27–22
1983	Chicago Fyre	Los Angeles Strings	26–20
1984	San Diego Buds	Long Beach Breakers	30–13
1985	San Diego Buds	St. Louis Slims	25–24
1986	San Antonio Racquets	Sacramento Capitals	25–23
1987	Charlotte Heat	San Antonio Racquets	25–20
1988	Charlotte Heat	New Jersey Stars	27–22
1989	San Antonio Racquets	Sacramento Capitals	27–25
1990	Los Angeles Strings	Raleigh Edge	27–16
1991	Atlanta Thunder	Los Angeles Strings	27–16
1992	Atlanta Thunder	Newport Beach Dukes	30–17
1993	Wichita Advantage	Newport Beach Dukes	26–23
1994	New Jersey Stars	Idaho Sneakers	28–25
1995	New Jersey Stars	Atlanta Thunder	28–20
1996	St. Louis Aces	Delaware Smash	27–16
1997	Sacramento Capitals	regular season champion, finals rained out	
1998	Sacramento Capitals	New York OTBzz	30–13
1999	Sacramento Capitals	Springfield Lasers	23–15
2000	Sacramento Capitals	Delaware Smash	21–20
2001	Philadelphia Freedoms	Springfield Lasers	20–18
2002	Sacramento Capitals	New York Buzz	21–13
2003	Delaware Smash	Sacramento Capitals	21–14
2004	Newport Beach Breakers	Delaware Smash	23–17
2005	New York Sportimes	Newport Beach Breakers	21–18
2006	Philadelphia Freedoms	Newport Beach Breakers	21–14
2007	Sacramento Capitals	New York Buzz	24–20
2008	New York Buzz	Kansas City Explorers	21–18
2009	Washington Kastles	Springfield Lasers	23–20
2010	Kansas City Explorers	New York Sportimes	21–18
2011	Washington Kastles	St. Louis Aces	23–19
2012	Washington Kastles	Sacramento Capitals	20–19
2013	Washington Kastles	Springfield Lasers	25–12
2014	Washington Kastles	Springfield Lasers	25–13
2015	Washington Kastles	Austin Aces	24–18
2016	San Diego Aviators	Orange County Breakers	25–14
2017	Orange County Breakers	San Diego Aviators	22–18
2018	Springfield Lasers	Philadelphia Freedoms	19–18
2019	Springfield Lasers	New York Empire	20–19
2020	New York Empire	Chicago Smash	21–20
2021	Orange County Breakers	Springfield Lasers	21–13
2022–2025 no tournament

== Historical results ==
Current WTT teams are shown in bold, non-championship teams are shown in italics.

=== By team ===
#	Team	Titles	Runner-ups	Years won
1	Sacramento Capitals	6	4	1997, 1998, 1999, 2000, 2002, 2007
2	**Washington Kastles**	6	0	2009, 2011, 2012, 2013, 2014, 2015
3	Newport Beach/**Orange County Breakers**	3	3	2004, 2017, 2021
4	Los Angeles Strings	3	2	1978, 1981, 1990
5	**Springfield Lasers**	2	6	2018, 2019
6	**Philadelphia Freedoms**	2	2	2001, 2006
7	Atlanta Thunder	2	1	1991, 1992
7	New Jersey Stars	2	1	1994, 1995
7	San Antonio Racquets	2	1	1986, 1989
10	Charlotte Heat	2	0	1987, 1988
10	New York Sets/Apples	2	0	1976, 1977
10	San Diego Buds	2	0	1984, 1985
13	Delaware Smash	1	3	2003
13	New York OTBuzz/Buzz	1	3	2008
15	Denver/Phoenix Racquets	1	1	1974
15	Kansas City Explorers	1	1	2010
15	**New York Empire**	1	1	2020
15	New York Sportimes	1	1	2005
15	**San Diego Aviators**	1	1	2016
15	St. Louis Aces	1	1	1996
21	Chicago Fyre	1	0	1983
21	Dallas Stars	1	0	1982
21	Pittsburgh Triangles	1	0	1975
21	Wichita Advantage	1	0	1993
25	Newport Beach Dukes	0	2	
25	San Francisco Golden Gaters	0	2	
27	Austin Aces	0	1	
27	Boston Lobsters	0	1	
27	**Chicago Smash**	0	1	
27	Idaho Sneakers	0	1	
27	Long Beach Breakers	0	1	
27	Phoenix Sunsets	0	1	
27	Raleigh Edge	0	1	
27	St. Louis Slims	0	1	

=== By city ===
#	City	Team(s)	Titles	Runners-up
1	Sacramento, California	Capitals	6	4
2	Washington, D.C.	**Kastles**	6	0
3	New York City, New York	Sets/Apples, Sportimes, **Empire**	4	2
4	Newport Beach, California	Dukes, **Breakers**	3	5
5	Los Angeles, California	Strings	3	2
5	San Diego, California	Buds, **Aviators**	3	1
7	Springfield, Missouri	**Lasers**	2	6
8	Philadelphia, Pennsylvania	**Freedoms**	2	2
9	Atlanta, Georgia	Thunder	2	1
9	Franklin Township, New Jersey	Stars	2	1
9	San Antonio, Texas	Racquets	2	1
12	Charlotte, North Carolina	Heat	2	0
13	Albany, New York	OTBzz/Electrics/Buzz	1	3
13	Wilmington, Delaware	Smash	1	3
15	St. Louis, Missouri	Slims, Aces	1	2
16	Chicago, Illinois	Fyre, **Smash**	1	1
16	Kansas City, Missouri	Explorers	1	1
18	Dallas, Texas	Stars	1	0
18	Denver, Colorado	Racquets	1	0
18	Pittsburgh, Pennsylvania	Triangles	1	0
18	Wichita, Kansas	Advantage	1	0
22	Phoenix, Arizona	Racquets, Sunsets	0	2
22	San Francisco, California	Golden Gaters	0	2
24	Austin, Texas	Aces	0	1
24	Boise, Idaho	Sneakers	0	1
24	Boston, Massachusetts	Lobsters	0	1
24	Long Beach, California	Breakers	0	1
24	Raleigh, North Carolina	Edge	0	1

== See also ==
- U.S. intercollegiate team tennis champions
