= Team tennis =

Team racquet sport

Team tennis is a tennis tournament consisting of matches between different groups of players, each competing to win the tournament for their team. The format is usually a modified version of the professionally played World TeamTennis format, consisting of both men's and women's matches with singles, doubles, and mixed doubles.

== By country ==
It is played at the collegiate or national level in the United States. The United States Tennis Association promotes junior team tennis and USTA League Tennis. The National Collegiate Athletic Association organizes competitions such as the NCAA Division I Men's Tennis Championship and NCAA Division I Women's Tennis Championship. Many regions have their own "city-based" or "area-based" for example, the CASHS tennis team teams (often backed by a professional player) with a National Championship in the US.

In the United Kingdom, team tennis is played through schools and clubs from local to national levels. The Lawn Tennis Association run the 'AEGON Team Tennis Series' where several thousand of teams compete.

== List of adult team tennis tournaments ==
Active

- Davis Cup – men's national teams
- Billie Jean King Cup – women's national teams
- United Cup – mixed national teams
- Laver Cup – men's Team Europe vs Team World
- Hopman Cup – mixed national teams

Abolished

- International Premier Tennis League – mixed Asia-Pacific franchises
- Champions Tennis League – mixed Indian franchises
- Odisha Tennis Premier League – mixed Indian franchises
- World TeamTennis – mixed North American franchises
- ATP Cup - men's national teams
- Wightman Cup – women's United States vs Great Britain
- World Team Cup – men's national teams

== See also ==
- World TeamTennis is a different organization and playing format; formulated by Billie Jean King
