= 1974 New York Sets season =

- Section: 4th Atlantic

Record
- 1974 record: 15 wins, 29 losses
- Home record: 9 wins, 13 losses
- Road record: 6 wins, 16 losses
- Games won–lost: 1,027–1,163

Team info
- Owner(s): Sol Berg
- President/CEO: Sol Berg
- Coach: Manuel Santana
- Stadium: Nassau Veterans Memorial Coliseum
- Average attendance: 2,869 (63,121 total)

The 1974 New York Sets season was the inaugural season for the franchise in World Team Tennis (WTT). The team had 15 wins and 29 losses and finished in last place in the Atlantic Section.

== Season Recap ==
The Sets were founded as a charter franchise in World Team Tennis by Jerry Saperstein, son of Harlem Globetrotters founder Abe Saperstein. During the inaugural season, Saperstein sold the team to New York businessman Sol Berg.

On May 7, 1974, the Sets played their inaugural match on their home court at the Nassau Veterans Memorial Coliseum in the hamlet of Uniondale in the town of Hempstead, New York against the Hawaii Leis. The Sets drew 4,999 fans for their opening match. Under rules used only during the first few weeks of the season, the match comprised two sets of women's singles, two sets of men's singles and two sets of mixed doubles. No men's or women's doubles were played. WTT changed the match format on May 18, 1974, to one set each of men's singles, women's singles, men's doubles, women's doubles and mixed doubles. Pam Teeguarden lost the opening set of women's singles for the Sets, 6–4, to Valerie Ziegenfuss. The Leis went on to win four of the six sets and take the match, 29–25.

After opening the season with two losses at home, the Sets got their first victory in franchise history on the road beating the Cleveland Nets, 31–30, on May 12. Following the win over the Nets, the Sets lost 10 straight matches to fall to 1–12. They followed this with five wins in the next six matches to improve to 6–13. From there, the Sets lost seven of the next 10 matches and fell to 9–20. After winning three out of five matches, the Sets lost three straight to drop to 12–25 and assured themselves of a losing season. A three-match winning streak, tying their longest of the season, brought the Sets to 15–25. However, the Sets finished the season by losing four straight and cemented their position in last place in the Atlantic Section.

== Match log ==
Legend
Sets Win	Sets Loss
Home team in CAPS

Match	Date	Result	Record
1	May 7	Hawaii Leis 29, NEW YORK SETS 25	0-1
2	May 9	Pittsburgh Triangles 28, NEW YORK SETS 23	0-2
3	May 12	New York Sets 31, CLEVELAND NETS 30	1-2
4	May 15	Toronto-Buffalo Royals 33, NEW YORK SETS 32	1-3
5	May 17	Boston Lobsters 31, NEW YORK SETS 28	1-4
6	May 20	Baltimore Banners 24, NEW YORK SETS 23	1-5
7	May 22	Minnesota Buckskins 25, NEW YORK SETS 17	1-6
8	May 24	Houston E-Z Riders 32, NEW YORK SETS 23	1-7
9	May 25	PHILADELPHIA FREEDOMS 30, New York Sets 16	1-8
10	May 28	Los Angeles Strings 30, NEW YORK SETS 20	1-9
11	May 29	DENVER RACQUETS 28, New York Sets 18	1-10
12	May 31	SAN FRANCISCO GOLDEN GATERS 27, New York Sets 19	1-11
13	June 1	LOS ANGELES STRINGS 29, New York Sets 25	1-12
14	June 3	NEW YORK SETS 27, Detroit Loves 26	2-12
15	June 5	NEW YORK SETS 24, Denver Racquets 21	3-12
16	June 8	BALTIMORE BANNERS 31, New York Sets 23	3-13
17	June 10	NEW YORK SETS 29, Baltimore Banners 27	4-13
18	June 13	NEW YORK SETS 26, Chicago Aces 23	5-13
19	June 15	New York Sets 24, BALTIMORE BANNERS 21	6-13
20	June 16	CLEVELAND NETS 31, New York Sets 17	6-14
21	July 7	BOSTON LOBSTERS 25, New York Sets 21	6-15
22	July 8	New York Sets 28, DETROIT LOVES 27	7-15
23	July 9	Cleveland Nets 32, NEW YORK SETS 19	7-16
24	July 11	NEW YORK SETS 23, Toronto-Buffalo Royals 21	8-16
25	July 13	MINNESOTA BUCKSKINS 26, New York Sets 25	8-17
26	July 16	Boston Lobsters 22, NEW YORK SETS 18	8-18
27	July 18	NEW YORK SETS 28, Florida Flamingos 22	9-18
28	July 21	PITTSBURGH TRIANGLES 28, New York Sets 27	9-19
29	July 22	PHILADELPHIA FREEDOMS 30, New York Sets 10	9-20
30	July 23	NEW YORK SETS 26, San Francisco Golden Gaters 23	10-20
31	July 26	Philadelphia Freedoms 28, NEW YORK SETS 20	10-21
32	July 29	New York Sets 28, TORONTO-BUFFALO ROYALS 26	11-21
33	July 30	DETROIT LOVES 27, New York Sets 22	11-22
34	July 31	NEW YORK SETS 27, Cleveland Nets 25	12-22
35	August 1	HOUSTON E-Z RIDERS 30, New York Sets 19	12-23
36	August 2	CHICAGO ACES 25, New York Sets 20	12-24
37	August 4	HAWAII LEIS 22, New York Sets 21	12-25
38	August 7	NEW YORK SETS 29, Detroit Loves 24	13-25
39	August 10	New York Sets 28, FLORIDA FLAMINGOS 13	14-25
40	August 11	New York Sets 28, BOSTON LOBSTERS 22	15-25
41	August 12	TORONTO-BUFFALO ROYALS 27, New York Sets 25	15-26
42	August 13	Pittsburgh Triangles 25, NEW YORK SETS 22	15-27
43	August 16	Philadelphia Freedoms 25, NEW YORK SETS 24	15-28
44	August 18	PITTSBURGH TRIANGLES 32, New York Sets 19	15-29

== Team roster ==
- (Spain) Manuel Santana, Player-Coach
- (Uruguay) Fiorella Bonicelli
- (United States) Carole Caldwell Graebner
- (United States) Ceci Martinez
- (United States) Sandy Mayer
- (United States) Charlie Owens
- (Socialist Federal Republic of Yugoslavia) Niki Pilić
- (United States) Gene Scott
- (United States) Pam Teeguarden
- (United Kingdom) Virginia Wade
- (United States) Sharon Walsh

== See also ==
- New York Apples
- 1974 World Team Tennis season
- World TeamTennis
