= Boston Lobsters (1974) =

- Sport: Team tennis
- Founded: May 22, 1973
- Folded: February 1, 1975
- League: World TeamTennis
- Division: Eastern
- Based in: Boston, Massachusetts
- Stadium: Walter Brown Arena
- Colors: Orange-Red, Black, White
- Owner: Ray Ciccolo
- Head coach: Ion Țiriac
- General manager: John Korff
- Championships: None
- Division titles: None
- Playoff berths: None

The Boston Lobsters were a charter franchise of World Team Tennis (WTT) founded by Ray Ciccolo. The Lobsters played only one season before being contracted after the 1974 season, because the team was unable to meet its financial obligations to the league. The Lobsters had 19 wins and 25 losses, and finished in second place in the Atlantic Section missing the playoffs.

== Team history ==
The Lobsters were founded by Boston auto dealer Ray Ciccolo as a charter member of WTT in 1973. The team began play in WTT's inaugural 1974 season. The Lobsters played their home matches at the Walter Brown Arena where they averaged 2,564 paid fans per match for 22 home dates. Some of the Lobsters' matches were televised locally.

The first match in Lobsters' history was a 33–25 loss to the Philadelphia Freedoms at the Spectrum in Philadelphia. The Lobsters had a successful home debut the following night against the Hawaii Leis earning a 33–25 victory in front of a crowd of 3,574 at the Walter Brown Arena. The Lobsters started the season 7–7 in their first 14 matches. One of those seven losses was a forfeit of a road match against the Florida Flamingos. The Lobsters had a 20–18 lead in the match playing the final set of mixed doubles. With the score of the game tied 3–3, referee Kurt Wallach ruled that a Boston point would have to be replayed, because neither he nor the linesman saw the point made. The point would have given the Lobsters a 21–19 lead in the match. The Lobsters players complained and left the court. When they failed to return within 30 seconds, the referee awarded the game to the Flamingos, 4–3, cutting the Lobsters' lead in the match to 20–19. The referee gave the Lobsters 30 more seconds to return to the court and continue the set. After another 30 seconds had elapsed, the referee awarded the set and the match to the Flamingos with a final score of 20–20. The Lobsters were not permitted to play a match tiebreaker. The Lobsters filed an official protest with WTT over the referee's ruling. Lobsters' general manager John Korff said that the "situation of horrendous officiating cannot be tolerated." He added that low quality officiating "destroys the credibility of World Team Tennis and cannot be compared to any official sport." Lobsters' player-coach Ion Țiriac said, "Due to my participation in World Team Tennis, I have been banned from European tournaments, banned from playing Davis Cup and banned by my own Romanian Tennis Federation. I break my back for my team. We all fight together, and this is the kind of officiating we get. This is not tennis." WTT denied the Lobsters' protest.

A five-match winning streak put the Lobsters at 12–7 before losing their final match of the first half of the season as the league took a break in its schedule for Wimbledon.

Following the Wimbledon break, the Lobsters had two four-match losing streaks in July, and last eight of nine matches in that span to fall to 15–18. They won four of their next six to improve to 19–20, and the Lobsters remained in the hunt for the final playoff spot in the Eastern Division. However, the Lobsters lost their final five matches of the season to finish with 19 wins and 25 losses, second place in the Atlantic Section and 2 matches behind the final Eastern Division playoff spot.

Following the 1974 season, it was reported that Ciccolo had lost about $300,000 operating the Lobsters. In early 1975, he was forced to declare bankruptcy. At the WTT owners meeting on February 1, 1975, each team was required to post a $500,000 letter of credit. Since the Lobsters failed to do so the team was contracted by WTT. A dispersal draft was conducted to distribute the players among the remaining teams in the league.

Weeks later, a group of investors that included Bob Mades, Paul Slater, Herbert S. Hoffman, Robert K. Kraft and Harold Bayne emerged as a potential owner for a WTT franchise in Boston. However, the Lobsters had already been contracted. The group purchased the Philadelphia Freedoms on March 27, moved the team to Boston. In order to claim the name of the original Lobsters, the new ownership group would be required to settle some of the debts of the former team. The new owners decided to do this and renamed the team the Boston Lobsters. In promotional materials and media guides for 1975 onward, the new Lobsters management presented the team as a continuation of this 1974 team and ignored any history the franchise had in Philadelphia, since they had paid for the right to do so by settling debts of the original Lobsters.

== 1974 match log ==
Legend
| Lobsters Win | Lobsters Loss |
Home team in CAPS

| Match | Date | Result | Attendance (Home Only) | Record |
|---|---|---|---|---|
| 1 | May 8 | PHILADELPHIA FREEDOMS 33, Boston Lobsters 25 | | 0–1 |
| 2 | May 9 | BOSTON LOBSTERS 33, Hawaii Leis 25 | 3,574 | 1–1 |
| 3 | May 12 | Detroit Loves 29, BOSTON LOBSTERS 24 | 2,149 | 1–2 |
| 4 | May 14 | DETROIT LOVES 33, Boston Lobsters 22 | | 1–3 |
| 5 | May 15 | BOSTON LOBSTERS 31, Pittsburgh Triangles 22 | 2,129 | 2–3 |
| 6 | May 16 | Boston Lobsters 37, TORONTO-BUFFALO ROYALS 22 | | 3–3 |
| 7 | May 17 | Boston Lobsters 31, NEW YORK SETS 28 | | 4–3 |
| 8 | May 21 | Baltimore Banners 27, BOSTON LOBSTERS 22 | 2,201 | 4–4 |
| 9 | May 23 | BOSTON LOBSTERS 25, Minnesota Buckskins 24 | 1,365 | 5–4 |
| 10 | May 25 | BOSTON LOBSTERS 25, Chicago Aces 16 | 2,243 | 6–4 |
| 11 | May 29 | FLORIDA FLAMINGOS 20, Boston Lobsters 20, forfeit | | 6–5 |
| 12 | May 30 | Cleveland Nets 29, BOSTON LOBSTERS 25 | 2,318 | 6–6 |
| 13 | June 2 | BOSTON LOBSTERS 28, Toronto-Buffalo Royals 27 | 1,718 | 7–6 |
| 14 | June 4 | Pittsburgh Triangles 31, BOSTON LOBSTERS 18 | 1,941 | 7–7 |
| 15 | June 6 | BOSTON LOBSTERS 28, Detroit Loves 27 | 2,154 | 8–7 |
| 16 | June 9 | BOSTON LOBSTERS 25, Baltimore Banners 22 | 2,108 | 9–7 |
| 17 | June 10 | Boston Lobsters 30, TORONTO-BUFFALO ROYALS 18 | | 10–7 |
| 18 | June 11 | Boston Lobsters 23, CHICAGO ACES 22 | | 11–7 |
| 19 | June 13 | BOSTON LOBSTERS 30, San Francisco Golden Gaters 18 | 2,328 | 12–7 |
| 20 | June 16 | Philadelphia Freedoms 33, BOSTON LOBSTERS 24 | 4,116 | 12–8 |
| 21 | July 6 | CLEVELAND NETS 22, Boston Lobsters 19 | | 12–9 |
| 22 | July 7 | BOSTON LOBSTERS 25, New York Sets 21 | 2,421 | 13–9 |
| 23 | July 9 | PITTSBURGH TRIANGLES 29, Boston Lobsters 27 | | 13–10 |
| 24 | July 10 | Boston Lobsters 28, MINNESOTA BUCKSKINS 16 | | 14–10 |
| 25 | July 11 | DENVER RACQUETS 25, Boston Lobsters 19 | | 14–11 |
| 26 | July 16 | Toronto-Buffalo Royals 28, BOSTON LOBSTERS 24 | 2,341 | 14–12 |
| 27 | July 16 | NEW YORK SETS 22, Boston Lobsters 18 | | 14–13 |
| 28 | July 19 | SAN FRANCISCO GOLDEN GATERS 28, Boston Lobsters 25 | | 14–14 |
| 29 | July 20 | Boston Lobsters 24, LOS ANGELES STRINGS 20 | | 15–14 |
| 30 | July 22 | HAWAII LEIS 23, Boston Lobsters 22 | | 15–15 |
| 31 | July 24 | HOUSTON E-Z RIDERS 30, Boston Lobsters 19 | | 15–16 |
| 32 | July 26 | BALTIMORE BANNERS 29, Boston Lobsters 20 | | 15–17 |
| 33 | July 28 | Philadelphia Freedoms 24, BOSTON LOBSTERS 21 | 4,116 | 15–18 |
| 34 | July 30 | BOSTON LOBSTERS 23, Los Angeles Strings 18 | 3,034 | 16–18 |
| 35 | August 1 | BOSTON LOBSTERS 25, Cleveland Nets 22 | 3,126 | 17–18 |
| 36 | August 3 | CLEVELAND NETS 30, Boston Lobsters 21 | | 17–19 |
| 37 | August 4 | Denver Racquets 27, BOSTON LOBSTERS 21 | 2,244 | 17–20 |
| 38 | August 7 | Boston Lobsters 23, BALTIMORE BANNERS 21 | | 18–20 |
| 39 | August 8 | BOSTON LOBSTERS 26, Florida Flamingos 21 | 2,647 | 19–20 |
| 40 | August 10 | PITTSBURGH TRIANGLES 30, Boston Lobsters 11 | | 19–21 |
| 41 | August 11 | New York Sets 28, BOSTON LOBSTERS 22 | 2,464 | 19–22 |
| 42 | August 12 | PHILADELPHIA FREEDOMS 29, Boston Lobsters 23 | | 19–23 |
| 43 | August 15 | Houston E-Z Riders 31, BOSTON LOBSTERS 25 | 3,676 | 19–24 |
| 44 | August 16 | DETROIT LOVES 31, Boston Lobsters 18 | | 19–25 |

=== Summary ===
- Home record: 12 wins, 10 losses
- Road record: 7 wins, 15 losses
- Games won: 1,055
- Games lost: 1,111
- Total attendance: 56,413
- Average attendance: 2,564

== See also ==
- World TeamTennis
- 1974 World Team Tennis season
- Boston Lobsters (1974–1978)
- Boston Lobsters
