= Boston Lobsters (1974–1978) =

Team tennis franchise (1974–1978)

- Sport: Team tennis
- Founded: 1973
- Folded: October 27, 1978
- League: World TeamTennis
- Division: Eastern
- Team history: Philadelphia Freedoms; 1974; Boston Lobsters; 1975–1978
- Based in: Boston
- Stadium: Walter Brown Arena
- Colors: Orange-red, white
- Owner: Robert K. Kraft; Paul Slater; Bob Mades; Herbert S. Hoffman; Harold Bayne
- President: Robert K. Kraft
- Head coach: Roy Emerson
- General manager: J. W. Wilson
- Championships: None
- Division titles: 1974 (as Philadelphia Freedoms); 1978 (as Boston Lobsters)
- Playoff berths: 1974 (as Philadelphia Freedoms); 1975, 1977, 1978 (as Boston Lobsters)

The Boston Lobsters were a charter franchise of World Team Tennis (WTT) founded by Dick and Ken Butera as the Philadelphia Freedoms. The Freedoms played only one season in Philadelphia before being sold on March 27, 1975, moving to Boston and changing their name to the Lobsters. Following the 1978 season, Lobsters owner Robert Kraft announced that the franchise would fold.

== Team history ==
=== Inaugural season ===
The Philadelphia Freedoms were founded by Dick and Ken Butera as a charter member of WTT in 1973. The team began play in WTT's inaugural 1974 season. The Freedoms played their home matches at the Spectrum. The centerpiece of the team was tennis legend Billie Jean King who served as its player-coach. King became the first woman to coach a professional sports team that included male players.

Once King was signed on with the Freedoms, her good friend Elton John decided to write and record the song "Philadelphia Freedom" to wish her luck on her new venture with WTT and for the team to use as an anthem. John was such a big fan of the Freedoms that he attended home matches wearing the team's uniform and sat on the bench with the players. Although recorded in the summer of 1974, the song was not released until February 24, 1975, after the Freedoms had already played their final match in Philadelphia.

King heavily recruited then 17-year-old amateur Betsy Nagelsen to sign with the Freedoms. Although Nagelsen has often been listed as a member of the team, including by its 21st century namesake, this is untrue. Nagelsen was not listed on the roster in the game program for the Freedoms' match against the Baltimore Banners on May 17, 1974. After working under King's tutelage for three weeks during the summer of 1974, Nagelsen lost to her in straight sets in the third round of the 1974 US Open. After the match, Nagelsen said she hoped to play with King on the Freedoms in 1975. On the same date the Freedoms were playing in the Match 2 of the WTT Finals, Nagelsen was playing in the final of the Virginia Slims of Newport in what was her first professional tournament.

King's performance on the court earned her the WTT Most Valuable Player Award as she led the Freedoms to 39 wins and 5 losses, first place in the Atlantic Section and the best regular-season record in WTT.

WTT playoff series in the division semifinals and division championship series in 1974, were played over two legs, one match on the home court of each team. The team with the best aggregate score over the two matches was the winner. As the higher seed, the Freedoms had the choice to play either the first or the second match at home. The Freedoms met the Cleveland Nets in the Eastern Division Semifinals and won both matches, 26–22 in Cleveland and 23–22 at home. The Freedoms clinched the series when Fred Stolle playing mixed doubles in the fifth set served an ace on match point in the second match.

The victory over the Nets advanced the Freedoms to the Eastern Division Championship Series against the Pittsburgh Triangles. Again, the Freedoms chose to open on the road and won the first match, 31–21, in Pittsburgh and then lost the second, 24–21, at home. By an aggregate score of 52–45, the Freedoms won the Eastern Division Championship and advanced to the WTT Finals.

In the WTT Finals, the Freedoms met the Denver Racquets. The Racquets swept the best-of-three series, winning 27–21 in Denver and 28–24 in Philadelphia, to win the title and end the Freedoms' season.

At the 1974 WTT draft, player-coach King made the selections for the Freedoms. In the seventh round, she chose Bobby Riggs, against whom she had won the Battle of the Sexes 14 months earlier. In announcing the selection, King said, "We haven't made up our mind in which division we'll play him." The following day, Riggs was quoted as saying, "It sounds like a great idea, but is the money right?" He added that he didn't know how King "plans to use me—as a mixed doubles partner or as a ladies' doubles partner." Since they had been unable to sign her after selecting her in the 1973 draft, the Freedoms also chose Nagelsen in order to protect their rights to her. The Freedoms had previously rejected an offer from the Houston E-Z Riders who sought to acquire Nagelsen in a trade. Many WTT teams selected celebrities such as Johnny Carson and Bill Cosby at the 1974 draft. The Freedoms' colorful draft choice was Elton John.

Following the 1974 season, WTT owners were looking to develop a plan for growth of the league. Many were of the opinion that it would be in all their interests to have a successful franchise in New York City. With some encouragement from his fellow owners, Dick Butera traded King to the New York Sets in a complicated deal. Upon announcing the trade, Butera said, "It not an easy thing to let Billie Jean go. I feel like King Faisal giving away his oil wells."

After King was traded, a group of investors that included Bob Mades, a Somerville, Massachusetts meat-packing executive who lived in Belmont, Massachusetts, Paul Slater, a Newton, Massachusetts realtor, Herbert S. Hoffman, a Boston jeans distributor who had been a part owner of the recently contracted Hartford Royals, Robert K. Kraft, a forest products company executive, and Harold Bayne, a Boston meat-packing executive, expressed interest in buying the original Boston Lobsters. However, the Lobsters had already been contracted by WTT. With the Buteras far less enthusiastic about their team after trading King, the two sides struck a deal, and the group purchased the Freedoms on March 27, 1975, and moved the team to Boston. In order to claim the name of the original Lobsters, the new ownership group would be required to settle some of the debts of the former team. The new owners decided to do this and renamed the team the Boston Lobsters.

Mades was named president of the team, and Slater was named chairman of the board.

=== First season in Boston ===
In 1975, the reincarnated Lobsters presented themselves as a continuation of the original Lobsters that folded after the 1974 season in promotional materials and media guides, since they had paid for that privilege. The team ignored any connection with its actual history as the Freedoms. The Lobsters also adopted the team logo of the original Lobsters.

The Lobsters played a 46-match WTT regular-season schedule in 1975. They had 15 home matches, 15 road matches and 16 neutral-site matches. The league used neutral-site matches to cut down on travel and create events where fans could see multiple teams either with one admission or over the course of a few days. These special events were called WTT Spectaculars. Because of these and because of scheduling challenges created when the Houston E-Z Riders suspended operations just days before the season started, the 10 teams in the league did not play an equal number of matches. Seven of them played 44 matches, while the Lobsters, Hawaii Leis and San Diego Friars each played 46 matches. Of the Lobsters' 15 home matches, 11 were played at the Walter Brown Arena in Boston, three were played at the Providence Civic Center in Providence, Rhode Island and one was played at the brand-new Hartford Civic Center in Hartford, Connecticut.

When the Lobsters played their 1975 home opener in Boston on May 22, against the New York Sets, they were already 0–7, having lost three road matches and four neutral-site matches. The Lobsters were dominated, 25–12, by the Sets who were led by Billie Jean King (whom the franchise had traded to the Sets a few months before) and fell to 0–8. The season opener drew 2,191 fans to the Walter Brown Arena. The following day, the Lobsters played two home matches in Providence. They won the first, 27–17, against the Indiana Loves and lost the second, 27–21, to the Sets as WTT made its debut in Providence in front of 4,317 fans, the largest home crowd the Lobsters would draw all season. The Lobsters continued to struggle and lost their final three matches before WTT took a break for Wimbledon to fall to 6–18.

The Lobsters won their first match after the Wimbledon break, 29–25, over the Los Angeles Strings, their first win in Boston all season. A neutral-site loss in Los Angeles to the Cleveland Nets on July 14, dropped the Lobsters' record to 7–21. However, after that match, the Lobsters won four straight, seven of their next eight, and nine of their next 11 matches to improve their record to 16–23. A 28–23 victory over the Leis in Hartford in front of 2,492 fans improved the Lobsters' record to 17–24. The Lobsters followed that victory with three more wins in their next four matches which clinched them a playoff berth. The Lobsters finished the regular season with 20 wins and 26 losses, third in the Eastern Division.

Greer Stevens was a key to the Lobsters' late-season success leading them to the playoffs. She was named WTT Female Rookie of the Year, and she also won the Female All-Star Match Most Valuable Player Award.

The Lobsters met the New York Sets on the road in the Eastern Division Semifinal Match. The Lobsters had lost all six of their regular-season matches with the Sets. However, the Lobsters squeezed out an upset victory in a tightly played match, 25–24, to advance to the Eastern Division Championship Series against the Pittsburgh Triangles.

The Lobsters hosted the first match of the Eastern Division Championship Series in front of only 912 fans in Boston and lost, 25–16. The Triangles took the second match in Pittsburgh, 23–14, to end the Lobsters' season.

=== A last-place finish ===
All WTT teams returned to a 44-match regular season schedule in 1976, with 22 home and 22 road matches. The Lobsters played 18 of their home matches at the Walter Brown Arena and four at the Hartford Civic Center. The Lobsters' August 9 road match against the New York Sets was cancelled due to Hurricane Belle and not made up. The Lobsters started the 1976 season with three straight losses but rebounded and stood at 5–5 after 10 matches. From there, the Lobsters lost 11 of their next 15 matches and fell to 9–16. They had 9 wins and 9 losses in their final 18 matches, but it wasn't enough to avoid a last-place finish in the Eastern Division with 18 wins and 25 losses.

=== Changes lead to success ===
The Lobsters acquired 20-year-old Martina Navratilova in a trade with the Cleveland-Pittsburgh Nets for Wendy Turnbull prior to the 1977 season. They also added Roy Emerson as a player-coach. Navratilova led WTT in game-winning percentage in women's singles and won 32 of the 39 sets she played. She also teamed with Greer Stevens to lead WTT in game-winning percentage in women's doubles. The Lobsters' Tony Roche was third in game-winning percentage in men's singles.

The Lobsters played 16 of their 22 home matches in 1977 at the Walter Brown Arena and the other six at the Hartford Civic Center. They raced out of the blocks starting 3–0 and extending their record to 8–1, 14–2, and 17–3 after 20 matches. The Lobsters played in front of four sellout crowd of 4,103 at the Walter Brown Arena. They finished the regular season first in the Eastern Division with 35 wins and 9 losses.

The Lobsters met the Cleveland-Pittsburgh Nets in the Eastern Division Semifinals. The Lobsters won the first match in Boston, 30–26. However, the Nets took the second match in Cleveland, 21–20, to force a deciding third match in Boston. The Lobsters won the third match, 28–21, to advance to the Eastern Division Championship Series against the defending WTT Champion New York Apples.

Having played the previous three consecutive days, the Lobsters opened their series with the Apples in Boston with a 29–21 loss. Two days later, the Lobsters fell again to the Apples in New York, 29–26, and saw their season come to an end.

=== Final season, division championship ===
In 1978, the Lobsters again played 16 of their 22 home matches at the Walter Brown Arena. Four home matches were played at Cape Cod Coliseum in South Yarmouth, Massachusetts. One home match was played at the Providence Civic Center, and the other was played at the George F. Kneller Athletic Center on the campus of Clark University in Worcester, Massachusetts. Five of the Lobsters' matches were televised locally on WSBK-TV Channel 38.

Martina Navratilova was named WTT Female Most Valuable Player and led the Lobsters to the Eastern Division Championship with 33 wins and 11 losses, the best regular-season record in the league. It was the team's second consecutive first-place finish. The Lobsters defeated the New Orleans Nets in the WTT Quarterfinals and the Seattle Cascades in the WTT Semifinals setting up a best-of-five WTT Finals against the Los Angeles Strings.

The Strings took the first two matches of the finals, 24–21 and 30–20, in Boston before the Lobsters won the third match, 27–26, in a super tiebreaker on the road. Martina Navratilova started the finals on the sidelines with a shoulder injury. Ultimately, she needed surgery to have calcium deposits removed from her shoulder. Anne Smith replaced her playing singles for the Lobsters in the first two matches. Navratilova returned in the third match and contributed a women's singles set win against Chris Evert, 7–5. Smith and Tony Roche teamed for a 6–2 mixed doubles set win in the final set that erased the Strings' 24–20 lead and sent the match to the super tiebreaker. After falling behind, 5–4, Smith and Roche won three straight points to take the super tiebreaker, 7–5. In the tightly contested fourth match at The Forum in Inglewood, California, Ilie Năstase and Evert of the Strings both won sets in tiebreakers against Roche and Navratilova in men's and women's singles, respectively. The Lobsters opened the match with a men's doubles set win by Roy Emerson and Dale Collings, 6–4, over brothers Vijay and Ashok Amritraj. After the men's singles, Smith and Roche took the mixed doubles set, 6–4, over Ann Kiyomura and Năstase to give the Lobsters an 18–15 lead. Following the women's singles, the Lobsters took a 24–22 lead to the final set. But Evert and Kiyomura dominated Navratilova and Smith, 6–1, in women's doubles to give the Strings a 28–25 victory and the WTT Championship.

On October 27, 1978, Robert Kraft announced that the Lobsters were folding. The WTT suspended operations in March 1979, and no 1979 season was played.

== Season-by-season records ==
The following table shows regular season records, playoff results and titles won by the Boston Lobsters franchise since its founding in 1974, including its inaugural season as the Philadelphia Freedoms.

Year	Team Name	W	L	PCT	Playoff result	Titles won
1974	Philadelphia Freedoms	39	5	.886	Won Eastern Division Semifinals; Won Eastern Division Championship Series; Lost in WTT Finals	Eastern Division Champions; Atlantic Section Champions; Best regular-season record in WTT
1975	Boston Lobsters	20	26	.435	Won Eastern Division Semifinal Match; Lost in Eastern Division Championship Series	
1976	Boston Lobsters	18	25	.419	Missed playoffs	
1977	Boston Lobsters	35	9	.795	Won Eastern Division Semifinals; Lost in Eastern Division Championship Series	
1978	Boston Lobsters	33	11	.750	Won WTT Quarterfinals; Won WTT Semifinals; Lost in WTT Finals	Eastern Division Champions; Best regular-season record in WTT
Subtotals	Philadelphia Freedoms	39	5	.886	WTT Finals: 0 wins, 1 loss, .000; All Playoff Series: 2 wins, 1 loss, .667	WTT Champions - 0 Eastern Division Champions - 1 (1974); Atlantic Section Champions - 1 (1974); Best regular-season record in WTT - 1 (1974)
Subtotals	Boston Lobsters	106	71	.599	WTT Finals: 0 wins, 1 loss, .000; All Playoff Series: 4 wins, 3 losses, .571	WTT Champions - 0 Eastern Division Champions - 1 (1977); Best regular-season record in WTT - 1 (1978)
Grand; Totals		145	76	.656	WTT Finals: 0 wins, 2 losses, .000; All Playoff Series: 6 wins, 4 losses, .600	WTT Champions - 0 Eastern Division Champions - 2 (1974, 1978); Atlantic Section Champions - 1 (1974); Best regular-season record in WTT - 1 (1974, 1978)

== Home courts ==
The following table shows home courts used by the Boston Lobsters franchise since its founding in 1974, including its inaugural season as the Philadelphia Freedoms.

Venue	Location	Duration		Notes
Venue	Location	Start	End	Notes
The Spectrum	Philadelphia	1974	1974	Primary home venue
Walter Brown Arena	Boston	1975	1978	Primary home venue
Providence Civic Center	Providence, Rhode Island	1975	1975	Alternate home venue
Hartford Civic Center	Hartford, Connecticut	1975	1977	Alternate home venue
Cape Cod Coliseum	South Yarmouth, Massachusetts	1978	1978	Alternate home venue
Providence Civic Center	Providence, Rhode Island	1978	1978	Alternate home venue
George F. Kneller Athletic Center	Worcester, Massachusetts	1978	1978	Alternate home venue

== Individual honors ==
The following table shows individual honors bestowed upon players and coaches of the Boston Lobsters franchise since its founding in 1974, including its inaugural season as the Philadelphia Freedoms.

Year	Player/Coach	Award
1974	Billie Jean King	Most Valuable Player
1975	Greer Stevens	Female All-Star Match Most Valuable Player
1975	Greer Stevens	Female Rookie of the Year
1978	Martina Navratilova	Female Most Valuable Player

== Hall of Fame players ==
The following players who are enshrined in the International Tennis Hall of Fame played for the Boston Lobsters franchise since its founding in 1974, including its inaugural season as the Philadelphia Freedoms:

- Roy Emerson
- Billie Jean King
- Martina Navratilova
- Tony Roche
- Fred Stolle

== Final roster ==
The Boston Lobsters' roster for their final season in 1978 was

- (Australia) Roy Emerson, Player-Coach
- (Australia) Dale Collings
- (United States) Mike Estep
- (United States) Terry Ann Holladay
- (United States) Una Keyes
- (United States) Martina Navratilova
- (Australia) Tony Roche
- (United States) Anne Smith
- (South Africa) Greer Stevens

== See also ==
- World TeamTennis
- Philadelphia Freedoms (1974)
- Boston Lobsters (1974)
- Boston Lobsters
