= San Francisco Golden Gaters =

World Table Tennis charter franchise

- Sport: Team tennis
- Founded: May 22, 1973
- Folded: March 1979
- League: World TeamTennis
- Division: Western
- Team history: San Francisco Golden Gaters; 1974–1978
- Based in: Oakland, California
- Stadium: Oakland–Alameda County Coliseum Arena
- Colors: Purple, Orange
- Owner: Dave Peterson; Larry King; Cathie Anderson; Jerry Diamond
- President: Dave Peterson
- Head coach: Frew McMillan
- General manager: Bob Horowitz
- Championships: None
- Division titles: 1975, 1976
- Playoff berths: 1974, 1975, 1976, 1977, 1978

The San Francisco Golden Gaters were a charter franchise of World Team Tennis (WTT). The Golden Gaters won two Western Division Championships and lost in the WTT Finals both times. The team was founded in 1973 and made the playoffs in each of the five seasons in which it participated in the league. Following the 1978 season, eight of the then 10 WTT franchises folded leaving only the Golden Gaters and the Phoenix Racquets prepared to participate in the 1979 season. WTT suspended operations of the league in March 1979, ending the Golden Gaters existence.

== Team history ==
=== Founding and inaugural season ===
San Francisco Golden Gaters logo used from 1974 to 1977.

The Golden Gaters were founded as WTT's charter franchise for San Francisco, California in 1973, by former tennis player Cathie Anderson and attorney Larry King, then the husband of tennis superstar Billie Jean King. Anderson was the team's first president. The team played its home matches at the Oakland–Alameda County Coliseum Arena in Oakland, California starting with the league's inaugural season in 1974 season. While the team was founded as a San Francisco franchise, it ended up playing its home matches across the San Francisco Bay in Oakland. The Golden Gaters' management sought to cultivate a San Francisco rather than an Oakland image for the team, and it did not put "Oakland" in front of its name. Nevertheless, the team did not want to alienate East Bay fans by using San Francisco as part of its name. The first name the franchise used was the Golden Gate Otters before settling on simply calling itself the Golden Gaters in its dealings with the general public. Since it would have been absurd to call the team the Golden Gate Golden Gaters, and the league used a location to identify all its teams, WTT reverted to using San Francisco, the location for which the original charter was issued, when referring to the team. They were listed in official WTT standings as the San Francisco Golden Gaters.

Jerry Diamond was hired as the Golden Gaters' general manager. Later in 1974, he would also become the first executive director of the newly formed Women's Tennis Association, a position he would hold for 11 years overseeing significant growth in the women's tour. The Golden Gaters opened their inaugural season with Frew McMillan as their player-coach and also featured Roy Emerson, Dick Bohrnstedt, Lesley Hunt, 18-year-old Ilana Kloss and Barbara Downs. Margaret Court was also on the team, but she did not play, because she was pregnant. Kloss would later go on to become WTT commissioner in 2001. With their 20th and final selection in the WTT's inaugural draft, the Golden Gaters (then still known as the Otters) selected co-owner and president Anderson who made the selection herself. She did not end up playing in WTT.

The Golden Gaters' inaugural match was a 35–26 victory at home over the Denver Racquets on May 8, 1974. Hunt split her two sets of women's singles but won 10 games and lost 7 against her opponents. Emerson won both of his men's singles sets over Andrew Pattison, 7–5 and 6–2. Kloss and McMillan played both mixed doubles set for the Golden Gaters and split them winning 12 games and losing 12. The Golden Gaters drew 4,012 fans for their opener at the Oakland–Alameda County Coliseum Arena. Across the parking lot, the defending two-time World Champion Oakland Athletics were playing the Baltimore Orioles at the Oakland–Alameda County Coliseum and drew only 2,980 fans in head-to-head competition with the Golden Gaters for the attention of sports fans.

The Golden Gaters clinched a playoff berth with a 29–20 victory at home against the Hawaii Leis on August 15. Hunt suffered an eye injury in the opening set of women's singles when a forehand volley ricocheted off her racket and hit her right eye. She played two more points before being replaced by Downs and taken to the hospital with the score of the game tied 1–1. Downs won the set against Brigitte Cuypers, 7–5. Denise Carter-Triolo substituted for Hunt in women' doubles and teamed with Ilana Kloss for a 6–2 set win over Ann Kiyomura and Valerie Ziegenfuss. Bohrnstedt dropped a men's singles set to his former USC Trojans teammate Mike Machette, 6–3. With the match already decided, McMillan didn't play mixed doubles which was won by Kloss and Whitney Reed over Barry McKay and Ziegenfuss, 7–5.

The Golden Gaters finished their inaugural season with 23 wins and 21 losses, second place in the Pacific Section and qualified for the Western Division Semifinals against the Denver Racquets.

WTT playoff series in 1974, were played over two legs, one match on the home court of each team. The team with the best aggregate score over the two matches was the winner. As the higher seed, the Racquets had the choice to play either the first or the second match at home. The Racquets won both matches against the Golden Gaters, 29–17 in Denver on August 19, and 32–24 in Oakland on August 20, to end the season for San Francisco.

=== A division championship ===
Following the 1974 season, Dave Peterson acquired a controlling interest in the Golden Gaters and became the team's president.

Just before the start of the 1975 season, the Golden Gaters traded Margaret Court with whom they were unable to reach an agreement on a contract to the Hawaii Leis for the rights to Chris Evert who had not expressed any interest in playing in WTT. Evert did not sign with the Golden Gaters.

The Golden Gaters added Tom Okker, Betty Stöve, 19-year-old Ann Kiyomura and Kate Latham. Kiyomura was from San Mateo, California, and Latham was from Palo Alto, California. Kiyomura had originally been selected by the Golden Gaters in WTT's inaugural draft but traded before the 1974 season to Hawaii for Dick Bohrnstedt and played for the Leis. The Golden Gaters also re-signed Whitney Reed and made him a player-assistant coach. Player-coach Frew McMillan teamed with Okker to lead WTT in game-winning percentage in men's doubles and with Stöve to lead in that category in mixed doubles. Okker's performance earned him the Male Most Valuable Player Award. McMillan was named WTT Coach of the Year.

The Golden Gaters raced to the top of the Western Division standings in 1975, with 29 wins and 15 losses. The first-place finish earned the Golden Gaters a bye in the Western Division Semifinals and set up a matchup with the Phoenix Racquets in the Western Division Championship Series.

Because the Oakland–Alameda County Coliseum Arena was booked by a circus in late August, the Golden Gaters 1975 home playoff matches were played at the Cow Palace in Daly City, California.

The Golden Gaters took the first match of the best-of-three series in Phoenix, Arizona, 25–24, on August 18. They returned home for their first-ever match at the Cow Palace on August 19, to complete the series sweep with a 26–20 victory which made the Golden Gaters Western Division Champions and sent them to the WTT Finals against the Pittsburgh Triangles who had WTT's best regular-season record in 1975. The Racquets led the second match, 18–17, after the first three sets, when Stöve came up with a dominant 6–1 set win over Françoise Dürr to give the Golden Gaters a 23–19 lead heading to the final set of mixed doubles which matched Stöve and McMillan against Kris Kemmer Shaw and Tony Roche. After holding in their first two service games, Stöve and McMillan broke Shaw's serve in the fourth game for a 3–1 lead in the set ending the match.

The Golden Gaters squeezed out a win in the opener of the best-of-three finals series at the Cow Palace, 26–25, on August 21. The Triangles won a tight second match in Pittsburgh on August 24, in front of 2,182 fans which set up a deciding third match. The win clearly inspired the Triangles' fans. On August 25, the Pittsburgh Civic Arena had 6,882 spectators walk through the turnstiles to see the Triangles dominate the rubber match, 21–14, and win the WTT title. Two sets in the deciding match were key to the Triangles' victory. Vitas Gerulaitis notched a 6–1 set win over Okker in men's singles, and Evonne Goolagong Cawley topped Stöve by the same score in women's singles.

=== Back to back division titles ===
On October 29, 1975, the Golden Gaters announced that they had traded the rights to negotiate with superstar Chris Evert to the Phoenix Racquets. Under the terms of the deal, the Racquets would send a player to be named later and undisclosed cash consideration to the Golden Gaters if they were able to sign Evert. If the Racquets failed to sign Evert before the 1976 season, the rights to her would revert to the Golden Gaters. The Golden Gaters had tried unsuccessfully to sign Evert after the 1975 season. When the trade was announced, Golden Gaters owner Dave Peterson said, "Chris indicated she had a strong preference for starting her World Team Tennis career in Phoenix. I feel her decision was greatly influenced by the fact that her closest friend, Kris Shaw, is on the Phoenix roster. We hated to make the deal. If it were just a matter of money we would have signed Chris, but money wasn't the major factor."

After signing Evert, the Racquets sent Françoise Dürr to the Golden Gaters to complete the deal. The Golden Gaters signed Dürr to a two-year contract. Dürr was an All-Star with the Racquets in 1975. Golden Gaters returning players Frew McMillian, Tom Okker and Betty Stöve were all All-Stars in 1975, as well. This made the Golden Gaters the only WTT team with four All-Stars from the previous season on their roster. Ilana Kloss announced just before the 1976 season that she was leaving the team in order to fully participate in clay-court tournaments in Europe which conflicted with the WTT schedule.

The signing of Dürr united her with Stöve with whom she had frequently and successfully partnered on the pro tournament circuit. Dürr said, "I’m very happy to be in San Francisco and with the Gaters." Then, looking in the direction of Stöve, she added, "I’m looking forward to playing doubles with Betty." When the Golden Gaters acquired Dürr, they also acquired her Airedale Terrier Topspin who served as her valet carrying her racquets. Topspin had a winning pedigree having served as the mascot of the 1974 WTT Champion Denver Racquets.

The Golden Gaters reached a deal with KTVU-TV Channel 2 to broadcast four of the team's road matches live in the San Francisco Bay Area.

For the 1976 season, the Golden Gaters added Jeff Borowiak and Raquel Giscafré. For the second time, Ann Kiyomura was shipped away, this time to the Indiana Loves. With the Loves, she teamed up with Ray Ruffels to lead WTT in game-winning percentage in mixed doubles in 1976. Two-sport star John Lucas was signed by the Golden Gaters during the season.

Controversy arose before the start of the 1976 season when Golden Gaters co-owner Larry King acting in his capacity as WTT president changed the date of a match between the Pittsburgh Triangles and Boston Lobsters from May 8 to May 16, to free up Evonne Goolagong for a promotional event. Triangles owner Frank Fuhrer protested the change and called for a vote of the owners to overrule the decision. The Golden Gaters abstained from voting. The Lobsters, who were hosting the match in question, voted to accept the schedule change. However, Fuhrer got six other owners to side with him to overrule King's decision. Later, the sponsor of the promotional event appealed to Fuhrer personally and bought $10,000 worth of tickets to two Triangles matches resulting in Fuhrer accepting the schedule change. The conflicts of interest that were pervasive throughout WTT clearly caused dissent among some owners. Fuhrer was quoted as saying, "We're the defending champs, and I'm not having Larry King change my schedule on me to accommodate his own interests. We're going to get all the conflict of interest out of this league."

On June 28, 1976, the Golden Gaters claimed the negotiating rights to ten reigning French Open champion Adriano Panatta after he had been left unprotected by the New York Sets. Golden Gaters did not contact Panatta about a contract but did inform him that they had obtained his rights. "Should the time arise in the near future when the Gaters need some strength in the men's category," said Golden Gaters owner Dave Peterson, "I will not hesitate to sit down with Adriano and discuss financial terms. But, until that time comes, I am totally pleased with our present lineup and look at the Panatta acquisition as a strengthening to the Gater franchise."

During the 1976 season, Tom Okker earned the Male All-Star Match Most Valuable Player Award. The Golden Gaters finished the 1976 regular season with 28 wins and 16 losses, second place in the Western Division, 2 matches behind the Phoenix Racquets whom they met in the Western Division Championship Series. McMillan and Okker led WTT in game-winning percentage in men's doubles, and Dürr and Stöve were the leaders in women's doubles.

On August 16, the Golden Gaters opened the playoffs on the road in front of 5,848 fans at Arizona Veterans Memorial Coliseum with a dominant victory over the Racquets. Okker and Frew McMillian opened the match with a 6–2 set win over Andrew Pattison and player-coach Tony Roche. Stöve followed with a stunning 7–6 set win over reigning Wimbledon champion and WTT Female Most Valuable Player Evert to extend the Golden Gaters lead to 13–8. Stöve and Dürr then dominated Evert and Shaw, 6–0, in women's doubles pushing the Golden Gaters lead to 19–8. Okker won the men's singles against Pattison, 7–6, in a tiebreaker, and Dürr and Lucas took the final set from Shaw and Roche, 6–2, for a final score of 32–16. Stöve had lost all six women's singles matchups with Evert during the regular season.

The Golden Gaters returned home to Oakland for the second match with a chance to clinch the best-of-three series on August 17. McMillan and Dürr took the opening set of mixed doubles from Roche and Shaw, 6–3. Evert came back strong from her loss the previous night with a dominant 6–1 set win over Stöve to give the Racquets a 9–7 lead. The Golden Gaters surged back in front with a 6–1 set win by McMillan and Okker over Roche and Pattison to take a 13–10 lead. Pattison cut the lead to 18–17 with a 7–5 men's singles win over Okker. Dürr and Stöve dominated Evert and Shaw, 6–1, in women's singles for a 24–18 victory and the Golden Gaters' second consecutive Western Division Championship.

The Golden Gaters opened the best-of-five WTT Finals at home on August 20, against the New York Sets with a 31–23 overtime loss. The Sets took a 25–15 lead to the final set of women's doubles. Dürr and Stöve beat Virginia Wade and Billie Jean King, 7–5, to force overtime. Wade and King won the second game of overtime to seal the match. The Golden Gaters drew 5,120 fans for the second match in Oakland on August 23. Golden Gaters coach McMillan hoped to get the team off to a good start in the match by having his strong women's doubles team play first. However, Wade and King marched to a shockingly dominant 6–0 set win against Dürr and Stöve. Sandy Mayer won the first three games of men's singles against Okker to give the Sets a 9–0 lead. Mayer went on to win the set, 6–1, and give the Sets a 12–1 lead. The Golden Gaters picked up their play from there and even forced overtime. But the Sets cruised to a 29–21 victory. The Golden Gaters hit the road for the third match at Nassau Veterans Memorial Coliseum which was dominated by the Sets, 31–13 in front of 5,730 fans on August 27. Wade and Mayer both had dominant 6–1 victories in singles over Dürr and Okker, respectively. The Sets completed the series sweep by winning all five sets of the final match.

=== Departure of Stöve ===
In October 1976, Golden Gaters co-owner Larry King resigned as WTT president and became the interim president of the New York Sets, the team for which his wife Billie Jean played, furthering the conclusion that there were many conflicts of interest throughout the league.

Following the 1976 season, the Golden Gaters left Betty Stöve unprotected, and she was selected in the WTT draft by the Sea-Port Cascades. New WTT rules intended to create more competitive balance among the league's teams forced the Golden Gaters to leave one of their big stars unprotected. Frew McMillan, Tom Okker and Françoise Dürr all returned to the Golden Gaters for the 1977 season. The team added John and Terry Holladay and Betsy Nagelsen. The Golden Gaters also signed Henry Schneidman as an assistant coach.

The departure of Stöve presented challenges for the Golden Gaters. Nagelsen became Dürr's regular partner in women's doubles, and the pair won only 170 out of 382 games played (.445). Terry Holladay became the primary women's singles player and won only 189 out of 390 games played (.485). Areas that were strengths for the Golden Gaters in 1976, became weaknesses in 1977. For the third straight year, McMillan and Okker had WTT's highest game-winning percentage in men's doubles. Okker also had a winning record as the team's primary men's singles player.

The Golden Gaters finished 1977 with 25 wins and 19 losses, second place in the Western Division, 3 matches behind the Phoenix Racquets. McMillan was named WTT Male Most Valuable Player.

The Golden Gaters met the San Diego Friars in the Western Division Semifinals. The Friars won the first match in Oakland, 24–22, on August 16. The Friars completed the sweep in the second match in San Diego with a 24–21 victory on August 17. With the Golden Gaters leading, 20–18, after four sets, the Friars got a 6–1 set win from Rod Laver and Cliff Drysdale over Okker and McMillan in men's doubles to secure the victory.

=== Final season ===
By late 1977, Golden Gaters co-founder Larry King owned interests in the Golden Gaters, the New York Apples, the Pennsylvania Keystones (a proposed expansion franchise) and WTT Properties, the league's main marketing arm. After the 1977 season, Bob Horowitz became the Golden Gaters' new general manager replacing minority owner Jerry Diamond who remained with the team. Françoise Dürr was left unprotected in the 1978 WTT expansion draft, and she was selected by the Anaheim Oranges who later signed her.

For the 1978 season, the Golden Gaters changed the colors of their team logo and made minor alterations to the way the stings on the racquet included in the logo appear. The old colors were burnt umber and yellow. The new colors were purple and orange. Corresponding changes were made to the uniforms worn by the players and coaches. In a February 1978 trade that relieved the financially struggling Indiana Loves of the remainder of their obligation under the two-year $250,000 contract for Vitas Gerulaitis, the Golden Gaters acquired Gerulaitis for cash consideration and then sent him to the New York Apples in exchange for Sandy Mayer.

In March 1978, the Golden Gaters acquired Virginia Wade in a three-way trade with the Apples and the Seattle Cascades. Under the deal, Wade went from the Apples to the Golden Gaters, JoAnne Russell went from the Cascades to the Apples and Marita Redondo went from the Golden Gaters to the Cascades. Redondo did not play in WTT in 1977. After the 1977 season, she had been drafted by the Golden Gaters but not signed. Tom Okker did not return to WTT for the 1978 season. He played clay-court tournaments in Europe which conflict with the WTT schedule. Player-coach Frew McMillan was the only Golden Gaters returning player in 1978. In addition to newcomers Mayer and Wade, Ilana Kloss returned to the league and the team after a two-year absence, and the Golden Gaters signed Michael Wayman and Marise Kruger. In June, the Golden Gaters hired Tom Dietrich as assistant coach replacing Henry Schneidman who remained with the organization. Just before the start of the playoffs, the Golden Gaters signed Tom Leonard who was a regular member of the playoff lineup.

The Golden Gaters suffered through their first (and only) losing season in 1978, finishing with 21 wins and 23 losses, third place in the Western Division. They met the Los Angeles Strings in the WTT Quarterfinals. McMillan repeated as WTT Male Most Valuable Player. The first match of the best-of-three series was at the Forum in Inglewood, California on August 15. The Strings dominated the match, 29–17, winning four of the five sets. The only set won by the Golden Gaters was a 6–4 women's singles victory by Wade over Chris Evert. The Strings went on to win the series and end the Golden Gaters' season.

Following the 1978 season, eight of the 10 WTT franchises folded leaving only the Golden Gaters and the Racquets prepared to participate in the 1979 season. A few weeks after most of the franchises announced they were folding, WTT announced the creating of three new expansion franchises in Dallas, Los Angeles and San Diego and said that there would be five more expansion franchises chosen from a pool of candidates. WTT suspended operations of the league in March 1979, ending the Golden Gaters existence.

== Season-by-season records ==
The following table shows regular season records, playoff results and titles won by the San Francisco Golden Gaters.

Year	W	L	PCT	Playoff result	Titles won
1974	23	21	.523	Lost in Western Division Semifinals	
1975	29	15	.659	Won Western Division Championship Series; Lost in WTT Finals	Western Division Champions
1976	28	16	.636	Won Western Division Championship Series; Lost in WTT Finals	Western Division Champions
1977	25	19	.568	Lost in Western Division Semifinals	
1978	21	23	.477	Lost in WTT Quarterfinals	
Totals	126	94	.573	WTT Finals: 0 wins, 2 losses, .000; All Playoff Series: 2 wins, 5 losses, .286	WTT Champions - 0 Western Division Champions - 2 (1975, 1976)

== Home courts ==
The following table shows home courts used by the San Francisco Golden Gaters.

Venue	Location	Duration		Notes
Venue	Location	Start	End	Notes
Oakland–Alameda County Coliseum Arena	Oakland, California	1974	1978	Primary home venue
Cow Palace	Daly City, California	1975	1975	Alternate venue used for 1975 playoffs

== Individual honors ==
The following table shows individual honors bestowed upon players and coaches of the San Francisco Golden Gaters.

Year	Player/Coach	Award
1975	Tom Okker	Male Most Valuable Player
1975	Frew McMillan	Coach of the Year
1976	Tom Okker	Male All-Star Match Most Valuable Player
1977	Frew McMillan	Male Most Valuable Player
1978	Frew McMillan	Male Most Valuable Player

== Hall of Fame players ==
The following players who are enshrined in the International Tennis Hall of Fame played for the San Francisco Golden Gaters:

- Françoise Dürr
- Roy Emerson
- Frew McMillan
- Virginia Wade

== Final roster ==
The San Francisco Golden Gaters final roster for the 1978 season was

- (South Africa) Frew McMillan, Player-Coach
- (United States) Tom Dietrich, Assistant Coach
- (South Africa) Ilana Kloss
- (South Africa) Marise Kruger
- (United States) Tom Leonard
- (United States) Sandy Mayer
- (United Kingdom) Virginia Wade
- (United Kingdom) Michael Wayman

== See also ==
- World Team Tennis
