= Minnesota Buckskins =

- Sport: Team tennis
- Founded: May 22, 1973
- Folded: November 26, 1974
- League: World TeamTennis
- Division: Western
- Based in: Bloomington, Minnesota
- Stadium: Met Center
- Colors: English Violet, Golden Yellow
- Owner: Burt McGlynn
- President: Burt McGlynn
- Head coach: Owen Davidson
- Championships: None
- Division titles: None
- Playoff berths: 1974
- Section titles: 1974

The Minnesota Buckskins were a charter franchise of World Team Tennis (WTT) founded by Lee Meade, Len Vannelli and John Finley. The Buckskins played only one season before folding after the 1974 season. The Buckskins had 27 wins and 17 losses and were the Gulf Plains Section Champions. They lost to the Denver Racquets in the Western Division Championship Series ending their season.

== Team history ==
The Buckskins were founded by Lee Meade, Len Vannelli and John Finley as a charter member of WTT in 1973.

Prior to the inaugural WTT draft, each franchise was entitled to sign a player in advance and then use its first-round draft selection on that player. Before the team even had a name, the Minnesota franchise made an aggressive play for Billie Jean King who was widely regarded as a player with the ability to generate much interest and ticket sales. Minnesota negotiated a major advertising campaign for King to endorse candy. The contract offered by Minnesota to King would have obligated her to play for the team for five years and pay her compensation in excess of $2 million paid out over ten years. Most of the money in the contract would have come from the endorsement. In addition, the team would have been named the Minnesota Kings. However, King (and WTT league executives) believed it would be better for her to play in the eastern United States. Therefore, she solicited offers from the New York and Philadelphia franchises before signing a five-year contract worth $1 million with Philadelphia where she thought there would be better commercial opportunities. King claimed she could earn up to $75,000 for spending a couple hours making a television commercial. "Man, I'm not dumb," she said. "Get it while you can." King went on to win the 1974 WTT Most Valuable Player Award while leading the Philadelphia Freedoms to the best regular-season record in WTT.

Minnesota's top 10 draft choices in the WTT inaugural draft were

Round	No.	Overall	Player chosen
1	11	11	Linda Tuero
2	6	22	Owen Davidson
3	11	43	Stan Smith
4	6	54	Pat Walkden-Pretorius
5	11	75	Bob Hewitt
6	6	86	Brenda Kirk
7	11	107	Patrick Proisy
8	6	118	Corrado Barazzutti
9	11	139	Nathalie Fuchs
10	6	150	Sue Stap

Just before the start of the season, Meade, Vannelli and Finley sold the Buckskins to Hennepin County businessman Burt McGlynn of McGlynn Bakeries. The team played its home matches at the Metropolitan Sports Center in Bloomington, Minnesota starting with WTT's inaugural 1974 season.

The first match in Buckskins' history was a 30–28 loss to the Houston E-Z Riders at home on May 7, 1974, in front of 2,317 fans. The Buckskins drew a crowd of 9,300 for their home match against King and the Freedoms.

The Buckskins featured player-coach Owen Davidson, Ann Haydon-Jones, Bob Hewitt, Shari Barman, David Lloyd, Mona Schallau, Wendy Turnbull and Terry Holladay

The Buckskins finished the season with 27 wins and 17 losses and were the Gulf Plains Section Champions. They were matched up with the E-Z Riders in the Western Division Semifinals.

WTT playoff series in the division semifinals and division championship series in 1974, were played over two legs, one match on the home court of each team. The team with the best aggregate score over the two matches was the winner. The higher seed had the right to choose whether to play the first or second match at home. The Buckskins chose to open at home and lost the first match to the E-Z Riders, 28–19. The Buckskins went to Houston and dominated the E-Z Riders in the second match, 29–19, to squeeze out a win in the series, 48–47, and advance to the Western Division Championship Series against the Denver Racquets. The Buckskins won four of the five sets in the second division semifinal match to pull off the stunning comeback. Schallau and Turnbull recorded a 6–0 set win over Karen Krantzcke and Lesley Bowrey in women's doubles. Haydon-Jones beat Helen Gourlay, 6–3, in women's singles. Davidson and Schallau topped Dick Stockton and Lesley Bowrey. The E-Z Riders had a cumulative lead in the two matches of 43–42 heading to the final set of the second match which Davidson and Schallau won by a score of 6–4.

Following the division semifinal victory over the E-Z Riders, it was reported that WTT had taken over the Buckskins and paid players six weeks of back salaries.

The Racquets chose to open the series at home won the first match in Denver, 29–18. Françoise Dürr of the Racquets beat Haydon-Jones, 6–1, in women's singles and then teamed with Kris Kemmer Shaw to beat Turnbull and Schallau in women's doubles by the same 6–1 score. The Buckskins came back at home to win the second match, 26–25. It was not enough as the Racquets won the Western Division title by a cumulative score of 54–44 and ended the season for Minnesota.

Despite the Buckskins' success on the court and the large crowd for the match against the Freedoms, the team was unable to generate enough revenue for McGlynn to consider it viable. He tried to sell the Buckskins to local investors after the season ended. On November 6, 1974, McGlynn announced that the local interests in the Buckskins had dried up, and the team would either fold or be sold and moved. He mentioned that there was interest from investor groups in Indianapolis and Washington, D.C. The investor group from Indianapolis ended up buying the Detroit Loves, and the group from Washington decided not to buy a team. On November 26, 1974, WTT announced at its annual meeting that the Buckskins had become the first team in the league to fold. WTT conducted a dispersal draft of the Buckskins' players at its annual meeting using an auction system. Davidson and Haydon-Jones went to the Cleveland Nets. Hewitt went to the Los Angeles Strings. Schallau and Turnbull went to the New York Sets. Holladay went to the Houston E-Z Riders.

== Hall of Fame players ==
The following players who are enshrined in the International Tennis Hall of Fame played for the Minnesota Buckskins:

- Owen Davidson
- Ann Haydon-Jones

== 1974 roster ==
The Minnesota Buckskins roster for the 1974 season was

- (Australia) Owen Davidson, Player-Coach
- (United States) Shari Barman
- (United Kingdom) Ann Haydon-Jones
- (South Africa) Bob Hewitt
- (United States) Terry Holladay
- (United Kingdom) David Lloyd
- (United States) Mona Schallau
- (Australia) Wendy Turnbull

== See also ==
- World TeamTennis
- 1974 World Team Tennis season
