= Florida Flamingos =

- Sport: Team tennis
- Founded: May 22, 1973
- Folded: February 1, 1975
- League: World TeamTennis
- Division: Western
- Team history: Florida Flamingos (1974)
- Based in: Miami Beach, Florida
- Stadium: Miami Beach Convention Center
- Colors: Red, Hot Pink
- Owner: Ted Cohen (majority); Butch Buchholz (minority)
- President: Ted Cohen
- Head coach: Frank Froehling
- Championships: None
- Division titles: None
- Playoff berths: None

The Florida Flamingos were a charter franchise of World Team Tennis (WTT) founded by Ted Cohen and Butch Buchholz. The Flamingos played only one season before folding after the 1974 season. The Flamingos had 19 wins and 25 losses and finished in third place in the Gulf Plains Section, missing the playoffs.

== Team history ==
The Flamingos were founded as WTT's charter franchise for St. Louis, Missouri in 1973, by Pittsburgh businessman Ted Cohen and former tennis player Butch Buchholz. Before the team ever had a name in St. Louis, the owners decided, with WTT approval, to have the team play its home matches in Miami Beach, Florida at the Miami Beach Convention Center starting with the league's inaugural season in 1974 season and name it the Florida Flamingos. The move from St. Louis to Miami Beach was approved by July 25, 1973, when WTT announced the order for its inaugural draft in which the Flamingos, then still nameless and referred to by WTT as the Miami franchise, had the top selection.

Once the decision had been made to play in Miami Beach, Flamingos president Ted Cohen secured the services of Frank Froehling as player-coach. Flamingos minority-owner Butch Buchholz was the player-coach for the Chicago Aces. Cliff Drysdale was selected in the draft and signed by the team as its primary men's singles player. While many WTT teams were signing female stars but having trouble signing their top male draft choices, the Flamingos had the opposite problem. Their top female draft pick (and the number 1 overall selection in the draft) was Chris Evert who was from nearby Fort Lauderdale, Florida. At the time, Evert was engaged to marry Jimmy Connors and had not decided on a wedding date. Connors had already signed with the Baltimore Banners, and Evert wanted to be free to spend time with him in Baltimore if the two got married during the WTT season. In February 1974, Cohen said that his odds of signing Evert appeared to be 50–50. When the season started, Evert hadn't signed with the Flamingos, and her relationship with Connors ended before they ever got married.

The team's inaugural match was a 27–26 home victory over the Los Angeles Strings on May 8, 1974, in front of 5,126 fans. The match opened with men's singles as Jerry Van Linge of the Strings took a set from Drysdale, 6–4. Drysdale later came back to win the second set between the two, 6–2. Marita Redondo of the Strings won two sets of women's singles, first against Maria Bueno, and then against Laurie Fleming, and the Strings had a commanding lead. The Flamingos mixed doubles team of Betty Ann Grubb and Mark Cox dominated the final set of the match against Karen Hantze Susman and Geoff Masters, 6–2, to complete a heroic comeback.

The Flamingos found themselves in the midst of controversy on May 29, 1974, during a home match against the Boston Lobsters. The Lobsters had a 20–18 lead in the match playing the final set of mixed doubles. With the score of the game tied 3–3, referee Kurt Wallach ruled that a Boston point would have to be replayed, because neither he nor the linesman saw the point made. The point would have given the Lobsters a 21–19 lead in the match. The Lobsters players complained and left the court. When they failed to return within 30 seconds, the referee awarded the game to the Flamingos, 4–3, cutting the Lobsters' lead in the match to 20–19. The referee gave the Lobsters 30 more seconds to return to the court and continue the set. After another 30 seconds had elapsed, the referee awarded the set and the match to the Flamingos with a final score of 20–20. The Lobsters were not permitted to play a match tiebreaker. The Lobsters filed an official protest with WTT over the referee's ruling. Lobsters' general manager John Korff said that the "situation of horrendous officiating cannot be tolerated." He added that low quality officiating "destroys the credibility of World Team Tennis and cannot be compared to any official sport." Lobsters' player-coach Ion Țiriac said, "Due to my participation in World Team Tennis, I have been banned from European tournaments, banned from playing Davis Cup and banned by my own Romanian Tennis Federation. I break my back for my team. We all fight together, and this is the kind of officiating we get. This is not tennis." WTT denied the Lobsters' protest.

On July 14, 1974, the Flamingos made national news when they released three-time Wimbledon and four-time US Open champion Maria Bueno, who was 34 years old at the time. Bueno had lost all four sets of women's singles she had played up to that point in the season and was suffering from an arm injury. Flamingos coach Frank Froehling had not been using her in matches. Team president Ted Cohen said, "It was one of the hardest things I ever had to do. I feel real bad about it, because I was the one who convinced her to come out of Brazil and play WIT. But the cold, hard fact was that Maria could not be depended upon to go out there on a match-to-match basis and win. You're talking about one of the great women ever to play the game sitting on the bench."

More controversy came the Flamingos' way in the form of a love triangle. At the start of the season, Grubb had been dating tennis pro Ken Stuart. When the team took a road trip to Los Angeles, Stuart, who was managing John Wayne's tennis club in Newport Beach, California at the time, ended the relationship. It then appeared that Grubb started dating Froehling, her coach. Froehling would neither confirm nor deny the relationship, but he was described by a local sportscaster as Grubb's "constant off-court companion." When WTT took a midseason break for Wimbledon, Grubb went home to California, and she and Stuart reignited their relationship. After the break, Stuart had some vacation time to use and decided to follow the team to spend time with Grubb. He secured permission from team president Cohen to travel with the team in its station wagon. After Drysdale pulled a leg muscle in July, and Cox needed time away from the team to attend to his wife's pregnancy, the Flamingos were in need of a male player. So, they signed Stuart. Around that time, Stuart and Grubb got engaged. Asked about the drama, Froehling said, "I think it's fine they're together. She's happy, and he helps her tennis. He's been really cooperative, but it's a little awkward and unusual with a boyfriend on the road."

The Flamingos finished the season with 19 wins and 25 losses, third place in the Gulf Plains Section and missed the playoffs.

At the WTT owners meeting on February 1, 1975, each team was required to post a $500,000 letter of credit. The Flamingos failed to do so and were contracted by WTT. A dispersal draft was conducted to distribute the players from those five teams among the remaining teams in the league.

== 1974 roster ==
The Florida Flamingos roster for the 1974 season was

- (United States) Frank Froehling, Player-Coach
- (Canada) Mike Belkin
- (Brazil) Maria Bueno (released during the season)
- (United Kingdom) Mark Cox
- (South Africa) Cliff Drysdale
- (United States) Donna Floyd Fales
- (United States) Laurie Fleming
- (United States) Betty Ann Grubb
- (United States) Ken Stuart

Maria Bueno was the only player to have played for the Flamingos who has been enshrined as a player in the International Tennis Hall of Fame. Flamingos minority owner Butch Buchholz has also been enshrined as a player in the Hall of Fame. While he was a minority owner of the Flamingos, Buchholz was the player-coach of the Chicago Aces in 1974. Cliff Drysdale has been enshrined in the Hall of Fame as a contributor.

== See also ==
- World TeamTennis
- 1974 World Team Tennis season
