= Philadelphia Freedoms (1974) =

Defunct American tennis tournament franchise

- Sport: Team tennis
- Founded: May 22, 1973
- Folded: March 27, 1975 (moved to Boston prior to the 1975 season)
- League: World TeamTennis
- Division: Eastern
- Team history: Philadelphia Freedoms; 1974; Boston Lobsters; 1975–1978
- Based in: Philadelphia, Pennsylvania
- Stadium: The Spectrum
- Colors: Dark midnight blue, medium bright Venetian red
- Owner: Dick Butera, Ken Butera
- President: Dick Butera
- Head coach: Billie Jean King
- Championships: None
- Division titles: 1974
- Playoff berths: 1974
- Section titles: 1974

The Philadelphia Freedoms were a charter franchise of World Team Tennis (WTT) founded by Dick and Ken Butera. The Freedoms played only one season in Philadelphia before being sold at the end of the 1974 season, moving to Boston and changing their name to the Boston Lobsters. Led by WTT Most Valuable Player Billie Jean King, the Freedoms posted the best regular-season record in WTT's inaugural season with 39 wins and 5 losses. The Freedoms won the Eastern Division Championship and reached the WTT Finals where they lost to the Denver Racquets.

== Team history ==
The Freedoms were founded by Dick and Ken Butera as a charter member of WTT in 1973. The team began play in WTT's inaugural 1974 season. The Freedoms played their home matches at the Spectrum. The centerpiece of the team was tennis legend Billie Jean King who served as its player-coach. King became the first woman to coach a professional sports team that included male players.

Once King was signed on with the Freedoms, her good friend Elton John decided to write and record the song "Philadelphia Freedom" to wish her luck on her new venture with WTT and for the team to use as an anthem. John was such a big fan of the Freedoms that he attended home matches wearing the team's uniform and sat on the bench with the players. Although recorded in the summer of 1974, the song was not released until February 24, 1975, after the Freedoms had already played their final match in Philadelphia.

King heavily recruited then 17-year-old amateur Betsy Nagelsen to sign with the Freedoms. Although Nagelsen has often been listed as a member of the team, including by its 21st century namesake, this is untrue. Nagelsen was not listed on the roster in the game program for the Freedoms' match against the Baltimore Banners on May 17, 1974. After working under King's tutelage for three weeks during the summer of 1974, Nagelsen lost to her in straight sets in the third round of the 1974 US Open. After the match, Nagelsen said she hoped to play with King on the Freedoms in 1975. On the same date the Freedoms were playing in the Match 2 of the WTT Finals, Nagelsen was playing in the final of the Virginia Slims of Newport in what was her first professional tournament.

King's performance on the court earned her the WTT Most Valuable Player Award as she led the Freedoms to 39 wins and 5 losses, first place in the Atlantic Section and the best regular-season record in WTT.

WTT playoff series in the division semifinals and division championship series in 1974, were played over two legs, one match on the home court of each team. The team with the best aggregate score over the two matches was the winner. As the higher seed, the Freedoms had the choice to play either the first or the second match at home. The Freedoms met the Cleveland Nets in the Eastern Division Semifinals and won both matches, 26–22 in Cleveland and 23–22 at home. The Freedoms clinched the series when Fred Stolle playing mixed doubles in the fifth set served an ace on match point in the second match.

The victory over the Nets advanced the Freedoms to the Eastern Division Championship Series against the Pittsburgh Triangles. Again, the Freedoms chose to open on the road and won the first match, 31–21, in Pittsburgh and then lost the second, 24–21, at home. By an aggregate score of 52–45, the Freedoms won the Eastern Division Championship and advanced to the WTT Finals.

In the WTT Finals, the Freedoms met the Denver Racquets. The Racquets swept the best-of-three series, winning 27–21 in Denver and 28–24 in Philadelphia, to win the title and end the Freedoms' season.

At the 1974 WTT draft, player-coach King made the selections for the Freedoms. In the seventh round, she chose Bobby Riggs, against whom she had won the Battle of the Sexes 14 months earlier. In announcing the selection, King said, "We haven't made up our mind in which division we'll play him." The following day, Riggs was quoted as saying, "It sounds like a great idea, but is the money right?" He added that he didn't know how King "plans to use me—as a mixed doubles partner or as a ladies' doubles partner." Since they had been unable to sign her after selecting her in the 1973 draft, the Freedoms also chose Nagelsen in order to protect their rights to her. The Freedoms had previously rejected an offer from the Houston E-Z Riders who sought to acquire Nagelsen in a trade. Many WTT teams selected celebrities such as Johnny Carson and Bill Cosby at the 1974 draft. The Freedoms' colorful draft choice was Elton John.

Following the 1974 season, WTT owners were looking to develop a plan for growth of the league. Many were of the opinion that it would be in all their interests to have a successful franchise in New York City. With some encouragement from his fellow owners, Dick Butera traded King to the New York Sets in a complicated deal, on February 5, 1975. Upon announcing the trade, Butera said, "It's not an easy thing to let Billie Jean go. I feel like King Faisal giving away his oil wells."

After King was traded, a group of investors that included Bob Mades, Paul Slater, Herbert S. Hoffman, Robert K. Kraft and Harold Bayne expressed interest in buying the original Boston Lobsters. However, the Lobsters had already been contracted by WTT. With the Buteras far less enthusiastic about their team after trading King, the two sides struck a deal, and the group purchased the Freedoms on March 27, 1975, and moved the team to Boston. In order to claim the name of the original Lobsters, the new ownership group would be required to settle some of the debts of the former team. The new owners decided to do this and renamed the team the Boston Lobsters.

== 1974 season record ==
Year	W	L	PCT	Playoff result	Titles won
1974	39	5	.886	Won Eastern Division Semifinals; Won Eastern Division Championship Series; Lost in WTT Finals	Eastern Division Champions; Atlantic Section Champions; Best regular-season record in WTT

== Roster ==
- (United States) Billie Jean King, Player-Coach, 1974 WTT Most Valuable Player
- (United States) Julie Anthony
- (New Zealand) Brian Fairlie
- (United States) Tory-Ann Fretz
- (United States) Kathy Kuykendall
- (United Kingdom) Buster Mottram
- (Australia) Fred Stolle

Billie Jean King and Fred Stolle have been enshrined in the International Tennis Hall of Fame.

== See also ==
- Boston Lobsters (1974–1978)
- Philadelphia Freedoms
