= New Orleans Sun Belt Nets =

Team tennis franchise

- Sport: Team tennis
- Founded: May 22, 1973
- Folded: November 10, 1978
- League: World TeamTennis
- Division: Eastern
- Team history: Cleveland Nets; 1974–1976; Cleveland–Pittsburgh Nets; 1977; New Orleans Sun Belt Nets; 1978
- Based in: New Orleans, Louisiana
- Stadium: Louisiana Superdome
- Colors: Imperial Red, Dark Blue
- Owner: Joseph Zingale
- President: Joseph Zingale
- Head coach: Marty Riessen
- Championships: None
- Division titles: None
- Playoff berths: 1974 (as Cleveland Nets); 1977 (as Cleveland–Pittsburgh Nets); 1978 (as New Orleans Sun Belt Nets)

The New Orleans Sun Belt Nets were a charter franchise of World Team Tennis (WTT). The team first played as the Cleveland Nets in 1974, and was known as the Cleveland–Pittsburgh Nets in 1977, when it played roughly half of its home matches in each city. The Nets moved to New Orleans for the 1978 season. Following the 1978 season, the Nets announced that the team would fold. The Nets played all five seasons in WTT from the league's inception in 1974, until its suspension of operations after the 1978 season. The team had losing records in each of its five seasons.

== Team history ==
=== Inaugural season ===
Cleveland Nets logo used from 1974 to 1976.

The Nets were founded as WTT's charter franchise for Cincinnati, Ohio in 1973, by Bill DeWitt Jr. and Brian Heekin. Within weeks of being established, and before the team ever had a name in Cincinnati, DeWitt and Heekin sold it to Cleveland radio executive Joseph Zingale who paid them the same $50,000 as the franchise fee they had paid to WTT. Zingale relocated the team to Cleveland with a plan to have it play its home matches at the Cleveland Public Hall starting with the league's inaugural 1974 season and name it the Cleveland Nets. Before the draft, Zingale spoke to Clark Graebner, a native of Cleveland, about playing for the team as well as to being its coach and general manager. Graebner insisted his wife, Carole, had to be drafted by the team as well. The Nets selected them both as a pair in the fourth round of the draft. No other WTT team objected to the Nets selecting two players with one draft choice. When Clark and Carole Graebner separated, Clark traded Carole to the Pittsburgh Triangles. The couple never divorced, and Carole Graebner died in 2008. Peaches Bartkowicz was a key women's doubles player for the 1974 Nets but quit the team during the season. Through all the drama, the Nets finished with 21 wins and 23 losses, third in the Atlantic Section and snuck into the playoffs.

WTT division semifinals and division championship series in 1974, were played over two legs, one match on the home court of each team. The team with the best aggregate score over the two matches was the winner. The Nets met the Philadelphia Freedoms in the Eastern Division Semifinals. The Freedoms had the best regular-season record in the league and were led by WTT Most Valuable Player Billie Jean King. As the higher seed, the Freedoms had the choice to play either the first or the second match at home. Despite playing two tight matches, the Nets lost them both, 26–22 at home and 23–22 in Philadelphia, and saw their season come to an end.

=== A rookie sensation ===
Clark Graebner's Northwestern Wildcats college teammate Marty Riessen joined the Nets for the 1975 season as a player and the team's new coach. Although Graebner was relieved of coaching duties, he remained with the team as a player. Riessen had been drafted by the Chicago Aces in 1974, but he decided not to sign with the team. The Aces lost the rights to him when they folded after the 1974 season.

In addition to their new coach, the Nets also got a new home for 1975, as they moved into the brand-new Coliseum at Richfield in Richfield Township, Summit County, Ohio.

Riessen was a big success between the lines. He was named Male All-Star Match Most Valuable Player, led the WTT in game-winning percentage in men's singles and was named Male Rookie of the Year.

Despite Riessen's excellent play, the Nets finished with 16 wins and 28 losses, last place in the Eastern Division and missed the playoffs.

=== Nets sign Navratilova ===
Prior to the 1976 season, the Nets signed 19-year-old Martina Navratilova to a $150,000 contract and gave her a large diamond pendant in the shape of a "#1." Navratilova had defected from Czechoslovakia the previous year. Despite the presence of Navratilova, the Nets endured another losing season finishing with 20 wins and 24 losses, third place in the Eastern Division and missed the playoffs.

=== One star leaves and another arrives to find a team of two cities ===
Logo with no city used in 1977, when the team was known as the Cleveland–Pittsburgh Nets.

The Pittsburgh Triangles folded following the 1976 season. With Pittsburgh and Philadelphia both lacking franchises, the league had considered fielding a team called the Pennsylvania Keystones in 1977, composed of players from the Soviet Union. However, with the Nets struggling to draw fans in Richfield, owner Joseph Zingale decided to fill the WTT void in nearby Pittsburgh and have his team play approximately half of its home matches in Richfield and the other half in Pittsburgh. The team was called the Cleveland–Pittsburgh Nets. After the Nets announced they would play half their matches in Pittsburgh, the league had planned to have the Keystones play in Philadelphia. The team of Soviet players did compete in WTT in 1977, but it did not have a permanent home and played its "home" matches in several different cities. The name Pennsylvania Keystones was scrapped, and the team was officially called the Soviet National Team or the Soviets.

As for the Nets, they played approximately half their 1977 home matches at the Coliseum at Richfield and the other half at the Civic Arena in Pittsburgh. The Nets also played some "home" matches in Nashville, New Orleans, St. Louis and Hollywood, Florida.

When Björn Borg, whom had been the Nets top draft choice in the inaugural WTT draft in 1973, expressed interest in playing in WTT, the team seized the opportunity to sign him for the 1977 season. Unable to afford the salaries of both Borg and Martina Navratilova, the Nets traded Navratilova to the Boston Lobsters for Wendy Turnbull. Borg was a big contributor to the Nets in 1977. He was the Male All-Star Match Most Valuable Player, led WTT in game-winning percentage in men's singles and was the Male Rookie of the Year.

But despite all the fanfare surrounding the big-money contract the Nets gave Borg and the presence of one of the world's top male players on the team, Nets owner Joe Zingale found a way to shine the spotlight even brighter on his team when he signed transsexual Renée Richards to a contract on June 2. At the press conference announcing her signing, Richards said, "I am thankful that I'm being given the opportunity to play professional tennis at the level that I have tried to play, but which has been met with so much frustration that I have been unable to do." When he was asked about whether WTT had approved Richards as a female player, Zingale said, "I didn't ask them. That's not the way I work. There's a lot of politics involved when you try to get approval from everybody for such a move." At the time of the signing, Richards was embroiled in litigation with the United States Tennis Association (USTA) which had denied her entry into the United States Open Tennis Championships as a female player, because she refused to take the Barr body test of her chromosomes as required by USTA rules. Not wanting to lock horns with the USTA, WTT ruled Richards not eligible to play as a female player until her court case was decided.

The Nets' home match against the San Diego Friars in South Florida on July 17, featuring Borg against Rod Laver in men's singles drew 8,470 fans.

Despite the stellar play of Borg, the Nets finished with 16 wins and 28 losses, fourth in the Eastern Division. This was good enough to earn them a berth in the Eastern Division Semifinals against the Lobsters who were led by Navratilova, their former teammate.

The Lobsters won the opening match in Boston, 30–26, on August 16. The following day, the New York State Supreme Court ruled in favor of Richards in her case against the USTA stating in its opinion that requiring Richards to take the test was "grossly unfair, discriminatory and inequitable and violative of her rights" and added, "it seems clear defendants [USTA] knowingly instituted this test for the sole purpose of preventing plaintiff [Richards] from participating in the tournament." The USTA immediately placed Richards in the main draw of the 1977 US Open bypassing qualification. WTT commissioner Butch Buchholz immediately sent the Nets a telegram confirming that Richard was now eligible to play as a female.

While there was much anticipation that Richards might make her WTT debut in the second match of the playoff series against the Lobsters a day after her victory in court, she was not on the bench when the match started. Nevertheless, the Nets staved off elimination in Richfield with a 21–20 victory. Marty Riessen and Turnbull opened the match with a 6–2 set win over Mike Estep and Greer Stevens in mixed doubles. Borg followed with a set win over Tony Roche by the same score to give the Nets an early 12–4 lead. The Lobsters fought back and took a 16–15 lead to the final set, men's doubles. Riessen and Borg topped Roche and Estep, 6–4, to take the match.

Prior to the third and deciding playoff match, Richards had expressed uncertainty about jumping into the team while the Nets were in the midst of a playoff series. Nets coach Riessen said that he planned to watch Richards warming up with the team before making the decision about having her play. Richards did not play in the match, and the Nets lost, 21–20, despite Turnbull taking the women's singles set from Navratilova, the player for whom she was traded, 7–6.

=== Move to New Orleans ===
Nets owner Joe Zingale was disappointed with the attendance in both Richfield and Pittsburgh. Since the Nets had played one of their 1977 home matches at the Louisiana Superdome in New Orleans and drawn a fairly large crowd, he decided to move the team there and rename it the New Orleans Sun Belt Nets with the plan of playing most of the home matches in the Superdome and a few in other cities in the southern United States. In addition to being called the New Orleans Sun Belt Nets, the team was sometimes referred to simply as the New Orleans Nets, often when they were playing home matches in New Orleans, and sometimes referred to as the Sun Belt Nets or the Sunbelt Nets, often when they were playing home matches outside New Orleans.

Renée Richards finally made her long-awaited WTT debut with the Nets in 1978. Starting about a quarter of the way through the season, she and two-sport athlete John Lucas were successful as the Nets' regular mixed-doubles team. The Nets finished with 20 wins and 24 losses, fourth place in the Eastern Division, losing out on third place by a standings tiebreaker. Their finish sent the Nets to a rematch with the Boston Lobsters in the Eastern Division Semifinals which the Lobsters won, ending the Nets' season.

Following the 1978 season, between October 27 and November 9, the New York Apples, Boston Lobsters, Los Angeles Strings, San Diego Friars and Indiana Loves all announced that they were folding, cutting the size of WTT from 10 teams to five. On the following day, the Nets, Anaheim Oranges and Seattle Cascades announced that they were folding as well.

== Season-by-season records ==
The following table shows regular season records, playoff results and titles won by the New Orleans Sun Belt Nets franchise since its founding in 1974.

Year	Team Name	W	L	PCT	Playoff result	Titles won
1974	Cleveland Nets	21	23	.477	Lost in Eastern Division Semifinals	
1975	Cleveland Nets	16	28	.364	Missed playoffs	
1976	Cleveland Nets	20	24	.455	Missed playoffs	
1977	Cleveland–Pittsburgh Nets	16	28	.364	Lost in Eastern Division Semifinals	
1978	New Orleans Sun Belt Nets	20	24	.455	Lost in Eastern Division Semifinals	
Subtotals	Cleveland Nets	57	75	.432	WTT Finals: 0 wins, 0 losses All Playoff Series: 0 wins, 1 loss, .000	
Subtotals	Cleveland–Pittsburgh Nets	16	28	.364	WTT Finals: 0 wins, 0 losses All Playoff Series: 0 wins, 1 loss, .000	
Subtotals	Cleveland Nets; Cleveland–Pittsburgh Nets	73	103	.415	WTT Finals: 0 wins, 0 losses All Playoff Series: 0 wins, 2 losses, .000	
Subtotals	New Orleans Sun Belt Nets	20	24	.455	WTT Finals: 0 wins, 0 losses All Playoff Series: 0 wins, 1 loss, .000	
Grand; Totals		93	127	.423	WTT Finals: 0 wins, 0 losses All Playoff Series: 0 wins, 3 losses, .000	None

== Home courts ==
The following table shows the primary home venues used by the New Orleans Sun Belt Nets franchise.

Venue	Location	Duration	
Venue	Location	Start	End
Cleveland Public Hall	Cleveland, Ohio	1974	1974
Richfield Coliseum	Richfield Township, Summit County, Ohio	1975	1977
Civic Arena	Pittsburgh, Pennsylvania	1977	1977
Louisiana Superdome	New Orleans, Louisiana	1978	1978

The Coliseum at Richfield and the Civic Arena both served as primary home venues in 1977, with nearly half the Nets' matches being played in each arena. The Nets also played one 1977 home match at the Louisiana Superdome. In 1977 and 1978, the Nets played some home matches in various cities including Nashville, Oklahoma City, El Paso, Biloxi and Hollywood, Florida.

== Individual honors ==
The following table shows individual honors bestowed upon players and coaches of the New Orleans Sun Belt Nets franchise.

Year	Player/Coach	Award
1975	Marty Riessen	Male All-Star Match Most Valuable Player
1975	Marty Riessen	Male Rookie of the Year
1977	Björn Borg	Male All-Star Match Most Valuable Player
1977	Björn Borg	Male Rookie of the Year

== Hall of Fame players ==
The following players who are enshrined in the International Tennis Hall of Fame played for the New Orleans Sun Belt Nets franchise:

- Björn Borg (1977–1978)
- Martina Navratilova (1976)

== Final roster ==
The New Orleans Sun Belt Nets final roster for the 1978 season was

- (United States) Marty Riessen, Player-Coach
- (Sweden) Björn Borg
- (United States) Patricia Bostrom
- (Australia) Helen Gourlay-Cawley
- (United States) John Lucas
- (Rhodesia) Andrew Pattison
- (United States) Renée Richards
- (Australia) Wendy Turnbull

== See also ==
- World TeamTennis
