= Phoenix Racquets =

Team tennis franchise

- Sport: Team tennis
- Founded: May 22, 1973
- Folded: March 1979
- League: World TeamTennis
- Division: Western
- Team history: Denver Racquets; 1974; Phoenix Racquets; 1975–1978
- Based in: Phoenix, Arizona
- Stadium: Arizona Veterans Memorial Coliseum
- Colors: Golden Yellow, Black
- Owner: Reggie Jackson, Gary K. Walker
- President: Jimmy Walker
- Head coach: Syd Ball
- Championships: 1974 (as Denver Racquets)
- Division titles: 1974 (as Denver Racquets); 1977 (as Phoenix Racquets)
- Playoff berths: 1974 (as Denver Racquets); 1975, 1976, 1977 (as Phoenix Racquets)
- Section titles: 1974 (as Denver Racquets)

The Phoenix Racquets were a charter franchise of World Team Tennis (WTT). The team was founded as the Denver Racquets and won the 1974 WTT championship in the league's inaugural season, before moving to Phoenix in 1975. Following the 1978 season, eight of the 10 WTT franchises folded leaving only the Racquets and the San Francisco Golden Gaters prepared to participate in the 1979 season. WTT suspended operations of the league in March 1979, ending the Racquets existence.

== Team history ==
=== Inaugural season ===
Denver Racquets logo used in 1974.

The Racquets were founded by San Diego businessmen Bud Fischer and Frank Goldberg along with Ben Press in 1973. The team began play in WTT's inaugural 1974 season, and played their home matches at the Denver Auditorium Arena in 1974. Press served as a nonplaying assistant coach for the Racquets.

The Racquets' inaugural match was a 35–26 loss at the Oakland-Alameda County Coliseum Arena to the San Francisco Golden Gaters on May 8, 1974.

The team got off to a rough start in the inaugural season of WTT winning only two of their first 10 matches. However, the Racquets went 28–6 from there and won the Pacific Section Championship with a record of 30 wins and 14 losses.

WTT playoff series in the division semifinals and division championship series in 1974, were played over two legs, one match on the home court of each team. The team with the best aggregate score over the two matches was the winner. As the higher seed, the Racquets had the choice to play either the first or the second match at home. The Racquets met the San Francisco Golden Gaters in the Western Division Semifinals and won both matches, 29–17, at home and 32–24, in Oakland to advance to the Western Division Championship Series against the Minnesota Buckskins.

The Racquets chose to play the opening match at home and won it against the Buckskins, 29–18. Françoise Dürr of the Racquets beat Ann Haydon-Jones, 6–1, in women's singles and then teamed with Kris Kemmer Shaw to beat Wendy Turnbull and Mona Schallau in women's doubles by the same 6–1 score. The Buckskins came back in Minnesota to win the second match, 26–25. Despite the Buckskins' victory in the match, the Racquets kept the score close by winning three of the five sets. This gave the Racquets a victory in the series by a cumulative score of 54–44 and made them Western Division Champions.

In the WTT Finals, the Racquets met the Philadelphia Freedoms who had the league's best regular-season record and were led by their player-coach and WTT Most Valuable Player Billie Jean King. The Racquets swept the best-of-three series, 27–21 at home and 28–24 in front of 5,134 fans in Philadelphia, to win the championship. In the second match, Andrew Pattison's 6–0 set win in men's singles proved too much for the Freedoms to overcome despite winning three of the five sets in the match. Buster Mottram started that set for the Freedoms against Pattison. King sent Brian Fairlie in as a substitute after Mottram fell behind, 3–0, and managed only three points in those three games. Fairlie didn't fare better, not getting any points in his first two games.

The second match of the finals opened with Dürr falling behind King, 4–0, in women's singles. Dürr won the next four games to tie the set before falling, 6–4. Pattison's men's singles victory gave the Racquets a 10–6 lead. The Freedoms followed with a 7–6 tiebreaker victory in women's doubles posted by King and Julie Anthony over Dürr and Kemmer Shaw that cut the Racquets lead to 16–13. It was the only women's doubles set Dürr and Kemmer Shaw lost in the playoffs. Fairlie and Fred Stolle cut the Racquets' lead to 22–20 with a 7–6 set win over Pattison and Tony Roche in men's doubles. When Anthony and Stolle broke Roche's serve in the second game of the final set, the Freedoms were ahead 2–0 in the set, and the match was tied at 22. The Racquets broke back in the next game on Anthony's serve, and the teams both held serve for the next five games. With the set tied at 4, and the Racquets leading the match, 26–24, Denver broke Roche's serve to give themselves a chance to serve for the championship. Roche followed by serving out the match.

Following the clinching win in the second match, Racquets player-coach Roche admitted he didn't think it would mean quite so much to win the first World Team Tennis championship. Roche said, "It's great. I'd compare it to a Davis Cup team effort. We started off with a lousy record. Something like 2 and 8. Everybody felt team pressure. Then one night after a loss to Los Angeles, we all went out, had a few beers, and decided to relax. It paid off, and now I feel great."

Pattison's stellar play earned him the Playoffs Most Valuable Player Award. Pattison downplayed his award saying, "There is no most valuable player in a team effort." Roche was named Coach of the Year. The other members of the Racquets' championship team were Dürr, Kemmer Shaw, Stephanie Johnson and the brother and sister Jeff and Pam Austin.

Pattison's playoff performance was somewhat surprising. He won only 17 of 40 (.425) sets he played in men's singles during the regular season. He won 5 of 6 (.833) in the playoffs. Dürr was solid for the Racquets all season. She won 4 of 6 (.667) women's singles sets in the playoffs and 30 of 39 (.612) overall. Dürr and Kemmer Shaw won 5 of 6 (.833) women's doubles sets in the playoffs and 26 of 40 (.650) overall. Roche and Pattison won 4 of 6 (.667) men's doubles sets in the playoffs and 27 of 38 (.711) overall. Roche and Kemmer Shaw won 3 of 5 (.600) sets in the playoffs, including the championship-clinching set, and 21 of 29 (.724) overall.

None of the Racquets players went back to Denver after winning the championship. They all went to New York City to play in the US Open.

Following the season, Fischer, Goldberg and Press put the team up for sale, and a new ownership group that included Reggie Jackson and his agent Gary K. Walker bought the Racquets on February 6, 1975, and moved them to Phoenix, Arizona.

=== Move to Phoenix ===
The Racquets broke even in their first season in Phoenix finishing with 22 wins and 22 losses, second place in the Western Division. The Racquets played their home matches at the Arizona Veterans Memorial Coliseum.

The Racquets hosted the Western Division Semifinal Match against the Los Angeles Strings and dominated the Strings in a 20–8 victory.

The Western Division Championship Series was a best two-of-three match series. The Racquets fell in two straight matches to the San Francisco Golden Gaters, 25–24 and 26–20, ending their season.

=== Return to prominence ===
On October 29, 1975, the Racquets announced that they had acquired the rights to negotiate with superstar Chris Evert from the Golden Gaters. Under the terms of the deal, the Racquets would send a player to be named later and undisclosed cash consideration to the Golden Gaters if they were able to sign Evert. If the Racquets failed to sign Evert before the 1976 season, the rights to her would revert to the Golden Gaters. The Golden Gaters had tried unsuccessfully to sign Evert after the 1975 season. When the trade was announced, Golden Gaters owner Dave Peterson said, "Chris indicated she had a strong preference for starting her World Team Tennis career in Phoenix. I feel her decision was greatly influenced by the fact that her closest friend, Kris Shaw, is on the Phoenix roster. We hated to make the deal. If it were just a matter of money we would have signed Chris, but money wasn't the major factor." After signing Evert, the Racquets sent Françoise Dürr to the Golden Gaters to complete the deal.

In 1976, the Racquets raced to the top of the Western Division standings with a record of 30 wins and 14 losses, 2 games ahead of the Golden Gaters. However, for the second straight season, the Racquet fell in the playoffs to the Golden Gaters in two straight matches, 32–16 and 24–18. The Racquets' new superstar Evert was named Female Most Valuable Player and Female Rookie of the Year.

Under the leadership of new player-coach Ross Case, the Racquets had their second consecutive first-place finish (and third in four seasons) in 1977, with a record of 28 wins and 16 losses, 3 games ahead of the Golden Gaters. Chris Evert repeated as Female Most Valuable Player.

The Racquets swept the Sea-Port Cascades in the Western Division Semifinals, two games to none, 30–14 and 27–26. Meanwhile, the Golden Gaters fell in their semifinal series to the San Diego Friars, eliminating the chance that the Racquets and Golden Gaters could meet in the playoffs for the fourth straight season. The Racquets dropped the first match of their series against the Friars, who had a losing record during the regular season, 29–26. However, the Racquets came back to win the second and third matches, 27–20 and 30–22, to win the second Western Division Championship in franchise history and first since the team moved to Phoenix.

In the WTT Finals, the Racquets faced the defending champion New York Apples. The Apples swept the Racquets in two straight matches, 27–22 and 28–17, to end the season for Phoenix. Key points in the series were Sandy Mayer's 6–1 set win for the Apples over the Racquets' Butch Walts and Virginia Wade of the Apples dominating Chris Evert in a 6–0 set win.

=== Final season ===
Following her back-to-back female most valuable player awards, Chris Evert sought to leverage her value to WTT and as the year-ending number 1 player in the world each of the previous three years (1975 to 1977). Since the Racquets were unable to meet her demands, Evert's rights were traded to the Los Angeles Strings who signed her to a multi-year $1.2 million contract. Without Evert, under the leadership of their new coach Syd Ball, the Racquets slipped to a record of 14 wins and 30 losses in 1978, last place in the Western Division.

Following the 1978 season, eight of the 10 WTT franchises folded leaving only the Racquets and the Golden Gaters prepared to participate in the 1979 season. A few weeks after most of the franchises announced they were folding, WTT announced the creation of three new expansion franchises in Dallas, Los Angeles and San Diego and said that there would be five more expansion franchises chosen from a pool of candidates. WTT suspended operations of the league in March 1979, ending the Racquets existence.

== Season-by-season records ==
The following table shows regular season records, playoff results and titles won by the Phoenix Racquets franchise since its founding in 1974.

Year	Team Name	W	L	PCT	Playoff result	Titles won
1974	Denver Racquets	30	14	.682	Won Western Division Semifinals; Won Western Division Championship Series; Won WTT Finals	WTT Champions; Western Division Champions; Pacific Section Champions
1975	Phoenix Racquets	22	22	.500	Won Western Division Semifinal Match; Lost in Western Division Championship Series	
1976	Phoenix Racquets	30	14	.682	Lost in Western Division Championship Series	
1977	Phoenix Racquets	28	16	.636	Won Western Division Semifinals; Won Western Division Championship Series; Lost in WTT Finals	Western Division Champions
1978	Phoenix Racquets	14	30	.318	Missed playoffs	
Subtotals	Denver Racquets	30	14	.682	WTT Finals: 1 win, 0 losses, 1.000; All Playoff Series: 3 wins, 0 losses, 1.000	WTT Champions - 1 (1974); Western Division Champions - 1 (1974); Pacific Section Champions - 1 (1974)
Subtotals	Phoenix Racquets	94	82	.534	WTT Finals: 0 wins, 1 loss, .000; All Playoff Series: 3 wins, 3 losses, .500	WTT Champions - 0 Western Division Champions - 1 (1977)
Grand; Totals		124	96	.564	WTT Finals: 1 win, 1 loss, .500; All Playoff Series: 6 wins, 3 losses, .667	WTT Champions - 1 (1974); Western Division Champions - 2 (1974, 1977); Pacific Section Champions - 1 (1974)

== Home courts ==
The following table shows home courts used by the Phoenix Racquets franchise.

Venue	Location	Duration	
Venue	Location	Start	End
Denver Auditorium Arena	Denver, Colorado	1974	1974
Arizona Veterans Memorial Coliseum	Phoenix, Arizona	1975	1978

== Individual honors ==
The following table shows individual honors bestowed upon players and coaches of the Phoenix Racquets franchise.

Year	Player/Coach	Award
1974	Tony Roche	Coach of the Year
1974	Andrew Pattison	Playoffs Most Valuable Player
1976	Chris Evert	Female Most Valuable Player
1976	Chris Evert	Female Rookie of the Year
1977	Chris Evert	Female Most Valuable Player

== Hall of Fame players ==
The following players who are enshrined in the International Tennis Hall of Fame played for the Phoenix Racquets franchise:

- Françoise Dürr
- Chris Evert
- Tony Roche

== Final roster ==
The Phoenix Racquets final roster for the 1978 season was

- (Australia) Syd Ball, player-coach
- (United Kingdom) Sue Barker
- (United States) Rayni Fox
- (United States) Dean Paul Martin Jr.
- (United States) Kristien Shaw
- (United States) Butch Walts

== Titles ==
Preceded by none	World Team Tennis Champions; 1974	Succeeded by Pittsburgh Triangles
