= Pittsburgh Triangles =

Tennis Team in United States

- Founded: May 22, 1973
- Folded: 1976
- League: World TeamTennis
- Team history: Pittsburgh Triangles; 1974 – 1976
- Based in: Pittsburgh, Pennsylvania
- Stadium: Civic Arena
- Colors: Bright Yellow and Green
- Owner: Frank Fuhrer (majority); Chuck Reichblum (minority); William Sutton (minority)
- President: Chuck Reichblum
- Head coach: Ken Rosewall (1974); Vic Edwards (1975); Mark Cox (1976); Dan McGibbeny (1976)
- General manager: Chuck Reichblum
- Championships: 1975
- Division titles: 1975
- Playoff berths: 1974, 1975, 1976

The Pittsburgh Triangles were a charter franchise of World Team Tennis (WTT). The Triangles won the 1975 WTT Championship. The team folded after the 1976 season.

== Team history ==
The Triangles were founded in 1973 as a charter member of WTT by Century Features, Inc. owner Charles "Chuck" Reichblum (later popularly known as "Dr. Knowledge"), industrialist John H. Hillman III, and lawyer William "Bill" Sutton. In 1972, the three Pittsburgh executives had previously founded the similar National Tennis League (NTL), a forerunner to WTT and Reichblum's brainchild, which was made redundant by the advent of WTT (founding members of which had been invited to join the NTL prior to formation of the competing WTT in 1973).

The team began play in WTT's inaugural 1974 season. Just prior to the start of the Triangles' initial season, on May 1, 1974, Fox Chapel insurance broker, sports promoter, and financier Frank B. Fuhrer purchased a controlling interest in the team. Fuhrer was elected the team's chairman. Reichblum remained president and general manager. Sutton remained part of the ownership group and was re-elected as the team's secretary-treasurer and general counsel.

The Triangles played their home matches at the Civic Arena in Pittsburgh, Pennsylvania. During their first season, the Triangles, clad in bright yellow and green uniforms, played in the WTT Eastern Division with teams from Philadelphia, Boston, New York, Baltimore, Detroit, Cleveland, and Toronto-Buffalo. The Triangles folded following the 1976 season.

== Coaching ==
The Australian tennis star Ken Rosewall coached the original Pittsburgh Triangles team in 1974. Rosewall's top players were Evonne Goolagong, who had already captured her first Wimbledon singles title in 1971, and young phenom Vitas Gerulaitis. Vitas, nicknamed the Lithuanian Lion, had recently won the West Penn Open in Mt. Lebanon and would go on to win the 1975 Wimbledon men's doubles crown (with Sandy Mayer) and the 1977 Australian Open men's singles title.

== Players ==
=== Squad 1974 ===
Evonne Goolagong was not allowed to participate in the 1974 French Open due to her association with WTT and the Triangles.

- (Australia) Ken Rosewall, head coach
- (United States) Vitas Gerulaitis
- (Australia) Evonne Goolagong
- (United States) Peggy Michel
- (United States) Harold Solomon
- (United States) Laura duPont
- (United States) Mona Schallau
- (United States) Jeff Borowiak
- (United States) Kathy Blake
- (United States) Patrick DuPre
- (United States) Jane Stratton
- (United States) Tom Edlefsen
- (Wales) Gerald Battrick
- (United States) Brian Teacher
- Isabel Fernández
- (India) Anand Amritraj
- (Italy) Paolo Bertolucci

=== Squad 1975 ===
Two days after winning the WTT championship Fuhrer traded Kim Warwick and Rayni Fox to the Cleveland Nets for Sue Stap.

- (Australia) Vic Edwards, Head Coach
- (United Kingdom) Mark Cox
- (United States) Rayni Fox
- (United States) Vitas Gerulaitis
- (Australia) Evonne Goolagong-Cawley
- (United States) Peggy Michel
- (Australia) Kim Warwick

=== Squad 1976 ===
With Goolagong-Cawley signed for the 1976 season, Mark Cox was elevated to the Triangles' player-coach. The Triangles also recruited college star JoAnne Russell and Bernard Mitton. Midway through the 1976 season the recently acquired Sue Stap was traded for Nancy Gunter.

- (United Kingdom) Mark Cox
- Dan McGibben, Head Coach (2nd half)
- (United States) Vitas Gerulaitis
- (Australia) Evonne Goolagong-Cawley
- (United States) Nancy Gunter (mid-season)
- (South Africa) Bernard Mitton – 1976 Davis Cup
- (United States) JoAnne Russell
- (United States) Sue Stap

== Results ==
- 1974: 30-14 Second in Central Section of Eastern Division—defeated Detroit 63-27 First Round—lost to Philadelphia 52-45 Eastern Division Final
- 1975: 36-8 First in Eastern Division—Bye in First Round—defeated Boston 2 games to 0 Eastern Division Final—defeated Golden Gaters (San Francisco) 2 games to 1 for WTT Championship
- 1976: 24-20 Second in Eastern Division—lost to New York 2 games to 1 Eastern Division Final
- 1977: Become Pennsylvania Keystones during off-season, intending to play home games in both Pittsburgh and Philadelphia; fold before season begins primarily due to financial reasons.
