= 1974 World Team Tennis season =

- Duration: May 6 – August 18, 1974
- Eastern Division Champions champions: Philadelphia Freedoms
- Western Division Champions champions: Denver Racquets

WTT Finals
- Date: August 26, 1974 (Match 2)
- Venue: Philadelphia, Pennsylvania (Match 2)
- Champions: Denver Racquets

WTT Seasons seasons
- 1975

The 1974 World Team Tennis season was the inaugural season of the top professional team tennis league in the United States. The Denver Racquets defeated the Philadelphia Freedoms in the WTT Finals to win the league's first championship.

== Competition format ==
The 1974 World Team Tennis season included 16 teams split into two divisions (Eastern and Western). The Eastern Division was further split into two sections (Atlantic and Central) which each had four teams. The Western Division was also split into two sections (Gulf Plains and Pacific) which also had four teams each. Each team played a 44-match regular-season schedule with 22 home and 22 away matches. The section champions and the two teams in each division with the best records among non section champions qualified for the division championship semifinals. The team with the best record among playoff qualifiers from the division played the team with the fourth best record in the semifinals. The teams with the second and third best records played each other in the semifinals. Teams were not given preference in seeding based on being champions of their section. The semifinal winners met the other semifinals winners from their own division to determine the division champions. The division champions met in the World Team Tennis Final.

At the start of the season, each match comprised two sets of men's singles, two sets of women's singles and two sets of mixed doubles. No men's doubles or women's doubles were played. The mixed doubles sets were played as the third and sixth sets. The coach of the home team decided whether to play men's or women's singles first and fourth or second and fifth. WTT changed the match format on May 18, 1974, to one set each of men's singles, women's singles, men's doubles, women's doubles and mixed doubles, because of concern that the matches were taking too long. The order of play was women's doubles first, men's doubles third and mixed doubles fifth. The coach of the home team decided whether men's or women's singles would be played second or fourth. Games were decided by the first player or doubles team to reach four points with no-ad scoring. Each set ended when one team had won either six or seven games and had an advantage over its opponent of at least two games. Sets that were tied 6–6 were decided by a tiebreaker. Set tiebreaker games were nine total points with the first player or doubles team to reach five the winner. An advantage of only one point was needed to win a tiebreaker game. Matches could end when one team built an insurmountable lead. For example, if a team had a 24–17 lead after four sets, the fifth set (mixed doubles) would not be played. If a team had a 22–19 lead after four sets, the match could end if the leading team won four games in the fifth set, since it would be impossible for the trailing team to make up the three-game deficit that existed when the set started. If the match was tied at the end of five sets, a super tiebreaker game was played between the mixed doubles teams using the same format as the set tiebreaker games. Teams often agreed to play dead sets even if the outcome of the match had already been decided or to play sets to completion when the outcome of the match was decided within that set.

Playoff matchups in the division semifinals and division championship series were played in two legs with each team hosting one match and the cumulative score determining the winner. The higher seed had the choice to host either the first or the second match. Should the cumulative score be tied after the conclusion of the second match, a series tiebreaker game was played to determine the series winner. The WTT Finals were a best-of-three series. The lower seed hosted the first match. The higher seed hosted the second match and the third, if necessary.

== Charter franchises and relocation ==
On May 22, 1973, WTT announced the formation of the league with the following 16 franchises:

| Team | Founder(s) |
|---|---|
| Boston | Raymond Ciccolo |
| Chicago | Jordon H. Kaiser, Walter Kaiser |
| Cincinnati | Bill DeWitt, Jr., Brian Heekin |
| Denver | Bud Fischer, Frank Goldberg, Ben Press |
| Detroit | Seymour Brode, Marshall Greenspan |
| Houston | E.Z. Jones, Betty Jones |
| Los Angeles | Dennis Murphy, Fred Barman, Jerry Fine, Jerry Buss |
| Minnesota | Lee Meade, Len Vannelli, John Finley |
| New York | Jerry Saperstein |
| Philadelphia | Dick Butera, Ken Butera |
| Phoenix | Gary Davidson |
| Pittsburgh Triangles | John H. Hillman, III, William Sutton, Chuck Reichblum |
| St. Louis | Ted Cohen, Butch Buchholz |
| San Diego | Dr. Leonard Bloom |
| San Francisco | Larry King, Cathie Anderson |
| Buffalo | John F. Bassett, John C. Eaton, III |

As shown in the above table, the Pittsburgh Triangles had a team name from the time the franchise was chartered.

On May 30, 1973, the San Diego franchise announced that it had adopted the name San Diego Swingers.

Before the WTT inaugural draft on August 3, 1973, the St. Louis franchise had relocated and was referred to as the Miami franchise at the draft.

Also before the draft, the Cincinnati franchise had been sold to Joseph Zingale and relocated to Cleveland.

Finally, by the time the inaugural draft took place, the San Francisco franchise had adopted the name the Golden Gate Otters and was referred to as the Golden Gate franchise during the draft.

On August 21, 1973, the New York franchise announced it had adopted the name New York Sets.

By September 1973, the Los Angeles franchise had been named the Los Angeles Strings.

Before the start of the 1974 season, the Phoenix franchise was sold to Howard Fine, Gerald Klauber, Joseph Rivkin and Robert E. Bradley, Jr. who moved it to Baltimore.

Also before the start of the 1974 season, the San Diego Swingers were sold to Don Kelleher who moved them to Honolulu.

Finally, before the start of the 1974 season, the Golden Gate Otters decided to simply call the team the Golden Gaters in dealings with the public. Since it would have been absurd to call the team the Golden Gate Golden Gaters, and the league used a location to identify all its teams, WTT reverted to using San Francisco, the location for which the original charter was issued, when referring to the team. They were listed in official WTT standings as the San Francisco Golden Gaters.

The remaining charter franchises adopted names before the start of the 1974 season. The team identification and naming history of the 16 charter franchises from the founding of WTT to the start of the inaugural season is as follows:

- Boston → Boston Lobsters
- Chicago → Chicago Aces
- Cincinnati → Cleveland → Cleveland Nets
- Denver → Denver Racquets
- Detroit → Detroit Loves
- Houston → Houston E-Z Riders
- Los Angeles → Los Angeles Strings
- Minnesota → Minnesota Buckskins
- New York → New York Sets
- Philadelphia → Philadelphia Freedoms
- Phoenix → Baltimore Banners
- Pittsburgh Triangles
- St. Louis → Miami → Florida Flamingos
- San Diego → San Diego Swingers → Honolulu Swingers → Hawaii Leis
- San Francisco → Golden Gate Otters → San Francisco Golden Gaters
- Buffalo → Toronto-Buffalo Royals

== Inaugural draft ==
WTT conducted a lottery to determine the order of selection for its inaugural draft held on August 3, 1973. The selection order determined as a result of the lottery was used for odd-numbered rounds, and it was reversed for even-numbered rounds. Each team was entitled to select 20 players. Teams that could sign players to contracts before the draft had to identify these players as preferential choices and use their earliest picks on the players signed. The players selected in the first 10 rounds of the draft are shown in the tables below.

First round

| No. | Team | Player chosen |
|---|---|---|
| 1 | Miami | Chris Evert |
| 2 | Boston | Kerry Melville |
| 3 | San Diego Swingers | Rod Laver |
| 4 | Phoenix | Jimmy Connors |
| 5 | Pittsburgh Triangles | Ken Rosewall |
| 6 | Detroit | Rosemary Casals |
| 7 | Houston | John Newcombe (Note: Preferential choice.) |
| 8 | Golden Gate Otters | Margaret Court |
| 9 | Los Angeles | John Alexander |
| 10 | New York | Roy Emerson |
| 11 | Minnesota | Linda Tuero |
| 12 | Philadelphia | Billie Jean King |
| 13 | Cleveland | Björn Borg |
| 14 | Chicago | Marty Riessen |
| 15 | Toronto | Tom Okker |
| 16 | Denver | Tony Roche |

Second round

| No. | Team | Player chosen |
|---|---|---|
| 1 | Denver | Françoise Dürr |
| 2 | Toronto | Marita Redondo |
| 3 | Chicago | Julie Heldman |
| 4 | Cleveland | Nancy Gunter |
| 5 | Philadelphia | Fred Stolle |
| 6 | Minnesota | Owen Davidson |
| 7 | New York | Pam Teeguarden |
| 8 | Los Angeles | Valerie Ziegenfuss |
| 9 | Golden Gate Otters | Frew McMillan |
| 10 | Houston | Dick Stockton |
| 11 | Detroit | Brian Gottfried |
| 12 | Pittsburgh Triangles | Evonne Goolagong |
| 13 | Phoenix | Betty Stöve |
| 14 | San Diego Swingers | Karen Hantze Susman |
| 15 | Boston | Nikola Pilić |
| 16 | Miami | Roscoe Tanner |

Third round

| No. | Team | Player chosen |
|---|---|---|
| 1 | Miami | Frank Froehling |
| 2 | Boston | Roger Taylor |
| 3 | San Diego Swingers | Wendy Overton |
| 4 | Phoenix | Janet Newberry |
| 5 | Pittsburgh Triangles | Harold Solomon |
| 6 | Detroit | Kerry Harris |
| 7 | Houston | Karen Krantzcke |
| 8 | Golden Gate Otters | Dennis Ralston |
| 9 | Los Angeles | Julie Anthony |
| 10 | New York | Sandy Mayer |
| 11 | Minnesota | Stan Smith |
| 12 | Philadelphia | Brian Fairlie |
| 13 | Cleveland | Raymond Moore |
| 14 | Chicago | Bob Lutz |
| 15 | Toronto | Pierre Barthès |
| 16 | Denver | Erik van Dillen |

Fourth round

| No. | Team | Player chosen |
|---|---|---|
| 1 | Denver | Kris Kemmer Shaw |
| 2 | Toronto | Lesley Hunt |
| 3 | Chicago | Judy Tegart Dalton |
| 4 | Cleveland | Clark and Carole Graebner |
| 5 | Philadelphia | Cliff Drysdale |
| 6 | Minnesota | Pat Walkden-Pretorius |
| 7 | New York | Cliff Richey |
| 8 | Los Angeles | Ross Case |
| 9 | Golden Gate Otters | Tom Gorman |
| 10 | Houston | Lesley Turner Bowrey |
| 11 | Detroit | Phil Dent |
| 12 | Pittsburgh Triangles | Vitas Gerulaitis |
| 13 | Phoenix | Bob Carmichael |
| 14 | San Diego Swingers | Ilie Năstase |
| 15 | Boston | Sharon Walsh |
| 16 | Miami | Marcie Louie |

Fifth round

| No. | Team | Player chosen |
|---|---|---|
| 1 | Miami | Adriano Panatta |
| 2 | Boston | Paul Gerken |
| 3 | San Diego Swingers | Jan Kodeš |
| 4 | Phoenix | Barry Phillips-Moore |
| 5 | Pittsburgh Triangles | Laura duPont |
| 6 | Detroit | Virginia Wade |
| 7 | Houston | Helen Gourlay |
| 8 | Golden Gate Otters | Ann Kiyomura |
| 9 | Los Angeles | Vijay Amritraj (Tamil: விஜய் அம்ரித்ராஜ்) |
| 10 | New York | Arthur Ashe |
| 11 | Minnesota | Bob Hewitt |
| 12 | Philadelphia | Laura Rossouw |
| 13 | Cleveland | Peaches Bartkowicz |
| 14 | Chicago | Ray Ruffels |
| 15 | Toronto | Karl Meiler |
| 16 | Denver | Andrew Pattison |

Sixth round

| No. | Team | Player chosen |
|---|---|---|
| 1 | Denver | Colin Dibley |
| 2 | Toronto | Raúl Ramírez |
| 3 | Chicago | Janet Young |
| 4 | Cleveland | Pancho Gonzales |
| 5 | Philadelphia | Tory Fretz |
| 6 | Minnesota | Brenda Kirk |
| 7 | New York | Barbara Downs |
| 8 | Los Angeles | Kathy Kuykendall |
| 9 | Golden Gate Otters | Jürgen Fassbender |
| 10 | Houston | Bill Bowrey |
| 11 | Detroit | Allan Stone |
| 12 | Pittsburgh Triangles | Mona Schallau |
| 13 | Phoenix | Janice Metcalf |
| 14 | San Diego Swingers | Alex Metreveli (Georgian: ალექსანდრე მეტრეველი) |
| 15 | Boston | Jeanne Evert |
| 16 | Miami | Patrice Dominguez |

Seventh round

| No. | Team | Player chosen |
|---|---|---|
| 1 | Miami | Patti Hogan |
| 2 | Boston | Mike Estep |
| 3 | San Diego Swingers | Maria Bueno |
| 4 | Phoenix | Joyce Williams |
| 5 | Pittsburgh Triangles | Jeff Borowiak |
| 6 | Detroit | Mary-Ann Beattie |
| 7 | Houston | Ceci Martinez |
| 8 | Golden Gate Otters | Jim McManus |
| 9 | Los Angeles | Geoff Masters |
| 10 | New York | Kazuko Sawamatsu (Japanese: 沢松和子) |
| 11 | Minnesota | Patrick Proisy |
| 12 | Philadelphia | Laurie Fleming |
| 13 | Cleveland | Bill Lloyd |
| 14 | Chicago | Billy Martin |
| 15 | Toronto | Helga Masthoff |
| 16 | Denver | Alex Olmedo |

Eighth round

| No. | Team | Player chosen |
|---|---|---|
| 1 | Denver | Stephanie Johnson |
| 2 | Toronto | Laurie Tenney |
| 3 | Chicago | Marie Neumanová |
| 4 | Cleveland | Onny Parun |
| 5 | Philadelphia | Buster Mottram |
| 6 | Minnesota | Corrado Barazzutti |
| 7 | New York | Haroon Rahim |
| 8 | Los Angeles | Kathy May |
| 9 | Golden Gate Otters | Ilana Kloss |
| 10 | Houston | Bob McKinley |
| 11 | Detroit | Corinne Molesworth |
| 12 | Pittsburgh Triangles | Kathy Blake |
| 13 | Phoenix | Dick Crealy |
| 14 | San Diego Swingers | Roy Barth |
| 15 | Boston | Ismail El Shafei (Arabic: إسماعيل الشافعي) |
| 16 | Miami | Mark Cox |

Ninth round

| No. | Team | Player chosen |
|---|---|---|
| 1 | Miami | Olga Morozova (Russian: Ольга Васильевна Морозова) |
| 2 | Boston | Patricia Bostrom |
| 3 | San Diego Swingers | Ann Haydon-Jones |
| 4 | Phoenix | Lost draft choice |
| 5 | Pittsburgh Triangles | Pat DuPré |
| 6 | Detroit | Jaime Fillol |
| 7 | Houston | Ray Keldie |
| 8 | Golden Gate Otters | Susan Mehmedbasich |
| 9 | Los Angeles | Leif Johansson |
| 10 | New York | Gene Scott |
| 11 | Minnesota | Nathalie Fuchs |
| 12 | Philadelphia | Dianne Fromholtz |
| 13 | Cleveland | Katja Ebbinghaus |
| 14 | Chicago | Bobby Riggs |
| 15 | Toronto | Guillermo Vilas |
| 16 | Denver | Pam Austin |

Tenth round

| No. | Team | Player chosen |
|---|---|---|
| 1 | Denver | Jeff Austin |
| 2 | Toronto | Mike Belkin |
| 3 | Chicago | Andrés Gimeno |
| 4 | Cleveland | Mal Anderson |
| 5 | Philadelphia | John Paish |
| 6 | Minnesota | Sue Stap |
| 7 | New York | Manuel Santana |
| 8 | Los Angeles | Jane Albert Willens |
| 9 | Golden Gate Otters | Pancho Segura |
| 10 | Houston | Daryl Gralka |
| 11 | Detroit | Nancy Ornstein |
| 12 | Pittsburgh Triangles | Jane Stratton |
| 13 | Phoenix | Joaquín Loyo Mayo |
| 14 | San Diego Swingers | Glynis Coles |
| 15 | Boston | Ion Țiriac |
| 16 | Miami | Neale Fraser |

== Standings and attendance ==
Eastern Division
| Pos | Team | MP | W | L | PCT | MB |
Atlantic Section
| 1 | Philadelphia Freedoms | 44 | 39 | 5 | .886 | 0 |
| 2 | Boston Lobsters | 44 | 19 | 25 | .432 | 20 |
| 3 | Baltimore Banners | 44 | 16 | 28 | .364 | 23 |
| 4 | New York Sets | 44 | 15 | 29 | .341 | 24 |
Central Section
| 1 | Detroit Loves | 44 | 30 | 14 | .682 | 0 |
| 2 | Pittsburgh Triangles | 44 | 30 | 14 | .682 | 0 |
| 3 | Cleveland Nets | 44 | 21 | 23 | .477 | 9 |
| 4 | Toronto-Buffalo Royals | 44 | 13 | 31 | .295 | 17 |

| 1974 Eastern Division Playoffs |

- Detroit won a standings tiebreaker over Pittsburgh and was the Central Section Champion.

Western Division
| Pos | Team | MP | W | L | PCT | MB |
Gulf Plains Section
| 1 | Minnesota Buckskins | 44 | 27 | 17 | .614 | 0 |
| 2 | Houston E-Z Riders | 44 | 25 | 19 | .568 | 2 |
| 3 | Florida Flamingos | 44 | 19 | 25 | .432 | 8 |
| 4 | Chicago Aces | 44 | 15 | 29 | .341 | 12 |
Pacific Section
| 1 | Denver Racquets | 44 | 30 | 14 | .682 | 0 |
| 2 | San Francisco Golden Gaters | 44 | 23 | 21 | .523 | 7 |
| 3 | Los Angeles Strings | 44 | 16 | 28 | .364 | 14 |
| 4 | Hawaii Leis | 44 | 14 | 30 | .318 | 16 |

| 1974 Western Division Playoffs |

Total attendance during the season was 833,966, for an average of 2,369 over 352 playing dates.

== Playoff bracket ==
Division Semifinals (August 19–20)
E1 | Philadelphia Freedoms | 49
E4 | Cleveland Nets | 44
Eastern Division
E2 | Detroit Loves | 27
E3 | Pittsburgh Triangles | 63
W1 | Denver Racquets | 61
W4 | San Francisco Golden Gaters | 41
Western Division
W2 | Minnesota Buckskins | 48
W3 | Houston E-Z Riders | 47

Division Championships (August 22–23)
E1 | Philadelphia Freedoms | 52
E3 | Pittsburgh Triangles | 45
W1 | Denver Racquets | 54
W2 | Minnesota Buckskins | 44

WTT Finals (August 25–26)
1 | Philadelphia Freedoms | 0
2 | Denver Racquets | 2

== Playoff match results ==
- Home teams are in CAPS.

=== Eastern Division semifinals ===
(1) Philadelphia Freedoms vs. (4) Cleveland Nets
| Date | Match | Result |
| August 19 | 1 | Philadelphia Freedoms 26, CLEVELAND NETS 22 |
| August 20 | 2 | PHILADELPHIA FREEDOMS 23, Cleveland Nets 22 |
** Series: Philadelphia Freedoms 49, Cleveland Nets 44

(2) Detroit Loves vs. (3) Pittsburgh Triangles
| Date | Match | Result |
| August 19 | 1 | Pittsburgh Triangles 31, DETROIT LOVES 10 |
| August 20 | 2 | PITTSBURGH TRIANGLES 32, Detroit Loves 17 |
** Series: Pittsburgh Triangles 63, Detroit Loves 27

=== Western Division semifinals ===
(1) Denver Racquets vs. (4) San Francisco Golden Gaters
| Date | Match | Result |
| August 19 | 1 | DENVER RACQUETS 29, San Francisco Golden Gaters 17 |
| August 20 | 2 | Denver Racquets 32, SAN FRANCISCO GOLDEN GATERS 24 |
** Series: Denver Racquets 61, San Francisco Golden Gaters 41

(2) Minnesota Buckskins vs. (3) Houston E-Z Riders
| Date | Match | Result |
| August 19 | 1 | Houston E-Z Riders 28, MINNESOTA BUCKSKINS 19 |
| August 20 | 2 | Minnesota Buckskins 29, HOUSTON E-Z RIDERS 19 |
** Series: Minnesota Buckskins 48, Houston E-Z Riders 47

=== Eastern Division Championship ===
(1) Philadelphia Freedoms vs. (3) Pittsburgh Triangles
| Date | Match | Result |
| August 22 | 1 | Philadelphia Freedoms 31, PITTSBURGH TRIANGLES 21 |
| August 23 | 2 | Pittsburgh Triangles 24, PHILADELPHIA FREEDOMS 21 |
** Series: Philadelphia Freedoms 52, Pittsburgh Triangles 45

=== Western Division Championship ===
(1) Denver Racquets vs. (2) Minnesota Buckskins
| Date | Match | Result |
| August 22 | 1 | DENVER RACQUETS 29, Minnesota Buckskins 18 |
| August 23 | 2 | MINNESOTA BUCKSKINS 26, Denver Racquets 25 |
** Series: Denver Racquets 54, Minnesota Buckskins 44

=== WTT Finals ===
(1) Philadelphia Freedoms vs. (2) Denver Racquets
| Date | Match | Result |
| August 25 | 1 | DENVER RACQUETS 27, Philadelphia Freedoms 21 |
| August 26 | 2 | Denver Racquets 28, PHILADELPHIA FREEDOMS 24 |
** Series: Denver Racquets 2, Philadelphia Freedoms 0

Of the total of 14 playoff matches, home teams won only 6 and lost 8. The higher seeds had 3 wins and 4 losses in their 7 home matches. The higher seeds won 5 of the 7 series.

== Individual statistical leaders ==
The table below shows the individual players and doubles teams who had the best winning percentages in each of the five events in WTT.

| Event | Player(s) | Team |
|---|---|---|
| Men's singles | Jimmy Connors | Baltimore Banners |
| Women's singles | Billie Jean King | Philadelphia Freedoms |
| Men's doubles | John Newcombe and Dick Stockton | Houston E-Z Riders |
| Women's doubles | Billie Jean King and Julie Anthony | Philadelphia Freedoms |
| Mixed doubles | Kerry Harris and Allan Stone | Detroit Loves |

== Individual honors ==
| Award | Recipient | Team |
|---|---|---|
| Most Valuable Player | Billie Jean King | Philadelphia Freedoms |
| Coach of the Year | Tony Roche | Denver Racquets |
| Playoffs Most Valuable Player | Andrew Pattison | Denver Racquets |

== See also ==
- 1974 WTA Tour
- 1974 Men's Grand Prix circuit
