= Kristien Shaw =

American tennis player

- Country (sports): United States
- Born: July 25, 1952 (age 73); San Diego, USA
- Height: 5 ft 6 in (1.68 m)
- Plays: Left-handed

Singles
- Career record: 27–36
- Highest ranking: No. 10 (August 21, 1977)

Grand Slam singles results
- French Open: 2R (1973)
- Wimbledon: 4R (1973, 1974)
- US Open: 3R (1973, 1975)

Doubles
- Career record: 41–36

Grand Slam doubles results
- French Open: 2R (1972, 1973)
- Wimbledon: 3R (1972, 1974)
- US Open: QF (1970)

Grand Slam mixed doubles results
- French Open: SF (1973)
- Wimbledon: 4R (1974)
- US Open: SF (1977)

Kristien Shaw, also known as Kristien Shaw-Kemmer, Kristien Kemmer or Kristien Shaw-Ziska (born July 25, 1952) is an American former professional tennis player.

She had a career-high singles ranking of world No. 10 in 1977.

== Career finals ==
=== Doubles (1 loss) ===
Legend
| Grand Slam | 0 |
| WTA Championships | 0 |
| Tier I | 0 |
| Tier II | 0 |
| Tier III | 0 |
| Tier IV & V | 1 |

| Result | W/L | Date | Tournament | Surface | Partner | Opponents | Score |
|---|---|---|---|---|---|---|---|
| Loss | 0–1 | Jan 1977 | Washington DC, USA | Carpet (i) | (United States) Valerie Ziegenfuss | (United States) Martina Navratilova (Netherlands) Betty Stöve | 5–7, 2–6 |

== World Team Tennis ==
In 1974, Shaw was a member of the World Team Tennis champion Denver Racquets.
