= Chicago Aces =

American tennis team (1973–1975)

- Sport: Team tennis
- Founded: May 22, 1973
- Folded: February 1, 1975
- League: World TeamTennis
- Division: Western
- Team history: Chicago Aces (1974)
- Based in: Chicago, Illinois
- Stadium: Chicago Stadium
- Colors: Red, Black Orange
- Owner: Jordon H. Kaiser; Walter Kaiser
- President: Jordon H. Kaiser
- Head coach: Butch Buchholz
- General manager: Jock A. Miller
- Championships: None
- Division titles: None
- Playoff berths: None

The Chicago Aces were a charter franchise of World Team Tennis (WTT) founded by Jordon Kaiser. The Aces played only one season before being contracted by WTT on February 1, 1975. The Aces had 15 wins and 29 losses and finished in last place in the Gulf Plains Section.

== Team history ==
The Aces were founded as a WTT charter franchise in 1973, by Chicago brothers Jordon H. and Walter Kaiser who were involved in general contracting and real estate development. The team began play with the league's inaugural season in 1974 season. The Aces played their home matches in at the Lakeshore Racquet Club in Chicago which was built and owned by the Kaiser brothers. In addition to his responsibilities with the Aces, Jordon Kaiser was initially executive vice-president of WTT. He later became league president and then resigned from that position on August 30, 1974.

WTT teams each had the opportunity to draft 20 players before the inaugural season. The Aces' top draft choice was Marty Riessen who was from Hinsdale, Illinois. As a high school player, Riessen became the first player to win the state of Illinois singles title four times. He played collegiate tennis for the Northwestern Wildcats and reached the NCAA singles final three times, losing all three. He also reached the NCAA doubles semifinals twice with partner Clark Graebner. Between 1963 and 1973, Riessen had been a member of the United States Davis Cup team four times. The Aces were counting on Riessen to be their player-coach and the centerpiece of their team. Less than a week before the start of the season, it seemed a foregone conclusion that Riessen was going to sign with the Aces. While the team did not officially disclose what offer it had made to Riessen, Aces public relations Ralph Leo representative said, "Marty is a good guy. I’ve known him since he was a small child. He wants to play for us, but there are lawyers involved, and you know what that means. He may sign today, he may sign tomorrow. I have been told, unofficially — I haven’t seen the contract — that Marty has been offered a half-million dollar contract over three years. Now that’s pretty good money." Riessen's attorney had prepared his own contract for the team to sign. Days before the season started, Riessen said, "They have a contract in their office. If they sign it, they can have me. Actually, I’d love to be the player-coach for the Aces. All they have to do is agree to terms." Riessen would not disclose the terms of the contract he had submitted to the Aces. But he did say, "The top players are getting between $50,000 and $100,000 for three months, and I consider myself a top player." Despite the enthusiasm he seemed to display for the role of player-coach, Riessen did not sign with the Aces. The team was so certain he would sign that it used his name and image to promote its matches. Donald Dell, Riessen's attorney, said that he advised his client to sue the Aces over this.

Without Riessen, the Aces turned to Butch Buchholz whom they had signed on May 1, to be their player-coach. Including Riessen, the Aces failed to sign any of their top four draft choices and only signed three of their 20 total picks. Players in the fold for the Aces included Ray Ruffels, Janet Young, Sue Stap, Kim Warwick, Graham Stilwell and Tam O'Shaughnessy. Stap was 19 years old at the time and expected to be the Aces' top female player and shoulder most of the women's singles burden.

The Aces struggled all season and finished with 15 wins and 29 losses, last place in the Gulf Plains Section. In addition to the poor showing on the court, the Aces didn't fare well at the gate. There were complaints from players that they were owed salary payments. The team announced that it was up for sale, and there were ongoing negotiations with several groups of investors including one in Atlanta. The team acknowledged the late payment of salaries and said that the statuses of player contracts would be settled after the team was sold.

At the WTT owners meeting on February 1, 1975, each team was required to post a $500,000 letter of credit. Since the Aces failed to do so, the team was contracted by WTT. A dispersal draft was conducted to distribute the players among the remaining teams in the league.

At least one player, Stap, ended up in litigation with the Aces over non payment of compensation. Portions of the court's decision in the case were precedent-setting. As of 2014, the case has been cited at least nine times by Illinois courts.

== 1974 roster ==
Chicago Aces roster for the 1974 season:

- (United States) Butch Buchholz, Player-Coach
- (United States) Tam O'Shaughnessy
- (Australia) Ray Ruffels
- (United States) Sue Stap
- (United Kingdom) Graham Stilwell
- (Australia) Janet Young
- (Australia) Kim Warwick

Buchholz is the only Aces player enshrined in the International Tennis Hall of Fame.
