= Houston E-Z Riders =

- Sport: Team tennis
- Founded: May 22, 1973
- Folded: September 15, 1975
- League: World TeamTennis
- Division: Western
- Team history: Houston E-Z Riders; 1974
- Based in: Houston, Texas; San Antonio, Texas
- Stadium: Sam Houston Coliseum; HemisFair Arena
- Colors: Red, Black
- Owner: E.Z. Jones, Betty Jones
- President: E.Z. Jones
- Head coach: Bill Bowrey
- Championships: None
- Division titles: None
- Playoff berths: 1974

The Houston E-Z Riders were a charter franchise of World Team Tennis (WTT) founded by husband and wife E.Z. and Betty Jones. The E-Z Riders played only one season before suspending operations just before the start of the 1975 season, and later folding. The E-Z Riders had 25 wins and 19 losses and finished second in the Gulf Plains Section in 1974. They lost to the Minnesota Buckskins in the Western Division Semifinals ending their season.

== Team history ==
The E-Z Riders were founded as a charter member of WTT in 1973, by oil industry executive E.Z. Jones, who named the team after himself, and his wife, Betty Jones. The team began play in WTT's inaugural 1974 season. The team played 18 of its 22 home matches at the Sam Houston Coliseum in Houston, Texas and the other four at the HemisFair Arena in San Antonio, Texas.

Prior to the WTT's inaugural draft, the E-Z Riders signed John Newcombe as a preferential choice which effectively made him their first-round draft pick.

The first match in E-Z Riders' history was a 30–28 victory over the Minnesota Buckskins at the Metropolitan Sports Center in Bloomington, Minnesota on May 7, 1974, in front of 2,317 fans. The E-Z Riders won that match despite the absence of their biggest star, Newcombe, the world's number 1 player at the time. The E-Z Riders' home opener at Sam Houston Coliseum was also a victory against the Buckskins.

Aside from Newcombe, other E-Z Riders players included player-coach Bill Bowrey and his wife Lesley, Dick Stockton, Peter Doerner and his wife Cynthia Doerner, Karen Krantzcke, Helen Gourlay and Emilie Burrer.

The E-Z Riders finished the regular season with 25 wins and 19 losses, second place in the Gulf Plains Section, 2 matches behind the Buckskins whom they met in the Western Division Semifinals. Newcombe and Stockton led WTT in game-winning percentage in men's doubles.

WTT playoff series in 1974, were played over two legs, one match on the home court of each team. The team with the best aggregate score over the two matches was the winner. As the higher seed, the Buckskins had the choice to play either the first or the second match at home. After winning the opening match in Minnesota, 28–19, the E-Z Riders went home and lost the second match, 29–19, and narrowly lost the series, 48–47, to end their season. Only 851 fans showed up to cheer on the E-Z Riders in what would prove to be the last match they would ever play.

While several of the original 16 WTT franchises from 1974, had financial difficulties resulting in six of them not returning for and four of them moving before the 1975 season, the E-Z Riders had made plans to go forward in Houston. The team was to play its 1975 home matches in the brand new Astroarena. However, just before the season started, on May 2, 1975, team president and vice-president E.Z. and Betty Jones announced that the E-Z Riders were suspending operations for the 1975 season. Players under contract with the team could be loaned to other WTT teams, and the E-Z Riders had the right to protect four players to return for the 1976 season. There were rumors that the E-Z Riders were behind on their financial obligations. However, E.Z. Jones said, "We are 100% current with our league obligations and our player salaries and have even made salary advances." In order to return to WTT in 1976, the E-Z Riders would need to meet certain league financial requirements and exercise an option by September 15, 1975. The suspension of operations was so sudden and unexpected that newspaper advertisements for E-Z Riders home matches continued to run after the announcement. The E-Z Riders did not exercise their option to return to the league in 1976, and the team folded on September 15, 1975.

== Hall of Fame players ==
The following players who are enshrined in the International Tennis Hall of Fame played for the Houston E-Z Riders:

- John Newcombe
- Lesley Turner Bowrey

== 1974 roster ==
The Houston E-Z Riders roster for the 1974 season was

- (Australia) Bill Bowrey, Player-Coach
- (Australia) Lesley Turner Bowrey
- (United States) Emilie Burrer
- (Australia) Cynthia Doerner
- (Australia) Peter Doerner
- (Australia) Helen Gourlay
- (Australia) Karen Krantzcke
- (Australia) John Newcombe
- (United States) Dick Stockton

== See also ==
- World TeamTennis
- 1974 World Team Tennis season
- Sports in Houston
- List of former professional sports teams in Houston
