= Indiana Loves (1974–1978) =

Team tennis franchise (1974–1978)

- Sport: Team tennis
- Founded: May 22, 1973
- Folded: November 9, 1978
- League: World Team Tennis
- Division: Eastern
- Team history: Detroit Loves; 1974; Indiana Loves; 1975–1978
- Colors: British Racing Green, Chartreuse Yellow
- Owner: Larry Noble, William H. Bereman
- President: William H. Bereman
- Head coach: Allan Stone
- Championships: None
- Division titles: None
- Playoff berths: 1974 (as Detroit Loves); 1977 (as Indiana Loves)
- Section titles: 1974 (as Detroit Loves)

The Indiana Loves were a charter franchise of World Team Tennis (WTT). The team was founded as the Detroit Loves and moved to Indianapolis for the 1975 season. Following the 1978 season, Loves president Larry Noble announced that the team was folding.

== Team history ==
=== Inaugural season ===
Detroit Loves logo used in 1974.

The Loves were founded by Seymour Brode and Marshall Greenspan as a charter franchise of WTT in 1973, and played their home matches at Cobo Arena in downtown Detroit, starting with the league's inaugural season in 1974. The team was led by Rosie Casals, one of the top American female players at the time, and Kerry Harris and Allan Stone, who teamed up to lead WTT in game-winning percentage in mixed doubles. Other players on the inaugural Loves team were Phil Dent, Mary-Ann Beattie and Lenny Simpson. In their franchise opener, on May 9, 1974, before 3,611 fans at Detroit's Cobo Hall, The Loves defeated the Toronto-Buffalo Royals, 28–19. Rosie Casals defeated Wendy Overton 6–2 and then Overton (retired at 4–0) and substitute Laura Rossouw, 6–0. The Loves' Phil Dent split with Tom Okker, 1–6 and then 6–3, while the Mixed Doubles teams split their two sets. Detroit would go on to win the Central Section championship with a record of 30 wins and 14 losses; the Pittsburgh Triangles also finished 30–14, but Detroit was awarded the section title on a tiebreaker.

The first two rounds of the WTT playoffs in 1974 were held on a best-of-two, home-and-home basis, with the team with the best aggregate score over the two matches declared the winner. Detroit was set to play division rival Pittsburgh in the Eastern Division semifinals; as the higher seed, the Loves elected to meet the Triangles in the first match at home and the second on the road. Pittsburgh got their revenge on the Loves by thrashing them, 31–10 in Detroit, and 32–17 in Pittsburgh.

Cobo Arena held 11,000 in its tennis configuration, and Loves management figured they needed 4,200 fans per home date to break even. They did not come close; the 3,611 for their home debut would be their biggest crowd ever, and they drew just 2,213 fans per match for the entire season (their one home playoff match drew a dismal 1,622). After losing a reported $300,000, Brode and Greenspan sold the team to a group led by William H. Bereman and Dan Domont on November 18, 1974, who moved the franchise to Indianapolis and renaming them the Indiana Loves.

=== Move to Indiana ===
The Loves moved into the Indiana Convention Center in downtown Indianapolis for the 1975 season. Led by coach Allan Stone who was a key member of their previous season's section championship team, the Loves struggled to a record of 18 wins and 26 losses, fourth place in the Eastern Division and missed the playoffs.

In 1976, the Loves featured Ann Kiyomura and Ray Ruffels who teamed up to have WTT's best game-winning percentage in mixed doubles. The overall results were not much better than the previous season. The Loves finished with 19 wins and 25 losses, fourth place in the Eastern Division and missed the playoffs again.

=== Return to the playoffs ===
Before the 1977 season, Dan Domont sold out his interest in the Loves, and Larry Noble became the principal owner. William H. Beremen remained part of the ownership group and team president. The Loves added Vitas Gerulaitis and Sue Barker who went on to win the Female Rookie of the Year Award. The Loves committed themselves to a $250,000 contract over two years for Gerulaitis. While they still had a losing record, the Loves improved enough to qualify for the playoffs with a record of 21 wins and 23 losses, third place in the Eastern Division.

The Loves met the defending WTT champion New York Apples in the best-of-three Eastern Division Semifinals. The Apples took the opening match, 33–21. The Loves won the second match, 27–25, to force a deciding third match which the Apples won in dominant fashion, 31–15, to end the Loves' season.

=== Final season ===
In 1978, the Loves moved into the larger Market Square Arena. The team struggled to a record of 13 wins and 31 losses, last place in the Eastern Division.

On November 9, 1978, Loves principal owner Larry Noble announced that the team was folding.

== Season-by-season records ==
The following table shows regular season records, playoff results and titles won by the Indiana Loves franchise since its founding in 1974.

Season records for the Indiana Loves
| Year | Team Name | W | L | PCT | Playoff result | Titles won |
|---|---|---|---|---|---|---|
| 1974 | Detroit Loves | 30 | 14 | .682 | Lost in Eastern Division semifinals | Central Section Champions |
| 1975 | Indiana Loves | 18 | 26 | .409 | Missed playoffs | |
| 1976 | Indiana Loves | 19 | 25 | .432 | Missed playoffs | |
| 1977 | Indiana Loves | 21 | 23 | .477 | Lost in Eastern Division semifinals | |
| 1978 | Indiana Loves | 13 | 31 | .295 | Missed playoffs | |
| Subtotals | Detroit Loves | 30 | 14 | .682 | WTT Finals: 0 wins, 0 losses All Playoff Series: 0 wins, 1 loss, .000 | Central Section Champions - 1 (1974) |
| Subtotals | Indiana Loves | 71 | 105 | .403 | WTT Finals: 0 wins, 0 losses All Playoff Series: 0 wins, 1 loss, .000 | |
| Grand totals | | 101 | 119 | .459 | WTT Finals: 0 wins, 0 losses All Playoff Series: 0 wins, 2 losses, .000 | Central Section Champions - 1 (1974) |

== Home courts ==
The following table shows home courts used by the Indiana Loves franchise.

Home courts of the Indiana Loves
| Venue | Location | Duration | |
| Venue | Location | Start | End |
|---|---|---|---|
| Cobo Arena | Detroit, Michigan | 1974 | 1974 |
| Indiana Convention Center | Indianapolis, Indiana | 1975 | 1977 |
| Market Square Arena | Indianapolis, Indiana | 1978 | 1978 |

== Individual honors ==
Sue Barker was awarded the 1977 Female Rookie of the Year.

== Hall of Fame players ==
The following players who are enshrined in the International Tennis Hall of Fame played for the Indiana Loves franchise:

- Rosie Casals

== Final roster ==
The Indiana Loves final roster for the 1978 season was

- (Australia) Allan Stone, Player-Coach
- (Australia) Dianne Fromholtz
- (South Africa) Tanya Harford
- (United Kingdom) Sue Mappin
- (Australia) Geoff Masters
- (United States) John Whitlinger
