= Toronto-Buffalo Royals =

- Sport: Team tennis
- Founded: May 22, 1973
- Folded: February 1, 1975
- League: World TeamTennis
- Division: Eastern
- Team history: Toronto-Buffalo Royals (1974); Hartford Royals (Never played)
- Based in: Toronto, Ontario, Canada; Buffalo, New York, United States
- Stadium: CNE Coliseum; Buffalo Memorial Auditorium
- Colors: Navy Blue, Light Blue
- Owner: Herbert S. Hoffman, Phyllis Morse
- Head coach: Tom Okker
- Championships: None
- Division titles: None
- Playoff berths: None

The Toronto-Buffalo Royals were a charter franchise of World Team Tennis (WTT) founded by John F. Bassett and John C. Eaton, III. The team was sometimes referred to as the Buffalo-Toronto Royals. The Royals played half of their home matches in Toronto, Ontario, Canada and the other half in Buffalo, New York, United States. The Royals played only one season before being sold and moving to Hartford, Connecticut after the 1974 season. The team was contracted by WTT on February 1, 1975. The Royals had 13 wins and 31 losses, and finished in last place in the Central Section missing the playoffs.

== Team history ==
The Royals were founded by Canadian businessman and retired tennis player John F. Bassett and merchant John C. Eaton, III as a charter member of WTT in 1973. Originally, WTT granted the franchise to Toronto. The team began play in WTT's inaugural 1974 season. The Royals played half of their home matches at the CNE Coliseum in Toronto, Ontario, Canada and the other half at the Buffalo Memorial Auditorium in Buffalo, New York, United States. While WTT identified the team as the Toronto-Buffalo Royals in its official standings, the team was sometimes called the Buffalo-Toronto Royals by the Canadian media among others. The team identified itself as the Toronto-Buffalo Royals in its media guide and promotional materials such as team pennants.

The Royals' main attraction was player-coach Tom Okker. However, Okker's contract allowed him to be excused from his commitment to the Royals when he had opportunities to play in ATP or Grand Slam tournaments. So, Okker was effectively a part-time player. The Royals struggled to a record of 13 wins and 31 losses, last place in the Central Section.

On October 16, 1974, team president Bassett announced that the Royals had been sold to Bert Hoffman and Phyllis Morse who said that they would move the team to Hartford, Connecticut.

At the WTT owners meeting on February 1, 1975, each team was required to post a $500,000 letter of credit. Since the Royals failed to do so, the team was contracted by WTT. A dispersal draft was conducted to distribute the players among the remaining teams in the league.

== Home courts ==
The following table shows home courts used by the Toronto-Buffalo Royals in 1974, the only season in which they competed in WTT.

| Venue | Location | Duration | | Notes |
| Venue | Location | Start | End | Notes |
|---|---|---|---|---|
| CNE Coliseum | Toronto, Ontario, Canada | 1974 | 1974 | Home venue for half of the team's matches |
| Buffalo Memorial Auditorium | Buffalo, New York, United States | 1974 | 1974 | Home venue for half of the team's matches |

== 1974 roster ==
The Toronto-Buffalo Royals roster for the 1974 season was

- (Netherlands) Tom Okker, Player-Coach
- (United States) Mike Estep
- (Australia) Jan O'Neill
- (United States) Wendy Overton
- (South Africa) Laura Rossouw

== See also ==
- World TeamTennis
- 1974 World Team Tennis season
