= Baltimore Banners =

Defunct tennis team in Maryland, US

- Sport: Team tennis
- Founded: May 22, 1973
- Folded: February 1, 1975
- League: World TeamTennis
- Division: Eastern
- Based in: Baltimore, Maryland
- Stadium: Baltimore Civic Center
- Colors: Red, White, Blue
- Owner: Howard Fine, Gerald Klauber, Joseph Rivkin, Robert E. Bradley, Jr.
- Head coach: Don Candy
- Championships: None
- Division titles: None
- Playoff berths: None

The Baltimore Banners were a charter franchise of World Team Tennis (WTT) founded in 1974. The Banners lasted only one season but made a big splash by signing Jimmy Connors to a contract for $100,000 which obligated Connors to play in 22 of their 44 matches. Despite the presence of Connors, the Banners had 16 wins and 28 losses, and finished in third place in the Atlantic Section missing the playoffs. The Banners were contracted by WTT on February 1, 1975.

== Team history ==
The Banners were founded as WTT's charter franchise for Phoenix, Arizona in 1973, by Gary Davidson. Before the team ever had a name in Phoenix, Davidson sold it to Howard Fine, Gerald Klauber, Joseph Rivkin and Robert E. Bradley Jr. The new owners relocated the team to Baltimore, Maryland with a plan to have it play its home matches at the Baltimore Civic Center starting with the league's inaugural season in 1974 season and name it the Baltimore Banners.

The first 10 draft choices in the WTT inaugural draft made by what was at that time still the Phoenix franchise were

Round	No.	Overall	Player chosen
1	4	4	Jimmy Connors
2	13	29	Betty Stöve
3	4	36	Janet Newberry
4	13	61	Bob Carmichael
5	4	68	Barry Phillips-Moore
6	13	93	Janice Metcalf
7	4	100	Joyce Williams
8	13	125	Dick Crealy
9	4	132	Lost draft choice
10	13	157	Joaquín Loyo Mayo

The first match in Banners history was a 35–20 home victory against the Hawaii Leis on May 8, 1975. The Banners started the season strong and had a record of 5–3 after eight matches. However, after a quarter of the season had passed, the Banners lost 23 of their final 33 matches to finish with 16 wins and 28 losses, third place in the Atlantic Section.

Banners superstar Jimmy Connors had the highest game-winning percentage in men's singles for the 1974 WTT season. Connors was not allowed to participate in the 1974 French Open due to his association with WTT. His exclusion from the French Open denied him the opportunity to become the first male player since Rod Laver to win all four Major singles titles in a calendar year.

The Banners struggled mightily to draw fans at home. Only 761 people showed up for their second home match of the season. The attendance for their final home match of the season was just 1,065.

At the WTT owners meeting on February 1, 1975, each team was required to post a $500,000 letter of credit. The Banners failed to do so and were contracted by WTT. A dispersal draft was conducted to distribute the players among the remaining teams in the league.

== Roster ==
- (Australia) Don Candy, Player-Coach
- (Australia) Bob Carmichael
- (United States) Jimmy Connors
- (United Kingdom) Joyce Hume
- (United States) Kathy Kuykendall
- (United States) Audrey Morse
- (India) Jay Mukerjea
- (Netherlands) Betty Stöve

Jimmy Connors was the only Banners player to have been enshrined in the International Tennis Hall of Fame.

== See also ==
- World TeamTennis
- 1974 World Team Tennis season
