= New York Apples =

Team tennis franchise

- Sport: Team tennis
- Founded: May 22, 1973
- Folded: 1978
- League: World TeamTennis
- Division: Eastern
- Team history: New York Sets; 1974–1976; New York Apples; 1977–1978
- Based in: New York, New York
- Stadium: Nassau Veterans Memorial Coliseum (Capacity: 16,170); Madison Square Garden (Capacity: 17,812); Felt Forum (Capacity: 3,773)
- Colors: Brunswick Green, Imperial Red
- Owner: Sol Berg
- President: Sol Berg
- Head coach: Fred Stolle
- General manager: Ella Musolino
- Championships: 2 – 1976, 1977
- Division titles: 2 – 1976, 1977
- Playoff berths: 4 – 1975, 1976, 1977, 1978
- Broadcasters: WPIX-TV Channel 11; MSG; Home Box Office; WVNJ-AM 620

The New York Apples were a charter franchise of World Team Tennis (WTT). The team was founded by Jerry Saperstein, who sold it to New York businessman Sol Berg during its inaugural 1974 season. The team was originally known as the New York Sets to match the names of other successful New York sports teams including the New York Mets baseball team, the New York Jets football team, and the New York Nets basketball team. They won the 1976 WTT championship under that name led by Billie Jean King. Prior to the 1977 season, the defending champion Sets held a contest to choose a new name for the team, and Apples was selected. With their new name, the Apples produced the same results winning their second consecutive WTT title in 1977. On October 27, 1978, Berg folded the Apples after their fifth season. WTT suspended operations of the league shortly thereafter.

== Franchise history ==
=== Inaugural season ===
New York Sets logo used from 1974 to 1976.

On May 7, 1974, the Sets lost their inaugural match on their home court at the Nassau Veterans Memorial Coliseum in the hamlet of Uniondale in the town of Hempstead, New York to the Hawaii Leis, 29–25.

After opening the season with two losses at home, the Sets got their first victory in franchise history on the road beating the Cleveland Nets, 31–30, on May 12, 1974. Following the win over the Nets, the Sets lost 10 straight matches to fall to 1–12. The Sets finished the season in last place in the Atlantic Section with a record of 15 wins and 29 losses.

== See also ==
- World TeamTennis
- New York Sets - Previous NY Team
- New York Sportimes - Successor NY Team
- New York Empire - Current NY Team
