= Los Angeles Strings (1974–1978) =

World Team Tennis franchise

- Founded: May 22, 1973
- League: World Team Tennis; TeamTennis
- Team history: Los Angeles Strings (1974–1978); Los Angeles Strings (1981–1993)
- Arena: The Forum
- Owner: Jerry Buss
- Championships: 1978

The Los Angeles Strings were a team tennis franchise in World Team Tennis. They were owned by Jerry Buss. The Strings played their home matches at the Los Angeles Memorial Sports Arena in 1974, before moving to The Forum in Inglewood, California for the 1975 season. The Strings featured Chris Evert as a player and Ilie Năstase as the coach on their 1978 WTT championship team.

== See also ==
- Los Angeles Strings - Current team
- World TeamTennis
