= 2017 San Diego Aviators season =

Record
- 2017 record: 7 wins, 4 losses
- Home record: 4 wins, 1 loss
- Road record: 3 wins, 3 losses
- Games won–lost: 215–207

Team info
- Owner(s): Fred Luddy (majority); Jack McGrory (minority)
- General manager: Jim Ault
- Coach: John Lloyd; Jim Ault (assistant)
- Stadium: Omni La Costa Resort and Spa (capacity: 2,100)

The 2017 San Diego Aviators season is the 23rd season of the franchise in World TeamTennis (WTT) and its fourth playing in San Diego County, California.

== Season recap ==
=== Outreach to Chargers fans ===
After the San Diego Chargers announced that the team would move to Los Angeles for the 2017 NFL season, the Aviators offered a 30% discount on season ticket packages for a limited time in the hopes of attracting disaffected Chargers fans. "We are San Diego sports fans and are so disappointed with the Chargers leaving we decided we had to do something," said Aviators general manager Jim Ault. "The Aviators are the only professional sports team to win a championship for San Diego, and we would never leave America’s Finest City!"

=== Drafts ===
Because the 2016 WTT season schedule conflicted with the 2016 Olympics, teams were permitted to protect players who were eligible for protection in the 2016 draft based on playing for the team in 2015 (or 2014 and missing the 2015 season due to injury), went undrafted in the 2016 draft and did not participate in the league in 2016.

The Aviators did not make any selections and left James Blake and Madison Keys unprotected at the 2017 WTT Marquee Draft.

At the 2017 WTT Roster Draft, the Aviators protected Shelby Rogers, 2016 WTT Finals Most Valuable Player Raven Klaasen and Darija Jurak. In the third round of the draft, the Aviators left 2016 WTT Male Most Valuable Player Ryan Harrison unprotected and instead protected Klaasen's established doubles partner, Rajeev Ram. Taylor Fritz, Chanelle Scheepers and Květa Peschke, the final remaining player who played for the franchise when it was known as the New York Sportimes, were all left unprotected.

=== Harrison returns, and Aviators sign Broady ===
On May 27, 2017, the Aviators announced that they had re-signed 2016 WTT Male Most Valuable Player Ryan Harrison as a wildcard player.

On July 9, 2017, the Aviators announced that they had signed Naomi Broady as a substitute player. In 2016, Broady was tied with her Philadelphia Freedoms teammate Fabrice Martin for the best winning percentage in the league in mixed doubles.

=== Aviators sign Vandeweghe and Philippoussis ===
On July 20, 2017, the Aviators announced that they had signed San Diego County resident Coco Vandeweghe as a wildcard player.

On July 22, 2017, the Aviators announced that they had signed Mark Philippoussis as a substitute player.

== Event chronology ==
- February 16, 2017: The Aviators left James Blake and Madison Keys unprotected at the WTT Marquee Draft.
- March 14, 2017: The Aviators protected Shelby Rogers, Raven Klaasen and Darija Jurak, protected Rajeev Ram as part of an established doubles team and left Ryan Harrison, Taylor Fritz, Chanelle Scheepers and Květa Peschke unprotected.
- May 27, 2017: The Aviators re-signed Ryan Harrison as a wildcard player.
- July 9, 2017: The Aviators signed Naomi Broady as a substitute player.
- July 20, 2017: The Aviators signed Coco Vandeweghe as a wildcard player.
- July 22, 2017: The Aviators signed Mark Philippoussis as a substitute player.

== Draft picks ==
As 2016 WTT champions, the Aviators had the last selection in each of the league's drafts.

=== Marquee Draft ===
The Aviators did not select any players at the WTT Marquee Draft.

=== Roster Draft ===
The table below summarizes the selection made by the Aviators at the 2017 WTT Roster Draft.

| Round | No. | Overall | Player chosen | Prot? | Notes |
|---|---|---|---|---|---|
| 1 | 6 | 6 | (United States) Shelby Rogers | Y | Exempt |
| 2 | 6 | 12 | (South Africa) Raven Klaasen | Y | |
| 3 | 6 | 18 | (United States) Rajeev Ram | Y | Exempt; doubles protection |
| 4 | 6 | 24 | (Croatia) Darija Jurak | Y | |
| 5 | 6 | 30 | Pass | – | |

== Match log ==
=== Regular season ===
Legend
| Aviators Win | Aviators Loss |
Home team in CAPS

| Match | Date | Venue and location | Result and details | Record |
|---|---|---|---|---|
| 1 | July 16 | Omni La Costa Resort and Spa; Carlsbad, California | SAN DIEGO AVIATORS 17, Orange County Breakers 14 * XD: Ken Skupski/Andreja Klepač (Breakers) 5, Raven Klaasen/Darija Jurak (Aviators) 1 * WD: Andreja Klepač/Maria Sharapova (Breakers) 5, Darija Jurak/Shelby Rogers (Aviators) 1 * MD: Ryan Harrison/Raven Klaasen (Aviators) 5, Teymuraz Gabashvili/Ken Skupski (Breakers) 1 * WS: Shelby Rogers (Aviators) 5, Maria Sharapova (Breakers) 3 * MS: Ryan Harrison (Aviators) 5, Teymuraz Gabashvili (Breakers) 0 | 1–0 |
| 2 | July 18 | Omni La Costa Resort and Spa; Carlsbad, California | SAN DIEGO AVIATORS 18, Springfield Lasers 17 * MD: Ryan Harrison/Raven Klaasen (Aviators) 5, Benjamin Becker/Jean-Julien Rojer (Lasers) 1 * WS: Francesca Schiavone (Lasers) 5, Shelby Rogers (Aviators) 2 * XD: Jean-Julien Rojer/Abigail Spears (Lasers) 5, Raven Klaasen/Darija Jurak (Aviators) 1 * WD: Darija Jurak/Shelby Rogers (Aviators) 5, Francesca Schiavone/Abigail Spears (Lasers) 4 * MS: Ryan Harrison (Aviators) 5, Benjamin Becker (Lasers) 2 | 2–0 |
| 3 | July 20 | Kastles Stadium at the Charles E. Smith Center; Washington, District of Columbia | WASHINGTON KASTLES 23, San Diego Aviators 16 * MS: Ryan Harrison (Aviators) 5, Frances Tiafoe (Kastles) 4 * WD: Darija Jurak/Shelby Rogers (Aviators) 5, Madison Brengle/Anastasia Rodionova (Kastles) 4 * XD: Anastasia Rodionova/Mike Bryan (Kastles) 5, Darija Jurak/Ryan Harrison (Aviators) 2 *** Mike Bryan substituted for Bob Bryan at 1–0 *** Ryan Harrison substituted for Raven Klaasen at 2–4 * WS: Madison Brengle (Kastles) 5, Shelby Rogers (Aviators) 2 * MD: Bob Bryan/Mike Bryan (Kastles) 5, Ryan Harrison/Raven Klaasen (Aviators) 2 | 2–1 |
| 4 | July 21 | Mediacom Stadium at Cooper Tennis Complex; Springfield, Missouri | San Diego Aviators 24, SPRINGFIELD LASERS 16 (extended play) * XD: Darija Jurak/Raven Klaasen (Aviators) 5, Anna-Lena Grönefeld/Jean-Julien Rojer (Lasers) 3 * WD: Allie Kiick/Anna-Lena Grönefeld (Lasers) 5, Darija Jurak/Shelby Rogers (Aviators) 4 * MD: Ryan Harrison/Raven Klaasen (Aviators) 5, Jack Sock/Jean-Julien Rojer (Lasers) 3 * WS: Shelby Rogers (Aviators) 5, Allie Kiick (Lasers) 0 * MS: Jack Sock (Lasers) 5, Ryan Harrison (Aviators) 4 * EP – MS: Ryan Harrison (Aviators) 1, Jack Sock (Lasers) 0 | 3–1 |
| 5 | July 22 | Omni La Costa Resort and Spa; Carlsbad, California | Springfield Lasers 22, SAN DIEGO AVIATORS 20 (extended play) * MD: Raven Klaasen/Mark Philippoussis (Aviators) 5, Benjamin Becker/Jean-Julien Rojer (Lasers) 2 * WS: Julia Boserup (Lasers) 5, Shelby Rogers (Aviators) 2 * MS: Benjamin Becker (Lasers) 5, Mark Philippoussis (Aviators) 1 * WD: Julia Boserup/Anna-Lena Grönefeld (Lasers) 5, Darija Jurak/Shelby Rogers (Aviators) 3 * XD: Darija Jurak/Raven Klaasen (Aviators) 5, Anna-Lena Grönefeld/Jean-Julien Rojer (Lasers) 4 * EP – XD: Darija Jurak/Raven Klaasen (Aviators) 4, Anna-Lena Grönefeld/Jean-Julien Rojer (Lasers) 1 | 3–2 |
| 6 | July 23 | Omni La Costa Resort and Spa; Carlsbad, California | SAN DIEGO AVIATORS 21, New York Empire 16 * WD: Shelby Rogers/Darija Jurak (Aviators) 5, Kirsten Flipkens/Maria Sanchez (Empire) 4 * WS: Shelby Rogers (Aviators) 5, Kirsten Flipkens (Empire) 2 * MS: Marcus Willis (Empire) 5, Mark Philippoussis (Aviators) 1 * MD: Mark Philippoussis/Raven Klaasen (Aviators) 5, Marcus Willis/Neal Skupski (Empire) 3 * XD: Raven Klaasen/Darija Jurak (Aviators) 5, Marcus Willis/Kirsten Flipkens (Empire) 2 | 4–2 |
| 7 | July 24 | Breakers Stadium at the Palisades Tennis Club; Newport Beach, California | ORANGE COUNTY BREAKERS 22, San Diego Aviators 19 * WD: Maria Sharapova/Andreja Klepač (Breakers) 5, Shelby Rogers/Darija Jurak (Aviators) 2 * WS: Maria Sharapova (Breakers) 5, Shelby Rogers (Aviators) 3 * MD: Rajeev Ram/Raven Klaasen (Aviators) 5, Steve Johnson/Ken Skupski (Breakers) 3 * XD: Raven Klaasen/Darija Jurak (Aviators) 5, Ken Skupski/Andreja Klepač (Breakers) 4 * MS: Steve Johnson (Breakers) 5, Rajeev Ram (Aviators) 4 | 4–3 |
| 8 | July 25 | Omni La Costa Resort and Spa; Carlsbad, California | SAN DIEGO AVIATORS 22, Orange County Breakers 19 * MD: Ken Skupski/Teymuraz Gabashvili (Breakers) 5, Rajeev Ram/Raven Klaasen (Aviators) 4 * WD: Coco Vandeweghe/Shelby Rogers (Aviators) 5, Yanina Wickmayer/Andreja Klepač (Breakers) 3 * MS: Teymuraz Gabashvili (Breakers) 5, Rajeev Ram (Aviators) 3 * WS: Coco Vandeweghe (Aviators) 5, Yanina Wickmayer (Breakers) 4 * XD: Raven Klaasen/Coco Vandeweghe (Aviators) 5, Ken Skupski/Andreja Klepač (Breakers) 2 | 5–3 |
| 9 | July 27 | Mediacom Stadium at Cooper Tennis Complex; Springfield, Missouri | SPRINGFIELD LASERS 22, San Diego Aviators 16 * MS: Rajeev Ram (Aviators) 5, Benjamin Becker (Lasers) 3 * WD: Sorana Cîrstea/Anna-Lena Grönefeld (Lasers) 5, Naomi Broady/Darija Jurak (Aviators) 3 * MD: Raven Klaasen/Rajeev Ram (Aviators) 5, Benjamin Becker/Jean-Julien Rojer (Lasers) 4 * XD: Anna-Lena Grönefeld/Jean-Julien Rojer (Lasers) 5, Darija Jurak/Raven Klaasen (Aviators) 1 * WS: Sorana Cîrstea (Lasers) 5, Naomi Broady (Aviators) 2 | 5–4 |
| 10 | July 28 | USTA Billie Jean King National Tennis Center; New York City, New York | San Diego Aviators 21, NEW YORK EMPIRE 18 * MS: Rajeev Ram (Aviators) 5, Mardy Fish (Empire) 3 * XD: Darija Jurak/Raven Klaasen (Aviators) 5, Kirsten Flipkens/Neal Skupski (Empire) 2 *** Kirsten Flipkens substituted for Eugenie Bouchard at 1–3 * MD: Raven Klaasen/Rajeev Ram (Aviators) 5, Mardy Fish/Neal Skupski (Empire) 4 * WD: Kirsten Flipkens/Maria Sanchez (Empire) 5, Naomi Broady/Darija Jurak (Aviators) 1 * WS: Naomi Broady (Aviators) 5, Eugenie Bouchard (Empire) 4 | 6–4 |
| 11 | July 29 | Michael J. Hagan Arena; Philadelphia, Pennsylvania | San Diego Aviators 21, PHILADELPHIA FREEDOMS 18 (extended play) * MD: Darian King/Fabrice Martin (Freedoms) 5, Raven Klaasen/Rajeev Ram (Aviators) 2 * WD: Naomi Broady/Darija Jurak (Aviators) 5, Sloane Stephens/Taylor Townsend (Freedoms) 2 * MS: Rajeev Ram (Aviators) 5, Darian King (Freedoms) 3 * WS: Naomi Broady (Aviators) 5, Taylor Townsend (Freedoms) 2 * XD: Taylor Townsend/Fabrice Martin (Freedoms) 5, Darija Jurak/Raven Klaasen (Aviators) 3 * EP – XD: Darija Jurak/Raven Klaasen (Aviators) 1, Taylor Townsend/Fabrice Martin (Freedoms) 1 | 7–4 |
| 12 | July 31 | Breakers Stadium at the Palisades Tennis Club; Newport Beach, California | San Diego Aviators at ORANGE COUNTY BREAKERS | |
| 13 | August 1 | Omni La Costa Resort and Spa; Carlsbad, California | Philadelphia Freedoms at SAN DIEGO AVIATORS | |
| 14 | August 2 | Omni La Costa Resort and Spa; Carlsbad, California | Washington Kastles at SAN DIEGO AVIATORS | |

== Team personnel ==
=== Players and coaches ===
- (United Kingdom) John Lloyd, Coach
- (United Kingdom) Naomi Broady
- (United States) Ryan Harrison
- (Croatia) Darija Jurak
- (South Africa) Raven Klaasen
- (Australia) Mark Philippoussis
- (United States) Rajeev Ram
- (United States) Shelby Rogers
- (United States) Coco Vandeweghe

=== Front office ===
- Fred Luddy, Principal Owner
- Jack McGrory, Minority Owner
- Jim Ault, General Manager

== Transactions ==
- February 16, 2017: The Aviators left James Blake and Madison Keys unprotected at the WTT Marquee Draft.
- March 14, 2017: The Aviators protected Shelby Rogers, Raven Klaasen and Darija Jurak, protected Rajeev Ram as part of an established doubles team and left Ryan Harrison, Taylor Fritz, Chanelle Scheepers and Květa Peschke unprotected.
- May 27, 2017: The Aviators re-signed Ryan Harrison as a wildcard player.
- July 9, 2017: The Aviators signed Naomi Broady as a substitute player.
- July 20, 2017: The Aviators signed Coco Vandeweghe as a wildcard player.
- July 22, 2017: The Aviators signed Mark Philippoussis as a substitute player.

== See also ==
- Sports in San Diego
