= 2017 New York Empire season =

- World TeamTennis: 3rd place

Record
- 2017 record: 7 wins, 7 losses
- Home record: 4 wins, 3 losses
- Road record: 3 wins, 4 losses
- Games won–lost: 279–290

Team info
- Owner(s): NY TeamTennis LLC represented by Michael Coakley
- General manager: Michele Cope
- Coach: Gigi Fernández
- Stadium: USTA Billie Jean King National Tennis Center (capacity: 2,800)

The 2017 New York Empire season was the second season of the franchise in World TeamTennis (WTT). The Empire finished third in WTT with a record of 7 wins and 7 losses.

== Season recap ==
=== Marquee Draft, a new home court and a new general manager ===
The Empire had the first selection in each round of WTT's 2017 drafts due to finishing the 2016 season in sixth place. The Empire traded the first overall selection in the Marquee Draft to the Springfield Lasers for the second overall pick and undisclosed consideration. The Lasers used that pick to select Jack Sock. With the second selection in the first round, the Empire chose Eugenie Bouchard and left Andy Roddick unprotected. In the second round, the Empire selected John Isner, who had been left unprotected by the Lasers. The Empire's third round selection was Mardy Fish, who had been left unprotected by the Washington Kastles.

After playing its inaugural season at Forest Hills Stadium, the Empire announced at the draft that its 2017 home matches would be played on Court 17 at the USTA Billie Jean King National Tennis Center in Flushing, Queens, New York City. The stadium has seating for 2,800 fans and is easily accessible by public transportation. Parking is available on premises. The Empire also introduced its new general manager, Michele Cope, who said "Court 17 is a great showcase court for New York Empire matches. Fans will be close to great professional team competition, and also enjoy a fan-friendly and entertaining atmosphere."

=== Gigi Fernández named new head coach ===
On March 1, the Empire named International Tennis Hall of Famer Gigi Fernández as the team's new head coach, replacing Patrick McEnroe. Fernández said, "This is going to be a fantastic summer for the New York Empire with a really strong team that already includes John [Isner], Genie [Bouchard] and Mardy [Fish]. We'll finalize the remainder of the roster very soon, and then it's time to start thinking about match strategy. I really can't wait to work with these amazing athletes." McEnroe had recently taken a position with Sportime NY as co-director of the John McEnroe Tennis Academy.

=== A third-place finish ===
The Empire finished its second season in the league with a 7–7 record, more than tripling its win total from 2016. The team started off the season on July 16 with a thrilling home win over the Philadelphia Freedoms, which marquee player John Isner clinched with a 5–2 final set win in men's singles over Donald Young. The next night, the Empire traveled to Philadelphia and beat the Freedoms once again, with Mardy Fish taking down Young in a winner-take-all tiebreak in the final set.

Having already achieved last season's win total after two matches, the Empire looked to keep the momentum going in Washington. Fish overcame a two-game deficit to push the match into a deciding supertiebreak, but came up short against Frances Tiafoe to hand the Empire its first loss of the season. After a 25–13 loss at home to Philadelphia, the Empire were able to get back above .500 by winning at home against the Orange County Breakers in a match that was moved indoors due to rain.

The team then went on the road for a week, losing two matches in California before beating both Philadelphia and Washington. It returned home on July 27 with a 5–4 record, but despite the presence of Eugenie Bouchard, it was again swept by the Breakers and San Diego Aviators. Knowing that it would need to win the rest of its matches to have a chance at qualifying for the WTT Finals, the Empire had a convincing 25–18 win over Washington before closing out its home schedule with a memorable win over the Springfield Lasers, in which Marcus Willis saved a match point and defeated Benjamin Becker in a final-set tiebreak.

At 7–6, the Empire's playoff hopes were slim, but still alive, as the team traveled to Springfield to play its final match of the season. Needing a win and losses from both the Aviators and Breakers, the Empire won two of the first three sets. The match was eventually decided in a Supertiebreak, where New York's Kirsten Flipkens lost to Sorana Cîrstea, ending the Empire's playoff hopes but at the same time clinching the franchise's first-ever Top 3 finish. Orange County and San Diego’ s subsequent wins meant that the Empire finished the season 2 matches out of first place.

== Event chronology ==
- February 16, 2017: The Empire selected Eugenie Bouchard, John Isner and Mardy Fish and left Andy Roddick unprotected at the WTT Marquee Player Draft.
- February 16, 2017: The Empire announced that its home matches would be played at the USTA Billie Jean King National Tennis Center starting with the 2017 season.
- February 16, 2017: The Empire introduced Michele Cope as the team's new general manager.
- March 1, 2017: The Empire named Gigi Fernández the team's new head coach, replacing Patrick McEnroe.

== Draft picks ==
Since the Empire had the worst record in WTT in 2016, it had the first selection in each round of the league's drafts.

=== Marquee Player Draft ===
The Empire traded the first overall selection in the Marquee Player Draft to the Springfield Lasers in exchange for the second overall pick and undisclosed consideration. The selections made by the Empire are shown in the table below.

Round	No.	Overall	Player chosen	Prot?
1	2	2	(Canada) Eugenie Bouchard	N
2	1	7	(United States) John Isner	N
3	1	13	(United States) Mardy Fish	N

== Statistics ==
Players are listed in order of their game-winning percentage provided they played in at least 40% of the Empire's games in that event, which is the WTT minimum for qualification for league leaders in individual statistical categories.

Men's singles

Player	GP	GW	GL	PCT
Mardy Fish	71	31	40	.437
John Isner	7	5	2	.714
Marcus Willis	44	25	19	.568
Total	122	61	61	.500

Women's singles

Player	GP	GW	GL	PCT
Kirsten Flipkens	84	43	41	.512
Eugenie Bouchard	16	9	7	.563
Maria Sanchez	3	1	2	.333
Total	103	53	50	.515

Men's doubles

Player	GP	GW	GL	PCT
Neal Skupski	122	61	61	.500
Mardy Fish	71	35	36	.493
Marcus Willis	42	22	20	.524
John Isner	9	4	5	.444
Total	122	61	61	.500

Women's doubles

Player	GP	GW	GL	PCT
Maria Sanchez	100	52	54	.491
Kirsten Flipkens	110	52	58	.473
Eugenie Bouchard	4	0	4	.000
Total	110	52	58	.473

Mixed doubles

Player	GP	GW	GL	PCT
Neal Skupski	97	47	50	.485
Kirsten Flipkens	108	51	57	.472
John Isner	8	3	5	.375
Marcus Willis	7	2	5	.286
Eugenie Bouchard	4	1	3	.250
Total	112	52	60	.464

Team totals

Event	GP	GW	GL	PCT
Men's singles	122	61	61	.500
Women's singles	103	53	50	.515
Men's doubles	122	61	61	.500
Women's doubles	110	52	58	.473
Mixed doubles	112	52	60	.464
Total	569	279	290	.490

== Transactions ==
- February 16, 2017: The Empire selected Eugenie Bouchard, John Isner and Mardy Fish and left Andy Roddick unprotected at the WTT Marquee Player Draft.

== See also ==
- Sports in New York City
