= 2017 World TeamTennis season =

- League: World TeamTennis
- Sport: Team tennis
- Duration: July 16 – August 5, 2017
- Matches: Regular season: 42 (14 for each team); Postseason: 1
- Teams: 6
- TV partner(s): ESPN2; ESPN3; Tennis Channel; Altitude Sports and Entertainment; Comcast SportsNet affiliates Mediacom Connections; MSG

World TeamTennis Player Draft
- Top draft pick: (United States) Jack Sock
- Picked by: Springfield Lasers

Regular season
- Top seed: Orange County Breakers
- Season MVP: (Russia) Teymuraz Gabashvili (Male) (Slovenia) Andreja Klepač (Female)

World TeamTennis Final
- Venue: Omni La Costa Resort and Spa; Carlsbad, California
- Champions: Orange County Breakers
- Runners-up: San Diego Aviators
- Finals MVP: (Russia) Teymuraz Gabashvili

World TeamTennis seasons
- ← 2016 2018 →

The 2017 World TeamTennis season was the 42nd season of the top professional team tennis league in the United States. Pursuant to a sponsorship agreement with Mylan N.V., the official name of the league was Mylan World TeamTennis in 2017.

The Orange County Breakers defeated the San Diego Aviators in the WTT Finals to win the King Trophy as WTT champions.

== Competition format ==
The 2017 World TeamTennis season included six teams. Each team played a 14-match regular-season schedule with seven home and seven away matches. The top two teams in the regular season qualified for the World TeamTennis Final at Omni La Costa Resort & Spa in Carlsbad, California, the home court of the San Diego Aviators. The higher seed was treated as the "home" team in the WTT Final and had the right to determine the order of play. The winner of the WTT Final was awarded the King Trophy.

== League business ==
On March 13, 2017, WTT announced that Billie Jean King had sold most of her majority ownership interest in the league to Mark Ein, founder and owner of the Washington Kastles, Fred Luddy, owner of the San Diego Aviators, and LionTree Partners, a merchant banking firm. Ein was named Chairman of WTT, and Ilana Kloss was to remain CEO and Commissioner of the league through the 2017 season. "After 42 seasons of World TeamTennis, Ilana and I feel this is the time to pass the baton to Mark Ein and Fred Luddy and entrust the legacy of WTT as an innovative force in tennis to them and their team", said King. "I will continue to be part of the league as a minority owner and as the owner of the Philadelphia Freedoms, and I am confident the league will continue to grow and prosper under Mark and Fred's leadership."

== Drafts ==
The order in which franchises selected was based on the results the teams achieved in 2016, with weaker teams selecting earlier and stronger teams selecting later. The four nonplayoff teams selected first followed by the WTT Final loser and then the WTT champion. Because the 2016 WTT season schedule conflicted with the 2016 Olympics, teams were permitted to protect players who were eligible for protection in the 2016 draft based on playing for the team in 2015 (or 2014 and missing the 2015 season due to injury), went undrafted in the 2016 draft and did not participate in the league in 2016.

=== Marquee Draft ===
WTT conducted its 2017 Marquee Draft on February 16, in New York City. Each team could protect up to three marquee players or doubles teams, if they appeared in a match for the team in 2016, or qualified for protection under the special 2017 rule based on eligibility for protection in 2016. The selections made are shown in the tables below.

First round

No.	Team	Player chosen	Prot?	Notes
1	Springfield Lasers (Note: The New York Empire traded the first pick in the Marquee Draft to the Springfield Lasers in exchange for the second pick and undisclosed consideration.)	(United States) Jack Sock	N	
2	New York Empire	(Canada) Eugenie Bouchard	N	
3	Philadelphia Freedoms	(United States) Sloane Stephens	N	
4	Washington Kastles	(Switzerland) Martina Hingis	Y	
5	Orange County Breakers	Pass	-	
6	San Diego Aviators	Pass	–	

Second round

No.	Team	Player chosen	Prot?	Notes
1	New York Empire	(United States) John Isner	N	
2	Springfield Lasers	Pass	-	
3	Philadelphia Freedoms	(United States) Andy Roddick	N	
4	Washington Kastles	(United States) Venus Williams	Y (Note: The player was protected based on being a member of the team in 2015, and not being drafted or participating in WTT in 2016, under special rule in effect for the 2017 draft.)	
5	Orange County Breakers	Pass	-	
6	San Diego Aviators	Pass	–	

Third round

No.	Team	Player chosen	Prot?	Notes
1	New York Empire	(United States) Mardy Fish	N	
2	Springfield Lasers	Pass	-	
3	Philadelphia Freedoms	Pass	–	
4	Washington Kastles	(United States) Bob and Mike Bryan	Y	Doubles team
5	Orange County Breakers	Pass	-	
6	San Diego Aviators	Pass	–	

=== Roster Draft ===
WTT conducted its 2017 Roster Draft on March 14, in Indian Wells, California. Exempt, roster and substitute players who appeared in at least three matches for the team in 2016, could be protected. Teams could also protect players who qualified for protection based on match appearances in 2015, but were unable to play in 2016, due to injury. If a team selects a player who is part of an established doubles team (at least four tournaments played together in the 12 months prior to the draft), that team can protect the drafted player's doubles partner in the next round of the draft. Finally, teams could protect players who qualified for protection under the special 2017 rule based on eligibility for protection in 2016. Teams holding the right to protect players could trade those rights before or during the draft. If a team chooses a roster-exempt player, one who is not required to be a full-time member of the team, it is possible for a team to make four selections in the roster draft and not have two male and two female full-time players. In such cases, these teams are permitted to make selections in additional rounds of the roster draft until they have a complete roster. Teams that have two male and two female full-time players may select roster-exempt players in rounds past the fourth round. The selections made are shown in the tables below.

First round

No.	Team	Player chosen	Prot?	Notes
1	Philadelphia Freedoms (Note: The New York Empire traded the first pick in the first round of the Roster Draft to the Philadelphia Freedoms in exchange for the third pick in the second round and financial consideration.)	(Barbados) Darian King	N	
2	Springfield Lasers	(Netherlands) Jean-Julien Rojer	N	
3	Philadelphia Freedoms	(United States) Taylor Townsend	Y (Note: The player was protected based on being a member of the team in 2015, and not being drafted or participating in WTT in 2016, under special rule in effect for the 2017 draft.)	
4	Washington Kastles	(United States) Sam Querrey	Y	
5	Orange County Breakers	(Belgium) Yanina Wickmayer	N	
6	San Diego Aviators	(United States) Shelby Rogers	Y	Exempt

Second round

No.	Team	Player chosen	Prot?	Notes
1	New York Empire	(Belgium) Kirsten Flipkens	N	
2	Springfield Lasers	(Russia) Daria Kasatkina	N	
3	New York Empire	(United States) Maria Sanchez	N	
4	Washington Kastles	(Brazil) Bruno Soares	N	
5	Orange County Breakers	(New Zealand) Michael Venus	N	
6	San Diego Aviators	(South Africa) Raven Klaasen	Y	

Third round

No.	Team	Player chosen	Prot?	Notes
1	New York Empire	(Argentina) Guido Pella	N	
2	Springfield Lasers	(Germany) Benjamin Becker	N	
3	Philadelphia Freedoms	(France) Fabrice Martin	Y	
4	Washington Kastles	(United States) Madison Brengle	Y	
5	Orange County Breakers	(Slovenia) Andreja Klepač	N	
6	San Diego Aviators	(United States) Rajeev Ram	Y	Exempt; doubles protection

Fourth round

No.	Team	Player chosen	Prot?	Notes
1	New York Empire	Pass	–	
2	Springfield Lasers	(Netherlands) Michaëlla Krajicek	Y	
3	Philadelphia Freedoms	Pass	–	
4	Washington Kastles	(Australia) Anastasia Rodionova	Y	
5	Orange County Breakers	(Russia) Teymuraz Gabashvili	Y	
6	San Diego Aviators	(Croatia) Darija Jurak	Y	

Fifth round

No.	Team	Player chosen	Prot?	Notes
1	New York Empire	Pass	–	
2	Springfield Lasers	Pass	–	
3	Philadelphia Freedoms	(United States) Donald Young	Y	Exempt
4	Washington Kastles	Pass	-	
5	Orange County Breakers	Pass	–	
6	San Diego Aviators	Pass	-	

== Event chronology ==
=== Off-season ===
- February 16, 2017: WTT conducted its 2017 Marquee Draft.
- March 13, 2017: WTT announced that Billie Jean King had sold most of her majority ownership interest in the league to Mark Ein, Fred Luddy and LionTree Partners.
- March 14, 2017: WTT conducted its 2017 Roster Draft.

=== Regular season ===
- July 30, 2017: With a record of 4 wins and 8 losses, the Washington Kastles were eliminated from playoff contention, when they lost on the road to the New York Empire, 25–18.
- August 1, 2017: With a record of 6 wins and 7 losses, the Springfield Lasers were eliminated from playoff contention, when the Orange County Breakers defeated the Washington Kastles, 23–14.
- August 1, 2017: With a record of 6 wins and 7 losses, the Philadelphia Freedoms were eliminated from playoff contention, when they lost on the road to the San Diego Aviators, 21–18, in extended play.

== Standings ==
Reference:'

Pos	Team	MP	W	L	Pct	MB	GW	GL
1	Orange County Breakers	14	9	5	.643	0	302	242
2	San Diego Aviators	14	9	5	.643	0	275	266
3	New York Empire	14	7	7	.500	2	279	290
4	Springfield Lasers	14	7	7	.500	2	270	284
5	Philadelphia Freedoms	14	6	8	.429	3	270	282
6	Washington Kastles	14	4	10	.286	5	263	295

The top two teams qualified for the 2017 Mylan WTT Finals

Notes: Orange County and San Diego each won two of their four head-to-head matches. Orange County wins the tiebreaker on games won in head-to-head matches, 79–75. New York and Springfield each won one of their two head-to-head matches. New York wins the tiebreaker on games won in head-to-head matches, 41–39.

== Mylan WTT Finals ==
- The Orange County Breakers defeated the San Diego Aviators 22–18 to capture the King Trophy.

ORANGE COUNTY BREAKERS def. San Diego Aviators 22-18

Women's singles – Yanina Wickmayer (Breakers) def. Naomi Broady (Aviators) 5-2

Women's doubles – Naomi Broady\Darija Jurak (Aviators) def. Andreja Klepač\Yanina Wickmayer (Breakers) 5-3

Men's doubles – Teymuraz Gabashvili\Ken Skupski (Breakers) def. Raven Klaasen\Rajeev Ram (Aviators) 5-2

Mixed doubles – Raven Klaasen\Darija Jurak (Aviators) def. Ken Skupski\Andreja Klepač (Breakers) 5-4

Men's singles – Teymuraz Gabashvili (Breakers) def. Rajeev Ram (Aviators) 5-4

== Results table ==
Abbreviation and Color Key: New York Empire – NYE • Orange County Breakers – OCB • Philadelphia Freedoms – PHI San Diego Aviators – SDA • Springfield Lasers – SPR • Washington Kastles – WAS Win • Loss • Home • Away
Team	Match													
Team	1	2	3	4	5	6	7	8	9	10	11	12	13	14
New York Empire	PHI	PHI	WAS	PHI	OCB	OCB	SDA	PHI	WAS	OCB	SDA	WAS	SPR	SPR
New York Empire	20–18	21–20	23–24 (STB, 3–7)	13–25	23–21 (EP)	18–24 (EP)	16–21	25–18	20–19 (STB, 7–1)	16–22	18–21	25–18	21–18	20–21
Orange County Breakers	SDA	SPR	WAS	NYE	NYE	SPR	SDA	SDA	NYE	PHI	WAS	SDA	WAS	PHI
Orange County Breakers	14–17	23–15	15–22	21–23 (EP)	24–18 (EP)	25–10	22–19	19–22	22–16	21–22 (STB, 4–7)	24–14	24–17	23–14	25–13
Philadelphia Freedoms	NYE	NYE	NYE	SPR	WAS	WAS	WAS	NYE	SPR	OCB	SDA	SPR	SDA	OCB
Philadelphia Freedoms	18–20	20–21	25–13	21–18 (EP)	23–17 (EP)	20–18	15–20 (EP)	18–25	18–22 (EP)	22–21 (STB, 7–4)	18–21 (EP)	21–20	18–21 (EP)	13–25
San Diego Aviators	OCB	SPR	WAS	SPR	SPR	NYE	OCB	OCB	SPR	NYE	PHI	OCB	PHI	WAS
San Diego Aviators	17–14	18–17	16–23	24–16 (EP)	20–22 (EP)	21–16	19–22	22–19	16–22	21–18	21–18 (EP)	17–24	21–18 (EP)	22–17
Springfield Lasers	WAS	OCB	SDA	PHI	SDA	SDA	OCB	WAS	PHI	SDA	WAS	PHI	NYE	NYE
Springfield Lasers	24–20 (EP)	15–23	17–18	18–21 (EP)	16–24 (EP)	22–20 (EP)	10–25	23–21 (EP)	22–18 (EP)	22–16	22–16 (EP)	20–21	18–21	21–20
Washington Kastles	SPR	NYE	OCB	SDA	PHI	PHI	PHI	SPR	NYE	SPR	OCB	NYE	OCB	SDA
Washington Kastles	20–24 (EP)	24–23 (STB, 7–3)	22–15	23–16	17–23 (EP)	18–20	20–15 (EP)	21–23 (EP)	19–20 (STB, 1–7)	16–22 (EP)	14–24	18–25	14–23	17–22

== Television ==
The 2017 season was the final year of a four-year television rights contract between WTT and ESPN, Inc. The WTT Final was streamed live on ESPN3. ESPN2's live telecast of the WTT Final began at 9:00 pm PDT, one hour after the match's start time. ESPN3 streamed 11 regular-season matches live. Five of those matches were also televised live by the Tennis Channel and Comcast SportsNet affiliates. Matches carried live on the Tennis Channel were available on Mediacom's MC22 (Mediacom Connections) channel, which also provided live coverage of some matches involving the Springfield Lasers that were not aired nationally. Select matches streamed live by ESPN3 were rebroadcast by regional sports networks Altitude Sports and Entertainment, Comcast SportsNet affiliates, MC22 and MSG.

== Sponsorship ==
On December 8, 2014, WTT announced that its title-sponsorship agreement with Mylan N.V. was extended for two more years through the 2017 season. As part of its partnership with WTT, Mylan continued to sponsor events at which children met with WTT players and were introduced to tennis, charitable events and the Mylan Aces program which allows each team to select a local charity for which it can earn money donated by Mylan by recording the most aces in the league on a given day during the regular season.

== See also ==
- Team tennis
