= 2017 Orange County Breakers season =

World TeamTennis champions

Record
- 2017 record: 0 wins, 0 losses

Team info
- Owner(s): Eric Davidson
- General manager: Allen Hardison
- Coach: Rick Leach
- Stadium: Breakers Stadium at the Newport Beach Tennis Club (capacity: 1,250)

The 2017 Orange County Breakers season was the 15th season of the franchise in World TeamTennis (WTT) and its 13th season in Orange County, California, the second after returning from playing two seasons in Greater Austin, Texas as the Austin Aces.

== Season recap ==
=== New home venue ===
On January 31, 2017, the Breakers announced that the team would move its home matches to the Palisades Tennis Club in Newport Beach starting with the 2017 season. Breakers general manager Allen Hardison said, "We are very excited to once again team up with Palisades and bring the Breakers back to their first-ever home." The Breakers played their home matches at the Palisades Tennis Club from their inaugural season in 2003 through 2006. Club owner Ken Stuart said, "Our club has a great history with the Breakers and is no stranger to hosting large-scale professional tennis events. Palisades will offer Breakers fans one of the best settings to watch a Mylan WTT match, and we are certainly looking forward to having our club members and the Orange County tennis community here this summer." The Breakers will construct a new stadium with a seating capacity of 1,250 on top of the club's existing stadium court.

=== New ownership ===
On February 8, 2017, the Breakers announced that the franchise had been purchased by Laguna Beach businessman Eric Davidson. Davidson, the first local owner in the team's history, said "When I was first approached with this, I saw it as a great way to give back to a tennis community that has meant so much to me. My dad Gary was involved with World TeamTennis during its inception in 1973, so coming full circle now and owning the Breakers is really pretty neat. I look forward to putting a championship-caliber product on the court and providing our fans with a first-class environment to watch professional tennis." WTT CEO/Commissioner Ilana Kloss said, "From a league perspective, it is very important to have strong local ownership with someone who has a passion for tennis and the community. We couldn't be more pleased, as we have found all of that with Eric."

=== Drafts ===
As the 2016 WTT runner-up, the Breakers had the next-to-last (fifth) selection in each round of WTT's drafts. The Breakers did not make any selections in the Marquee Player Draft.

== Event chronology ==
- January 31, 2017: The Breakers announced that the team would play its home matches at the Palisades Tennis Club in Newport Beach, California starting with the 2017 season.
- February 8, 2017: The Breakers announced that Eric Davidson had purchased the franchise.

== See also ==
- Sports in Los Angeles
