= Super Sex (disambiguation) =

Super Sex, Supersex or Super-Sex may refer to:

- "Super Sex", a song on the album Yes by Morphine
- Super Sex (film), a 2016 American short comedy film
- Supersex, a 2024 Italian television miniseries released by Netflix
- The Super-Sex (film), a 1922 American silent comedy film based on the story Miles Brewster and the Super Sex by Frank R. Adams
