= 2017 Washington Kastles season =

Record
- 2017 record: 0 wins, 0 losses

Team info
- Owner(s): Mark Ein
- General manager: Kevin Wynne
- Coach: Murphy Jensen
- Captain: Leander Paes
- Stadium: Kastles Stadium at the Charles E. Smith Center (capacity: 3,212)

The 2017 Washington Kastles season will be the tenth season of the franchise in World TeamTennis (WTT).

== Season recap ==
=== Drafts ===
At the WTT Marquee Player Draft on February 16, 2017, the Kastles protected Martina Hingis, Venus Williams and Bob and Mike Bryan. Mardy Fish was left unprotected and was drafted by the New York Empire with the first pick of the third round.

== Event chronology ==
- February 16, 2017: The Kastles protected Martina Hingis, Venus Williams and Bob and Mike Bryan at the WTT Marquee Player Draft. The Kastles left Mardy Fish unprotected.

== Draft picks ==
After finishing third in WTT in 2016, the Kastles selected fourth in each round of WTT's drafts.

=== Marquee Player Draft ===
WTT conducted its 2017 Marquee Player Draft in New York City on February 16. The selections made by the Kastles are shown in the table below.

Round	No.	Overall	Player chosen	Prot?	Notes
1	4	4	(Switzerland) Martina Hingis	Y	
2	4	10	(United States) Venus Williams	Y	
3	4	16	(United States) Bob and Mike Bryan	Y	Doubles team

== See also ==
- Sports in Washington, D.C.
