= 2017 Philadelphia Freedoms season =

Tennis season

Record
- 2017 record: 6 wins, 8 losses

Team info
- Owner(s): Billie Jean King
- General manager: Barbara Perry
- Coach: Craig Kardon
- Stadium: Michael J. Hagan Arena (capacity: 3,500)

The 2017 Philadelphia Freedoms season was the 17th season of the franchise (in its current incarnation) in World TeamTennis (WTT).

== Season recap ==
=== New home venue ===
On January 24, 2017, the Freedoms announced they would play their 2017 home matches at the Michael J. Hagan Arena on the campus of St. Joseph's University in West Philadelphia. It will be the first WTT action in the city of Philadelphia, since the original Freedoms called the Spectrum their home in 1974. Team owner Billie Jean King said, "I came to see the arena here a few months ago, and I walked in, and I go, this is perfect for us, perfect size, it’s really beautiful, and it’s easy for public transportation."

=== Drafts ===
At the WTT Marquee Player Draft on February 16, 2017, the Freedoms selected Sloane Stephens and chose Andy Roddick, whom had been left unprotected by the New York Empire, in the second round.

=== Season ===
Led by 2017 US Open (tennis) champion Sloane Stephens, 2017 International Tennis Hall of Fame inductee Andy Roddick and returning fan favorite Donald Young (tennis), the Freedoms played competitively, going into the final weekend of the season in playoff contention. Led by returning championship-winning coach Craig Kardon, the 2017 squad also featured familiar faces like Taylor Townsend (tennis), in her third season with the Freedoms, and 2016 World TeamTennis Male Rookie of the Year Fabrice Martin, returning to dominate in men’s and mixed doubles for the second consecutive season. The 2017 season also featured the WTT debut of sensational rookie Darian King, the highest-ranked professional tennis player in the history of Barbados. Freedoms fans were thrilled by a visiting appearance from tennis great Venus Williams (Washington Kastles), who played in Philadelphia just weeks after reaching the final of the 2017 The Championships, Wimbledon.

== Event chronology ==
- January 24, 2017: The Freedoms announced that their 2017 home matches will be played at the Michael J. Hagan Arena on the campus of St. Joseph's University in Philadelphia.
- February 16, 2017: The Freedoms selected Sloane Stephens and Andy Roddick at the WTT Marquee Player Draft.

== Draft picks ==
After finishing fourth in WTT in 2016, the Freedoms selected third in each round of WTT's drafts.

=== Marquee Player Draft ===
WTT conducted its 2017 Marquee Player Draft on February 16, in New York City. The selections made by the Freedoms are shown in the table below.

Round	No.	Overall	Player chosen	Prot?
1	3	3	(United States) Sloane Stephens	N
2	3	9	(United States) Andy Roddick	N
3	3	12	Pass	–

== Transactions ==
- February 16, 2017: The Freedoms selected Sloane Stephens and Andy Roddick at the WTT Marquee Player Draft.

== See also ==
- Sports in Philadelphia
