= Super Sex (film) =

- Directed by: Matthew Modine
- Written by: Matthew Modine
- Produced by: Matthew Modine; Joe Toronto; Julio Macat; Adam Rackoff
- Starring: Kevin Nealon; Elizabeth Perkins; Ed Asner; Ruby Modine; Efren Ramirez
- Cinematography: Julio Macat
- Edited by: Jessie Marion
- Music by: Eddie Brown
- Production company: Cinco Dedos Peliculas
- Release date: April 15, 2016 (Tribeca)
- Running time: 7 minutes
- Language: English

Super Sex is a 2016 American short film comedy scripted and directed by Matthew Modine and produced by Cinco Dedos Peliculas.

== Plot ==
Super Sex tells the story of a pair of siblings (Kevin Nealon and Elizabeth Perkins) trying to figure out what to get their father (Ed Asner) for his 86th birthday. After going through a list of options, the pair opt for a gift their father will never forget...Super Sex! The brother and sister negotiate with a street prostitute (Ruby Modine) who agrees to give their 86-year-old father a night "he'll never forget".

== Cast ==
- Kevin Nealon as Dick
- Elizabeth Perkins as Jane
- Ed Asner as George
- Ruby Modine as Julie
- Efren Ramirez as Bodega Guy / Donut Guy / Street 'John'

== Production ==
=== Development ===
The idea of Super Sex came from a joke actor Eli Wallach told to Matthew Modine. The joke had a lasting impression on Modine. So much so that he felt the joke could be expanded, opened-up and made into funny short film. When Modine completed his screenplay he asked his daughter, actress and singer Ruby Modine, for her thoughts. Ruby loved the script and expressed interest in portraying Julie, the film's prostitute. Ruby gave her father ideas for other cast members, which included Kevin Nealon and Elizabeth Perkins. Once hired, Elizabeth Perkins recommended her husband, legendary cinematographer Julio Macat (Home Alone, Wedding Crashers) to shoot the film. Ruby and Matthew met with actor Efren Ramirez who agreed to play three roles in the film. Matthew, a great fan of Peter Sellers, felt Ramirez had the right comic touch to pull off what Sellers did so often and so brilliantly.

=== Filming ===
Filming of Super Sex took place in Los Angeles, CA over two days. The production crew employed several students from the New York Film Academy's Industry Lab, who worked on the film in an apprenticeship capacity. “When we began production, I wanted to involve students from the New York Film Academy. Jerry Sherlock was a dear friend and nothing made him more happy than when his students were involved with successful projects. I’m thrilled Super Sex is having its world premiere in the city Jerry loved and having students from NYFA participate.” said Modine.

The film was shot digitally using the Arri Alexa camera. The film's poster was designed by Celsius Brand Team.

== Release ==
On April 15, 2016 Super Sex had its world premiere at the Tribeca Film Festival in New York, NY.

"Super Sex" was acquired by ShortsHD and was included in their compilation "Stars in Shorts: No Ordinary Love", which was released theatrically on September 17, 2016.

=== Critical reception ===
Super Sex received positive reviews from critics and was considered one of the best films of the 2016 Tribeca Film festival. Filmmaker Magazine chose Super Sex as one of the eight short films to see at the Tribeca Film Festival. On Review Fix, the film was hailed as "one of the most enjoyable short films at the 2016 Tribeca Film Festival". The Sunday Guardian said "The sharp scripting is enhanced by what appears to be considerable improvisation on the part of veterans Nealon and Perkins, and a satiric element drifts in over the culture-clash angle Modine takes on the material. Super Sex demonstrates the programmers’ enthusiasm for a form (Short films) that doesn't get enough credit in the bigger festivals and, most importantly, showcases the filmmaking chops required to shape the enormity of life into ten-minute vignettes.” And Short and Sweet NYC called Super Sex the "best short of the festival."

== Film Festivals ==
| Festival | Status | Screening Dates | Awards/Accolades | Filmmakers In Attendance |
|---|---|---|---|---|
| Tribeca Film Festival | World Premiere | April 15, 20, 22, and 23, 2016 | Nominated for Best Narrative Short Film | Matthew Modine, Joe Toronto, Julio Macat, Adam Rackoff |
| New Media Film Festival | Los Angeles Premiere | June 7, 2016 | Winner Best Short | Joe Toronto |
| Greenwich International Film Festival | Connecticut Premiere | June 9-12th, 2016 | Official Selection | Adam Rackoff |
| Indie Street Film Festival | New Jersey Premiere | July 6-10th, 2016 | Official Selection | Adam Rackoff |
| Magna Graecia Film Festival | Italian Premiere | July 23-July 31, 2016 | Official Selection | Matthew Modine |
| Traverse City Film Festival | Michigan Premiere | July 26-July 31, 2016 | Official Selection | |
| Long Beach International Film Festival | | August 3-5th, 2016 | Official Selection | Adam Rackoff |
| Martha's Vineyard International Film Festival | | September 10, 2016 | Official Selection | |
| Big Eddy Film Festival | | September 16-18th, 2016 | Official Selection | Adam Rackoff |
| Movies at the Mill | Pennsylvania Premiere | September 24, 2016 | Official Selection | |
| Edmonton International Film Festival | Canadian Premiere | September 29-October 8, 2016 | Official Selection | |
| Tacoma Film Festival | | October 12, 2016 | Official Selection | |
| FilmLab Festival | | October 13-16th, 2016 | Official Selection | |
| La Costa Film Festival | | October 13-16th, 2016 | Official Selection | Joe Toronto |
| Washington West Film Festival | Washington D.C Premiere | October 19-26th, 2016 | Official Selection | Adam Rackoff, Ed Asner |
| Carmel International Film Festival | | October 19-23rd, 2016 | Official Selection | Matthew Modine, Ed Asner |
| Dublin International Film Festival | U.K Premiere | February 16-26rd, 2017 | Special Mention for International Short | |
| Spokane International Film Festival | Washington Premiere | January 27-February 5, 2017 | Official Selection | |
| Dakota Digital Film Festival | | March 31, 2017 | Official Selection | |
| Palm Springs International ShortFest | | June 20-26th, 2017 | Official Selection | Matthew Modine, Joe Toronto |
| LA Shorts International Film Festival | | August 2–10, 2017 | Official Selection | |
