= Elizabeth Perkins =

American actress (born 1960)

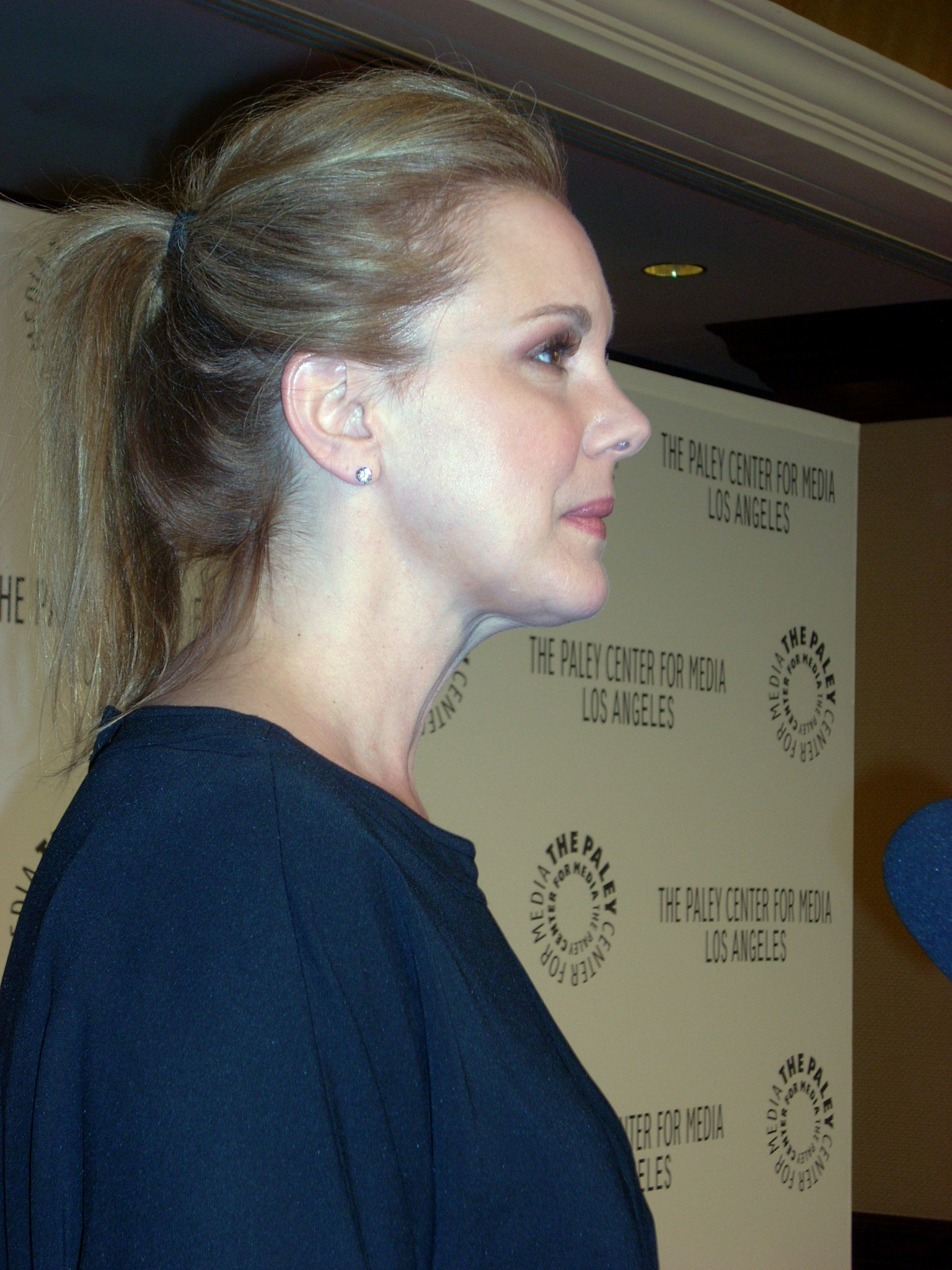
- Perkins in 2008
- Born: November 18, 1960 (age 65); New York City, U.S.
- Education: DePaul University
- Occupation: Actress
- Years active: 1984–present
- Spouses: Terry Kinney (m. 1984; div. 1988) Julio Macat (m. 2000)
- Children: 1

Elizabeth Perkins (born November 18, 1960) is an American actress. She is known for her roles in films including About Last Night (1986), From the Hip (1987), Big (1988), Enid Is Sleeping (1990), The Flintstones (1994), Miracle on 34th Street (1994), Moonlight and Valentino (1995), The Ring Two (2005) and Hop (2011). She is also well known for her role as Celia Hodes in the Showtime TV series Weeds, for which she received three Primetime Emmy nominations and two Golden Globe nominations.

== Early life ==
Perkins's paternal grandparents were Greek immigrants from Thessaloniki who anglicized their surname from "Pisperikos" to "Perkins" when they moved to the United States.

Perkins was raised in Colrain, Massachusetts; her parents divorced in 1963. She began working in theatre with Arena Civic Theatre, a non-profit community theatre group based in Greenfield, Massachusetts. Perkins attended Northfield Mount Hermon School, an elite preparatory school, and then spent 1978 to 1981 in Chicago attaining her Certificate in Acting from the Goodman School of Drama at DePaul University. In 1984, she made her theatrical debut on Broadway in Neil Simon's Brighton Beach Memoirs and afterward worked in a number of ensemble companies, including The New York Shakespeare Festival and the Steppenwolf Theater.

== Career ==
Perkins was listed as one of the 12 "Promising New Actors of 1986" in John Willis' Screen World. She made her film debut in 1986 in Edward Zwick's About Last Night... and had a career breakthrough co-starring with Tom Hanks in Big. She received critical acclaim for her performance in Barry Levinson's Avalon, and was a standout opposite William Hurt in The Doctor (1991), receiving critical acclaim for her performance as a terminal cancer patient. In 1993, Perkins appeared in the television project For Their Own Good. She later starred in the comedy series Battery Park and has appeared in television and films, including 1994's The Flintstones (starring as Wilma Flintstone) and Miracle on 34th Street (starring as Dorey Walker), and 2000's 28 Days (starring as Sandra Bullock's sister). Perkins also played a small voice role in 2003's Finding Nemo as Coral, a clownfish who is Marlin's wife and Nemo's mother who is killed and devoured by a barracuda at the beginning of the film. Perkins also appeared as a psychiatrist in 2005's The Ring Two, starring Naomi Watts.

From 2005 to 2009, Perkins played Celia Hodes, an alcoholic and image-obsessed parent–teacher association (PTA) mother, alongside Mary-Louise Parker and Justin Kirk on the Showtime series Weeds. For her work on Weeds, Perkins received two Golden Globe nominations for Best Supporting Actress in a TV Series, Miniseries or Made for TV Motion Picture (in 2006 and 2007). She was also nominated three times for an Emmy Award for Best Supporting Actress in a Comedy Series for her work on Weeds. At a screening of the season 2 finale of Weeds, at the Museum of TV and Radio on October 25, 2006, Perkins said that she considers Celia Hodes her favorite role in her career. On May 6, 2010, she announced that the fifth season of Weeds was her last despite the cliffhanger her character had in the season finale.

She starred in the 2013 ABC comedy series How to Live with Your Parents (For the Rest of Your Life). She played Birdie in the Netflix original series GLOW and Jackie O'Neill in the HBO miniseries Sharp Objects.

== Personal life ==
Perkins married Terry Kinney in 1984; they divorced in 1988. She has one daughter with Maurice Phillips. In 2000, she married Argentine-born cinematographer Julio Macat. In 2005, at the age of 44, she learned that she had latent autoimmune diabetes, a form of type 1 diabetes that is most often diagnosed in middle age.

In 2017, Perkins held a sign naming actor James Woods above the hashtag #MeToo during a rally against sexual harassment in Los Angeles.

== Filmography ==
=== Film ===
Year	Title	Role	Notes	Ref.
1986	About Last Night	Joan		
1987	From the Hip	Jo Ann		
1988	Big	Susan Lawrence		
1988	Sweet Hearts Dance	Adie Nims		
1990	Love at Large	Stella Wynkowski		
1990	Enid Is Sleeping	June		
1990	Avalon	Ann Kaye		
1991	He Said, She Said	Lorie Bryer		
1991	The Doctor	June Ellis		
1993	Indian Summer	Jennifer Morton		
1994	The Flintstones	Wilma Flintstone		
1994	Miracle on 34th Street	Dorey Walker		
1995	Moonlight and Valentino	Rebecca Trager Lott		
1997	Lesser Prophets	Susan		
1998	I'm Losing You	Aubrey Wicker		
1999	Crazy in Alabama	Joan Blake		
2000	28 Days	Lily Cummings		
2001	Cats & Dogs	Carolyn Brody		
2002	All I Want	Blanche	AKA, Try Seventeen	
2003	Finding Nemo	Coral	Voice	
2004	Gilded Stones	Polly	Short film	
2004	Speak	Joyce Sordino		
2004	Jiminy Glick in Lalawood	Miranda Coolidge		
2005	The Ring Two	Dr. Emma Temple		
2005	The Thing About My Folks	Rachel Kleinman		
2005	Must Love Dogs	Carol Nolan		
2005	Fierce People	Mrs. Langley		
2005	Kids in America	Sondra Carmichael		
2009	Le chat est mort	Rhonda	Short film	
2011	Hop	Bonnie O'Hare		
2016	Super Sex	Jane	Short film	
2016	Ghostbusters	Phyllis Adler	Extended cut	
2021	My Little Pony: A New Generation	Phyllis Cloverleaf	Voice role	
2023	Spider-Man: Across the Spider-Verse	Aunt May Parker	Voice role	
2025	Another Simple Favor	Margaret McLanden		
2025	The Housemaid	Evelyn Winchester		
2026	Gail Daughtry and the Celebrity Sex Pass	Herself	Cameo	

=== Television ===
Year	Title	Role	Notes	Ref.
1992	Roseanne	Lois	Episode: "Bingo"	
1993	For Their Own Good	Sally Wheeler	Television film	
1997	Cloned	Skye Weston	Television film	
1997	Rescuers: Stories of Courage: Two Women	Gertruda Babilinska	Television film	
1998	From the Earth to the Moon	Marilyn Lovell	Episode: "The Original Wives Club"	
2000	If These Walls Could Talk 2	Alice Hedley	Television film	
2000	Battery Park	Captain Madeline Dunleavy	6 episodes	
2001	What Girls Learn	Mama	Television film	
2002	My Sister's Keeper	Judy Chapman	Television film	
2002–04	King of the Hill	Jan Shaw, Mrs. Ashmore, Sherilyn (voice)	3 episodes	
2005	Hercules	Alcmene	2 episodes	
2005–09	Weeds	Celia Hodes	63 episodes	
2009	Monk	Christine Rapp	Episode: "Mr. Monk's Favorite Show"	
2011	Vince Uncensored	Janet Donohue	Television film	
2011	The Closer	Gail Meyers	Episode: "Road Block"	
2013	How to Live with Your Parents (For the Rest of Your Life)	Elaine Green	13 episodes	
2014	Hell's Kitchen	Herself	Episode: "15 Chefs Compete"	
2014	How to Get Away with Murder	Marren Trudeau	Episode: "Let's Get to Scooping"	
2014	One Child	Katherine Ashley	3 episodes	
2017–22	This Is Us	Janet Malone	6 episodes	
2017–19	GLOW	Birdie	2 episodes	
2017	Curb Your Enthusiasm	Marilyn	2 episodes	
2018	Sharp Objects	Jackie O'Neill	8 episodes	
2019	Corporate	The Accountant	Episode: "The Expense Report"	
2019–21	The Moodys	Ann Moody	Main role	
2019–20	Truth Be Told	Melanie Cave	Main role	
2022	Barry	Diane Villa	3 episodes	
2023	The Afterparty	Isabel Minnows	Main role (Season 2)	
2023	Minx	Constance	7 episodes	
2023	The Morning Show	Elena	Episode: "Update Your Priors"	
2026	Big Mistakes	Annette	5 episodes	
2026	Cry Wolf			

== Awards and nominations ==
Awards and nominations
Year	Award	Category	Production	Result	Ref.
1992	CFCA Award	Best Supporting Actress	The Doctor	Nominated	
2005	Satellite Award	Outstanding Actress in a Series, Comedy or Musical	Weeds	Nominated	
2006	Satellite Award	Best Actress in a Supporting Role in a Series, Mini-Series, or TV Movie	Weeds	Nominated	
2006	Golden Globe Award	Best Performance by an Actress in a Supporting Role in a Series, Mini-Series, or TV Movie	Weeds	Nominated	
2006	Primetime Emmy Award	Outstanding Supporting Actress in a Comedy Series	Weeds	Nominated	
2007	Primetime Emmy Award	Outstanding Supporting Actress in a Comedy Series	Weeds	Nominated	
2007	Screen Actors Guild Award	Outstanding Performance by an Ensemble in a Comedy Series	Weeds	Nominated	
2007	Golden Globe Award	Best Performance by an Actress in a Supporting Role in a Series, Mini-Series, or TV Movie	Weeds	Nominated	
2007	Golden Nymph	Outstanding Actress – Comedy Series	Weeds	Nominated	
2009	Primetime Emmy Award	Outstanding Supporting Actress in a Comedy Series	Weeds	Nominated	
2009	Screen Actors Guild Award	Outstanding Performance by an Ensemble in a Comedy Series	Weeds	Nominated	
2019	Critics' Choice Television Award	Best Supporting Actress in a Movie/Miniseries	Sharp Objects	Nominated	
