= Julio Macat =

Argentine-American cinematographer

Julio Macat ASC
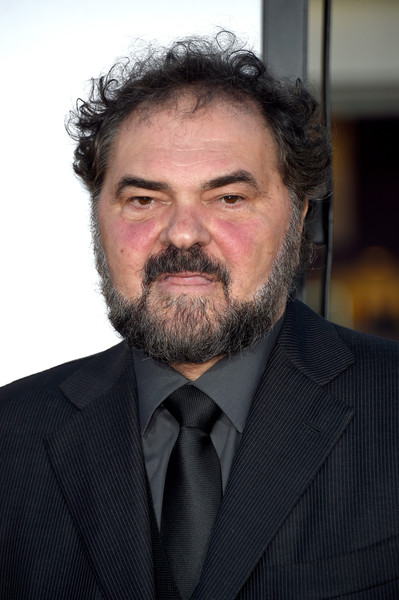
- Macat in 2016
- Born: June 20, 1957 (age 69); Rosario, Santa Fe, Argentina
- Years active: 1977–present
- Spouse: Elizabeth Perkins (m. 2000)
- Children: 3

Julio Macat ASC (born June 20, 1957) is an Argentine-American cinematographer.

== Early life ==
Born in Rosario, Argentina, Macat studied at University of California, Los Angeles.

== Career ==
He started his career off as a camera operator, under the guidance of director Andrei Konchalovsky, and worked on four of his movies including Runaway Train and Tango & Cash.

Macat served as cinematographer on the 1990 Christmas comedy Home Alone and its sequels. He would frequently work on productions helmed by Adam Shankman, such as The Wedding Planner, A Walk to Remember and Bringing Down the House.

== Personal life ==
Macat has been married to actress Elizabeth Perkins since 2000, having met during production of Miracle on 34th Street. He has three children from a previous marriage.

He has been an AMPAS member since 2003.

== Filmography ==
=== Film ===
Key
†	Denotes films that have not yet been released

Year	Title	Director	Notes
1988	Out of the Dark	Michael Schroeder	
1990	Home Alone	Chris Columbus	
1991	Only the Lonely	Chris Columbus	
1991	The Borrower	John McNaughton	With Robert C. New
1992	Home Alone 2: Lost in New York	Chris Columbus	
1993	So I Married an Axe Murderer	Thomas Schlamme	
1994	Ace Ventura: Pet Detective	Tom Shadyac	
1994	Miracle on 34th Street	Les Mayfield	
1995	Moonlight and Valentino	David Anspaugh	
1996	The Nutty Professor	Tom Shadyac	
1996	My Fellow Americans	Peter Segal	
1997	Home Alone 3	Raja Gosnell	
1999	Crazy in Alabama	Antonio Banderas	
2001	The Wedding Planner	Adam Shankman	
2001	Cats & Dogs	Lawrence Guterman	
2002	A Walk to Remember	Adam Shankman	
2002	Ballistic: Ecks vs. Sever	Wych Kaosayananda	
2003	Bringing Down the House	Adam Shankman	
2004	Catch That Kid	Bart Freundlich	
2005	Wedding Crashers	David Dobkin	
2006	Blind Dating	James Keach	
2007	Because I Said So	Michael Lehmann	
2008	Columbus Day	Charles Burmeister	
2008	Smother	Vince Di Meglio	
2009	Thick as Thieves	Mimi Leder	
2010	Our Family Wedding	Rick Famuyiwa	
2011	Winnie the Pooh	Stephen Anderson; Don Hall	Live-action scenes
2012	Pitch Perfect	Jason Moore	
2013	Syrup	Aram Rappaport	
2014	Blended	Frank Coraci	
2014	Horrible Bosses 2	Sean Anders	
2015	Daddy's Home	Sean Anders	
2016	The Boss	Ben Falcone	
2016	Middle School: The Worst Years of My Life	Steve Carr	
2017	Daddy's Home 2	Sean Anders	
2018	Life of the Party	Ben Falcone	
2019	After the Wedding	Bart Freundlich	
2023	Brave the Dark	Damian Harris	
2025	Merv	Jessica Swale	

Short film

Year	Title	Director	Notes
2004	Gilded Stones	James Dodson	With Ryan Bradley Gaw
2016	Super Sex	Matthew Modine	

Documentary film

Year	Title	Director	Note
2017	Miracle on 42nd Street	Alice Elliott	With Joey Forsyte and John Hazard

=== Television ===
Year	Title	Director	Notes
2013	Web Therapy	Dan Bucatinsky; Don Roos	29 episodes
2013	Web Therapy	Don Roos	7 episodes
2013	Trophy Wife	Jason Moore	Episode "Pilot"
2023	Fatal Attraction	Alexandra Cunningham; Pete Chatmon	3 episodes
