= Moonlight and Valentino =

- Original poster
- Directed by: David Anspaugh
- Written by: Ellen Simon (play and screenplay)
- Produced by: Tim Bevan; Eric Fellner; Alison Owen
- Starring: Elizabeth Perkins; Gwyneth Paltrow; Jon Bon Jovi; Kathleen Turner; Whoopi Goldberg
- Cinematography: Julio Macat
- Edited by: David Rosenbloom
- Music by: Howard Shore
- Production companies: PolyGram Filmed Entertainment; Working Title Films
- Distributed by: Gramercy Pictures (United States); PolyGram Filmed Entertainment (United Kingdom)
- Release date: September 29, 1995
- Running time: 105 minutes
- Countries: United States; United Kingdom; Canada
- Language: English
- Budget: $9 million
- Box office: $10 million

Moonlight and Valentino is a 1995 comedy-drama film directed by David Anspaugh starring Elizabeth Perkins, Gwyneth Paltrow, Kathleen Turner, Whoopi Goldberg and Jon Bon Jovi. The screenplay by Ellen Simon is based on her semi-autobiographical play of the same title, written after the death of her husband.

== Plot ==
Rebecca Lott is a thirtysomething poetry teacher who is widowed when her husband is killed while jogging. Helping her cope with her grief is a support system consisting of her sister Lucy Trager, a chain-smoker still trying to deal with their mother's death from cancer 14 years earlier; her best friend Sylvie Morrow, who is trapped in an unhappy marriage; and her former stepmother Alberta Russell, a high-powered Wall Street executive so caught up in the financial world she has difficulty relating to anyone not involved with it. Romance finds its way back into Rebecca's life when a flirtatious, handsome younger man hired to paint the house takes an interest in her, and his presence affects the other women as well.

"...the painter also becomes a part of Rebecca’s healing process".

== Cast ==
- Elizabeth Perkins as Rebecca Trager Lott
- Gwyneth Paltrow as Lucy Trager
- Josef Sommer as Thomas Trager
- Jeremy Sisto as Steven
- Kathleen Turner as Alberta Russell
- Whoopi Goldberg as Sylvie Morrow
- Jon Bon Jovi as the painter

In addition, Peter Coyote – in an uncredited appearance – portrays Paul Morrow.

== Background ==
Ellen Simon, daughter of Neil Simon, said:

"In 1988, my husband (and Andrew’s father), Jeff Bishop, was struck by a car while jogging in New York City. He was killed instantly....Most of the time, it was my sister, Nancy; my stepmother (actress Marsha Mason), and my best friend, Claudette. They spent two weeks at my side...these women coming together would make a great story."

"When my husband died and people came around and I felt safe to mourn and really cry, I realized how healing that is. So that was the catharsis, and I wanted to write about that."

== Reception ==
=== Critical reception ===
The film earned mostly negative reviews from critics. It holds a 13% approval rating on Rotten Tomatoes based on 15 reviews, with an average rating of 4.4/10.

In his review in The New York Times, Stephen Holden called the film "a genteel, buttoned-up soap opera" and added it "wants to be a grand, pull-out-the-stops tearjerker like Terms of Endearment or Beaches. But its situations are so awkwardly contrived that you can almost hear the machinery creaking.

Roger Ebert of the Chicago Sun-Times described the film as "very sincere, very heartfelt and very bad . . . Watching it, I felt trapped in an advice column from one of the women's magazines. I have no doubt many of the heartfelt statements in the film are true (actually, I have many doubts - but never mind). What bothered me was that the story never found a way to make them dramatic, or illustrate them with incidents. The movie is slow, plotless and relentless - one of those deals where you find yourself tapping your watch, to be sure it hasn't stopped."

In Variety, Emanuel Levy called it "sharply observed, if a tad too earnest" and added, "Though screenplay betrays its theatrical origins, Simon resists the temptation to construct the women as broad types . . . [and] to emulate her famous father (Neil Simon) in his younger years, eschewing one-liners in favor of humor that stems directly from the intensely dramatic interactions. But tale's psychological bent drives Simon periodically to resort to an overly clinical, cathartic treatment, with artificially induced conflicts and resolutions . . . Nonetheless, all shortcomings are more than compensated for by the stunning quartet of thesps . . . These four actresses ignite the screen with so much power and charisma that one yearns for more ensemble scenes."

Peter Stack of the San Francisco Chronicle described it as "fitful, tritely amusing" and "filled with little but empty gestures, contrivance and jokes that fizzle." He added, "Still, the movie, for all its imploding moments and artificial dialogue, is surprisingly well-acted, its characters given a chance by director David Anspaugh to be vital, almost as if the actors went to extraordinary pains to overcome the lame script."

In The Washington Post, Desson Howe said the film "skitters somewhere between mildly diverting and lukewarm . . . a feel-good, comically mediocre also-ran . . . the kind of movie in which everyone takes a turn being terminally adorable."

Dennis King said the film "is just too, too precious" and a "self-indulgent movie".

Chris Hicks at Deseret News said "Attempts at cleverness are too clever, characters' quirky traits seem contrived and here the situations are just too obviously a writer's conceit."

Marjorie Baumgarten of The Austin Chronicle said: "Too many paths of emotional discovery are embarked upon without delivering any true sense of arrival or even destination."

Jeanne Aufmuth of Palo Alto Online said: "Four women--a widow (Elizabeth Perkins), a virgin (Gwyneth Paltrow), a divorcee (Kathleen Turner) and a wife (Whoopi Goldberg)--are bound loosely together by family and friendship, and although a husband's death, a neurotic young love and a crumbling marriage are thrown into the mix to stir things up a bit, the bonds that attach these women are never truly tested."

=== Box office ===
The film grossed $2,484,226 in the United States and Canada and $10 million worldwide.
