= La Costa Film Festival =

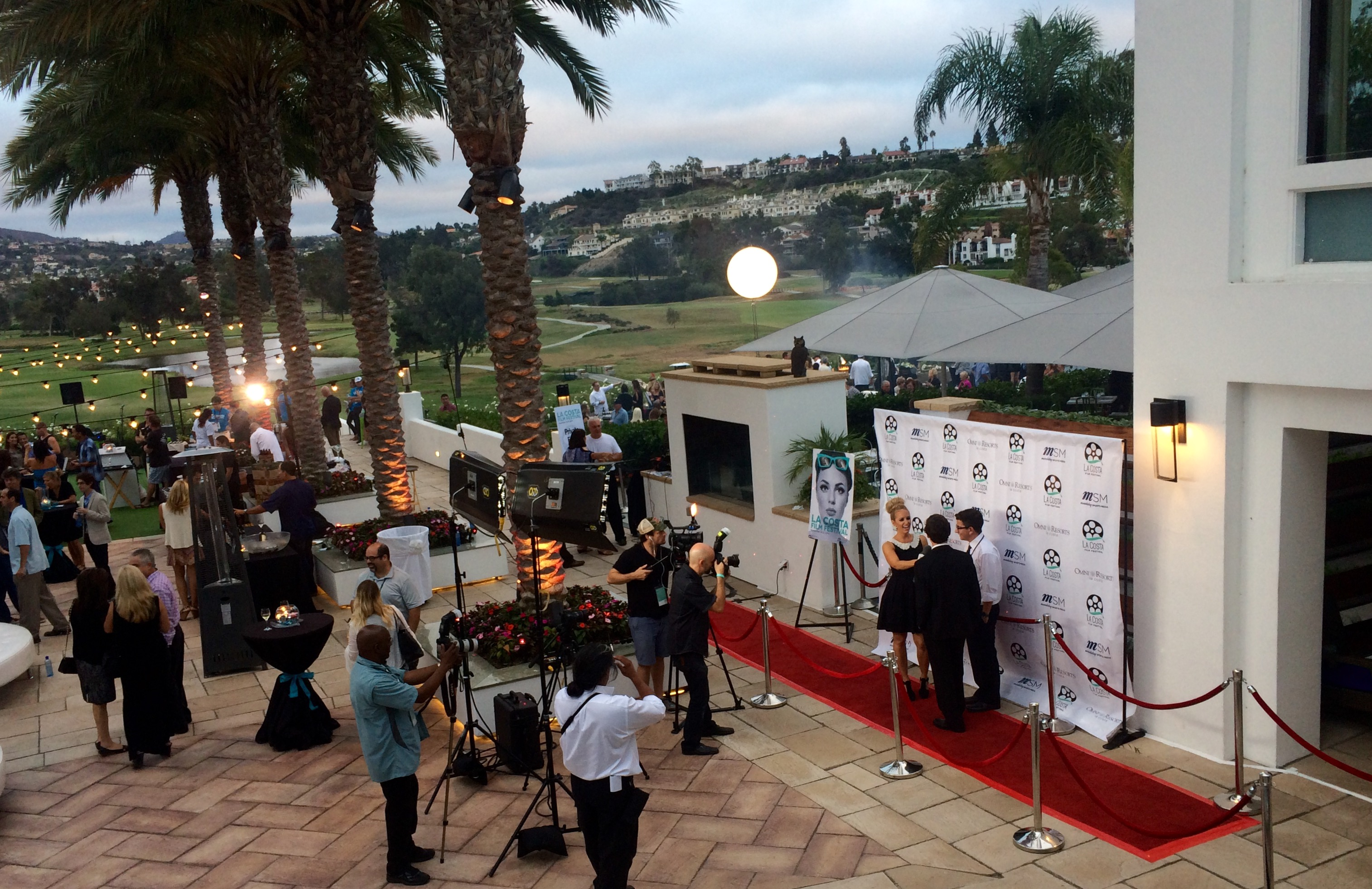
La Costa Film Festival Opening Night Red Carpet 2014

The La Costa Film Festival (LCFF) is an annual four-day film festival hosted at Omni La Costa Resort & Spa in Carlsbad, California. Founded in 2013, the festival showcases an array of full-feature and short films, galas, and annually honors renowned actors with the Legacy Award who have significantly contributed to film, arts, and the community. Previous Legacy Award recipients include Andy Garcia (2013), and Ed Harris (2014).
