= 2017 Springfield Lasers season =

Record
- 2017 record: 0 wins, 0 losses

Team info
- Owner(s): Springfield-Greene County Park Board represented by John Cooper
- President/CEO: Bob Belote
- General manager: Paul Nahon
- Coach: John-Laffnie de Jager
- Stadium: Mediacom Stadium at Cooper Tennis Complex (capacity: 2,500)

The 2017 Springfield Lasers season will be the 22nd season of the franchise in World TeamTennis (WTT).

== Season recap ==
=== Drafts ===
==== Marquee Player Draft ====
The Lasers had the second overall pick at the 2017 WTT Marquee Player Draft on February 16. They traded the pick along with other undisclosed consideration to the New York Empire for the first overall selection with which the Lasers drafted top-ranked American Jack Sock. In doing so, the Lasers left John Isner unprotected. He was chosen by the Empire with the first pick in the second round. The Empire selected Eugenie Bouchard with the pick they acquired from the Lasers in the trade. The Lasers passed on making any selections in the second and third rounds of the draft.

== Event chronology ==
- February 16, 2017: The Lasers selected Jack Sock and left John Isner unprotected at the WTT Marquee Player Draft.

== Transactions ==
- February 16, 2017: The Lasers selected Jack Sock and left John Isner unprotected at the WTT Marquee Player Draft.

== See also ==
- Sports in Missouri
