= Omni La Costa Resort & Spa =

Resort hotel in Carlsbad, California

Coordinates: 33°05′32.16″N 117°16′01.33″W

- Interactive map of Omni La Costa Resort & Spa
- Location: Carlsbad, California, USA
- Owner: Omni Hotels & Resorts
- Capacity: 2,100 (tennis)

Construction
- Opened: July 10, 1965

Tenants
- San Diego Aviators (WTT) (2015–2019); World TeamTennis Finals (2017)

Omni La Costa Resort & Spa is a luxury resort hotel in Carlsbad, California. It opened in 1965. The resort is known for its golf courses; it commonly hosts professional golf and tennis tournaments. Tournaments at the resort were hosted starting in the late 1960s, including many PGA Tour events and tennis events such as the Southern California Open. Omni La Costa Resort & Spa is a member of Historic Hotels of America and has hosted the La Costa Film Festival. It is owned by Omni Hotels & Resorts, which is based in Dallas, Texas.

== History ==
The resort was founded in the early 1960s when a real estate developer, Irwin Molasky, from Las Vegas discovered an equestrian ranch in the coastal foothills of Southern California. Originally conceived as a residential resort offering activities and instruction for all ages, the resort opened on July 10, 1965 with 40 units available to guests for $22 per night which included green fees, as well as access to tennis, horse stables and the pool.

== Professional golf ==
The resort served as a home to two notable PGA Tour events. For 30 years, the resort hosted the Mercedes Championships (originally called the Tournament of Champions), from 1969 to 1998. That event left for Maui, Hawaii, when the resort was selected to host the inaugural WGC-Accenture Match Play Championship in 1999. It hosted that event for seven of eight years (the 2001 event was played in Australia), until it moved to Arizona in 2007. In 2010 and 2012, the resort hosted the Kia Classic, an LPGA tour event with an estimated attendance of 43,000 in 2010.

== Penthouse article lawsuit ==
In March 1975, Penthouse published an article headlined "La Costa: The Hundred Million-Dollar Resort with Criminal Clientele," written by Jeff Gerth and Lowell Bergman. The article indicated that Omni La Costa Resort & Spa in Carlsbad was developed by Mervyn Adelson and Irwin Molasky using loans from the Teamsters Pension Fund and that the resort was a playground for organized crime figures. The owners, along with two officials of the resort, Morris B. "Moe" Dalitz and Allard Roen, filed a libel lawsuit for $522 million against the magazine and the writers. In 1982, a jury absolved the magazine of any liability against the lawsuit from the owners. The plaintiffs appealed, but before a new trial could begin, the two sides settled in December 1985.

Penthouse issued a statement that they did not mean to imply that Adelson and Molaskey were members of organized crime. In turn, the plaintiffs issued a statement lauding Penthouse publisher Bob Guccione and his magazine for their "personal and professional awards." Total litigation costs were estimated to exceed $20 million. According to the San Diego Reader, Adelson finally admitted to mob ties in an interview published in the March 2013 issue of Vanity Fair magazine.

== Connection to other controversies ==
On May 8, 2007, WXYZ-TV in Detroit, Michigan, reported that now convicted and deposed mayor of Detroit, Kwame Kilpatrick used $8,600 from a fund created for voter education, economic empowerment, and crime prevention to take his family and a babysitter on a week-long vacation to Omni La Costa Resort & Spa. Tax and accounting experts found Kilpatrick's use of the fund also violated IRS regulations.

== Ownership timeline ==
- 1965-1987: Mervyn Adelson and Irwin Molasky
- 1987-2001: Sports Shinko
- 2001-2007: KSL Resorts
- 2007-2010: Whitehall Street Real Estate Funds
- 2010-2013: KSL Capital Partners
- 2013–Present: Omni Hotels & Resorts
