= Palisades Tennis Club =

Tennis club in Newport Beach, California

- Location within the Los Angeles metropolitan area Location within California Location within the United States
- Type: Tennis club
- Location: Newport Beach, California
- Coordinates: 33°37′8″N 117°53′12″W
- Elevation: 41 feet (12 m)
- Opened: 1974
- Designer: Ken Stuart
- Website: palisadestennis.com

The Palisades Tennis Club is a tennis club located in Newport Beach, California with an entrance at 1171 Jamboree Road.

The club, originally called the John Wayne Tennis Club, opened in 1974. It has 16 tennis courts. There are also lounges and massage facilities. The club offers instruction to both youth and adult players.

The United States played the Netherlands at the club in the 1997 Davis Cup World Group Quarterfinals.

On January 31, 2017, the Orange County Breakers of World TeamTennis announced that the team would move its home matches to the Palisades Tennis Club starting with the 2017 season. Breakers general manager Allen Hardison said, "We are very excited to once again team up with Palisades and bring the Breakers back to their first-ever home." The Breakers played their home matches at the Palisades Tennis Club from their inaugural season in 2003 through 2006. Club owner Ken Stuart said, "Our club has a great history with the Breakers and is no stranger to hosting large-scale professional tennis events. Palisades will offer Breakers fans one of the best settings to watch a Mylan WTT match, and we are certainly looking forward to having our club members and the Orange County tennis community here this summer."
