= San Diego Aviators =

American team tennis franchise

- Sport: Team tennis
- Founded: 1995 (moved to San Diego in 2014)
- League: World TeamTennis
- Conference: Western; 2014–2015; Eastern; 2000–2013
- Division: East; 1995
- Team history: New York OTBzz; 1995–1998; Schenectady County Electrics; 1999–2000; New York Buzz; 2001–2010; New York Hamptons; 2000–2002; New York Sportimes; 2003–2013; San Diego Aviators; 2014–present
- Based in: Carlsbad, California
- Stadium: Omni La Costa Resort & Spa (capacity: 2,100)
- Colors: Thunderbird red and white
- Owner: Fred Luddy (majority); Jack McGrory (minority)
- Head coach: John Lloyd; Jim Ault (assistant)
- General manager: Jim Ault; Tamara Sarafijanovic (assistant)
- Championships: 3 King Trophies – 2005 (as New York Sportimes); 2008 (as New York Buzz); 2016 (as San Diego Aviators)
- Conference titles: 0 Western Conference Championships; 6 Eastern Conference Championships – 2002 (as New York OTBzz); 2005, 2006 and 2010 (as New York Sportimes); 2007 and 2008 (as New York Buzz)
- Playoff berths: 14 (in 13 different seasons) – 1995 and 1998 (as New York OTBzz); 1999 (as Schenectady County Electrics); 2002, 2007 and 2008 (as New York Buzz); 2005, 2006, 2008, 2009, 2010 and 2012 (as New York Sportimes); 2014 and 2016 (as San Diego Aviators)
- Website: www.sandiegoaviators.com

The San Diego Aviators were a World TeamTennis (WTT) team based in Carlsbad, California. The team played at Omni La Costa Resort & Spa. The Aviators, founded in 1995, were the oldest continuously operating franchise in WTT.

The team is the successor to two WTT franchises. The first was created in 1995, as the New York OTBzz, later renamed the Schenectady County Electrics and then the New York Buzz. The second was created in 2000, as the New York Hamptons, later renamed the New York Sportimes.

The team won the King Trophy as WTT champions three times: once playing as the New York Sportimes in 2005, once as the New York Buzz in 2008, and once as the San Diego Aviators in 2016. The three championships is the second most of any active WTT franchise behind the Washington Kastles, who have won six.

== Team history ==
The history of the San Diego Aviators begins with the 1995 WTT expansion franchise known as the New York OTBzz. The team's name was changed in 1999, to the Schenectady County Electrics and again in 2001, to the New York Buzz. The history of the Aviators also includes the 2000 WTT expansion franchise known as the New York Hamptons. That team's name was changed in 2003, to the New York Sportimes. In 2011, the Buzz and Sportimes merged with the combined team called the New York Sportimes. The combined team continued to utilize both of the former separate teams' home arenas and retained the rights to protect and retain players that had played for both formerly separate teams. In 2014, the Sportimes were sold to San Diego businessman Russell Geyser and his minority partner Jack McGrory who relocated the team and renamed it the San Diego Aviators.

=== New York Buzz ===
==== Early years as New York OTBzz ====
New York OTBzz logo used from 1995 to 1998.

The New York OTBzz were founded by Nitty Singh as a WTT expansion franchise in 1995. The team was named pursuant to a sponsorship agreement with the Capital Region Off-Track Betting Corp. The OTBzz made their debut with a 23–21 overtime loss on the road against the Florida Twist at the Country Club of Sarasota Tennis Center in Sarasota, Florida on July 14, 1995. Their home debut the following day resulted in a victory against the Charlotte Express. The four primary players for the OTBzz during their first season were Brenda Schultz-McCarthy, Roger Smith, Dave Randall and Rachel Jensen. Schultz-McCarty and Randall were the top-ranked mixed doubles team in WTT in 1995. The OTBzz finished their first regular season with 10 wins and 6 losses, second in the East Division, and lost 28–19 in the semifinals to the defending champion New Jersey Stars who went on to repeat as champions led by Martina Navratilova. Schultz-McCarthy was named WTT Female Rookie of the Year.

For their first 13 seasons (1995–2007), the OTBzz played most of their home matches outdoors at Central Park Tennis Stadium in Schenectady, New York. In instances where heavy rain was in the forecast making it impossible to play outdoors, and in the case of a power failure at Central Park Tennis Stadium before the opening match of the 2005 season, matches were occasionally moved indoors to Sportime Schenectady in Rotterdam, New York, just outside Schenectady or to the Tri-City Racquet Club in Latham, New York, a bit further away from Schenectady. Some matches featuring opposing teams with marquee players were scheduled to be played indoors. For the OTBzz's first season at Central Park Tennis Stadium, the team had to play all its matches in the daytime, because the stadium had no lights. The Schenectady Common Council had lights installed in the stadium allowing night matches to be played starting in 1996. No admission was charged to the OTBzz's home matches for their first three seasons. In 1998, the team started charging $7 for general admission tickets.

In 1996, Dave Randall was the only one of the OTBzz's four regular players from the successful 1995 team to return, and New York dropped off to a record of five wins and seven losses, fifth in WTT, and missed the playoffs. The OTBzz finished 1997, with five wins and nine losses, sixth in WTT, and again missed the playoffs.

==== First appearance in WTT Final ====
In 1998, spurred on by the performances of male rookie of the year Geoff Grant, female rookie of the year Nana Miyagi and veteran Dave Randall, the OTBzz finished first in WTT with a regular season record of 11 wins and 3 losses. Mary Joe Fernández also appeared for the OTBzz during the regular season as a marquee player. After beating the St. Louis Aces, 28–18, in a semifinal match, the OTBzz faced the defending champion Sacramento Capitals in the team's first ever WTT Final. The OTBzz were routed by the Capitals, 30–13, losing all five sets. OTBzz coach Inderjit Singh (husband of team founder and owner Nitty Singh) was named WTT Coach of the Year. Singh retired following the season and was replaced by Gerry Cuva. Randall, the last player remaining on the team from its inaugural 1995 season, also retired at the end of 1998.

==== Name change to Schenectady County Electrics ====
Schenectady County Electrics logo used from 1999 to 2000.

Following the 1998 season, Capital District Off-Track Betting Corp. withdrew from its sponsorship agreement with the OTBzz, and the team changed its name to the Schenectady County Electrics for the 1999 season. The name of the team's location was changed from New York to Schenectady County in exchange for a subsidy approved by the Schenectady County legislature.

The Electrics drafted the legendary Martina Navratilova as their marquee player prior to the 1999 season. Navratilova committed to play two matches. After losing their first two matches of the 1999 season, the Electrics bounced back in the next two matches to even their record. Jana Novotná, then ranked number 4 in the world, was scheduled to play for the Electrics in their fifth match. However, she had to pull out with a left ankle injury and never ended up appearing in a match for the Electrics. Despite the presence of Navratilova, the Electrics finished with 5 wins and 7 losses, fourth in WTT and lost to the Sacramento Capitals in the semifinals.

The Electrics protected Navratilova for the 2000 season, and she was the only holdover player from the previous year. In the marquee player draft, the Electrics selected Mary Pierce, then ranked number 4 in the world, and Pierce committed to play at least three matches. In the roster draft, the Electrics selected Rita Grande, then the number 1 Italian player, Nannie DeVilliers, former WTT male rookie of the year Michael Hill and Brent Haygarth. The Electrics traded their own former male rookie of the year, Geoff Grant, to the Delaware Smash for cash consideration. The Electrics finished the season with 8 wins and 6 losses, second place in the Eastern Conference.

==== Name change to New York Buzz ====
New York Buzz logo used from 2001 to 2010.

Following the 2000 season, the Electrics were renamed the New York Buzz. The Buzz continued to retain the rights to Martina Navratilova, but for the second consecutive season, she was the only returning player. The new players selected by the Buzz in the roster draft were Mahesh Bhupathi (frequent mixed doubles partner of Navratilova), Justin Bower, Jana Nejedly (top ranked Canadian female at the time) and 1996 NCAA singles champion Jill Craybas. In May, Navratilova announced should would not be able to play for the Buzz in 2001, due to scheduling conflicts. In July, she signed with the Delaware Smash and played two matches with them filling in for Serena Williams. The Buzz finished the season with 9 wins and 5 losses, second in the Eastern Conference, just one match behind conference champion Philadelphia Freedoms.

==== Eastern Conference Championship ====
Prior to the 2002 season, improvements were made to Central Park Tennis Stadium, and the venue was renamed Central Park MVP Stadium. The Buzz selected former world number 1 Lindsay Davenport (ranked number 9 at the time) as their marquee player replacing Navratilova. Mahesh Bhupathi and Nannie DeVilliers returned to the team. Justin Bower and Liezel Huber were added to the roster, and the Buzz had its best season to date winning the Eastern Conference championship with 11 wins and 3 losses, the best record in WTT. Bhupati was named WTT Male Most Valuable Player. Buzz coach Eric Kutner was named WTT Coach of the Year. Because she advanced deep into a WTA tournament, Davenport was not available for the WTT Final. In the second trip to the WTT Final for the Buzz franchise, they met the same opponent as in 1998, the Sacramento Capitals who defeated the Buzz, 21–13, for their fifth title in six years. Bhupathi was not available for the final, because he was playing in an ATP Tour doubles match that had been rained out the previous day.

==== Buzz falls on hard times ====
Boris Becker was chosen by the Buzz in the 2003 marquee player draft. Nannie DeVilliers and Justin Bower returned from the 2002 Eastern Conference Champions. Don Johnson and Eva Dyrberg were the other newcomers. Jolene Watanabe was named the new coach of the Buzz becoming the first female coach in WTT history. The Buzz struggled in 2003, finishing the season with 4 wins and 10 losses.

Martina Navratilova returned to the Buzz for the 2004 season after a four-year absence when she was selected in the marquee player draft. Justin Bower was the only returning player from the previous season. Marissa Irvin, Bryanne Stewart and Shaun Rudman made up the rest of the team. The Buzz struggled again in 2004, posting only 5 wins against 9 losses and finishing fourth in the Eastern Conference.

In 2005, Jim Courier was selected by the Buzz as its marquee player. Bryanne Stewart was the only player returning from the previous season. Evie Dominikovic, Brian Vahaly and Jaymon Crabb were newcomers. For the second straight year, the Buzz finished with 5 wins and 9 losses. They were fifth in the Eastern Conference.

For the 2006 season, Central Park MVP Stadium was renamed CDPHP Tennis Complex pursuant to a sponsorship agreement with Capital District Physicians Health Plan. The Buzz decided not to draft a marquee player for the 2006 season, and none of their players from 2005 returned to the team. The players the Buzz selected in the roster draft were Viktoriya Kutuzova, Gastón Etlis, Scott Lipsky and Julie Ditty. Jolene Watanable continued coaching the team. Despite the completely new roster, the results were the same as the Buzz finished with 5 wins and 9 losses for the third consecutive season, last place in the Eastern Conference by virtue of the Boston Lobsters winning the standings tiebreaker.

==== Another Eastern Conference Championship ====
The Buzz completely remade its roster again in 2007. For the second straight year, the team elected to pass on making a selection in the marquee player draft. Julie Ditty was traded to the Boston Lobsters. The Buzz selected 2005 WTT Rookie of the Year Rik de Voest in the first round of the roster draft and Ashley Fisher in the second round. In the third round, the Buzz traded down in exchange for cash consideration from the Newport Beach Breakers. The Breakers used the Buzz's number 2 pick to select Lauren Albanese while the Buzz used the Breakers' number 10 choice to take Gabriela Navrátilová. The Buzz drafted Gréta Arn in the fourth round. After four straight losing seasons, the Buzz finally turned its fortunes finishing with 8 wins and 6 losses tied for first place with the Philadelphia Freedoms in the highly competitive Eastern Conference. Only 2 match wins separated first place from last place in the conference. The Buzz won a standings tiebreaker over the Freedoms making it the top seed in the conference.

The Buzz squared off against the Freedoms in the Eastern Conference Championship Match. The Buzz fell behind 10–6 after two sets losing mixed doubles and women's doubles. In the third set, de Voest and Fisher topped Frédéric Niemeyer and Daniel Nestor in men's doubles, 5–2, to cut the Freedoms' lead to 12–11 at halftime. Olga Savchuk won a tiebreaker against Arn to take women's singles, 5–4, and give the Freedoms a 17–15 lead heading to the final set. De Voest stepped up big taking the men's singles from Niemeyer, 5–2, to squeeze out a 20–19 victory and give the Buzz their second Eastern Conference Championship.

The following day, the Buzz played in its third WTT Final, and for the third time, it met the Sacramento Capitals. The Capitals won the first four sets, three of them in tiebreakers, to take a 20–15 lead to the final set. De Voest and Fisher beat Mark Knowles and Sam Warburg in men's doubles, 5–3 to take that final set and send the match to overtime with the Capitals leading 23–20. Knowles and Warburg won the first game of overtime to give the Capitals the title, 24–20. Despite the Buzz's loss, de Voest was named WTT Championship Most Valuable Player.

==== Move to Albany and first King Trophy ====
For the 2008 season, the defending Eastern Conference Champion Buzz moved to the larger Washington Avenue Armory Sports and Convention Center in Albany, New York. Buzz ownership said that it moved to the air-conditioned indoor arena which seats about 4,000 people for tennis, because it has secure parking to serve the team's growing fan base and to "give the team much more visibility and awareness and help increase the level of hospitality the Buzz wish to provide."

For the third straight season, the Buzz passed on selecting a player in the marquee player draft. Gabriela Navrátilová was the only player returning from the previous season's conference champions. Yaroslava Shvedova was selected in the first round of the roster player draft, and Nathan Healey was taken in the second round. Navrátilová was taken as a protected pick in the third round, and Vladimir Obradović was the final selection. Jay Udwadia was named new coach of the Buzz. Before the season started, Obradović suffered a knee injury that would prevent him from playing for the Buzz. Owner/general manager Nitty Singh signed Patrick Briaud as a free agent just two days before the start of the season to take Obradović's roster spot.

A change in the WTT playoff format which was employed only for 2008, meant that the conference championship was determined by regular-season results. The Buzz posted a record of 10 wins and 4 losses which was identical to the record of the New York Sportimes. The two teams split the two matches they played during the regular season, but the Buzz won more games in those two matches giving them the tiebreaker edge and their second consecutive Eastern Conference Championship. Yaroslava Shvedova was named WTT female rookie of the year.

As the number 2 overall seed in the WTT playoffs, the Buzz was matched against the number 3 seeded Sportimes. In the first ever postseason matchup between the two New York clubs, the Buzz dominated the match winning the first four sets. Nathan Healey and Yaroslava Shvedova opened the match with a 5–3 set win against John McEnroe and Hana Šromová in mixed doubles. Shvedova followed with a 5–2 women's singles win over Ashley Harkleroad. Healy took care of Jesse Witten, 5–2, in men's singles. Gabriela Navrátilová and Shvedova needed a tiebreaker to beat Harkleroad and Šromová, 5–4, and give the Buzz a 20–11 lead heading to the final set. McEnroe and Witten won a tiebreaker over Patrick Briaud and Healy in the men's doubles to force overtime with the Buzz leading 24–16. Briaud and Healy won the second game of overtime to give the Buzz a 25–17 victory and send it to its fourth WTT Final.

In the WTT Final, the Buzz faced the Kansas City Explorers who were coming off a regular season record of 13 wins and 1 loss and thrashed the defending champion Sacramento Capitals 21–10 in the semifinals. Nathan Healey got the Buzz off to a good start with a win in the first set of men's singles over Dušan Vemić, 5–3. Yaroslava Shvedova followed with a 5–3 set win over Květa Peschke in women's singles to give the Buzz a 10–6 lead. The Explorers fought back with a 5–3 set win by Rennae Stubbs and Vemić in mixed doubles over Shvedova and Healey. Stubbs and Peschke then registered a 5–3 set win over Shvedova and Gabriela Navrátilová in women's doubles to tie the match, 16–16. In the final set, Healey and Patrick Briaud topped James Auckland and Vemić in men's doubles, 5–2, to secure the first King Trophy in Buzz history. Despite playing for the losing team, Stubbs was named WTT Championship Most Valuable Player.

==== Another move ====
After just one season at the Washington Avenue Armory, the Buzz moved again to SEFCU Arena in Guilderland, New York on the campus of the University at Albany. Longtime Buzz owner Nitty Singh cited problems with the air conditioning, parking and location of the armory as reasons for moving. She said, "We want something that is easily accessible. We don’t want to worry about the neighborhood. Last year, a lot of local people, especially [from] Schenectady, were a little leery about going down to the Armory."

In 2009, the Buzz continued its practice of passing on drafting a marquee player. Despite being the defending WTT champions, the Buzz did not protect any of their players from the previous year's team. Instead, it drafted four new players in the roster draft and put together the youngest team in WTT history. In the order selected, the players drafted by the Buzz and their ages at the time were Sloane Stephens, 16, Christina McHale, 16, Evan King, 17, and Alex Domijan, 17. Roger Smith, who played for the OTBzz in their inaugural 1995 season was named the new Buzz coach. After the roster draft, Buzz owner Nitty Singh said, "We are extremely excited to showcase America's finest juniors on our New York Buzz team this season. This keeps with our tradition of presenting the game's future stars such as Andre Agassi, Pete Sampras and Lindsay Davenport who also played tournaments here in the Capital Region during the early part of their careers." With three of their four regular full-time players having other commitments during the season, none of them other than Domijan were able to play in every match. The Buzz ended up using 13 different players in 2009, all of which were young amateurs. The optimism at the outset of the season evolved into the chaos of a rotating door through which players came and went resulting in a record for the Buzz of 4 wins and 10 losses, fourth in the Eastern Conference and barely avoided a last place finish by winning a standings tiebreaker over the Philadelphia Freedoms.

==== Martina Hingis plays full-time for the Buzz ====
The Buzz selected former world number 1 Martina Hingis in the 2010 marquee player draft, and Hingis committed to playing full-time. Alex Domijan was the only player to return from the 2009 squad. Although he wasn't protected by the Buzz, the team chose him in the third round of the roster draft. In the first two rounds, the Buzz selected Scoville Jenkins and Sarah Borwell. With Hingis committed to playing full-time, the Buzz didn't need its fourth round choice in the roster draft and sold the pick to the Sacramento Capitals for cash consideration. Jay Udwadia, who coached the Buzz to its only WTT championship in 2008, returned as the team's coach after a one-year absence. While the team continued to call SEFCU Arena its home, the July 9 home match against the Washington Kastles was played at the larger Glens Falls Civic Center in Glens Falls, New York, since it was expected to feature Hingis against Serena Williams in the women's singles set. Williams, who had just won her fourth Wimbledon ladies' singles title a few days before, did not play in the match in Glens Falls. With the Buzz struggling with 2 wins and 9 losses, Yvette Hyndman started getting some playing time late in the season. Despite the full-time presence of Hingis, the Buzz suffered the worst season in team history finishing with 2 wins and 12 losses, the worst record in WTT in 2010.

==== Merger with Sportimes ====
On February 14, 2011, WTT announced that the New York Buzz and New York Sportimes had merged with the resulting combined team to be called the New York Sportimes. The team would play five of its seven home matches each season in New York City and the other two at SEFCU Arena in Guilderland, former home of the Buzz. Nitty Singh, founder and longtime owner and general manager of the Buzz said that she wanted to refocus her efforts on two big events rather than operation of a year-round franchise. "We’re taking the fan and sponsor experience to a higher level with two fantastic nights of World TeamTennis action," said Singh. "It's a Grand Slam tennis experience. We will have big names coming to Albany each night, and our most loyal fans will follow the team back and forth from New York City. It will be a great new era for World TeamTennis in the Capital Region."

=== New York Sportimes ===
==== Early years as New York Hamptons ====
New York Hamptons logo used from 2000 to 2002.

The New York Hamptons were founded by Patrick McEnroe and Richard Ader as a WTT expansion franchise in 2000. The Hamptons made their debut with a 22–21 loss on the road against the Schenectady County Electrics at the Central Park Tennis Stadium in Schenectady, New York on July 10, 2000. Appearing in that first match for the Hamptons were player/owner McEnroe, Jonathan Stark, 15-year-old Monique Viele, and Erika deLone. After another road loss to the Delaware Smash, the Hamptons played their home opener against the Sacramento Capitals on July 13, 2000, and fell, 21–16, dropping their record to 0 wins and 3 losses. The Hamptons got their first win in franchise history at home against the Delaware Smash, 22–21, on July 14, 2000. During the season, the Hamptons signed Tina Križan as a free agent. In their inaugural season, the Hamptons played their home matches at Sportime Quogue in East Quogue, New York. The Hamptons marquee player former world number 1 Jim Courier who was committed to play in four matches during the 2000 season did not appear in either of their first two matches. The Hamptons finished their inaugural season with 5 wins and 9 losses, last in the Eastern Conference.

In 2001, the Hamptons drafted Jan-Michael Gambill as their marquee player. Patrick McEnroe, Jonathan Stark and Tina Križan returned from the previous season's team. The Hamptons chose 20-year-old Katarina Srebotnik in the roster draft. After five years away from WTT having last played with the Kansas City Explorers in 1996, John McEnroe also made a few appearances with his younger brother's team. The Hamptons improved to a record of 7 wins and 7 losses, finishing in third place in the Eastern Conference.

==== Move to Amagansett ====
In 2002, Claude Okin of Sportime Clubs became involved with Patrick McEnroe in running the team. After two years in East Quogue, the Hamptons moved their home matches to the Amagansett-East Side Tennis Club in Amagansett, New York. John and Patrick McEnroe both returned to the team along with Tina Križan and Katarina Srebotnik. The Hamptons added Robert Kendrick in the roster draft. The Hamptons had their first winning season with 10 wins and 4 losses, finishing second in the Eastern Conference just 1 game behind the New York Buzz but missing the playoffs. Srebotnik was named WTT Female Most Valuable Player.

==== Name change to New York Sportimes and move to Westchester ====
In 2003, Sportime Clubs became a co-owner of the Hamptons with Patrick McEnroe remaining part of the ownership group, and the name of the team was changed to the New York Sportimes. The team moved again, this time from eastern Long Island to Westchester County, and started playing its home matches at Sportime Harbor Island in both the village and town of Mamaroneck, New York. John and Patrick McEnroe both returned to the court in 2003, for the Sportimes and were joined by Julia Vakulenko, Ellis Ferreira and Bea Bielik who were selected in the roster draft. The Sportimes slipped to 7 wins and 7 losses, finishing third in the Eastern Conference. Bielik was named WTT Female Rookie of the Year.

John and Patrick McEnroe did not return for 2004. The Sportimes selected Monica Seles in the marquee player draft. Bea Bielik was the only player to return from the previous season. Ruxandra Dragomir, Hermes Gamonal and Joe Sirianni were added to the team through the roster draft. John Roddick was named coach of the Sportimes. The Sportimes stumbled to the poorest showing in franchise history with 2 wins and 12 losses, the worst record in WTT.

==== First playoff appearance and King Trophy ====
Following their difficult 2004 season, the Sportimes had the first choice in the 2005 marquee player draft and used it to select John McEnroe who returned to the team after a one-year absence. The team also landed former world number 1 Martina Hingis. Hingis, who had retired from tennis due to injuries at the age of 22 in February 2003, was looking to launch a comeback. After two years away from the team, Robert Kendrick, who was part of the Sportimes' successful 2002 campaign, was chosen in the roster draft. The Sportimes used their other picks to select Jenny Hopkins, Natalie Grandin and Mark Merklein. Joe Guiliano was named the team's coach. Rajeev Ram and Jeff Morrison were later signed as free agents. The complete makeover of the roster paid off as the Sportimes registered 9 wins against 5 losses and finished first in the Eastern Conference.

The Sportimes made the first playoff appearance in franchise history on September 16, 2005, in the Eastern Conference Championship Match against the Boston Lobsters in Citrus Heights, California. The Sportimes completely dominated the Lobsters winning all five sets and taking the match by a score of 25–7. Martina Hingis made a huge difference for the Sportimes who had lost both of their regular-season encounters with the Lobsters without her. Hingis won the women's singles set over Martina Navratilova, 5–2, combined with Jenny Hopkins to win the women's doubles, 5–2, over Navratilova and Kristen Schlukebir and paired with Rajeev Ram to top Navratilova and Johan Landsberg in mixed doubles, 5–2. The 18-game margin of victory was the largest ever in a WTT playoff match. The victory gave the Sportimes their first Eastern Conference Championship and advanced them to the WTT Final.

The following day, the Sportimes met the defending champion Newport Beach Breakers for the WTT title. The Breakers jumped out to an early led when Devin Bowen and Ramón Delgado beat Jeff Morrison and Rajeev Ram, 5–2, in men's doubles. Martina Hingis responded with a 5–1 set win over Katerina Bondarenko in women's singles to give the Sportimes a 7–6 lead. Hingis and Ram followed with a 5–2 set win in mixed doubles over Anastassia Rodionova and Delgado to extend the Sportimes' lead to 12–8. Hingis then teamed with Jenny Hopkins to top Bondarenko and Rodionova in women's doubles, 5–2, to give the Sportimes a 17–10 lead going to the final set. Delgado registered a 5–3 set win over Morrison in men's singles to send the match to overtime with the Sportimes leading 20–15. Delgado then won the first three games of overtime to cut the Sportimes' lead to 20–18 before Morrison won the fourth game to secure the match, 21–18, and give the Sportimes their first King Trophy. The victory topped off a nearly perfect season for Hingis. The only set she lost was in the Sportimes' second match of the regular season to Meghann Shaughnessy in women's singles. For her heroics, Hingis was named WTT Championship Most Valuable Player.

==== Repeat as Eastern Conference champions ====
John McEnroe and Martina Hingis both returned to the defending champion Sportimes for the 2006 season. The team selected husband and wife Alex Bogomolov Jr. and Ashley Harkleroad as well as John Paul Fruterro and Vladka Uhlířová in the roster draft. Chuck Adams was named new coach of the Sportimes. David Martin and Cara Black were later signed as free agents. With WTT's 2006 conference championships decided based on regular-season records, the Sportimes' mark of 10 wins and 4 losses gave them the title over the second-place Philadelphia Freedoms, who finished 8–6. The Sportimes missed having the best overall record in WTT by losing a standings tiebreaker to the Sacramento Capitals and were seeded second in the WTT playoffs. Martin was named WTT Male Rookie of the Year.

The Sportimes met the third-seeded Freedoms in the WTT Semifinals in Newport Beach, California on July 29, 2006. The Freedoms won women's doubles and women's singles to jump out to a 10–5 lead. Alex Bogomolov Jr. topped Jaymon Crabb in a tiebreaker, 5–1, to win the third set, 5–4, and cut the Freedoms' lead to 14–10. The Freedoms took the mixed doubles set, 5–2, to extend their lead to 19–12 heading to the final set. Bogomolov and David Martin topped Crabb and Daniel Nestor in men's doubles, 5–3, to send the match to overtime with the Freedoms leading, 22–17. Crabb and Nestor took the first game of overtime to win the match for the Freedoms and bring the Sportimes' season to an end.

==== A losing season but another Rookie of the Year ====
John McEnroe and Ashley Harkleroad (now divorced from Alex Bogomolov Jr.) returned to the Sportimes for the 2007 season. They added Jesse Witten, Hana Šromová and Mirko Pehar in the roster draft. Chuck Adams returned to coach the team. Sometime after the season, Harkleroad and Adams were married. Their first child, a son named Charlie, was born in March 2009. In a highly competitive Eastern Conference, the Sportimes finished with 6 wins and 8 losses, only 2 matches behind the first-place New York Buzz, but out of playoff contention. The Sportimes finished in fourth place barely avoiding the basement by winning a standings tiebreaker over the Boston Lobsters. On the bright side, Witten was named WTT Male Rookie of the Year, the second consecutive season a Sportimes player had won the award.

==== Return to the playoffs ====
John McEnroe, Jesse Witten and Hana Šromová all returned for the 2008 season. The Sportimes added Bethanie Mattek with the fourth overall pick in the roster draft and Brian Wilson with their final selection. Dustin Taylor replaced Chuck Adams as the head coach. Despite being left unprotected by the Sportimes, Ashley Harkleroad returned to the team later after signing as a free agent. The Sportimes improved to 10 wins and 4 losses, finishing second in the Eastern Conference behind the New York Buzz who had the same record but won a standings tiebreaker over the Sportimes.

Under the 2008 playoff format, the Sportimes were the number 3 seed and matched against the number 2 seed and Eastern Conference Champion New York Buzz in the WTT Semifinals. In the first ever matchup between the two New York clubs, the Buzz dominated the match winning the first four sets. Nathan Healey and Yaroslava Shvedova opened the match with a 5–3 set win against John McEnroe and Hana Šromová in mixed doubles. Shvedova followed with a 5–2 women's singles win over Ashley Harkleroad. Healy took care of Jesse Witten, 5–2, in men's singles. Gabriela Navrátilová and Shvedova needed a tiebreaker to beat Harkleroad and Šromová, 5–4, and give the Buzz a 20–11 lead heading to the final set. McEnroe and Witten won a tiebreaker over Patrick Briaud and Healy in the men's doubles to force overtime with the Buzz leading 24–16. Briaud and Healy won the second game of overtime to give the Buzz a 25–17 victory and end the Sportimes' season.

==== Move to New York City ====
After six seasons in Mamaroneck, the Sportimes moved into the newly constructed Sportime Stadium at Randall's Island in New York City for the 2009 season. John McEnroe, Jesse Witten and Ashley Harkleroad (who gave birth on the day of the draft and was picked in the third round) all returned from the previous season's squad. The Sportimes traded up in the first round of the roster draft sending their pick along with cash consideration to the St. Louis Aces in exchange for the Aces' first round pick which was number 1 overall. The Sportimes used that choice to select Robert Kendrick. Christina Fusano was taken with the Sportimes' final choice. After a one-year absence, Harkleroad's husband Chuck Adams returned to coach the team. Abigail Spears was later signed as a free agent. The Sportimes repeated their 2008 regular-season performance with 10 wins and 4 losses. This time it was enough for first place in the Eastern Conference and a trip to the Eastern Conference Championship Match.

The Sportimes faced the Washington Kastles for the Eastern Conference title at Kastles Stadium at CityCenter in Washington, D.C., on July 24, 2009. Championship Weekend, including this match, was at a predetermined site, but it ended up being a home match for the Kastles with regard to crowd support. However, as the top seed, the Sportimes were treated as the home team for determining order of play. Just eight days earlier, the two teams had been involved in an on-court incident during a regular-season match in New York that resulted in both teams and several players on each team being fined for unprofessional conduct and leaving the bench area and entering the court while not playing. The Kastles won the opening set of mixed doubles in a tiebreaker to take a 5–4 lead. The Sportimes responded when Abigail Spears defeated Olga Puchkova in women's singles, 5–2, to take a 9–7 lead. WTT Men's Most Valuable Player Leander Paes teamed with Scott Oudsema for a 5–3 men's doubles set win over Robert Kendrick and Jesse Witten to tie the match at 12–12. Rennae Stubbs and Puchkova followed with a 5–2 women's doubles set win over Spears and Christina Fusano to put the Kastles in front, 17–14. In the final set, Kendrick won a tiebreaker against Oudsema in men's singles to force overtime with the Kastles leading 21–19. Oudsema served out the match in the first game of overtime to give the Kastles a 22–19 victory and end the Sportimes' season.

==== Another Eastern Conference Championship ====
John McEnroe, Robert Kendrick, Jesse Witten, Abigail Spears and Ashley Harkleroad all returned to the Sportimes for the 2010 season. Kim Clijsters was added to the team as a marquee player. Chuck Adams continued as coach of the Sportimes. The Sportimes finished the regular season with 9 wins and 5 losses in first place in the Eastern Conference for the second consecutive season and made their third straight playoff appearance.

Unlike the previous season, the first-place teams hosted the conference championship matches in 2010. So, the Sportimes faced the Boston Lobsters at Sportime Stadium at Randall's Island for the Eastern Conference title on July 23, 2010. The Sportimes got off to a quick start when Robert Kendrick and Jesse Witten topped Eric Butorac and Jan-Michael Gambill in men's doubles, 5–2, and Ashley Harkleroad and Abigail Spears beat Raquel Kops-Jones and CoCo Vandeweghe in women's doubles, 5–3, giving the Sportimes a 10–5 lead. The Lobsters cut the lead to 14–10 when Gambill won a set tiebreaker against Kendrick. Spears topped Vandeweghe, 5–1, in women's singles to extend the Sportimes lead to 19–11. In the final set, Butorac and Kops-Jones beat Kendrick and Spears in mixed doubles, 5–2, to send the match to overtime with the Sportimes leading, 21–16. Kendrick and Spears won the second game of overtime to seal the match and give the Sportimes their second Eastern Conference Championship.

The Sportimes met the Kansas City Explorers in the WTT Final at Explorers Stadium at Barney Allis Plaza in Kansas City, Missouri on July 25, 2010. Both teams finished with identical won-lost records, and they did not play each other during the regular season. The Explorers were the overall number 2 seed, and the Sportimes were the number 3 seed by virtue of the Explorers winning a standings tiebreaker. Jesse Witten got the Sportimes off to a good start beating Ricardo Mello in men's singles, 5–3. Jarka Groth and Sam Groth responded with a 5–3 mixed doubles set win over Robert Kendrick and Abigail Spears to tie the match, 8–8. Kendrick and Witten put the Sportimes in front, 13–11, with a men's doubles set win against Samuel Groth and Mello. The Explorers edged back in front, 16–15, on the strength of Jarka Groth's 5–2 women's singles set win over Spears. Jarka Groth and Květa Peschke sealed the match with a 5–3 women's doubles set win against Ashley Harkleroad and Spears, and the Explorers registered a 21–18 victory to capture their first King Trophy.

==== Merger with Buzz ====
On February 14, 2011, WTT announced that the New York Buzz and New York Sportimes had merged with the resulting combined team to be called the New York Sportimes. The team would play five of its seven home matches each season at Sportime Stadium at Randall's Island and the other two at SEFCU Arena in Guilderland, former home of the Buzz. The combined franchise could claim a period of great success over the previous six seasons (2005–2010): 2 King Trophies (Sportimes in 2005 and Buzz in 2008), 5 Eastern Conference Championships (Sportimes in 2005, 2006 and 2010 and Buzz in 2007 and 2008) and 6 consecutive first-place finishes (Sportimes in 2005, 2006, 2009 and 2010 and Buzz in 2007 and 2008).

==== New era in New York City and the Capital District ====
The Sportimes were permitted to protect players from the 2010 Sportimes and from the 2010 Buzz for the 2011 season. So, the team protected John McEnroe, Kim Clijsters, Martina Hingis, Robert Kendrick and Jesse Witten. The newly merged team was given the less favorable (based on the 2010 Sportimes results) draft position rather than a slot based on the 2010 Buzz results. The Sportimes had to use their first two selections in the roster draft to keep Kendrick and Witten. In the third round, they chose Katie O'Brien. With six players already in the mix, the Sportimes passed on their fourth round selection. Abigail Spears, Alex Bogdanovic, Greg Jones and Travis Parrott were later signed as free agents. Spears had been an important member of the 2010 Eastern Conference Champions. Květa Peschke was also a late-season free agent signing. Clijsters did not appear in a match for the Sportimes in 2011. The Sportimes had 7 wins and 7 losses and finished third in the Eastern Conference, narrowly missing qualifying for the playoffs by losing a standings tiebreaker to the Boston Lobsters. The Sportimes and Lobsters split their two regular-season meetings. The Lobsters were placed ahead of the Sportimes based on games won during those matches, 41–37. The third-place finish ended the Sportimes franchise's streak of six consecutive first-place finishes.

==== Return to the playoffs ====
John McEnroe, Martina Hingis, Robert Kendrick and Jesse Witten all returned to the Sportimes for 2012. Ashley Harkleroad, who spent five seasons with the Sportimes from 2006 to 2010, was selected in the roster draft. The Sportimes passed on their fourth round draft pick. Harkleroad's husband, Chuck Adams, was named coach of the Sportimes. Abigail Spears, who had been with the Sportimes for the 2009 through 2011 seasons, and Květa Peschke, who played with the team in 2011, were re-signed late in the season as free agents. Shortly before the start of the season, the Sportimes were informed of a scheduling conflict at SEFCU Arena which forced the team to move its two home matches in the Capital District to McDonough Sports Complex on the campus of Hudson Valley Community College in Troy, New York. The Sportimes finished with 9 wins and 5 losses, second in the Eastern Conference and advanced to the Eastern Conference Championship Match to play the undefeated defending champion Washington Kastles. Hingis was named WTT Female Most Valuable Player.

The Sportimes and Kastles met at the Family Circle Tennis Center in Charleston, South Carolina, a predetermined neutral site that hosted WTT Championship Weekend. The Eastern Conference Championship Match was played on September 15, 2012, nearly two months after the regular season ended. The break was inserted between the regular season and the playoffs to accommodate the 2012 Summer Olympics and the U.S. Open Tennis Championships. The Kastles entered the match with a 30-match winning streak having won all 16 of their regular- and postseason matches in 2011, and all 14 of their regular-season matches in 2012. The Kastles jumped out to an early lead in the match as Leander Paes and WTT Male Most Valuable Player Bobby Reynolds won the opening set of men's doubles, 5–2, against Robert Kendrick and John McEnroe. Květa Peschke and Kendrick struck back for the Sportimes with a 5–2 set win over Venus Williams and Leander Paes to tie the match, 7–7. Reynolds topped Jesse Witten in men's singles, 5–2, to put the Kastles back in the lead, 12–9. Ashley Harkleroad and Peschke responded with a 5–2 set win of their own in women's doubles over Anastasia Rodionova and Williams to tie the match, 14–14, going to the final set. Williams dominated that final set of women's singles beating Harkleroad, 5–1, to give the Kastles a 19–15 victory and the Eastern Conference Championship and end the season for the Sportimes.

==== Final season in New York ====
Prior to the 2013 roster player draft, the Sportimes traded Martina Hingis to the Washington Kastles for financial consideration. Also prior to the draft, the Sportimes acquired Anna-Lena Grönefeld from the Orange County Breakers for financial consideration. Robert Kendrick, Jesse Witten and Květa Peschke all returned for the 2013 season. Claude Okin, the team's principal owner and CEO, also served as the team's coach for 2013. Abigail Spears was re-signed before the start of the season as a free agent. She only appeared in the opening match. During the season, Eric Quigley was signed as a free agent as well and appeared in one match. Although not drafted by the Sportimes, John McEnroe was later signed as a free agent and played for the team in 2013. James Blake was also signed during the season and appeared in one match for the Sportimes.

After a temporary one-year absence during which it played its Capital District home matches in Troy, New York, the Sportimes returned to SEFCU Arena in Guilderland. The team reversed what it had done during the first two seasons after the merger with the Buzz by playing five of its home matches in the Capital District and only two at Sportime Stadium at Randall's Island in New York City.

The Sportimes finished with a dismal record of 4 wins and 10 losses, last in the Eastern Conference and the worst record in WTT. The team's final home match in Guilderland was a 20–13 loss to the Orange County Breakers on July 18, 2013. The team's final home match in New York City was a 23–15 overtime loss to the Washington Kastles on July 23, 2013.

==== Sale of team and move to San Diego ====
On January 15, 2014, Claude Okin, CEO of the New York Sportimes announced that the franchise had been sold to businessman Russell Geyser and his minority partner Jack McGrory, and the team would be relocated to San Diego, California and renamed the San Diego Aviators. Okin said, "This is a bittersweet event for me personally. I am very glad to have found a motivated and able new owner for the franchise: a person who will be able to re-imagine it in another great tennis town – but I will miss my team." Geyser said that the team's new name was chosen "to be evocative of San Diego's long storied history of military and commercial aviation."

=== San Diego Aviators ===
==== Inaugural season ====
Aviators logo used during the 2014 season.

The Aviators' first move after relocating to San Diego was to hire David Macpherson as their coach. Macpherson immediately set to work recruiting players to fill the Aviators' roster while he was in Melbourne coaching Bob and Mike Bryan at the 2014 Australian Open. Since Macperson was the Bryan Brothers' coach, there was little doubt he was persuading them to play in WTT in San Diego. It didn't take long for Macpherson to convince the Bryans. However, the Texas Wild had the right to protect and draft them. Within a few days, on January 23, 2014, the Aviators acquired the Bryan Brothers in a trade with the Wild in exchange for undisclosed financial consideration. After the trade, Mike Bryan said, "Growing up in California, we know that San Diego is a great tennis town and we are excited to play in front of the fans, family and friends." Bob Bryan added, "We have always loved playing Mylan World TeamTennis. The competition is very tough and every point is huge. It's fast-paced and intense, and we love playing with that type of energy. We want to win for our city and our teammates. So we can’t wait for the Aviators' season to start."

With the Sportimes finishing with WTT's worst record in 2013, the Aviators had the top pick in each round of both WTT drafts. With the first overall selection in the marquee player draft, the Aviators chose Bob and Mike Bryan whom they had protected as a doubles team. Thus, the identical twins simultaneously became the first players who could call themselves San Diego Aviators. With the first pick in the second round of the marquee player draft (ninth overall), the Aviators selected Daniela Hantuchová who committed to playing in WTT full-time for the 2014 season. The Aviators protected Květa Peschke, making her the only holdover player from the 2013 Sportimes on the 2014 Aviators' roster. With the first pick in the first round of the roster player draft, the Aviators selected Somdev Devvarman. They used their second round choice for Raven Klaasen. With Hantuchová committed to playing full-time, the Aviators knew they did not need all four of their picks in the roster draft. They also knew they could wait until the fourth round to take Peschke whom they had protected. So, the Aviators traded their third round pick to the Springfield Lasers in exchange for the Lasers' fourth round pick and cash consideration. The Aviators used their fourth round pick (22nd overall) to draft Peschke and passed on the fourth round pick (27th overall) that they acquired in the trade with the Lasers, since their roster was full.

In a filing with the U.S. Securities and Exchange Commission, the Aviators disclosed a private placement seeking equity financing in the amount of US$900,000. The team was expected to net $860,000 after a broker's commission paid to Sandlapper Securities.

The Aviators played their home matches during their first season in San Diego at the Valley View Casino Center. The Aviators' inaugural match was a 23–11 home victory over the Austin Aces on July 7, 2014. Somdev Devvarman opened the match with a 5–2 set win in men's singles over Andy Roddick. Vera Zvonareva beat Daniela Hantuchová, 5–3, in women's singles to cut the Aviators' lead to 8–7. Raven Klaasen and Květa Peschke followed with a 5–2 set win in mixed doubles over Roddick and Zvonareva to extend the Aviators' lead to 13–9. A 5–2 women's doubles set win by Hantuchová and Peschke over Eva Hrdinová and Zvonareva gave the Aviators an 18–11 lead heading to the final set. Devvarman and Klaasen dominated Roddick and Treat Huey, 5–0, in men's doubles to close out the match and give the Aviators a 23–11 victory.

The Aviators finished their inaugural season with 10 wins and 4 losses, first in the Western Conference. Applying the WTT tiebreaker rules, the Aviators had the best overall regular-season record in 2014. The first-place finish gave the Aviators the opportunity to host their first playoff game for the Western Conference championship. Daniela Hantuchová was named WTT Female Most Valuable Player. Somdev Devvarman was named WTT Male Rookie of the Year. David Macpherson was named WTT Coach of the Year.

The Aviators met the defending Western Conference Champion Springfield Lasers at Valley View Casino Center for the Western Conference title on July 24, 2014. Michael Russell got the Lasers started by winning a tiebreaker in the men's singles set against Somdev Devvarman. Květa Peschke and Daniela Hantuchová answered for the Aviators with a tiebreaker win of their own in women's doubles over Olga Govortsova and Līga Dekmeijere to tie the match, 9–9. Bob Bryan and Peschke gave the Aviators a 14–12 lead in the match with a 5–3 set win over Ross Hutchins and Govortsova in mixed doubles. Govortsova dominated Hantuchová, 5–0, to give the Lasers a 17–14 lead heading to the final set. Russell and Hutchins took the men's doubles from Bob and Mike Bryan, 5–3, to secure a 22–17 victory for the Lasers and the Western Conference Championship.

==== New majority owner, new logo and a move to Carlsbad ====
On December 18, 2014, the Aviators announced that Fred Luddy and Jack McGrory, formerly minority owners, had acquired control of the team from Russell Geyser. According to the team's website as of January 2015, Luddy became the majority owner, Geyser retained a minority stake, and team CEO Billy Berger acquired a minority interest in the team. Shelly Hall, who was the onetime general manager of the San Diego Friars and served in that position for the Aviators in 2014, was no longer listed as part of the team's staff. As of March 2015, Geyser was no longer listed on the team's website as one of the team's minority owners.

On December 29, 2014, the Aviators announced that the team would move its home matches to Omni La Costa Resort & Spa in nearby Carlsbad for the 2015 season.

On January 6, 2015, the Aviators unveiled their new logo on their Facebook page.

On March 3, 2015, the Aviators announced that John Lloyd had been hired as the team's new head coach to replace 2014 WTT Coach of the Year David Macpherson, who had expressed a desire to coach in the Sacramento metropolitan area with the newly relocated California Dream.

Since Macpherson had long served as the coach for the Bryan brothers, it was inevitable that the twins would want to follow him just as they did when he was hired as the Aviators' head coach in 2014. Consequently, prior to the WTT draft on March 16, 2015, the Aviators traded Bob and Mike Bryan to the Dream for financial consideration. The Aviators did not protect 2014 WTT Female Most Valuable Player Daniela Hantuchová in the marquee portion of the draft. Madison Keys was assigned to the Aviators as a league-designated player, and they selected her as their only marquee draft pick. In the roster portion of the draft, the Aviators protected Raven Klaasen and Květa Peschke. They did not protect 2014 WTT Male Rookie of the Year Somdev Devvarman. The Aviators selected amateur Taylor Fritz and Chanelle Scheepers in the roster portion of the draft. Fritz was the only amateur player selected in the 2015 WTT Draft.

Peschke was injured and unable to play for the team during the 2015 season. Peschke is the final player still with the team who also played for the New York Sportimes prior to the franchise's move to San Diego. Pursuant to WTT Rule 308F, Peschke may be protected by the Aviators in the 2016 WTT Draft, since she was eligible for protection in 2015, and she was injured before the 2015 season and unable to play. Peschke was replaced on the roster by Darija Jurak. During the season, the Aviators signed Daniel Nguyen as a substitute player.

On June 29, 2015, the Aviators announced that James Blake would coach the team in its season-opening match on July 12, at home against the Dream. Following that match, Lloyd served as the Aviators coach for the remainder of the season. In the days leading up to the season opener, the Aviators hinted in social media posts that there was a surprise in store. Just hours before the opening match, the Aviators announced that Blake would not only coach the team, but he would also play.

The Aviators started the season strong, winning three of their first four matches. However, they followed this with a five-match losing streak that was capped off by losses on consecutive evenings in a home-and-home series with the Dream with whom they were contending for a playoff berth. The Aviators finished the season with 5 wins and 9 losses and missed the playoffs.

==== A championship for San Diego ====
In the fall of 2015, Jim Ault was named the new general manager of the Aviators. He is also the assistant coach of the team and is leading the team's business development. The Aviators named Tamara Sarafijanovic assistant general manager.

On February 29, 2016, the Aviators started using a new logo on their website and Facebook page. The new logo retains the use of red and white that was featured in the 2015 logo.

Prior to the start of the 2016 season, Billy Berger's name no longer appeared on the team's website as CEO or minority owner.

James Blake, who played for the team as a wildcard in 2015, was assigned by WTT to Aviators as a designated player. The Aviators did not protect 2015 marquee player Madison Keys. In the roster portion of the draft, the Aviators protected Raven Klaasen and Darija Jurak. They chose Shelby Rogers with their first-round selection, leaving 2015 amateur and winner of the 2015 US Open boys' singles title, but now turned professional, Taylor Fritz unprotected. The protection of Jurak and the selection of Rogers also meant that the Aviators could not protect Květa Peschke, the last remaining member of the team who played for the franchise when it was known as the New York Sportimes, and Chanelle Scheepers. The Aviators chose Daniel Evans with their third-round selection in the roster player portion of the draft. On July 8, 2016, Aviators coach John Lloyd announced that Evans had withdrawn from WTT for undisclosed reasons. On July 15, the Aviators signed Ryan Harrison as a roster player to fill the spot created by Evans's departure.

The Aviators opened their season with a four-game series against the Orange County Breakers, who were returning to Southern California after playing the previous two seasons as the Austin Aces. When the Breakers last called Orange County their home in 2013, the Aviators had not yet moved to California and were known as the New York Sportimes. While the teams did not have any history as geographic rivals, the franchises did meet in the 2005 WTT Finals with the Sportimes earning the title with a 21–18 victory over the Newport Beach Breakers. The two franchises also boasted the best regular-season records in WTT over the past two seasons with the Aviators achieving the feat in 2014, and the Aces doing so in 2015. The Aviators and Breakers split the series with each team winning both of its home matches. The four matches in four nights quickly developed the feel of a rivalry. "It definitely starts to get a little personal", said the Breakers' Nicole Gibbs. "Things got a little feisty tonight, so it was a good night to bring the cameras. We were getting in each other's faces, and there were some big 'Come ons'. Definitely some emotional moments."

Following the series with the Breakers, the Aviators swept a four-match homestand to finish with a perfect record of 6 wins and 0 losses on their home court. Ernests Gulbis made an appearance for the team as a substitute player. A victory over the Kastles in the opener of their season-ending four-match road trip gave the Aviators five straight wins and improved the team's record to 7 wins and 2 losses.

After a loss to the Springfield Lasers, the Aviators headed to Forest Hills Stadium for their first match in New York City since July 23, 2013, when they were the home team playing as the New York Sportimes. But on August 12, 2016, the Aviators would be the road team facing the Empire. The Aviators won four of the five sets led by Harrison, who won the opening set of men's singles and teamed with Klaasen to close out the match in the final set of men's doubles. Jurak paired with Klaasen to win the third set of mixed doubles and with Rogers to win the fourth set of women's doubles. The 24–16 victory gave the Aviators 8 wins and 3 losses and clinched their berth in the WTT Finals.

During their final regular-season match against the Freedoms, the Aviators clinched the best overall record in WTT, when the Kastles defeated the Breakers. The Aviators later lost their match against the Freedoms to fall to 8 wins and 4 losses, an identical record to that of the Breakers. Since the teams split their four matches during the regular season, the tie in the standings was broken by most games won in head-to-head matches, which favored the Aviators, 82–77. Being the top seed in the WTT Finals resulted in the Aviators being treated as the home team and having the option to set the order of play. Nick Monroe appeared in that final match as a substitute player.

Harrison was named 2016 WTT Male Most Valuable Player. He led the league in winning percentage in men's singles and was also second in men's doubles behind Klaasen. Lloyd was named 2016 WTT Coach of the Year.

The Aviators met their new rivals, the Breakers, in the WTT Finals on August 26, 2016, at Forest Hills Stadium in New York City. The Aviators won the first four sets, all by 5–2 scores. Jurak and Klaasen opened with a set win in mixed doubles. Rogers followed by beating 2016 WTT Female Most Valuable Player Nicole Gibbs in women's singles. Klaasen teamed with Harrison in men's doubles. Jurak and Rogers took the fourth set of women's doubles to give the Aviators a 20–8 lead. Dennis Novikov won a tiebreaker against Harrison in the final set of men's singles to send the match to extended play with the Aviators leading 24–13. Novikov held serve in the opening game of extended play. However, Harrison, who won a US Open qualifying match earlier in the day to secure a spot in the Grand Slam tournament, held serve in the second game, giving the Aviators a 25–14 victory and the 2016 King Trophy, the third WTT championship in franchise history and the first since moving to San Diego. Klaasen was named WTT Finals Most Valuable Player. It was the first time in franchise history that the Aviators finished with WTT's best regular-season record and followed up by winning the league championship.

== Season-by-season records ==
The following table shows regular season records, playoff results and titles won by the San Diego Aviators franchise since its founding in 1995.

Year	Team Name	W	L	PCT	Playoff result	Titles won
1995	New York OTBzz	10	6	.625	Lost in WTT Semifinals	
1996	New York OTBzz	5	7	.417	Missed playoffs	
1997	New York OTBzz	5	7	.357	Missed playoffs	
1998	New York OTBzz	11	3	.786	Won WTT Semifinal Match; Lost in WTT Final	Best regular-season record in WTT
1999	Schenectady County Electrics	5	7	.417	Lost in WTT Semifinals	
2000	Schenectady County Electrics	8	6	.571	Missed playoffs	
2000	New York Hamptons	5	9	.357	Missed playoffs	
2001	New York Buzz	9	5	.643	Missed playoffs	
2001	New York Hamptons	7	7	.500	Missed playoffs	
2002	New York Buzz	11	3	.786	Lost in WTT Final	Eastern Conference Champions; Best regular-season record in WTT
2002	New York Hamptons	10	4	.714	Missed playoffs	
2003	New York Buzz	4	10	.286	Missed playoffs	
2003	New York Sportimes	7	7	.500	Missed playoffs	
2004	New York Buzz	5	9	.357	Missed playoffs	
2004	New York Sportimes	2	12	.143	Missed playoffs	
2005	New York Buzz	5	9	.357	Missed playoffs	
2005	New York Sportimes	9	5	.643	Won Eastern Conference Championship Match; Won WTT Final Match	WTT Champions; Eastern Conference Champions
2006	New York Buzz	5	9	.357	Missed playoffs	
2006	New York Sportimes	10	4	.714	Lost in WTT Semifinal Match	Eastern Conference Champions
2007	New York Buzz	8	6	.571	Won Eastern Conference Championship Match; Lost in WTT Final	Eastern Conference Champions
2007	New York Sportimes	6	8	.429	Missed playoffs	
2008	New York Buzz	10	4	.714	Won WTT Semifinal Match; Won WTT Final Match	WTT Champions; Eastern Conference Champions
2008	New York Sportimes	10	4	.714	Lost in WTT Semifinal Match	
2009	New York Buzz	4	10	.286	Missed playoffs	
2009	New York Sportimes	10	4	.714	Lost in Eastern Conference Championship Match	
2010	New York Buzz	2	12	.143	Missed playoffs	
2010	New York Sportimes	9	5	.643	Won Eastern Conference Championship Match; Lost in WTT Final Match	Eastern Conference Champions
2011	New York Sportimes	7	7	.500	Missed playoffs	
2012	New York Sportimes	9	5	.643	Lost in Eastern Conference Championship Match	
2013	New York Sportimes	4	10	.286	Missed playoffs	
2014	San Diego Aviators	10	4	.714	Lost in Western Conference Championship Match	Best regular-season record in WTT
2015	San Diego Aviators	5	9	.357	Missed playoffs	
2016	San Diego Aviators	8	4	.667	Won WTT Final Match	WTT Champions; Best regular-season record in WTT
2017	San Diego Aviators	9	5	.643	Lost in WTT Final	
Subtotals	New York OTBzz; Schenectady County Electrics; New York Buzz	107	113	.486	WTT Finals: 1 win, 3 losses, .250; All Playoff Matches: 4 wins, 5 losses, .444	WTT Champions – 1 (2008); Eastern Conference Champions – 3 (2002, 2007, 2008); Best regular-season record in WTT – 2 (1998, 2002)
Subtotals	New York Hamptons; New York Sportimes	105	91	.536	WTT Finals: 1 win, 1 loss, .500; All Playoff Matches: 3 wins, 5 losses, .375	WTT Champions – 1 (2005); Eastern Conference Champions – 3 (2005, 2006, 2010); Best regular-season record in WTT – 0
Sutotals	San Diego Aviators	23	17	.575	WTT Finals: 1 win, 1 loss, .500; All Playoff Matches: 1 win, 1 loss, .500	WTT Champions – 1 (2016); Western Conference Champions – 0 Best regular-season record in WTT – 2 (2014, 2016)
Grand Totals		227	217	.511	WTT Finals: 3 wins, 5 losses, .375; All Playoff Matches: 8 wins, 12 losses, .400	WTT Champions – 3 (2005, 2008, 2016); Eastern Conference Champions – 6 (2002, 2005, 2006, 2007, 2008, 2010); Western Conference Champions – 0 Best regular-season record in WTT – 4 (1998, 2002, 2014, 2016)

== Home courts ==
The following table shows home courts used by the San Diego Aviators franchise since its founding in 1995.

Venue	Location	Duration		Notes
Venue	Location	Start	End	Notes
CDPHP Tennis Complex (Note: The stadium was called Central Park Tennis Stadium from 1995 to 2001. It was called Central Park MVP Stadium from 2002 to 2005. It was renamed CDPHP Tennis Complex before the 2006 season.)	Schenectady, New York	1995	2007	Primary home venue (OTBzz, Electrics, Buzz)
Sportime Schenectady	Rotterdam, New York	1995	2007	Alternate venue in case of rain (OTBzz, Electrics, Buzz)
Sportime Quogue	East Quogue, New York	2000	2001	Primary home venue (Hamptons)
Amagansett-East Side Tennis Club	Amagansett, New York	2002	2002	Primary home venue (Hamptons)
Sportime Harbor Island	Mamaroneck, New York	2003	2008	Primary home venue (Sportimes)
Tri-City Racquet Club	Latham, New York	2005	2005	Alternate venue used because of a power failure at Central Park MVP Stadium (Buzz)
Washington Avenue Armory Sports and Convention Arena	Albany, New York	2008	2008	Primary home venue (Buzz)
Sportime Stadium at Randall's Island (Note: The team played home matches in both New York City and the Capital District from 2011 to 2013, after the merger of the New York Sportimes and the New York Buzz. Over those three seasons, 12 home matches were played at Sportime Stadium at Randall's Island, seven were played at SEFCU Arena and two were played at McDonough Sports Complex.)	New York City	2009	2013	Primary home venue (Sportimes)
SEFCU Arena	Guilderland, New York	2009	2011	Primary home venue (Buzz 2009–2010, Sportimes 2011)
Glens Falls Civic Center	Glens Falls, New York	2010	2010	One marquee match played at the venue (Buzz)
McDonough Sports Complex	Troy, New York	2012	2012	Primary home venue (Sportimes)
SEFCU Arena	Guilderland, New York	2013	2013	Primary home venue (Sportimes)
Valley View Casino Center	San Diego, California	2014	2014	Primary home venue (Aviators)
Omni La Costa Resort & Spa	Carlsbad, California	2015		Primary home venue (Aviators)

== Individual honors ==
The following table shows individual honors bestowed upon players and coaches of the San Diego Aviators franchise since its founding in 1995.

Year	Player/Coach	Team	Award
1995	Brenda Schultz-McCarthy	New York OTBzz	Female Rookie of the Year
1998	Nana Miyagi	New York OTBzz	Female Rookie of the Year
1998	Geoff Grant	New York OTBzz	Male Rookie of the Year
1998	Inderjit Singh	New York OTBzz	Coach of the Year
2002	Mahesh Bhupathi	New York Buzz	Male Most Valuable Player
2002	Eric Kutner	New York Buzz	Coach of the Year
2002	Katarina Srebotnik	New York Hamptons	Female Most Valuable Player
2003	Bea Bielik	New York Sportimes	Female Rookie of the Year
2005	Martina Hingis	New York Sportimes	Championship Most Valuable Player
2006	David Martin	New York Sportimes	Male Rookie of the Year
2007	Rik de Voest	New York Buzz	Championship Most Valuable Player
2007	Jesse Witten	New York Sportimes	Male Rookie of the Year
2008	Yaroslava Shvedova	New York Buzz	Female Rookie of the Year
2012	Martina Hingis	New York Sportimes	Female Most Valuable Player
2014	Daniela Hantuchová	San Diego Aviators	Female Most Valuable Player
2014	Somdev Devvarman	San Diego Aviators	Male Rookie of the Year
2014	David Macpherson	San Diego Aviators	Coach of the Year
2016	Ryan Harrison	San Diego Aviators	Male Most Valuable Player
2016	John Lloyd	San Diego Aviators	Coach of the Year
2016	Raven Klaasen	San Diego Aviators	Finals Most Valuable Player

== Hall of Fame players ==
The following players who are enshrined in the International Tennis Hall of Fame have played for the San Diego Aviators franchise since its founding in 1995:

Player	Years	Team
Martina Navratilova	1999–2000	Schenectady County Electrics
Martina Navratilova	2004	New York Buzz
John McEnroe	2001–2002	New York Hamptons
John McEnroe	2003, 2005–2013	New York Sportimes
Lindsay Davenport	2002	New York Buzz
Boris Becker	2003	New York Buzz
Monica Seles	2004	New York Sportimes
Jim Courier	2005	New York Buzz
Martina Hingis	2005–2006, 2011–2012	New York Sportimes
Martina Hingis	2010	New York Buzz

== Current squad ==
2018 roster

- (United Kingdom) John Lloyd, Coach
- (United Kingdom) Marcus Willis
- (United Kingdom) Naomi Broady
- (Poland) Marcin Matkowski
- (Germany) Anna-Lena Grönefeld
- (United States) Taylor Fritz *
- (United States) CoCo Vandeweghe *

* = Franchise players who play a limited season

== See also ==
- Sports in San Diego
- New York Sportimes
- New York Buzz
- New York Apples
- San Diego Friars (1975–1978)
- San Diego Buds
