= Ted Gup =

American writer and academic

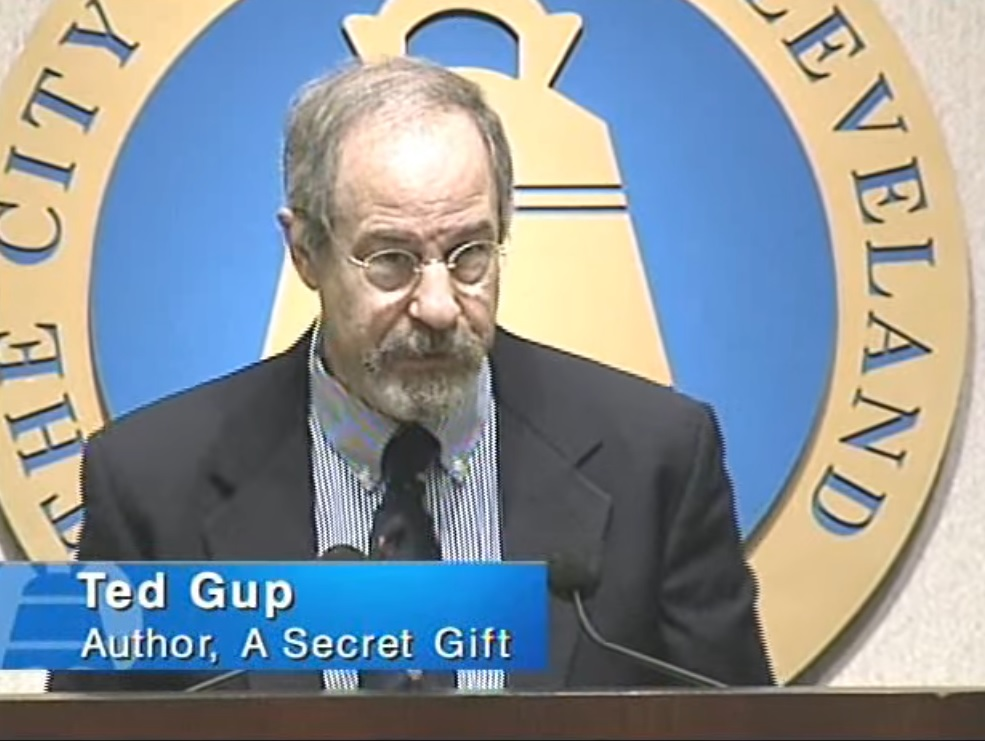
- Born: September 14, 1950 (age 76); Canton, Ohio

Ted Gup (born September 14, 1950) is the Eugene Lang Visiting Professor on Issues of Social Change at Swarthmore College. An author, journalist and professor, he is known for his work on government secrecy, free speech and journalistic ethics. He is the best-selling author of three books, including The Book of Honor: Covert Lives and Classified Deaths at the CIA, which told the stories of previously unnamed CIA officers killed in the line of duty. His work has appeared in Slate, The Guardian, The Washington Post, National Geographic, Smithsonian, The New York Times, Politico, The New Republic, The Nation, NPR, GQ, and numerous other venues.

Gup has been a prolific writer regarding doomsday scenarios and facilities to provide for continuity of government and the preservation of important assets of civilization, including the Mount Weather facility, as well as intelligence issues.

In the 1992 Washington Post Magazine article "The Ultimate Congressional Hideaway," Gup was the first to reveal publicly the existence of Project Greek Island, a large underground bunker at West Virginia's famed Greenbrier Resort to house the Congress of the United States in case of a nuclear attack on Washington, D.C., a revelation still considered controversial two decades after its publication. Those opposed to the revelation note that the exposure rendered the $14,000,000 ($123,382,792 by current standards) taxpayer-funded bunker useless and led to its decommissioning. Gup defended the story in a 2009 interview with Cleveland's Plain Dealer, arguing that the Greenbrier bunker was obsolete in 1992. "We sat on the story for a couple of months making sure it wouldn't harm national security," Gup said. "The bunker mentality that preserved that place was itself a threat to national security. It's exactly why you want an active press."

Gup, a 1968 graduate of Western Reserve Academy in Hudson, Ohio, was a reporter for The Washington Post and Time Magazine prior to his work in academia. He was the Shirley Wormser Professor of Journalism at Case Western Reserve University before heading the journalism department at Emerson College in Boston, Massachusetts and was a Guggenheim Fellowship recipient in 2003. He was also a 1980 recipient of the George Polk award in journalism offered by Long Island University. He shared the 1981 Gerald Loeb Award for Large Newspapers, and received an Honorable Mention in the same category in 1984.

For his book, Nation of Secrets: The Threat to Democracy and the American Way of Life, published by Doubleday he received the 2007 Orwell Award. In this book he contended that the political culture was defined by a misguided desire for secrecy and was undermining the transparency of democratic institutions.

His 2010 book, A Secret Gift, much unlike anything else he had ever written, chronicles the Christmastime 1933 anonymous charitable efforts of his Romanian Orthodox Jewish grandfather, Sam Stone, to help families in Canton, Ohio affected by the Great Depression.

Gup lost his oldest son David, aged 21, on October 18, 2011.

In the Michaelmas term of 2015 he was a Fellow of the Institute of Advanced Study at Durham University, where he was affiliated to the St. Cuthbert's Society SCR. He returned to Durham as Writer in Residence at St Cuthbert's in 2017 and again in 2019.

== Books ==
- Nation of Secrets: The Threat to Democracy and the American Way of Life. 2007
- A Secret Gift. 2010
