= Hickory golf =

Variation of golf played with hickory golf clubs

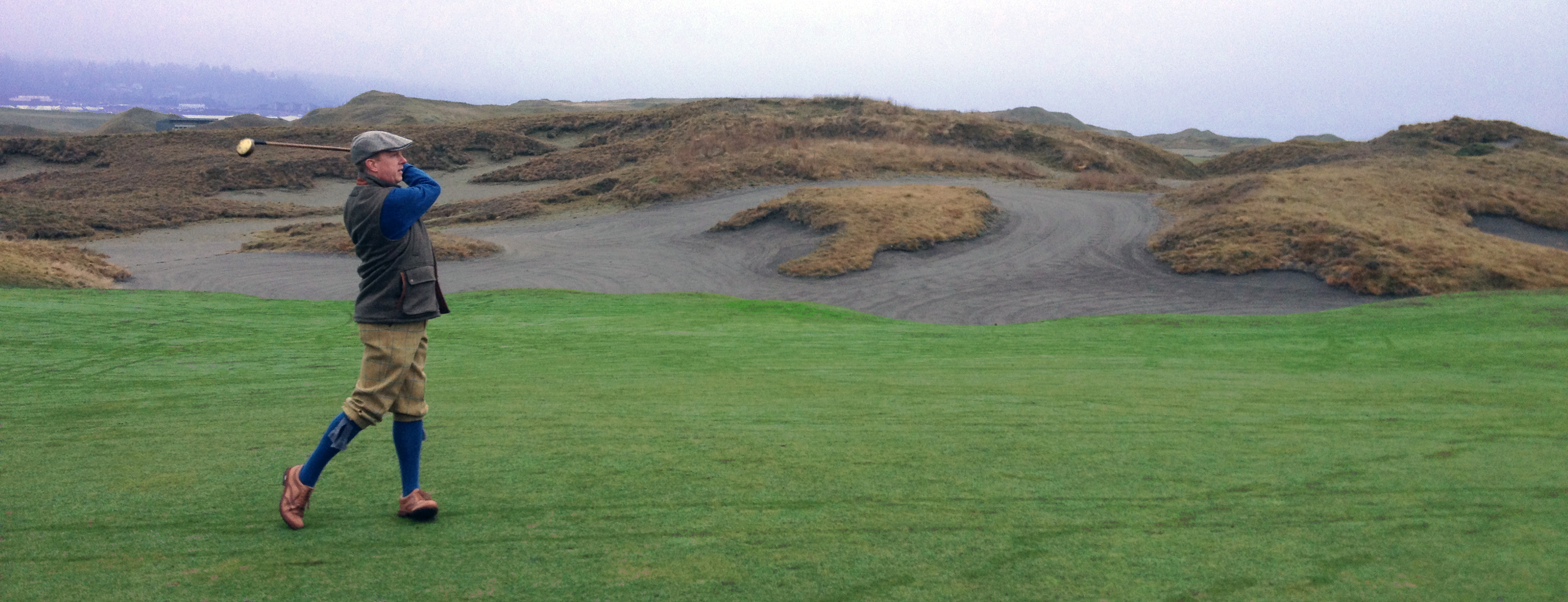
American hickory golfer on 14th hole at Chambers Bay Golf Course, University Place, WA, on January 1, 2014.

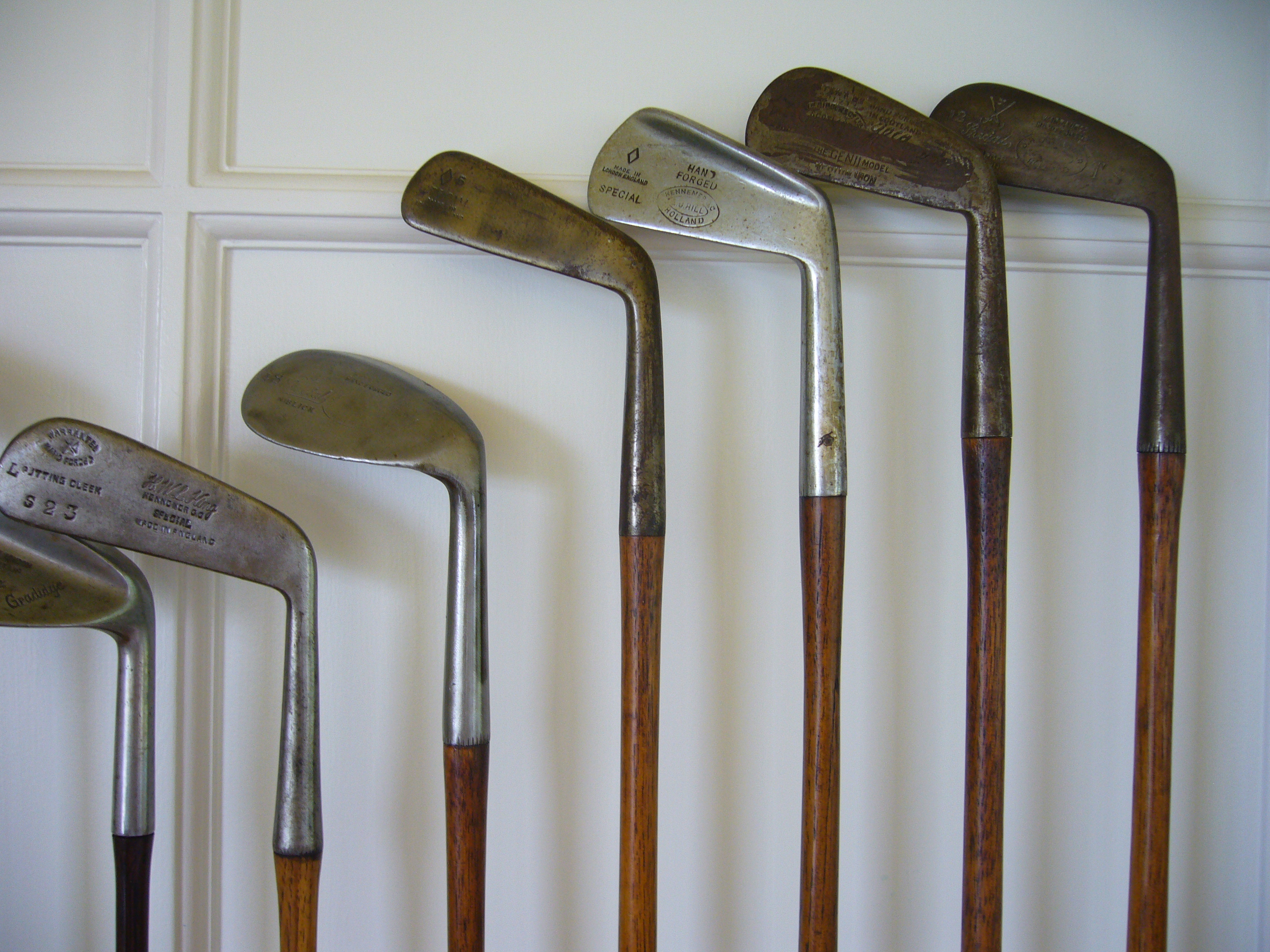
Hickory-shafted golf clubs

Hickory golf is a variation of golf played with hickory-shafted golf clubs. In the United States the main organizing body is the Society of Hickory Golfers (SoHG); in Canada, the Golf Historical Society of Canada; in the U.K., the British Golf Collectors Society; and leading on the continent, the European Association of Golf Historians and Collectors. There are also quite active groups in Switzerland, Austria, Germany, Italy, Croatia, Sweden, Poland, Finland, Australia, New Zealand, and Japan that conduct national tournaments.

Part of the attraction of playing with hickory clubs is that they reintroduce 'feel' to the golf shot. Adherents enjoy the challenge of finding and restoring clubs suitable for play. Proponents also claim that hickory golf allows golfers to play classic golf courses as they are meant to be played.

== Divisions ==
There are two main divisions of play, pre-1935 and pre-1900. A small niche of golfers in the U.S. have begun experimenting with feather-ball golf and reproduction clubs. This style attempts to replicate golf as it was played prior to about 1850.

The pre-1900 group play a replicated gutta-percha style ball, and clubs are limited to those produced before 1900 or approved reproductions. Iron clubs are smooth-faced and woods are splice-necked. Several "gutty" tournaments exist in the U.S. Three of the most prominent are the long-running National Hickory Championship organized by Peter Georgiady; the Foxburg Hickory Championship, organized by Tom Johnson; and the Keeper of the Spirit Hickory Championship, organized by Greg Smith. Many of the early "NHC" tournaments were conducted in White Sulphur Springs, West Virginia at Oakhurst Links, as restored by Lewis Keller, and identified by the National Register of Historic Places as the oldest golf course in the United States. The NHC has also been held at Pinehurst No. 8 & No. 1 (one Championship) and The St. Martin's course of The Philadelphia Cricket Club (two Championships). Other gutty golf venues include the Foxburg Country Club in Foxburg, Pa., and the Eagle Springs Golf Course in Eagle Springs, Wisc. Other gutty tournaments are gaining traction throughout the U.S. as well.

The pre-1935 group (vintage division) play with modern balls, but play is limited to clubs manufactured before 1935 or to authorized reproductions. There are numerous tournaments and championships throughout the world.

== Championships ==
There are a number of Championships conducted in countries around the world. The majority of the events are currently held in the United States and the United Kingdom. The chief tournament in the U.S. is the U.S. Hickory Open, which rotates around the country at various golf and country clubs. It has been held annually since 2008. In Europe, Poland, Sweden, Switzerland, Germany, Australia, France, the Czech Republic, and Finland have held national championships. In the Asia/South Pacific region, Australia, New Zealand, and Japan are leading hickory golf countries. The main international schedule of tournaments is on the SoHG website tournament page, and at Hickorygolf.com. A list of regional and national playing societies and associations may be found at the Resources page of the SoHG.

Important European hickory championships include the French hickory golf Championship (francehickory.com) of La Société Française de Golf Hickory; the Swiss Hickory Championship (swisshickory.ch), held on the oldest golf course in Switzerland, the Engadine Golf Club in St. Moritz/Samedan. Amateurs and professionals are welcomed to participate in this hickory event. The Polish Hickory Open is sponsored by "Hickory World" – an organisation promoting hickory golf.

The World Hickory Open Championship (www.worldhickoryopen.com), which was inaugurated in 2004 by the late Lionel Freedman, is held today on variety of courses in Scotland and annually attracts around 100 players from across the world.
