= Forward Challenge =

Forward Challenge 06 was an exercise in crisis operations and continuity of government operation conducted by the Federal Emergency Management Agency and other agencies in June 2006. The exercise included activities at Mount Weather in Virginia.
