= Emily Matchar =

American journalist and author (born 1982)

- Born: 1982 (age 43–44)
- Education: Harvard University
- Occupations: Journalist; author
- Children: 2

Emily Matchar (born 1982) is an American novelist and journalist. Originally from Chapel Hill, North Carolina, she graduated from Harvard University in 2004. Her work has appeared in The New York Times, The Washington Post, and The Atlantic, among others. Her debut historical fiction novel, In the Shadow of the Greenbrier, set at The Greenbrier resort in West Virginia, was published by Putnam at Penguin Random House in 2024. Her second novel, The Lost Girl of Craven County, set in 1930s New Bern, North Carolina, was published by Putnam in 2026. Her non-fiction book, Homeward Bound, a critical exploration of domestic influencer culture, was published by Simon & Schuster in 2013 and received favorable reviews from The New Yorker, The New Republic, and The Washington Post, among many others. She has made numerous appearances on TV and radio, including The Colbert Report, Good Morning America, MSNBC's The Cycle, NPR, and the BBC. Matchar lives with her husband and two sons.
