= Oakhurst Links =

- U.S. National Register of Historic Places
- Location within West Virginia Location within the United States
- Location: 1 Montague Dr., White Sulphur Springs, West Virginia
- Coordinates: 37°49′41″N 80°16′47″W
- Area: 37.8 acres (15.3 ha)
- Built: 1884
- Architect: Montague, Russell W.; Torrin, Lionel, et al.
- Architectural style: Colonial Revival
- NRHP reference No.: 01001327
- Added to NRHP: December 4, 2001

Oakhurst Links is a historic golf course located at White Sulphur Springs, Greenbrier County, West Virginia. It was the first golf course in the United States. It is a nine-hole course built in 1884, in a design based upon traditional Scottish design elements. The first competition for the Oakhurst Links Challenge Medal was held in 1884.

== Description ==
Located on the grounds is course developer Russell W. Montague's home, which served as the Oakhurst Links Clubhouse. The clubhouse was built around 1880, and is a two-story "I house" plan dwelling with sparse Colonial Revival stylistic elements. The property was operated as a golf course until 1912, when the property reverted to pasture. In 1959 the property was purchased by Lewis Keller and his wife, Rosalie. For many years, Keller raised thoroughbred race horses on the property. Keller often played with Sam Snead, who was the resident playing professional at The Greenbrier resort in White Sulphur Springs. Snead told Keller he believed the property was the site of the first golf course in the United States.

In 1994, a restoration effort was launched for the course. The course was listed on the National Register of Historic Places in 2001.

Except for one year at Pinehurst No. 1 course, the National Hickory Championship was played at Oakhurst Links from 1998 to 2015. Modern players typically dressed in period clothes and use hickory-shafted clubs and gutta-percha balls driven from tees fashioned from sand as was done before the wooden tee was invented.

The course was damaged by floods in 2016; as of 2023, it has still not re-opened.
