= The Greenbrier =

Resort hotel in West Virginia

Coordinates: 37.7854°N 80.3083°W

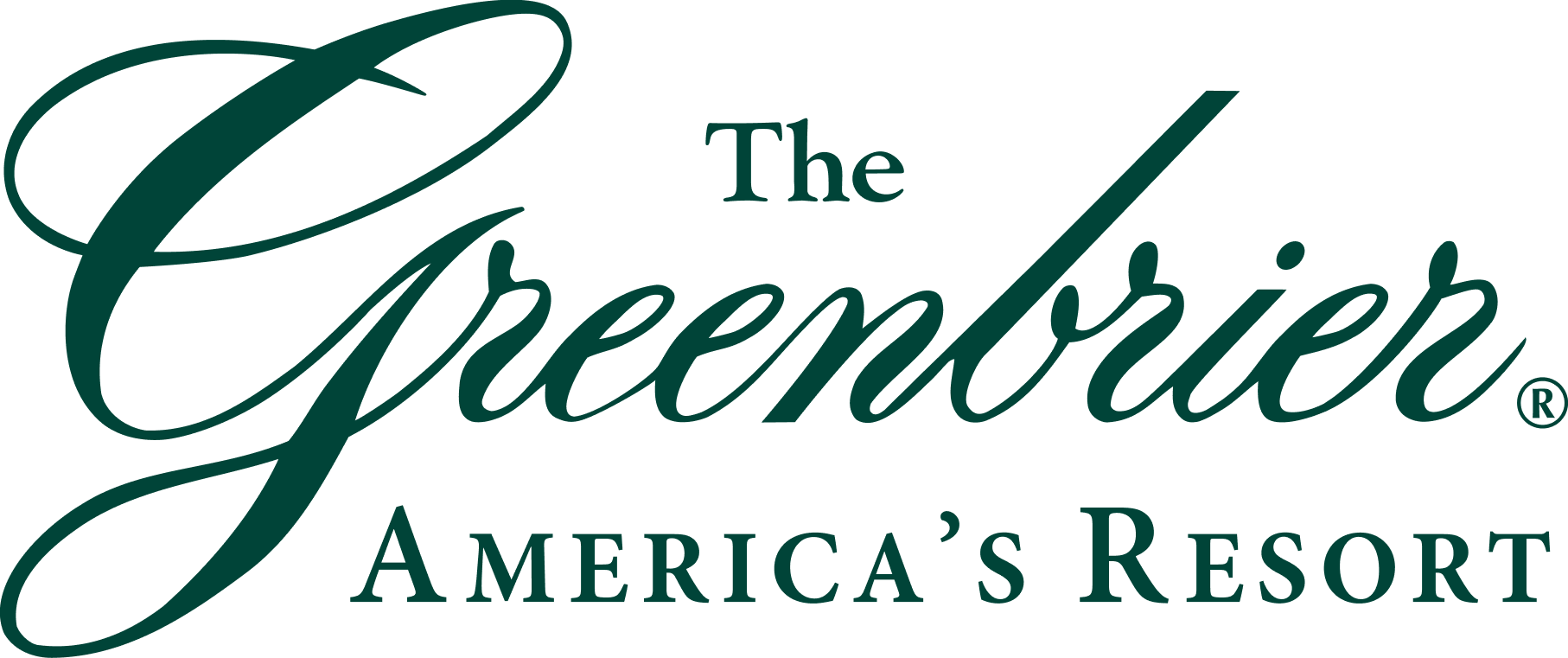

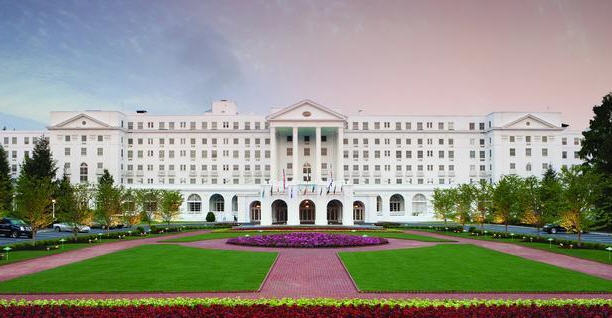
- Main entrance in 2011

General information
- Location: 101 Main Street West, White Sulphur Springs, West Virginia, U.S.
- Opened: September 25, 1913
- Owner: Kennedy Lewis Investment Management, Justice Family Group

Technical details
- Grounds: 11,000 acres (4,500 ha)

Other information
- Number of rooms: 710
- Number of suites: 33
- Number of restaurants: 9
- Number of bars: 11

Website
- greenbrier.com
- The Greenbrier
- U.S. National Register of Historic Places
- U.S. National Historic Landmark District
- Architect: John H. B. Latrobe et al.
- Architectural style: Classical revival, Federal
- NRHP reference No.: 74002000

Significant dates
- Added to NRHP: October 9, 1974
- Designated NHLD: June 21, 1990

The Greenbrier is a luxury resort located in the Allegheny Mountains near White Sulphur Springs in Greenbrier County, West Virginia, United States.

Since 1778, visitors have traveled to this part of the state to "take the waters" of the area. Today, the Greenbrier is situated on 11,000 acres (4,500 ha) of land with 710 guest rooms, 20 restaurants and lounges, more than 55 indoor and outdoor activities and sports, and more than 35 retail shops.

The Greenbrier was built in 1913 by the Chesapeake and Ohio Railway and was owned for much of its history by that company and its successors, Chessie System and CSX Corporation. After years of losses, CSX had the hotel file for bankruptcy protection in 2009. Justice Family Group, LLC, owned by coal baron Jim Justice, bought the property and guaranteed all debts, resulting in dismissal of the bankruptcy protection. Justice, later the governor of West Virginia, and U.S. Senator, promised to return the hotel to its former status as a five-star resort. In 2026, Kennedy Lewis Investment Management bought a controlling interest in the resort.

The most recent U.S. president to stay at the Greenbrier during his term is Dwight D. Eisenhower. Many presidents (28) have stayed at the hotel. The Presidents' Cottage Museum houses exhibits about presidential visits and the history of the Greenbrier. The Greenbrier is the site of a massive underground bunker meant to serve as an emergency shelter for the United States Congress during the Cold War. The bunker was code named "Project Greek Island".

== History ==
=== Early development ===
A spring of sulphur water is at the center of the property, surrounded by the white-columned spring house, topped by the green dome that has been the symbol of the Greenbrier for generations. Beginning in 1778, Mrs. Anderson, a local pioneer, adopted the local Native American tradition of "taking the waters" to relieve her chronic rheumatism. Based on this resource, for the first 125 years, the resort was known by the name White Sulphur Springs. It was a destination for people during the summers who wanted to escape coastal heat and diseases. As the resort developed, cottages were built, many of which still stand. Notable guests included Martin Van Buren and Henry Clay.

In 1858, the Grand Central Hotel was built. It came to be known as "The White" and, later, "The Old White". During the Civil War, as control of the property passed between the Confederate Army and the Union Army, it was almost burned to the ground. After the Civil War, the resort reopened under Confederate Major Cornelius Boyle and became a vacation place for Southerners and Northerners alike. The "White Sulphur Manifesto", the only political paper published by Confederate General Robert E. Lee after the Civil War, advocated the merging of the two sides. The resort became a center of regional post-war society after the arrival of the railroad, which provided direct service to the resort's gates by 1869.

=== The Greenbrier ===
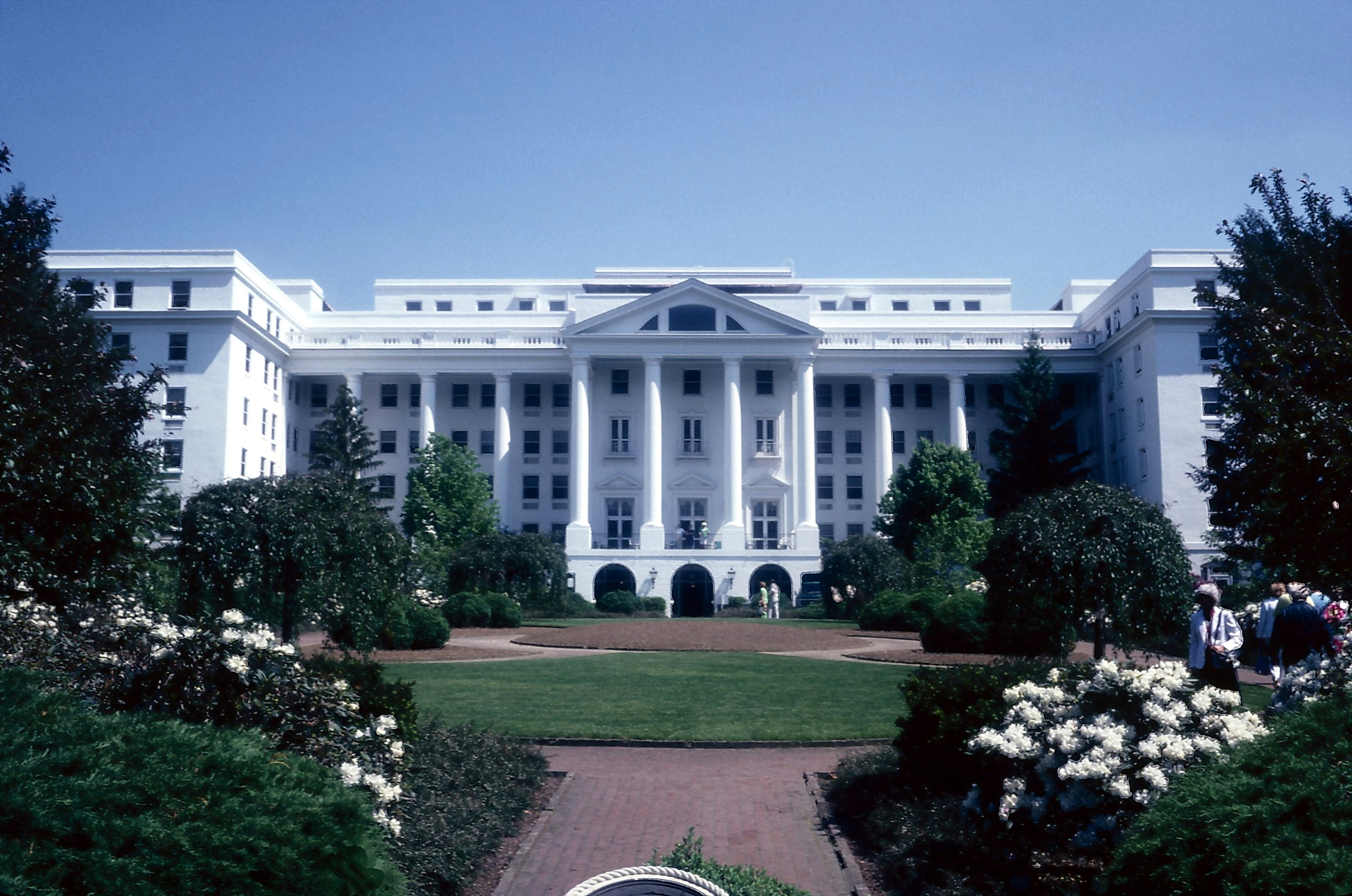
The Greenbrier Hotel, 1981

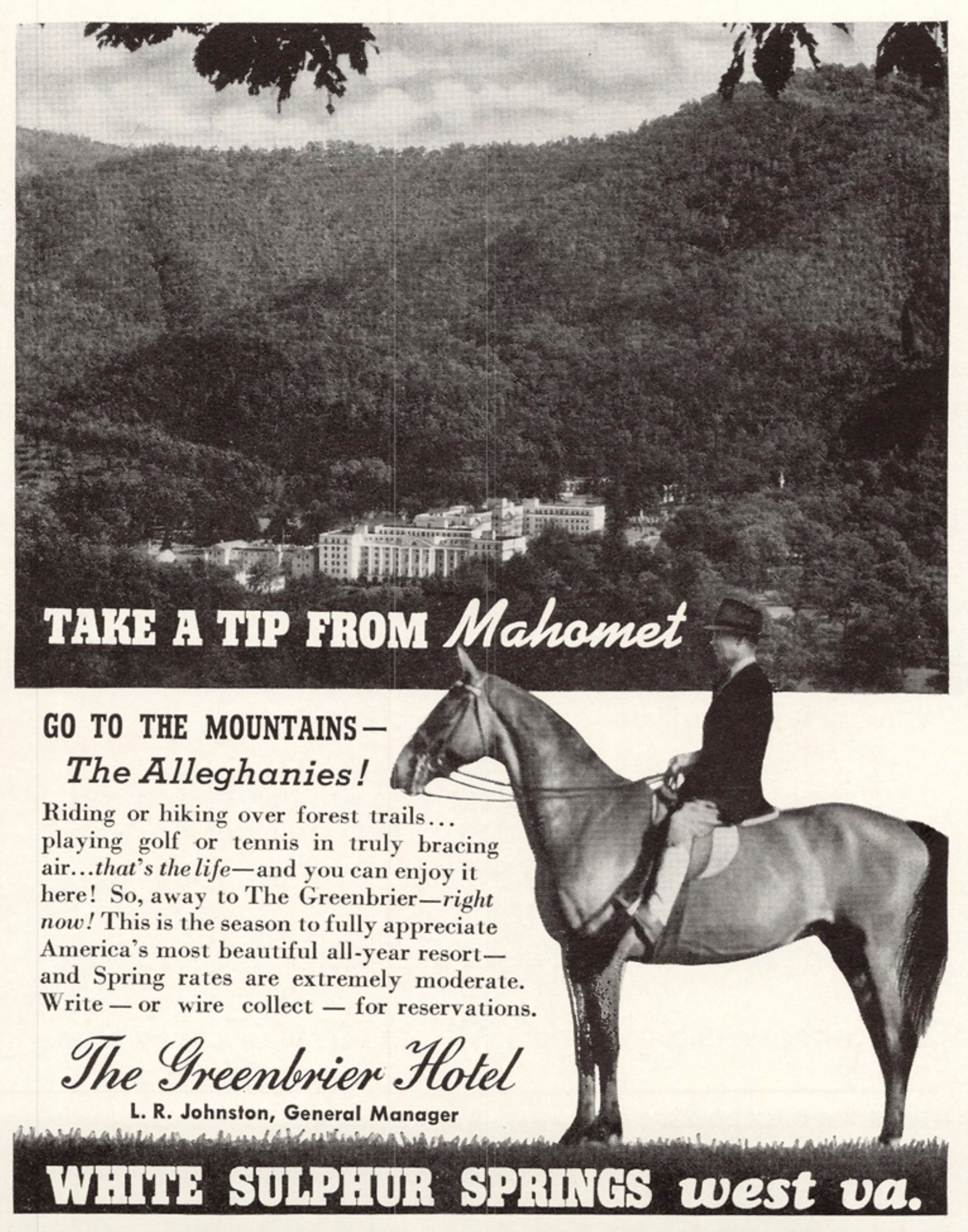
Promotion by Loren Johnston, 1940

In 1910, the Chesapeake & Ohio Railroad purchased the property and added the current bath wing, which opened in 1911. C&O's improvements also included a six-story, 250-room hotel, the central wing of the present hotel. Designed by Frederick Julius Sterner, it opened on September 25, 1913. At this time, what had been for decades a summer establishment was converted to a year-round resort, and the name was changed to The Greenbrier, for neighboring Greenbrier County, West Virginia. The surrounding town had already incorporated in 1909 as White Sulphur Springs, the name the resort used previously. The railroad introduced the game of golf, which became a defining feature of the resort. The first small course opened in 1910, and a full 18-hole course, designed by Charles B. Macdonald, in 1913. That course is today known as "The Old White TPC". The Old White Hotel structure was demolished in 1922, because it failed to meet fire codes. In 1931, the north wing was added, crossing the original 1913 wing like a "T", nearly doubling the hotel's size.

Just after the United States entered World War II, the resort was called on December 17, 1941 to serve as a relocation center for Axis diplomats held as enemies of the United States. The first detainees were German; later, they were joined by Japanese diplomats previously kept at The Homestead in Hot Springs, Virginia.

The hotel briefly reopened for the 1942 vacation season, but was soon after commandeered by the U.S. Army for use as a hospital. The Army paid $3.3 million for the resort, which had been valued at $5.4 million, and took over control of the property on September 1, 1942. They converted the Greenbrier to the 2000-bed Ashford General Hospital, named for Bailey Ashford. The hospital opened on October 16, 1943 and treated nearly 25,000 patients, before closing on June 30, 1946. The property was then sold back to the C&O railroad, for just under the $3.3 million they had been paid in 1942.

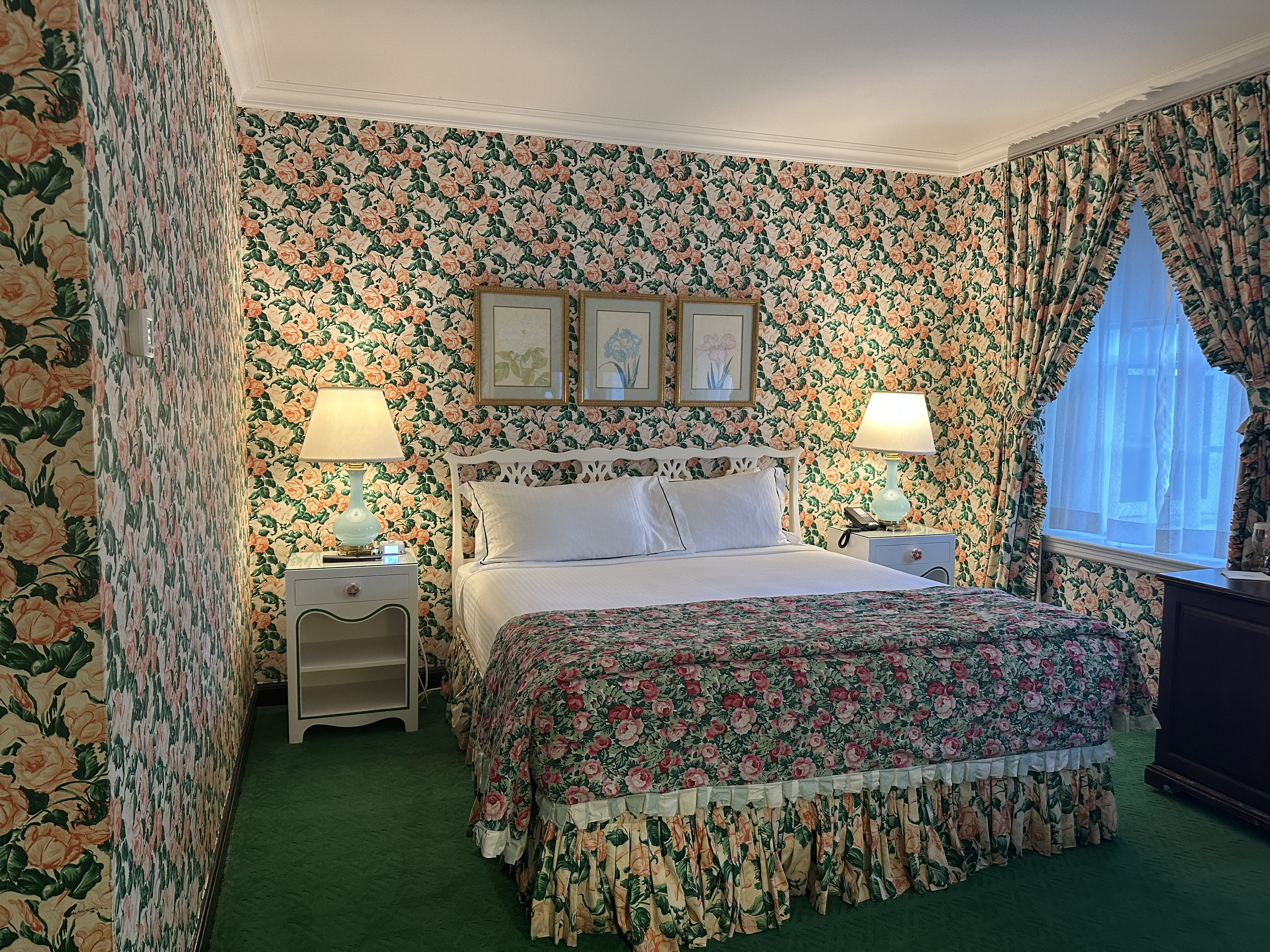
Dorothy Draper interior at the Greenbrier

C&O hired internationally renowned interior designer Dorothy Draper to redecorate and restore the Greenbrier. Draper oversaw every element of the property's design, combining bold colors, classical influences, and modern touches. The Greenbrier's reopening, celebrated from April 15 to April 18, 1948, was an international social event. Notable attendees included the Duke of Windsor and his wife, Wallis Simpson (who honeymooned with her first husband at the Greenbrier in 1916), Bing Crosby, and members of the Kennedy family. The resort has also hosted foreign dignitaries, including Jawaharlal Nehru, Indira Gandhi, and Prince Rainier and Princess Grace of Monaco, high-level discussions on the allocation of the Allies' resources during World War II, and post-war North American talks in 1955.

=== The Bunker ===
In the late 1950s, the U.S. government approached the Greenbrier for the creation of a secret emergency relocation center to house Congress in the event of a nuclear holocaust. The classified underground facility, "Project Greek Island", was built at the same time as the West Virginia Wing, an above-ground hotel addition, from 1959 to 1962.

The bunker was kept stocked with supplies for thirty years, but was never used as an emergency location, and its existence was not acknowledged by the government. After Ted Gup of The Washington Post reported on it in 1992, the government immediately decommissioned the bunker. Following renovations, much of the space is now used as a data storage facility by CSX IP for the private sector, while a portion is open to the public as a tourist attraction, in which visitors can tour the now declassified facilities, known as The Bunker.

=== Justice family ownership ===
On March 20, 2009, the resort filed for bankruptcy, listing debts of up to $500 million and assets of $100 million. It was hurt by competition from other resorts, and declining post-war traffic as patrons shifted to destinations they could reach by automobile. The resort lost $35 million in 2008 and laid off 650 employees, or half its workforce. After an initial announcement of a sale to Marriott, Justice Family Group, LLC purchased the resort for $20 million. Marriott asserted a valid contract, but settled with Justice. The resort closed briefly after the 2016 West Virginia flood, though flood victims were offered rooms in the hotel.

When Justice was elected governor in 2017, his daughter took over day-to-day control at Greenbrier. The Greenbrier was used as collateral for loans taken out by the Justice family, including to both Carter Bank & Trust as well as a $50 million loan from JPMorgan Chase, and tax liens were placed on other Justice properties for non-payment of taxes, for which the Justices were in court several times. In 2024, the hotel narrowly avoided foreclosure, after JP Morgan Chase sold a loan it held to Beltway Capital, which declared The Greenbrier in default.

In 2026, a subsidiary of TRT Holdings, parent company of Omni Hotels & Resorts, acquired $289 million in past‑due, first‑lien loans tied to the Greenbrier from Carter Bank & Trust. The purchase did not transfer ownership of the resort. However, White Sulphur Springs Holdings LLC, the TRT subsidiary that acquired the debt, later filed in federal court seeking appointment of a receiver to take control of the property. The Justice family subsequently filed a separate lawsuit in state court alleging that TRT and Carter Bank acted improperly in their efforts to assume control of the resort.

In July 2026, The Justice Family Group sold a 51% controlling interest in the resort to Kennedy Lewis Investment Management, creating a $500 million joint venture to operate the property. The deal also involved the dismissal of the ongoing court conflicts with White Sulphur Springs Holdings.

== Facilities ==
=== Athletics ===
The Greenbrier's location in the eastern United States, along with its hotel accommodations and athletic facilities including golf, tennis, and basketball courts, has made it a frequent training site for professional sports teams.

Notable teams that used The Greenbrier facilities
Team	Year(s)	Utilized
New Orleans Saints	2014-2016	Training camp
New Orleans Pelicans	2015	Training camp
New England Patriots	2017	Training camp
Houston Texans	2017 & 2025	Training camp
San Francisco 49ers	2020-2022	East coast regular season games
Cleveland Browns	2023-2025	Training camp
Iraq national football team	2026	2026 FIFA World Cup
New York Giants	2026	Training camp

==== Basketball ====
The Greenbrier has served as a venue for high school, NCAA, and NBA basketball as well as hosting training camps, tournaments, and games over the years. Since 2024, it has served as the primary venue for the Greenbrier Tip-Off, a preseason NCAA men's basketball tournament. The resort has also frequently hosted West Virginia University men's and women's basketball games.

==== Gridiron football ====
In 2011, Justice announced plans to construct the Greenbrier Medical Institute, a large-scale medical facility. Construction of the first stage began in May 2012. The project was meant to attract a National Football League team that would hold its annual training camp at the Greenbrier. In 2014, the hotel committed to build three football fields and other facilities for the New Orleans Saints; the agreement lasted three years.

In 2017, The Spring League, which evolved into the USFL, held six of the seven games in its inaugural season at the Greenbrier.

==== Golf ====
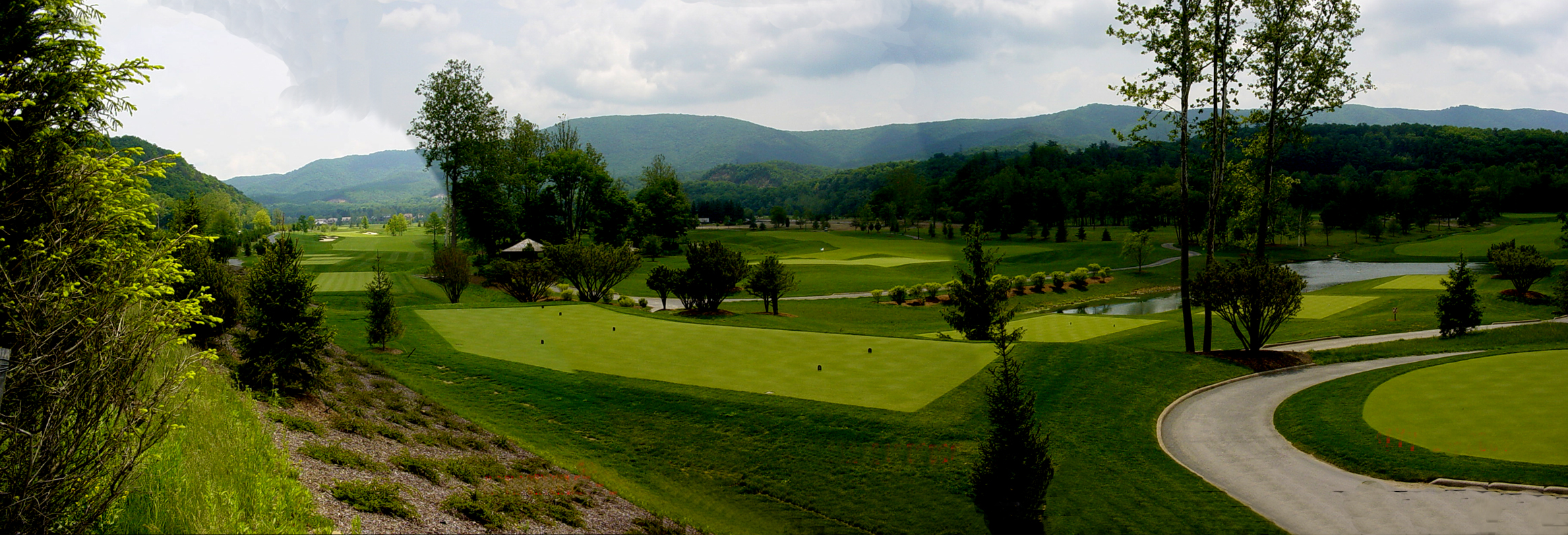
Golf course at the Greenbrier Hotel, 2004

The resort has a significant place in the history of golf. The original nine holes were designed by Alexander H. Findlay. In 1944, Sam Snead became the head golf professional at Greenbrier and in retirement held the position of pro emeritus. In the 21st century, that title has been held by Tom Watson and Lee Trevino.

The Greenbrier was the site of the 1979 Ryder Cup, the first to be contested under the format of United States versus Europe, which continues, and hosted the 1994 Solheim Cup, the women's equivalent. The Greenbrier American Express Championship on the Senior PGA Tour (now the PGA Tour Champions) was held from 1985-1987.

The Greenbrier Classic began in 2010. On March 28, 2011, The Old White Course became a TPC course. The 2016 event was canceled due to flooding. All four golf courses on the property were damaged by the flood. On July 12, 2016, one modified course opened for play. In 2020, the PGA Tour canceled its TPC affiliation with the Greenbrier, which hosted an LIV Golf event in 2023.

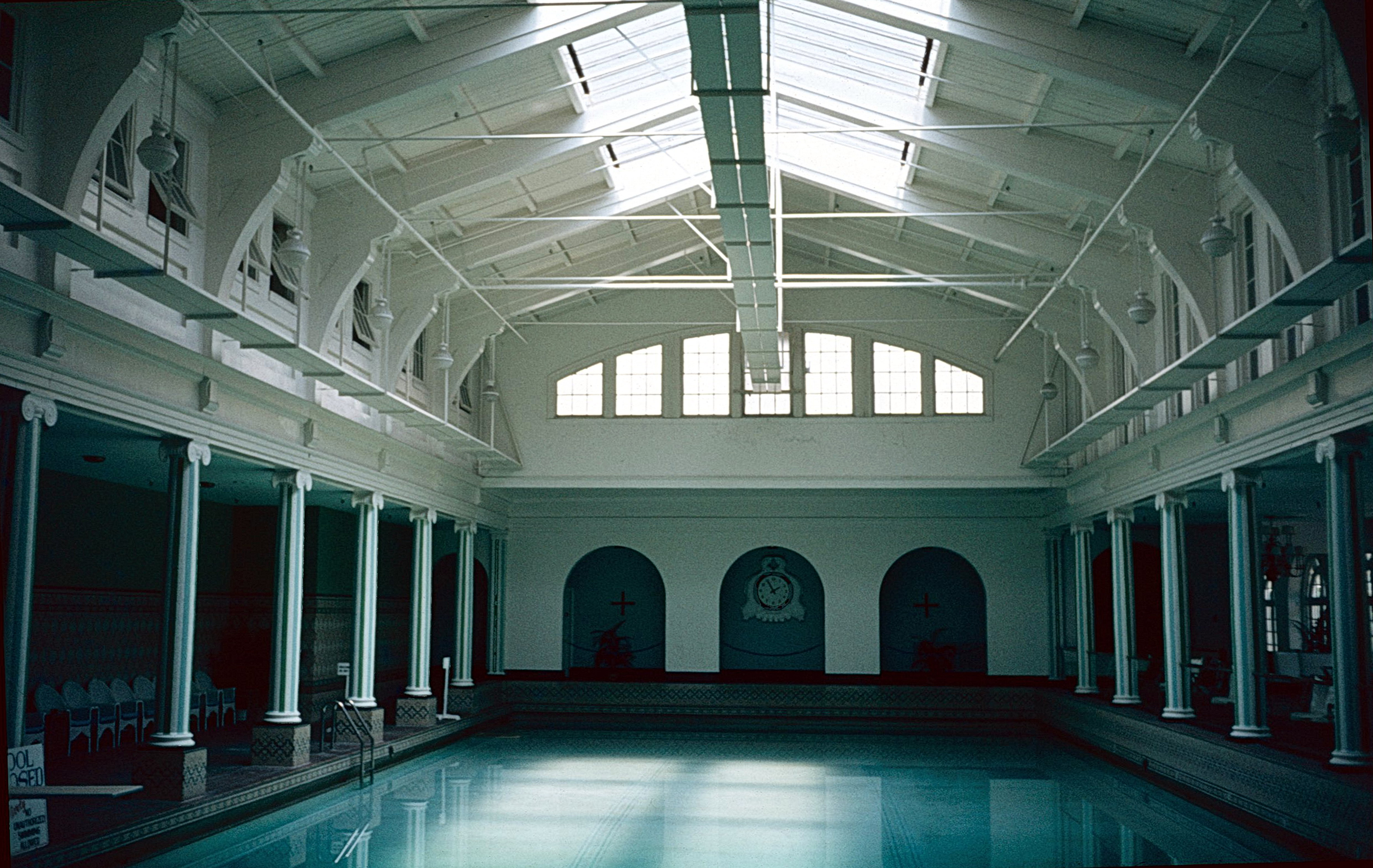
The indoor swimming pool at Greenbrier Hotel, 1981

==== Other ====
The adjacent Greenbrier Clinic, independent of the hotel since 1971, has served as an executive health facility since 1948. The Greenbrier hosts outdoor and indoor swimming pools.

The resort is home to a 2,500-seat tennis stadium, five Har-Tru outdoor courts and five Deco-Turf indoor courts. As a result of the COVID-19 pandemic, all matches during the 2020 World TeamTennis season were held at the Greenbrier.

=== The Casino Club at the Greenbrier ===
In 2008, voters narrowly approved a referendum that would permit casino-style gambling at the hotel. The Justice family promised that gambling facilities at the resort would be "tasteful" if established. The temporary Tavern Casino opened in 2009, followed by the permanent Casino Club at the Greenbrier in 2010. Simulcast horse racing and associated betting were added in 2013.

== In popular culture ==
- Fallout 76, a video game, features a location known as "The Whitespring Resort" strongly resembling the exterior and interior of the Greenbrier, including the government bunker.
- Too Many Cooks, a 1938 murder mystery by Rex Stout, takes place at the Kanawha Spa, modeled after the Greenbrier. Nero Wolfe and Archie Goodwin attend a gathering of world-renowned chefs, one of whom is murdered. The Wolfe Pack has held several gourmet dinners at the Greenbrier in honor of the novel.
- Entombed, a 2010 novel by Brian Keene, takes place in a fictionalized West Virginia hotel with a bunker beneath, inspired by the Greenbrier.
- The Grand Design, a 2022 novel by Joy Callaway, is a fictionalized life story of Dorothy Draper during her redesign of the Greenbrier, published by HarperCollins.
- Shadow of the Greenbrier, a novel by Emily Matchar, tells the story of four generations of a Jewish family living near the Greenbrier during key moments in the resort's history. It was published by G. P. Putnam's Sons in 2024.
- Mary Stevens, M.D., was shot in The Greenbrier

== Gallery ==
The Greenbrier

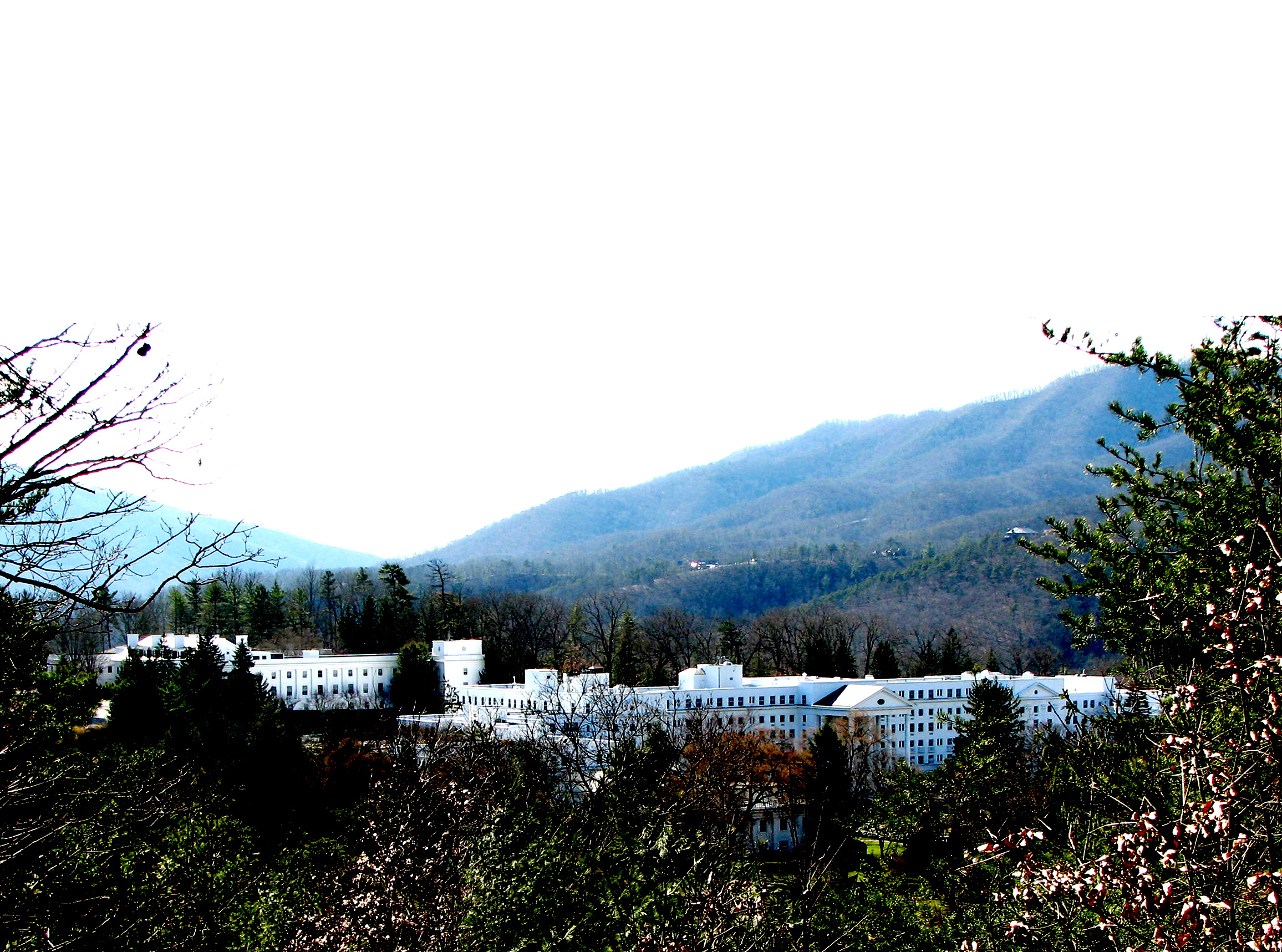
The sprawling resort complex, surrounded by mountains

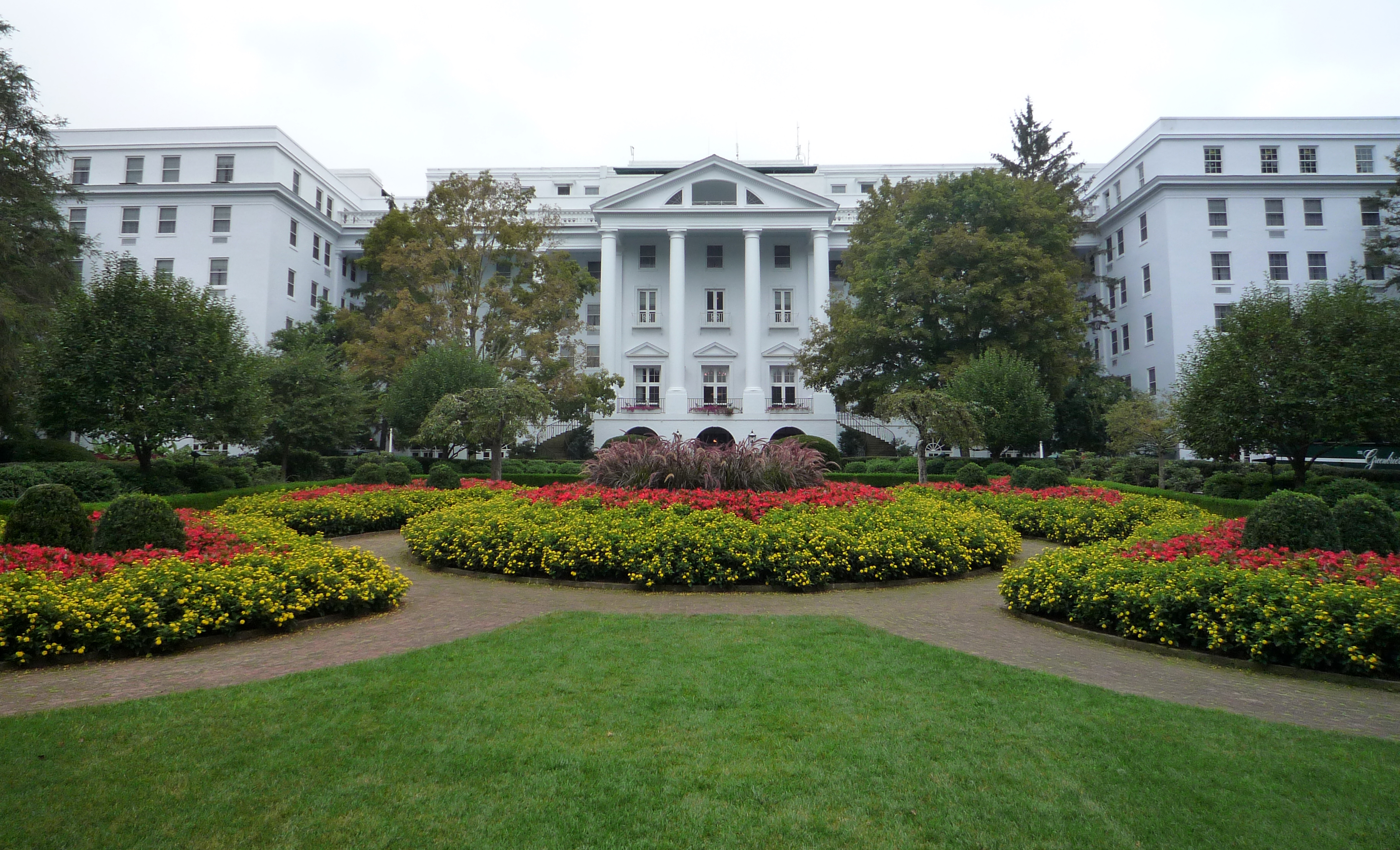
North entrance

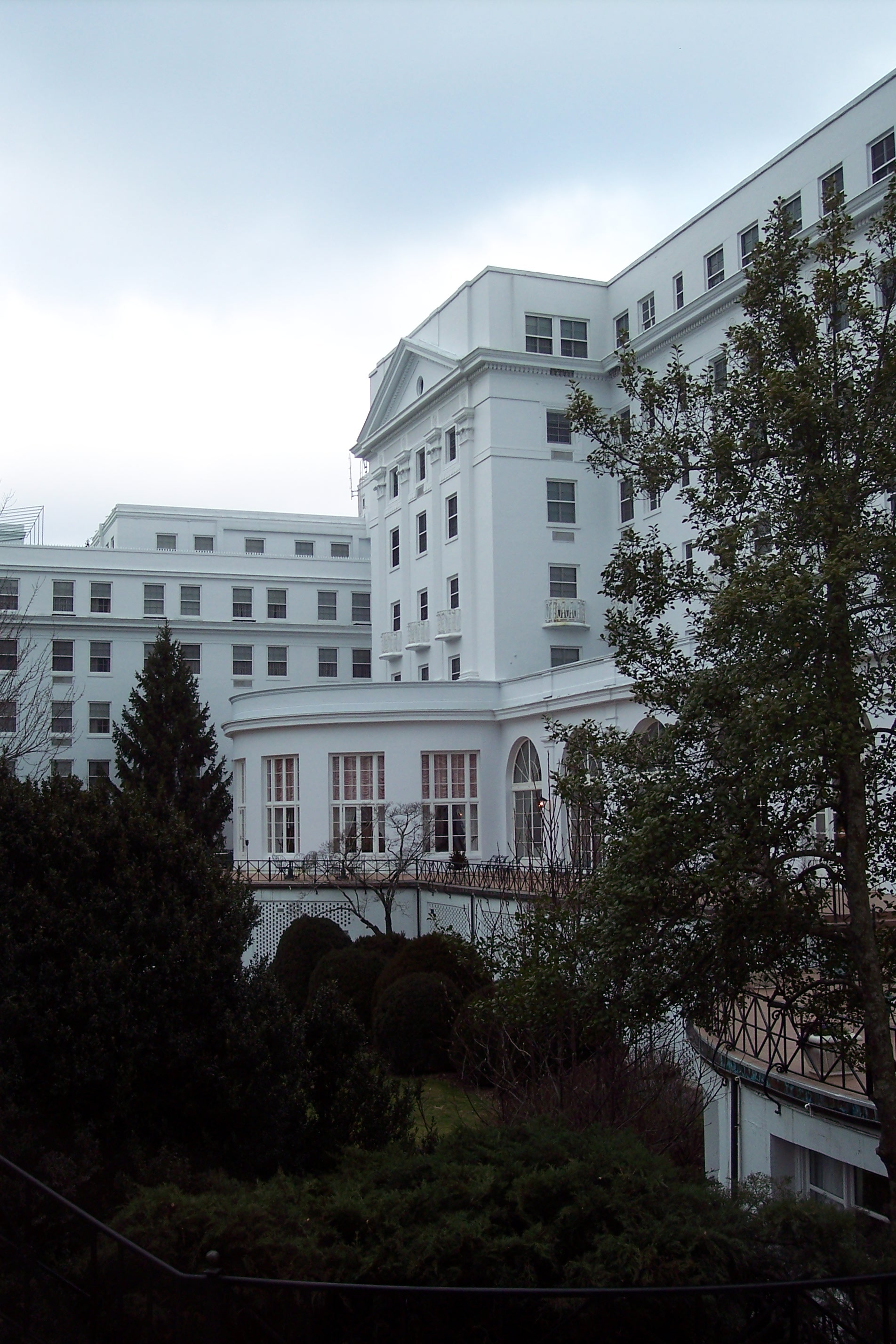
The back patio

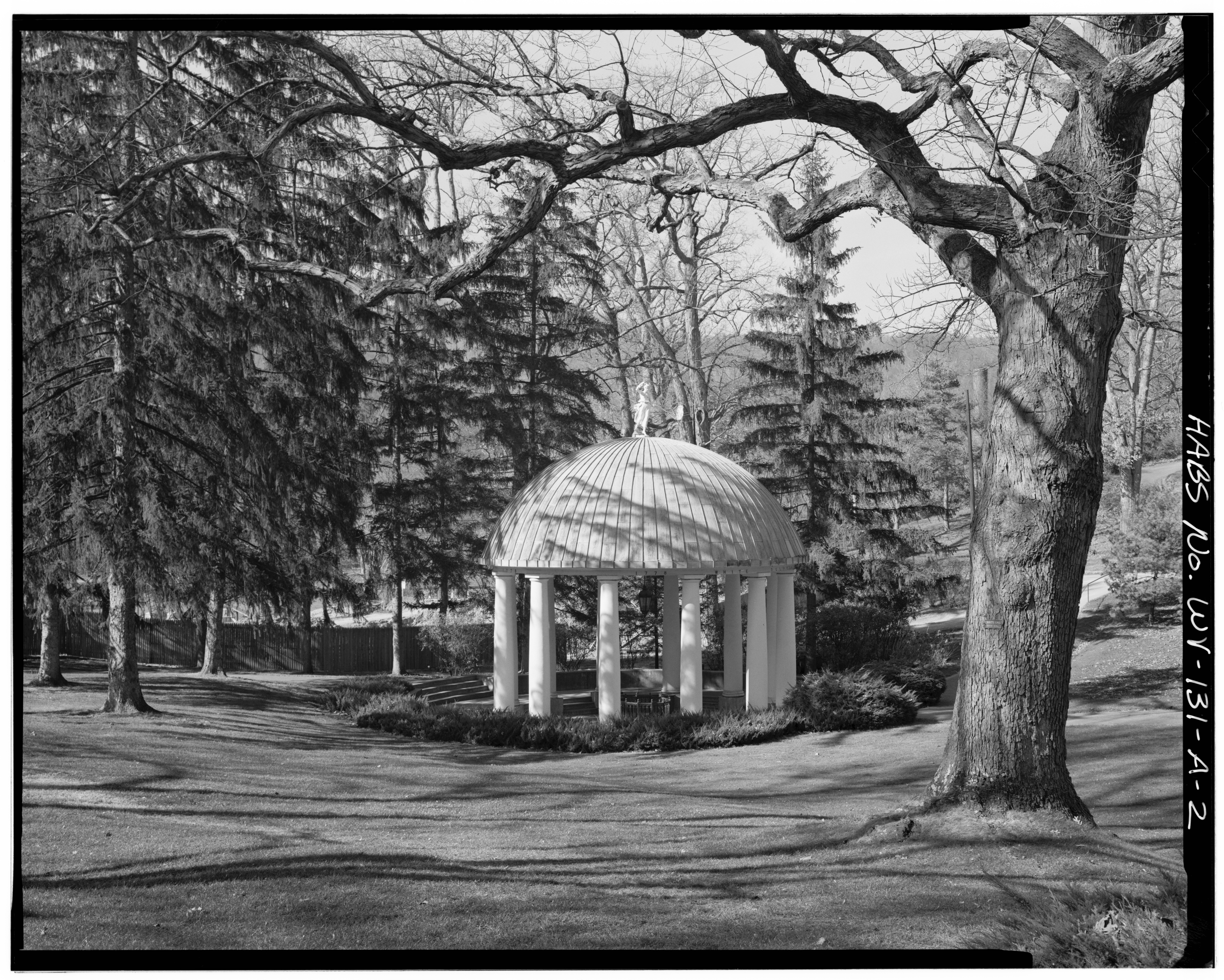
The historic springhouse

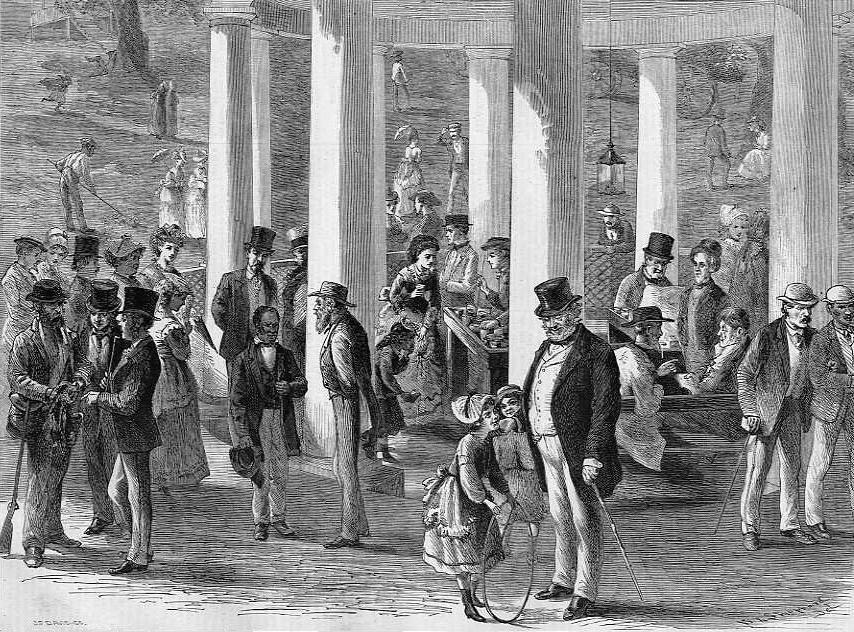
At White Sulphur Springs, 1870

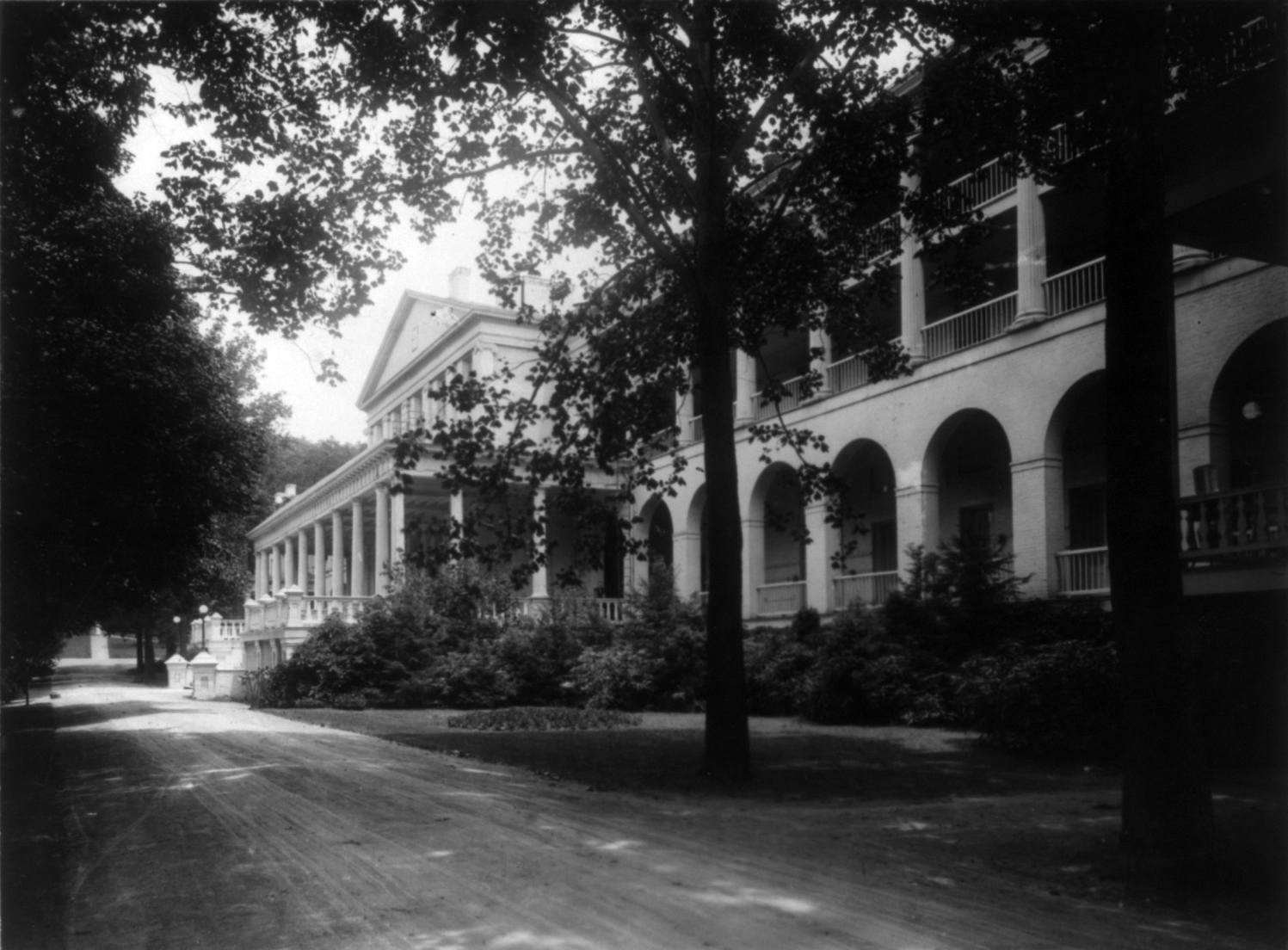
"The Old White" in 1916

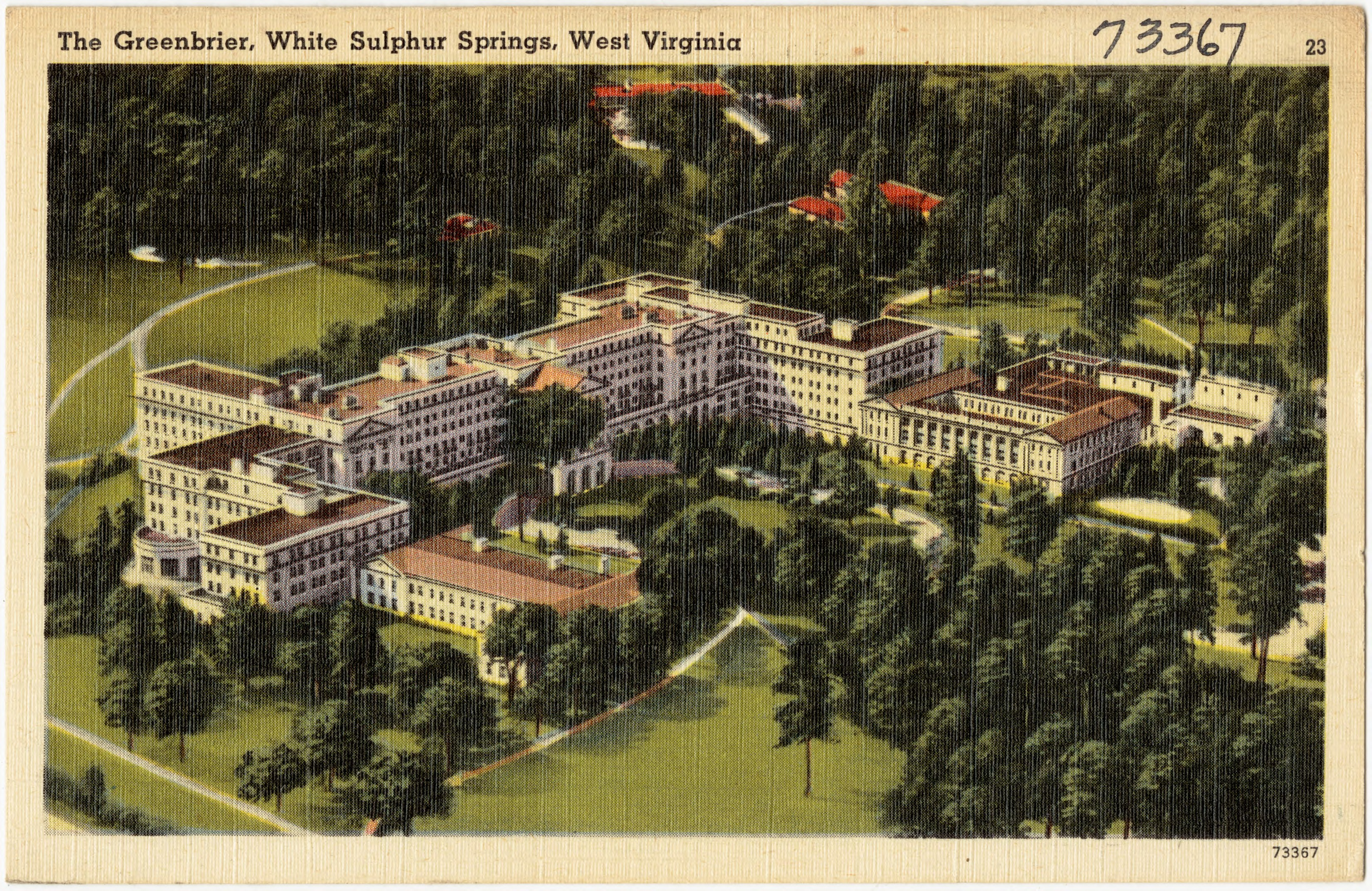
The Greenbrier in the late 1930s, showing the central 1913 wing, the back side of the 1931 north wing, and the 1911 bath wing on the right

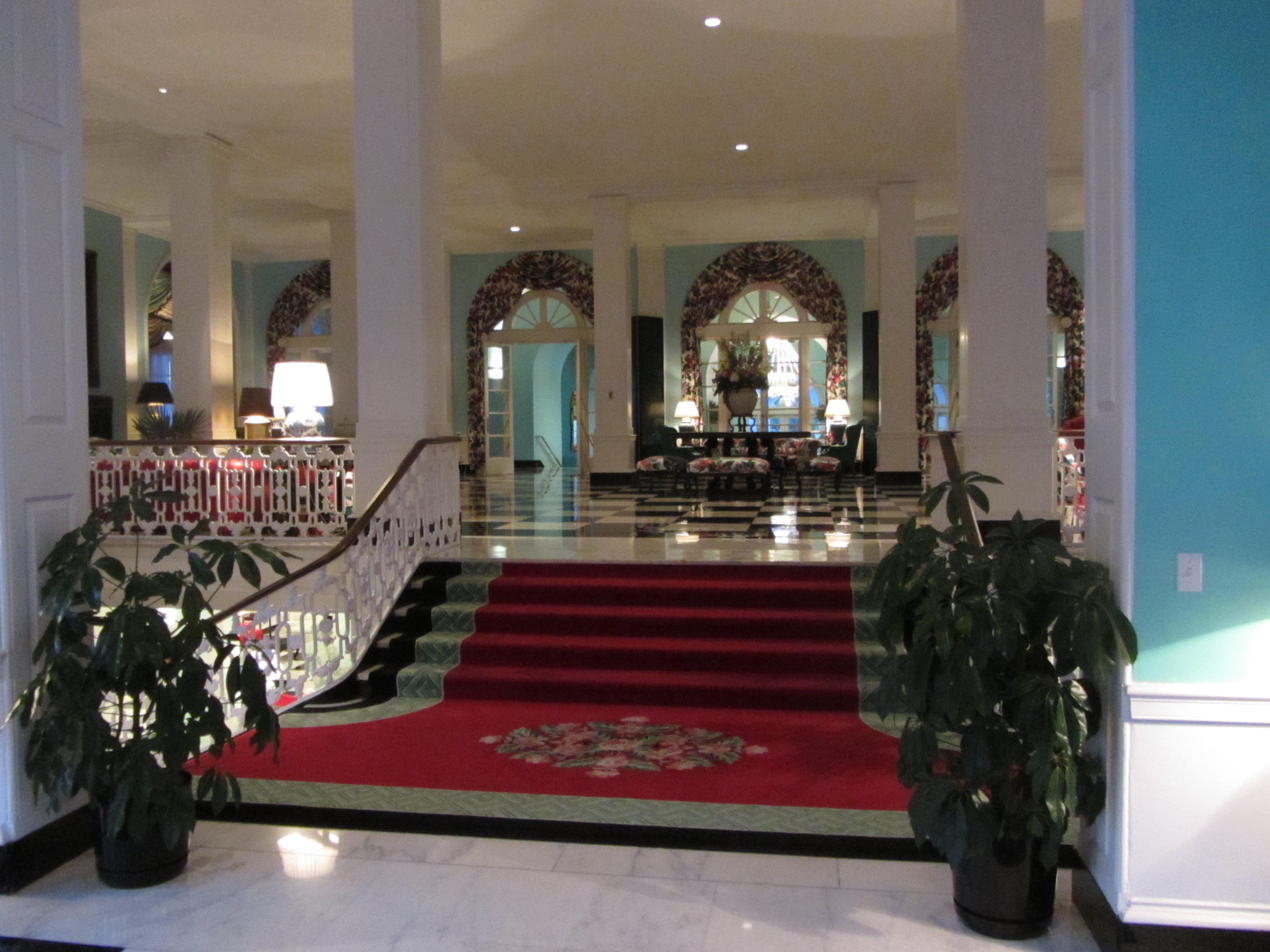
An interior view

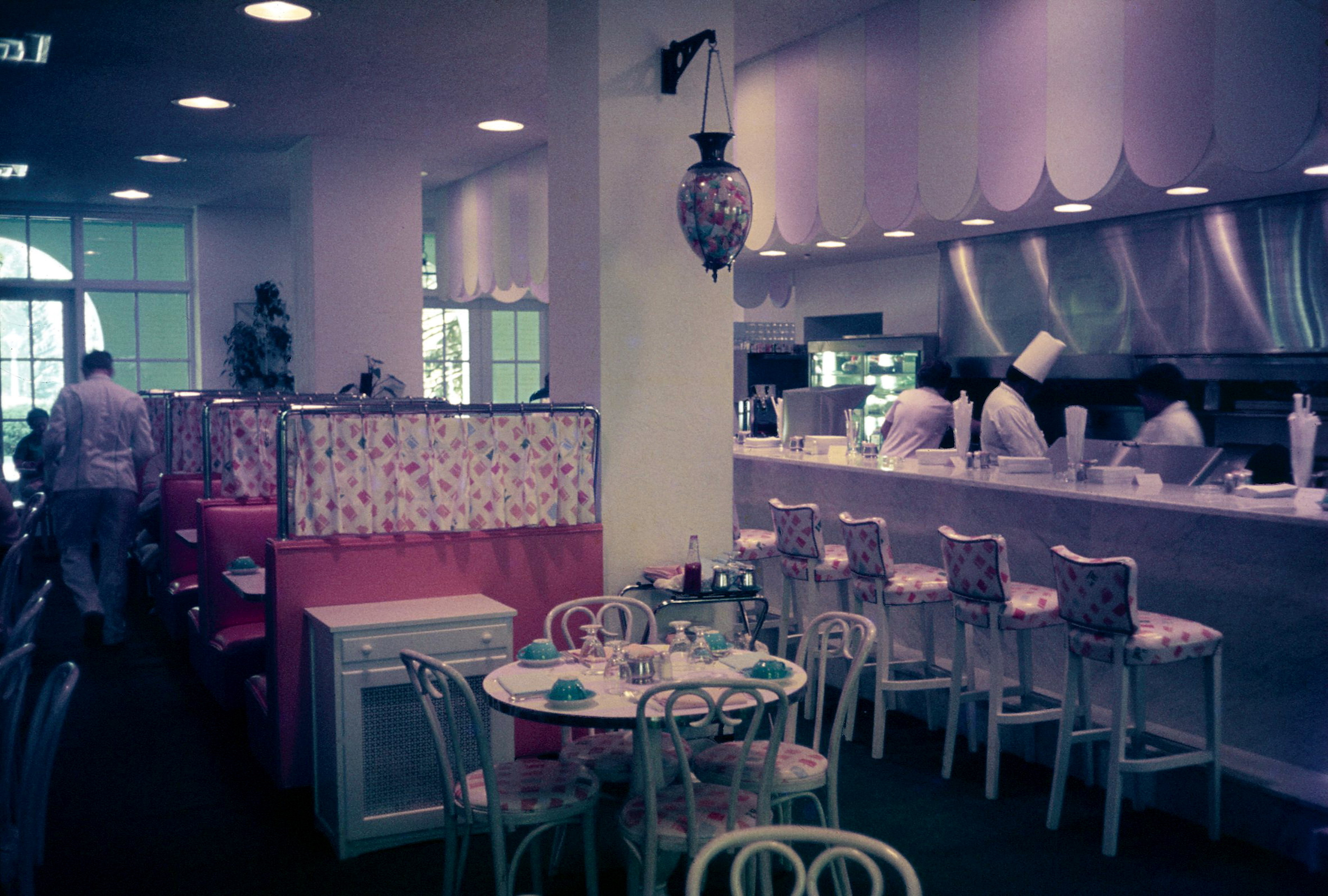
The Greenbrier Hotel, Restaurant with original Dorothy Draper design (1981)

== See also ==
- List of casinos in West Virginia
- List of casinos in the United States
- List of casino hotels
- Mount Weather Emergency Operations Center
- Raven Rock Mountain Complex
- Greenbrier Presidential Express, a train that was planned to run between Washington, D.C., and White Sulphur Springs

== Bibliography ==
- Conte, Robert S. The History of the Greenbrier: America's Resort. Charleston, W. Va: Published for the Greenbrier by Pictorial Histories Pub. Co, 1989. https://www.worldcat.org/oclc/21426566
- Greenbrier (White Sulphur Springs, W. Va.). In America It's The Greenbrier: "Famous Since 1778", White Sulphur Springs West Virginia. [White Sulphur Springs, W. Va.]: [The Greenbrier], 1930. Signed, in print, L.R. Johnston, General Manager ... Possibly a proof copy. Printed as [12] p. on 2 sheets (45 x 58 cm. or smaller) with text on one side of sheet only. https://www.worldcat.org/oclc/63110504
- Greenbrier (White Sulphur Springs, W. Va.). The Greenbrier Historical Heritage: White Sulphur Springs, West Virginia : Where the Vacation Season Never Ends. [White Sulphur Springs, W. Va.]: [The Greenbrier], 1965. https://www.worldcat.org/oclc/76875121
- Greenbrier White Sulphur Springs Company. A Treatise on the White Sulphur Springs and Its Waters, 1892. [Richmond, Va.]: [A. Hoenx], 1892. https://www.worldcat.org/oclc/26019669
- Greenbrier Hotel, White Sulphur Springs, W. Va. General Robert E. Lee at White Sulphur Springs, 1867–'68–'69. [White Sulphur Springs, W. Va.]: [The Greenbrier], 1932. https://www.worldcat.org/oclc/6366418
- Greenbrier (White Sulphur Springs, W. Va.). The Portico. White Sulphur Springs, W. Va: The Greenbrier, 1932. "Published weekly, during the season. Sub-title: "Tales of the 'Old White' and Notes from the Greenbrier." Editor: Alice Elizabeth Gasaway, The Greenbrier ..." https://www.worldcat.org/oclc/47804280
- Greenbrier (White Sulphur Springs, W. Va.), and Chesapeake and Ohio Railway Company. Green-Brier White Sulphur Springs, 1900. [White Sulphur Springs, W. Va.]: [Greenbrier], 1900. Contains a description of the hotel (with rates), society and its amusements and scenery, with an analysis of the water, a Bird's eye view of the White Sulphur Springs, and information on Chesapeake and Ohio's train service to the area. https://www.worldcat.org/oclc/233974083
- Keefer, Louis E. Shangri-La for Wounded Soldiers: The Greenbrier As a World War II Army Hospital. Reston, VA: Cotu Pub, 1995.
- MacCorkle, William Alexander. The White Sulphur Springs; The Traditions, History, and Social Life of the Greenbriar White Sulphur Springs. New York: The Neale Publishing Company, 1916. https://www.worldcat.org/oclc/1581713
- Miscellaneous Materials About Greenbrier, White Sulphur Springs, West Virginia. Includes Informational Brochures, Menus, Calendars, Postcards. 1940. Artist sees the Greenbrier; Roads and trails on the estate and in the vicinity of the Greenbrier, White Sulphur Springs, West Virginia; White Sulphur Springs, the Greenbrier and cottages; Greenbrier overture; Follow the Old Buffalo and Seneca trails to White Sulphur Springs, West Virginia; Baths and medical department of the Greenbrier, White Sulphur Springs, West Virginia; America's most beautiful all-year-resort, the Greenbrier and cottages; Greenbrier calendar; Robert E. Lee week; Old White arts school and colony; Old White Art Gallery; President's cottage, 1835–1932; White Sulphur for conventions. https://www.worldcat.org/oclc/647900978
- Moorman, J. J. Virginia White Sulphur Springs With the Analysis of Its Waters, the Diseases to Which They Are Applicable, and Some Account of Society and Its Amusements at the Springs. Baltimore: Kelly, Piet, 1869. https://www.worldcat.org/oclc/10845672
- Moorman, J. J. A Brief Notice of a Portion of a Work by William Burke, Entitled "The Mineral Springs of Western Virginia": With Preliminary Remarks on the Relative Virtues of the Saline and Gaseous Contents of the White Sulphur Water. Philadelphia: Printed by Merrihew and Thompson, 1843. https://www.worldcat.org/oclc/14828853
- Olcott, William. The Greenbrier Heritage. [Philadelphia?]: [Arndt, Preston, Chapin, Lamb & Keen], 1967. https://www.worldcat.org/oclc/564643
- Panel Descriptions of the Virginia Room. The Greenbrier, White Sulphur Springs, W. Va. [White Sulpher Springs, W. Va.]: [The Greenbrier], 1931. https://www.worldcat.org/oclc/47745488
- Pencil, Mark. White Sulphur Papers, or, Life at the Springs of Western Virginia. New York: S. Colman, 1839. https://www.worldcat.org/oclc/12415888
- Rains, David. The History of the White Sulphur Springs, West Virginia, Famous Since 1778, And The Greenbrier and Cottages. Roanoke, Va: Stone Print. and manufacturing Co, 1939. https://www.worldcat.org/oclc/5576726
- Smith, Wm. P. Topographical Map of a Portion of the White Sulphur Springs Tract in Greenbrier County, West Virginia. [United States]: [publisher not identified], 1875. https://www.worldcat.org/oclc/56966082
- Topographic Map of White Sulphur Springs, Greenbrier County, West Virginia. [White Sulphur Springs, W. Va.?]: [publisher not identified], 1970. https://www.worldcat.org/oclc/13946601
