= White Sulphur Springs, West Virginia =

City in West Virginia, US

- City
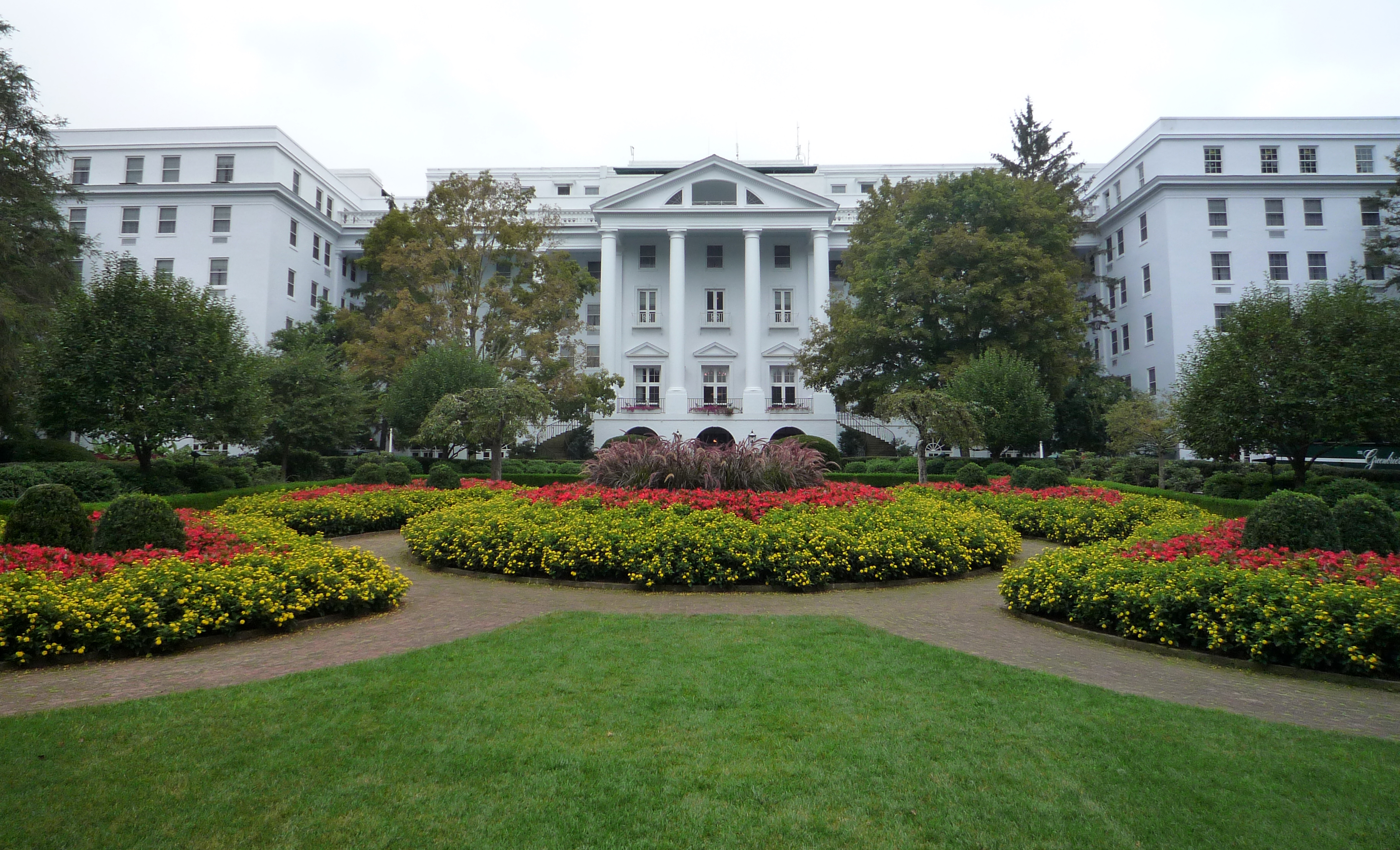
- The Greenbrier
- Nickname: Spa City
- Motto: Home of the Greenbrier Resort
- Location of White Sulphur Springs in Greenbrier County, West Virginia

- Location in West Virginia Location in the United States
- Coordinates: 37°47′54″N 80°18′01″W
- Country: United States
- State: West Virginia
- County: Greenbrier
- Incorporated: 1909

Government
  - Mayor: Kathy Glover
  - City Council: David Dillion Audrey Vanburen Thomas Taylor Ryan Lockhart Ted Humphreys GP Parker

Area
  - Total: 1.90 sq mi (4.91 km^{2})
  - Land: 1.87 sq mi (4.85 km^{2})
  - Water: 0.023 sq mi (0.06 km^{2})
- Elevation: 1,850 ft (560 m)

Population (2020)
  - Total: 2,221
  - Estimate (2021): 2,198
  - Density: 1,255.0/sq mi (484.56/km^{2})
- Time zone: UTC-5 (Eastern (EST))
  - Summer (DST): UTC-4 (EDT)
- ZIP code: 24986
- Area codes: 304, 681
- FIPS code: 54-86812
- GNIS feature ID: 2390673
- Website: whitesulphurspringswv.org

White Sulphur Springs is a city in Greenbrier County, West Virginia, United States. The population was 2,231 at the 2020 census. The city emblem consists of five dandelion flowers and the citizens celebrate spring with an annual Dandelion Festival.

== History ==
White Sulphur Springs grew in the first half of the nineteenth century as the southern "Queen of the Watering Places". The springs resort first became the standard summer destination for wealthy Virginia Low Country residents seeking reprieve from heat, humidity, and disease of the "sickly season". As its popularity increased and it gained status as a socially exclusive site, the springs attracted elite guests from all over.

The resort, now known as The Greenbrier, remains one of the country's most luxurious and exclusive resorts. For many years, Sam Snead was the resort's golf pro and later golf pro emeritus. The resort has another significant place in golf history; in 1979, it hosted the first Ryder Cup to feature the current competitive setup of the United States and European sides. Golf in the United States began near White Sulphur Springs when the Montague family founded Oakhurst Links in 1884, making it the oldest organized golf club in the country. In 2010, the Greenbrier hosted the inaugural PGA Greenbrier Classic.

In 1992 The Washington Post reported that, during the Cold War, the resort had been the site of a "bunker", the Emergency Relocation Center known as Project Greek Island, which was intended to house and protect the U.S. Congress in the event of a nuclear attack.

In June 2016, there was a historic severe flood in West Virginia that impacted White Sulphur Springs.

The Greenbrier has also served as a training camp location for the Houston Texans, New Orleans Saints, Cleveland Browns, Arizona Cardinals, New England Patriots, San Francisco 49ers, and New York Giants. During the 2026 FIFA World Cup, the Iraq national football team elected to use the Greenbrier as their base camp for lodging and training prior to and in between matches; the World Cup being held at Meadowlands Sports Complex also forced the Giants to move their training camp to the Greenbrier for 12 days.

== Geography ==
White Sulphur Springs is located along Howard Creek and is served by I-64 and U.S. Route 60.

According to the United States Census Bureau, the city has a total area of 1.98 square miles (5.13 km^{2}), of which 1.95 sq mi (5.05 km^{2}) is land and 0.03 sq mi (0.08 km^{2}) is water. It is also within the National Radio Quiet Zone. Services with AT&T, Verizon, Sprint, and U.S. Cellular are allowed within the area under lower tower frequencies.

=== Climate ===
White Sulphur Springs has a humid continental climate (Koppen Dfa).

Climate data for White Sulphur Springs, West Virginia (1991–2020 normals, extremes 1895–present)
Month	Jan	Feb	Mar	Apr	May	Jun	Jul	Aug	Sep	Oct	Nov	Dec	Year
Record high °F (°C)	77 (25)	79 (26)	88 (31)	96 (36)	96 (36)	99 (37)	102 (39)	100 (38)	103 (39)	93 (34)	82 (28)	77 (25)	103 (39)
Mean daily maximum °F (°C)	40.7 (4.8)	44.7 (7.1)	53.3 (11.8)	65.4 (18.6)	72.7 (22.6)	79.1 (26.2)	82.7 (28.2)	81.9 (27.7)	76.6 (24.8)	66.1 (18.9)	54.6 (12.6)	44.4 (6.9)	63.5 (17.5)
Daily mean °F (°C)	30.8 (−0.7)	33.7 (0.9)	40.9 (4.9)	51.1 (10.6)	59.7 (15.4)	67.2 (19.6)	71.1 (21.7)	70.3 (21.3)	64.2 (17.9)	52.8 (11.6)	41.8 (5.4)	34.4 (1.3)	51.5 (10.8)
Mean daily minimum °F (°C)	20.9 (−6.2)	22.8 (−5.1)	28.4 (−2.0)	36.9 (2.7)	46.7 (8.2)	55.3 (12.9)	59.6 (15.3)	58.7 (14.8)	51.9 (11.1)	39.4 (4.1)	29.1 (−1.6)	24.4 (−4.2)	39.5 (4.2)
Record low °F (°C)	−19 (−28)	−16 (−27)	−8 (−22)	12 (−11)	21 (−6)	30 (−1)	36 (2)	36 (2)	26 (−3)	9 (−13)	−1 (−18)	−34 (−37)	−34 (−37)
Average precipitation inches (mm)	3.05 (77)	2.79 (71)	2.70 (69)	3.66 (93)	4.52 (115)	3.71 (94)	4.15 (105)	3.34 (85)	3.58 (91)	2.70 (69)	2.57 (65)	3.26 (83)	41.03 (1,042)
Average snowfall inches (cm)	5.6 (14)	6.3 (16)	3.4 (8.6)	0.3 (0.76)	0.0 (0.0)	0.0 (0.0)	0.0 (0.0)	0.0 (0.0)	0.0 (0.0)	0.1 (0.25)	0.4 (1.0)	2.0 (5.1)	18.1 (46)
Average precipitation days (≥ 0.01 in)	12.6	11.3	12.4	12.2	14.4	13.4	12.6	12.2	9.8	9.8	9.6	12.1	142.4
Average snowy days (≥ 0.1 in)	3.2	2.9	1.6	0.3	0.0	0.0	0.0	0.0	0.0	0.1	0.4	2.3	10.8
Source: NOAA

== Demographics ==
Historical population
Census	Pop.	Note	%±
1910	338		—
1920	837		147.6%
1930	1,484		77.3%
1940	2,093		41.0%
1950	2,643		26.3%
1960	2,676		1.2%
1970	2,869		7.2%
1980	3,371		17.5%
1990	2,779		−17.6%
2000	2,595		−6.6%
2010	2,444		−5.8%
2020	2,221		−9.1%
2021 (est.)	2,198		−1.0%
U.S. Decennial Census

=== 2020 census ===
As of the 2020 census, White Sulphur Springs had a population of 2,221. The median age was 45.0 years. 18.0% of residents were under the age of 18 and 24.0% of residents were 65 years of age or older. For every 100 females there were 93.8 males, and for every 100 females age 18 and over there were 90.3 males age 18 and over.

0.0% of residents lived in urban areas, while 100.0% lived in rural areas.

There were 1,029 households in White Sulphur Springs, of which 24.4% had children under the age of 18 living in them. Of all households, 31.9% were married-couple households, 24.1% were households with a male householder and no spouse or partner present, and 36.4% were households with a female householder and no spouse or partner present. About 39.8% of all households were made up of individuals and 18.4% had someone living alone who was 65 years of age or older.

There were 1,290 housing units, of which 20.2% were vacant. The homeowner vacancy rate was 2.0% and the rental vacancy rate was 19.0%.

Racial composition as of the 2020 census
Race	Number	Percent
White	1,806	81.3%
Black or African American	249	11.2%
American Indian and Alaska Native	5	0.2%
Asian	22	1.0%
Native Hawaiian and Other Pacific Islander	0	0.0%
Some other race	27	1.2%
Two or more races	112	5.0%
Hispanic or Latino (of any race)	61	2.7%

=== 2010 census ===
At the 2010 census there were 2,444 people, 1,131 households, and 647 families living in the city. The population density was 1,253.3 inhabitants per square mile (483.9/km^{2}). There were 1,414 housing units at an average density of 725.1/sq mi (280.0/km^{2}). The racial makeup of the city was 83.7% White, 13.5% African American, 0.2% Native American, 0.3% Asian, 0.5% from other races, and 1.8% from two or more races. Hispanic or Latino of any race were 1.3%.

Of the 1,131 households, 23.9% had children under the age of 18 living with them, 39.6% were married couples living together, 13.0% had a female householder with no husband present, 4.6% had a male householder with no wife present, and 42.8% were non-families. 37.0% of households were one person and 16.2% were one person aged 65 or older. The average household size was 2.10 and the average family size was 2.72.

The median age was 45.8 years. 17.9% of residents were under the age of 18; 7.8% were between the ages of 18 and 24; 22.9% were from 25 to 44; 28.4% were from 45 to 64; and 22.8% were 65 or older. The gender makeup of the city was 46.1% male and 53.9% female.

=== 2000 census ===
At the 2000 census there were 2,315 people, 1,127 households, and 648 families living in the city. The population density was 1,179.5 people per square mile (456.0/km^{2}). There were 1,354 housing units at an average density of 689.9 per square mile (266.7/km^{2}). The racial makeup of the city was 82.55% White, 14.95% African American, 0.09% Native American, 0.26% Asian, 0.26% from other races, and 1.90% from two or more races. Hispanics or Latinos of any race were 1.04%.

Of the 1,127 households 21.6% had children under the age of 18 living with them, 42.7% were married couples living together, 12.1% had a female householder with no husband present, and 42.5% were non-families. 38.6% of households were one person and 17.7% were one person aged 65 or older. The average household size was 2.05 and the average family size was 2.72.

The age distribution was 19.0% under the age of 18, 7.0% from 18 to 24, 25.8% from 25 to 44, 27.4% from 45 to 64, and 20.8% 65 or older. The median age was 44 years. For every 100 females, there were 82.0 males. For every 100 females age 18 and over, there were 81.4 males.

The median household income was $26,694 and the median family income was $35,450. Males had a median income of $28,566 versus $19,868 for females. The per capita income for the city was $14,822. About 15.7% of families and 17.6% of the population were below the poverty line, including 23.9% of those under age 18 and 8.5% of those age 65 or over.

== Education ==
- White Sulphur Springs Elementary
- Greenbrier Episcopal School

== Transportation ==
Amtrak, the national passenger rail service, provides service to White Sulphur Springs three times a week via the Cardinal route. The station is located at the entrance to The Greenbrier.

The Alleghany Subdivision of the main line of the former Chesapeake and Ohio Railway (now part of CSX) runs through White Sulphur Springs. At one time in its history it was part of the limestone flux cargo route from Hinton, West Virginia to Clifton Forge, Virginia. Its affectionate nickname was "The Gravel Gertie" after the Dick Tracy character.

- I-64
- US 60
- WV 92

== Buildings and structures ==
In 1987 the White Sulphur Springs Library was rebuilt from the old community house. The library is being redeveloped as an educational resource and one of the hearts of the town. The building containing the library was renamed the Katherine Coleman Johnson Building in 2017, after White Sulphur Springs native and NASA scientist Katherine Coleman Johnson.
