= Mount Weather Emergency Operations Center =

Civilian command facility for the Federal Emergency Management Agency

Coordinates: 39.063°N 77.889°W

Mount Weather
- State Route 601, Loudoun–Clarke counties, near Bluemont, Virginia, U.S.
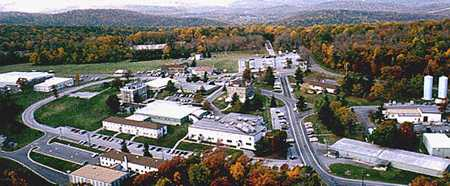
- Mount Weather, with the Shenandoah Valley in the background

Site information
- Type: FEMA command center; permanent Executive Branch substitute
- Controlled by: U.S. Department of Homeland Security
- Status: In service

Location
- Location in the United States Location in Virginia

Site history
- Built: Unknown
- In use: 1959–present

The Mount Weather Emergency Operations Center is a government command facility located near Frogtown, Virginia, used as the center of operations for the Federal Emergency Management Agency (FEMA). Also known as the High Point Special Facility (HPSF), its preferred designation since 1991 is "SF".

The facility is a primary relocation site for the highest level of civilian and military officials in the case of a national disaster, playing a significant role in continuity of government (per the U.S. Continuity of Operations Plan). Mount Weather is the location of a control station for the FEMA National Radio System (FNARS), a high frequency radio system connecting most federal public safety agencies and the U.S. military with most of the states. FNARS allows the president to access the Emergency Alert System.

The site came into the public eye in 1974 by The Washington Post and the Associated Press mentioning the facility after the crash of TWA Flight 514, a Boeing 727 jetliner, into Mount Weather on December 1, 1974, resulting in the death of 92 people.

== Location ==
Located in the Blue Ridge Mountains, access to the operations center is available via State Route 601 (also called Blue Ridge Mountain Road) in Bluemont, Virginia. The facility is located near Purcellville, Virginia, 51 miles (82 km) west of Washington, D.C.

The site was opened as a weather station in the late 1800s. William Jackson Humphreys was selected as the supervising director for the Mount Weather Research Observatory, which was operational from 1904 to 1914. In 1928, the observatory building was the summer White House for President Calvin Coolidge. The site was used as a Civilian Public Service facility (Camp #114) during World War II. At the time, there were just two permanent buildings on the site, the administration/dormitory building and the laboratory. The buildings still stand, supplemented by many modern buildings.

The underground facility within Mount Weather, designated "Area B", was completed in 1959. FEMA established training facilities on the mountain's surface ("Area A") in 1979. The above ground portion of the FEMA complex (Area A) is at least 434 acres (176 ha). The complex includes a training area of unspecified size. Area B, the underground component is 600,000 square feet (56,000 m^{2}).

== Notable activations and evacuations ==
During the northeast blackout of 1965, the Mount Weather Emergency Operations Center had its first full-scale activation. According to a letter to the editor of The Washington Post, after the September 11 attacks, most of the congressional leadership were evacuated to Mount Weather by helicopter.

Between 1979 and 1981, the National Gallery of Art developed a program to transport valuable paintings in its collection to Mount Weather via helicopter. Its success depends on how far in advance warning of an attack is received.

== In the media ==
The first video of Mount Weather shot from the air to be broadcast on national TV was filmed by ABC News producer Bill Lichtenstein. It was included in the 1983 20/20 segment "Nuclear Preparation: Can We Survive", featuring 20/20 correspondent Tom Jarriel. Lichtenstein and an ABC camera crew flew over the Mount Weather facility. The news magazine report also included House majority leader Tip O'Neill and Representative Ed Markey, confirming that there were contingency plans for the relocation of the United States government in the event of a nuclear war or major disaster.

Mount Weather and the later deactivated bunker at The Greenbrier were featured in the A&E documentary Bunkers which was first broadcast on October 23, 2001. It features interviews with political and intelligence analysts, engineers comparing The Greenbrier and Mount Weather to the control bunker Saddam Hussein had which was buried beneath Baghdad, Iraq. Mount Weather was a location in The CW series The 100. Mount Weather is mentioned in the 1963 film Seven Days in May as the location from where a coup will be launched.

== See also ==
- Presidential Emergency Operations Center
- Cheyenne Mountain Complex
- Military Auxiliary Radio System
- Raven Rock Mountain Complex
- Warrenton Training Center
