= Timeline of women's sports =

This is a timeline of women's sports, spanning from ancient history up to the 21st century. It includes both competitive sports and notable physical feats.

== Early history ==
2134–2000 BCE – Illustrations on Egyptian temple walls from the Eleventh Dynasty showed women exercising and playing ball games.

6th century BCE – The Heraean Games were the first recorded women's athletic competition, held in the stadium at Olympia.

396 BCE – Cynisca became the first woman to win at the Olympic Games; she employed male charioteers to drive the horses she trained and entered her team at the Olympics, where it won in the four-horse chariot race (tethrippon Greek: τέθριππον).

368 BCE – Spartan charioteer Euryleonis won the two-horse chariot races in that year's Olympic games. A bronze statue was erected in Sparta in her honour.

2nd century CE – Contemporary writers and historians described female gladiators fighting in Rome.

25–220 – Han Dynasty-era frescoes depict women playing the ancient game of Tsu Chu. There are a number of opinions about the dates of the frescoes with the earliest estimates around 5000 BCE.

1296 – At a Christmas feast for Edward I of England, an acrobat named either Maud or Matilda Makejoy performed acrobatic feats as part of the entertainment.

Pre-Columbian era – In the Americas, women from many indigenous tribes participated in sports such as foot races, swimming, stick and ball games, and wrestling contests. Starting in the 16th century, however, European settlers and colonial influence gradually began limiting athletic opportunities for indigenous women, particularly as Europeans tried to forcibly assimilate indigenous people into Western culture.

1493 – When Italian noblewoman Beatrice d'Este visited Venice, a regatta was held in which fifty peasant women competed.

1567 – Mary, Queen of Scots became the first recorded woman to play golf in Scotland at Musselburgh Links.

== 18th century ==
1722 – English champion boxer Elizabeth Wilkinson won her first public bout, after challenging a local woman to a fight.

1745 – The first recorded women's cricket match took place in Surrey, England. By the second half of the eighteenth century, women's cricket matches played between local teams became common in the South East of England.

1768 – A French woman named Madame Bunel played a highly publicized tennis match against the English Mr. Tomkins. After three sets, she defeated him 2–1, subsequently winning again in a rematch 11 days later.

1780 – At the American horse racing track of Hempstead Plains, Long Island, a three-day equestrian event included a competition for women riders.

1781 – As archery became a popular sport for the aristocracy in England, upper-class women and men competed in archery contests and created archery societies such as the Toxophilite Society.

1784 – Élisabeth Thible of France was the first woman to fly in a hot-air balloon.

1790s – An annual women's association football competition was held in Mid-Lothian, Scotland.

== 19th century ==
1811 – The first women's golf tournament is held at the Royal Musselburgh Golf Club, Scotland.

1816 – French tightrope walker Madame Saqui performed in England to celebrate the opening of Vauxhall Bridge. After ascending a 300-ft inclined rope to the top of a tower, she completed one of her signature tricks, running back down along the rope while fireworks exploded in the background.

1819 – In a New York City exhibition, a Mrs. Adolphe became the first woman to publicly walk on a tightrope.

1825 – Madame Johnson ascended from New York in a hot air balloon in New York, later landing in a swamp in the neighboring state of New Jersey.

1842 – English rower Ann Glanville achieved national celebrity becoming known as the champion female rower of the world; her all-women crew often winning against the best male teams.

1856 – The Swedish swimmer and bath house director Nancy Edberg arranged her first public Swimming exhibitions with female swimmers.

1858 – On August 5, the American Julia Archibald Holmes became the first woman to climb to the summit of Pike's Peak in Colorado.

1863 – Association football governing bodies introduced standardized rules to prohibit violence on the pitch, making it more socially acceptable for women to play.

1864 – A group of 25 founding members form the Park Place Croquet Club of Brooklyn. Croquet is believed to be the first game played by both sexes in the United States.

1866 – Two baseball teams with female players were formed at Vassar College in New York.

1867 – The first ladies golf club was formed at St. Andrew's in Scotland. It gained 500 members by 1886.

1867 – The Dolly Vardens from Philadelphia, Pennsylvania, an all African-American baseball team, became the first women's professional sports team.

1870 – An image of a women's double scull race made the cover of Harper's Weekly in 1870.

1874 – Tennis was introduced to the United States by Mary Ewing Outerbridge of Staten Island. She brought the needed equipment to the United States from Bermuda and set up the first American court at Staten Island Cricket and Baseball Club.

1875 – The first game of baseball played by women in front of a paying audience took place in Springfield, Illinois on September 11.

1875 – Wellesley College, an all women institution, opened a gymnasium for students to exercise and sponsored the first women's rowing program in the U.S. They also opened up a lake for ice skating.

1876 – In the first women's boxing match held in the United States, Nell Saunders defeated Rose Harland. Her prize was a silver butter dish.

1882 – The YWCA of Boston sponsored the first ever athletic games for women.

1884 – Maud Watson, of England, won the first Ladies' Singles title at Wimbledon.

1887 – Ellen Hansell, an American, became the first women's singles tennis champion. She won the title at the U.S. Open.

1888 – Cyclists competed in the world's first women's bicycle race in New South Wales, Australia. The competitors raced on a course that was two miles (3.2 kilometers) long.

1889 – Bertha Townsend and Margarette Ballard, both of the United States, won the first women's doubles at the U.S. Open.

1890s – Cricket was taught as a sport in several girls' public schools in England including the Roedean School, Wycombe Abbey, the Royal School, and Clifton Ladies.

1890 – Nellie Bly, a reporter for the New York World newspaper, became the first woman to travel around the world alone. She completed the journey on January 25 after 72 days of travel.

1892 – The first women's football match recorded by the Scottish Football Association took place in Glasgow, Scotland.

1892 – Four young women started what became ZLAC Rowing Club in San Diego, California, which is thought today to be the world's oldest continuously existing all-women's rowing club.

1892 - First inter-institutional women's basketball game, between the University of California, Berkeley and Miss Head's School.

1893 – Newnham College Boat Club was formed in Cambridge, England.

1893 – The Ladies' Golf Union, the governing body for women's and girls' amateur golf in Great Britain and Ireland, was founded in St Andrews, Scotland and the first British Ladies Amateur Golf Championship was won by Lady Margaret Scott at Royal Lytham & St Annes Golf Club.

1894 – The most well-documented early European association football women's team was founded by activist Nettie Honeyball in England and named the British Ladies' Football Club.

1894 – The first golf tournament for women in the United States was won by Hollard A. Ford. Held on a 7-hole course in Morristown, New Jersey, Ford easily won with a score of 97 on the double-7. She was 14 strokes under the 2nd place golfer.

1894 - Dribbling and guarding another player was prohibited in women's basketball.

1895 – In England, the first recorded game of association football between women took place.

1895 – The women's University Match in (field) hockey between the University of Oxford and the University of Cambridge was first played in 1895, making it the oldest women's varsity match in the world.

1895 – The American Annie Smith Peck climbed the Matterhorn, becoming the first woman to reach the summit.

1895 – At the Meadow Brook Club in Hempstead, New York, 13 women competed in the first women's amateur golf championship in the United States. Mrs. Charles S. Brown won the tournament with a score of 132 and Nellie Sargent came in second place.

1895 – A group of "nimble, supple and vivacious girls" competed in what is considered the first organized athletics meeting for women in the United States. Hosted by Vassar College and known as a "Field Day," there were running and jumping events.

1895 – Chicago's West Division High School formed the first women's softball team, but they went without a coach for four years until 1899.

1895 - Clara Gregory Baer wrote the first book of rules for women's basketball.

1895 - The first public women's basketball game in the South was played at a men's only club, the Southern Athletic Club.

1896 – A six-day bicycle race for women, the first of its kind, began at New York City's Madison Square Garden on January 6.

1896 – Stanford University and the University of California at Berkeley faced off on April 4 in the first women's intercollegiate basketball championship before a crowd of 700 women. Stanford won, 2–1.

1896 – Stamata Revithi, of Greece, ran the 40-kilometer marathon during the 1896 Summer Olympics in Athens, Greece.

1897 – Adine Masson, of France, became the first winner of the ladies singles at the French Open.

1897 - The first recorded women's basketball game in Australia was held, played in Victoria, using wet paper bags for baskets.

1897 - The first women's high school basketball game was held, between Austin High and Oak Park. It was won by Austin 16–4.

1898 - On July 5, 1898, Lizzie Arlington became the first woman to play for a professional men's baseball team when she pitched the ninth inning for the Reading Coal Heavers against the Allentown Peanuts.

1899 - Senda Berenson published the first issue of Basketball Guide for Women, which she would edit and update for eighteen years. These rules, with minor modifications, would remain in use until the 1960s.

== 20th century ==
=== 1900s ===
Early 1900s - In the early 1900s Edith Garrud became the first British female teacher of jujutsu, and one of the first female martial arts instructors in the Western world.

1900 – The 1900 Summer Olympics in Paris introduces women's events, offering golf, tennis, and croquet. Hélène de Pourtalès of Switzerland was the first woman to win a gold medal as part of a mixed sailing crew. Charlotte Cooper of Great Britain becomes the first individual female winner in an Olympic event. American Margaret Abbott won a gold medal in golf.

1901 – The game of field hockey was introduced to the United States by Constance M.K. at Harvard University.

1904 – The first public match of the women's sport camogie was played in Meath, Ireland. Camogie was developed as a women's variation of the men's sport hurling, with similar rules and equipment.

1904 - Women's boxing first appeared in the Olympic Games as a demonstration sport in 1904, in St. Louis.

1905 – The Camogie Association is founded in Dublin, Ireland to organise and promote the women's sport of camogie in Ireland and across the world.

1905 – Women from Britain and America first play an international golf match, with the British winning 6 matches to 1.

1907 – Adine Masson and Yvonne de Pfoeffel, both of France, won the first women's doubles at the French Open.

1909 – Alice Huyler Ramsey became the first woman to drive across the United States, her home country.

=== 1910s ===
1911 – Having inherited the St. Louis Cardinals from her father in 1911, Helene Britton became the first woman to own a major league baseball team.

1912 – Fanny Durack, from Australia, became the first female Olympic swimming champion at the 1912 Summer Olympics in Stockholm, Sweden, when she won the women's 100 m freestyle event. Compatriot, Mina Wylie finished second, becoming the first female swimming silver medallist. This was also the first olympics to include women's diving.

1913 – Winifred McNair and Dora Boothby, both of Great Britain, won the first Wimbledon Championships ladies' doubles tournament.

1913 - A single dribble became permitted in women's basketball as long as it bounces knee-high.

1914 – The rules for women's basketball in the United States were altered to permit half-court play.

1916 - Coaching from the sidelines was prohibited during women's basketball, except for halftime.

1917 – Women's association football became popular on a large scale in the United Kingdom during the First World War, when employment in heavy industry spurred the growth of the game, much as it had done for men fifty years earlier. A team from England played a team from Ireland on Boxing Day 1917 in front of a crowd of 20,000 spectators. The following year, a knock-out competition called the Munitionettes Cup was held which attracted 30 teams. The final was played in front of a crowd of 22,000.

1918 – Marie-Louise Ledru, a French athlete, has been credited as the first woman to race the now-defined marathon distance of 42.195 km. On September 29, 1918, Ledru reportedly completed the Tour de Paris Marathon in a time of 5 hours and 40 minutes and finished in 38th place. The International Association of Athletics Federations, the international governing body for the sport of athletics, however, recognizes Violet Piercy from England as having set the first women's world best in the marathon on October 3, 1926, with a time of 3:40:22.

1918 - The bottom of the basket was removed in women's basketball.

1918 - Substitutes were allowed for the first time in women's basketball (but could not re-enter the game).

1918 - The bounce pass became allowed in women's basketball.

1919 – Afghanistan became independent from British control and began working to "modernize the country" by introducing new sports and physical fitness opportunities for girls and women. Basketball and volleyball teams were created in all girls' high schools.

=== 1920s ===
1920 – Dick, Kerr's Ladies association football team played in the first women's international matches in 1920, against a team from Paris, France, and also made up most of the England team against a Scottish Ladies XI in the same year, winning 22–0.

1920 – The All-Philadelphia team, the first American women's field hockey team, was denied entry to the 1920 Summer Olympics in Antwerp, Belgium. They played, however, in an English tournament but did not win either game.

1921 – The 1921 Women's Olympiad, held in Monaco, was the first international women's sports event.

1921 – Following the Football Association ban on women's teams on 5 December, the English Ladies' Football Association was formed. A total of 24 teams entered the first competition in the spring of 1922.

1922 – Field hockey had grown enough in the United States that a national governing body, the U.S. Field Hockey Association, was established.

1922 – The 1922 Women's World Games, held in Paris, included the first regular track and field competitions for women.

1922 – The 1922 Women's Olympiad was held in Monaco.

1922 – Margaret Molesworth, of Australia, won the first Ladies Singles at the Australian Open. Esna Boyd Robertson and Marjorie Mountain, both of Australia, won the first women's doubles.

1922 - Lizzie Murphy in 1922 become the first female baseball player to play against major league players, in a game that was a charity exhibition pitting all-star players from the New England and American Leagues against the Boston Red Sox.

1923 – The 1923 Women's Olympiad was held in Monaco.

1923 – The First British track and field Championships Championships were held, followed shortly thereafter by the first American track and field Championships.

1924 – The 1924 Women's Olympiad was held at Stamford Bridge, London.

1926 – The Amateur Athletic Union sponsored the first-ever American national women's basketball championship.

1926 – Gertrude Ederle swam the English Channel. The first woman to do so, she completed the swim in fourteen hours, thirty-one minutes, setting a new record.

1926 – Violet Piercy, an English long-distance runner, was recognized by the International Association of Athletics Federations as having set the first women's world best in the marathon on 3 October with a time of 3:40:22. (Note: The marathon world record progression of the Association of Road Running Statisticians includes Piercy, however, it notes Marie-Louise Ledru of France as the first woman. According to the ARRS, Ledru ran 5:40:xx at the Tour de Paris Marathon held on 29 September 1918.) Piercy was reported to have run unofficially, and her mark was set on the Polytechnic Marathon course between Windsor and London. (Note: A number of sources, including Kathrine Switzer, have reported that the venue for Piercy's mark was the actual Polytechnic Marathon; however, records from the Association of Road Racing Statisticians confirm that the 1926 Polytechnic Marathon was held on 18 May. The course for the Polytechnic Marathon did vary over the years and there is currently very little information available to state exactly which route was run by Piercy. Although the IAAF progression notes the location for her performance as "Chiswick", the Polytechnic Marathon did not end in Chiswick until 1938. Prior to 1933, the Polytechnic Marathon ended at Stamford Bridge in West London. An ESPN reference does note Stamford Bridge as the location where Piercy's run finished.)

1926 – The 1926 Women's World Games were held in Gothenburg, Sweden.

1926 - The first evidence of women playing organized football was in 1926. It was then that an NFL team called the Frankford Yellow Jackets (the predecessors to the modern Philadelphia Eagles) employed a women's team for halftime entertainment.

1926 - In Japan, women's sumo was banned by the government in 1926.

1926 - Women have trained in the Kodokan Judo Institute since 1926, but originally always separately from men. In 1962, after "pulverizing" the other students in the women's training group, Rena Kanokogi became the first woman allowed to train in the men's group at the Kodokan.

1927 – The first Women's Boat Race between the University of Oxford and the University of Cambridge was held on The Isis in Oxford, England.

1927 – Women's Eights Head of the River Races began in London, England, one year after the first men's race.

1927 - Players became required to wear a number on the back in women's basketball.

1928 – Women competed in track and field events in the Olympic games for the first time at the 1928 Summer Olympics in Amsterdam, Netherlands.

=== 1930s ===
1930 – Frenchwomen Marguerite Mareuse and Odette Siko became the first women to race at the 24 Hours of Le Mans, finishing 7th overall.

1930 – The 1930 Women's World Games were held in Prague, Czechoslovakia.

1930 - The first international women's handball game was played in 1930 (between Germany and Austria).

1931 – Women were banned from playing professional baseball by Judge Kenesaw Mountain Landis. Landis was upset that a girl, 17-year-old Jackie Mitchell, had struck out both Babe Ruth and Lou Gehrig during exhibition play.

1932 – The first All-Ireland Senior Camogie Championship was won by Dublin.

1932 – Brazilian swimmer Maria Lenk became the first South American woman to participate in the Olympic Games, competing in events for breaststroke, freestyle, and backstroke. She went on to break two world records in breaststroke events.

1932 – Odette Siko became the first woman to achieve a class win at the 24 Hours of Le Mans.

1932 – The Associated Press named American Babe Didrikson as the Woman Athlete of the Year for track and field. Didrickson had earlier driven her team to the Amateur Athletic Union national meet championship. She scored thirty points by herself at the meet. The whole second place team collectively only scored 22.

1932 - Guarding another player was first allowed in women's basketball.

1934 – The inaugural international Women's Test cricket match took place between the England national women's cricket team and the Australia national women's cricket team in December. The following year, the New Zealand national women's cricket team played them.

1934 – The 1934 Women's World Games were held in London, in the United Kingdom.

1935 - The first girl to play on a boys varsity high school baseball team was Nellie Twardzik, on April 24, 1935,

1936 – The first professional basketball team for women, the All American Red Heads Team, was formed. It was a barnstorming troupe.

1936 – The first American to win a world singles table tennis championship was a woman, Ruth Hughes Aarons.

1936 - For the first time in women's basketball a guard, called a "rover", was allowed to play the entire court.

1937 – Grace Hudowalski was the ninth person and first woman to climb all 46 of the Adirondack High Peaks.

1937 – The first association football "Championship of Great Britain and the World" was played between Dick, Kerr's Ladies F.C. and Edinburgh City Girls.

1938 – Canadian sprinter Barbara Howard competed at the 1938 British Empire Games, becoming the first Black woman to represent Canada in international athletic competition.

1938 - The women's basketball court was divided into two sections, rather than three. Team size remained six players each.

1938 - In 1938, Helene Mayer won the Fencing Association's San Francisco Division men's title; two days later she was stripped of the title, as the Association adopted a rule banning competition between women and men, stating that since fencing involved physical contact, "a chivalrous man found it difficult to do his worst when he faced a woman." The restriction was later lifted in the 1950s.

1939 - American women fencers were originally required to wear skirts when competing. In 1937, the Amateur Fencers League of America issued a new rule book stating, among other things, that after September 1, 1939, women would be allowed to wear either a "divided skirt" or "loose-fitting white trousers fastened below the knee".

1939 – Anna Lee Aldred received her professional license from the Agua Caliente Racetrack in Baja California, Mexico, thus becoming the first U.S. woman to receive a jockey's license.

=== 1940s ===
1940 - The Amateur Fencers League of America issued a new rule book stating, among other things, that women were allowed to compete in foil (in bouts to four points or eight minutes), but touches below the waist (delineated by a dark-colored sash) were off-target.

1941 – It was illegal for women to play soccer in Brazil from 1941 to 1979.

1943 – Chicago White Sox owner Philip Wrigley founded the All-American Girls Softball League, the precursor to the All-American Girls Professional Baseball League.

1945 - Babe Zaharias became the first woman to make the tournament cut in a regular PGA Tour event.

1946 - Edith Houghton became the first woman to work as an independent scout in Major League Baseball when she was hired by the Philadelphia Phillies of the National League.

1947 - Abbye "Pudgy" Stockton helped organize the first Amateur Athletic Union-sanctioned weightlifting competition for women, which was held in 1947.

1947 - Players became required to wear a number on the front and the back in women's basketball.

1947 - Women were banned from boxing in Mexico City.

1949 – Marcenia Lyle Alberga was the first woman to play a full season of professional baseball.

1949 – Sara Christian became the first female NASCAR driver, racing in the inaugural race at Charlotte Speedway, even though she had Bob Flock finish the race. In the second official race at Daytona Beach and Road Course, also in 1949, Christian was joined by Ethel Mobley and Louise Smith, with Mobley finishing ahead of the 3, at 11th.

1949 – The inaugural women's Volleyball World Championship was held in the Soviet Union, three years after the inaugural men's event. It became the oldest and most important of all the international volleyball events organised by the FIVB.

1949 - Hazel Walker became the first woman to own a professional basketball team, the Arkansas Travelers.

1949 - Players were now allowed a two-bounce dribble in women's basketball.

=== 1950s ===
1950s - In 1938, Helene Mayer won the Fencing Association's San Francisco Division men's title; two days later she was stripped of the title, as the Association adopted a rule banning competition between women and men, stating that since fencing involved physical contact, "a chivalrous man found it difficult to do his worst when he faced a woman." The restriction was later lifted in the 1950s.

1950 – There not being a rule against it, 12-year-old Kathryn Johnston of Corning, New York became the first girl to play Little League Baseball. Johnson played first base for the King's Dairy team. After that, a rule prohibited girls from playing in Little League; this was in force until 1974.

1950 - The LPGA was founded in 1950. Its thirteen founders were: Alice Bauer, Patty Berg, Bettye Danoff, Helen Dettweiler, Marlene Hagge, Helen Hicks, Opal Hill, Betty Jameson, Sally Sessions, Marilynn Smith, Shirley Spork, Louise Suggs, and Babe Zaharias.

1951 – Betty Chapman, an African-American, broke the color barrier by becoming the first of her race to play professional softball.

1951 - Coaching from the sidelines during time outs became permitted in women's basketball.

1952 – Patricia McCormick began bullfighting as a professional Matadora in January 1952, and was the first American to do so.

1952 – Major League Baseball created a ban on the signing of women to contracts.

1953 – The first international women's basketball championship was held, including teams (in order of final standing) from the US, Chile, France, Brazil, Paraguay, Argentina, Peru, Mexico, Switzerland, Paraguay and Cuba.

1953 – Toni Stone, also known by her married name Marcenia Lyle Alberga, was the first of three women to play Negro league baseball, and thus the first woman to play as a regular on an American big-league professional baseball team.

1954 – The first international women's rowing races were introduced at the European Rowing Championships.

1954 – The All-American Girls Professional Baseball League played its final game and folded.

1954 - Diane Leather of England became the first woman to run a sub-5-minute mile.

1954 - Barbara Buttrick was part of the first boxing match between two women on American national television.

1955 – The Ladies Professional Golf Association held their first championship.

1955 - The three second rule was implemented in women's basketball - players in the offensive lane may not hold the ball for more than three seconds.

1957 - The Amateur Fencers League of America issued a new rule book including, among other things, alternate rules for 8-point bouts (women's foil) and 10-point bouts (men at all weapons), with a requirement of a two-point advantage (15-minute time limit).

1958 – An Italian, Maria Teresa de Filippis, became the first woman to drive in a European Grand Prix.

1959 – Arlene Pieper became the first woman to officially finish a marathon in the United States when she finished the Pikes Peak Marathon.

=== 1960s ===
1962 - The first women officials appeared in an AAU basketball national tournament—Fran Koening and Carol Walter.

1962 - Beryl Swain became the first woman to compete in a TT race for solo motorcycles on the Isle of Man TT course. There was subsequently a ban on women in that race from later in 1962 until Hilary Musson competed in 1978.

1962 - Two "rovers" (players permitted to run the entire court) became allowed in women's basketball.

1926 - Women have trained in the Kodokan Judo Institute since 1926, but originally always separately from men. In 1962, after "pulverizing" the other students in the women's training group, Rena Kanokogi became the first woman allowed to train in the men's group at the Kodokan.

1965 – Australia beat the United States in the final game of the first international women's softball tournament, 1–0. The tournament was held in Melbourne, Australia.

1965 - The Amateur Fencers League of America issued a new rule book in which, among other things, the target area for women's foil was made the same as that for men's foil.

1966 – The first basketball tournament for women's collegiate teams was held in Pennsylvania.

1966 - Continuous dribble became allowed in women's basketball.

1966 – The American Roberta Louise "Bobbi" Gibb was the first woman to run the entire Boston Marathon.

1967 – The American Kathrine Switzer was the first woman to run the Boston Marathon as a numbered entry.

1967 – Nancy Greene, a Canadian, became the first woman's season champion in the World Cup of ski racing.

1967 - Anne Smith of Great Britain broke two world records in one race; these times of 4:17.3 (1500m) and 4:37.0 (mile) were the first female world records in those distances to be officially ratified by the IAAF.

1968 - In 1967 Kathryn Kusner applied for a jockey license through the Maryland Racing Commission but was denied because she was a woman. However, in 1968 Judge Ernest A. Loveless of the Circuit Court of Prince George's County ordered her to be granted the license. Kusner thus became the first licensed female jockey in the United States in 1968.

1968 - The Italy women's national football team (Italian: Nazionale di calcio femminile dell'Italia) has represented Italy in international women's football since their inception in 1968.

1968 - Coaching from the sidelines during women's basketball games became permitted.

1969 – Barbara Jo Rubin became the first female jockey to win a race in the United States.

1969 – The English Women's Football Association was formed.

1969 - Carol Eckman formed the first National Invitational Women's Intercollegiate Basketball Tournament.

=== 1970s ===
1970s – Italy became the first country with professional women's association football players on a part-time basis.

1970 - The American Diane Crump became the first female jockey to ride in the Kentucky Derby.

1971 – The Football Association's ban on women's matches being played on members' grounds was lifted. In the same year, UEFA recommended that the women's game should be taken under the control of the national associations in each country.

1971 – Cheryl White, an American, became the first black female jockey.

1971 – The rules of women's basketball in the United States were changed to have five players per team using a full court. A thirty-second shot clock was also implemented.

1971 – The Amateur Athletic Union ruled that "certain women" could take part in marathons, provided they either started their race 10 minutes before or after the men or on a different starting line. The different starting line requirement and ten minutes' difference requirement were dropped in 1972.

1971 - The Association for Intercollegiate Athletics for Women (AIAW) formed to govern collegiate women's athletics in the United States and to administer national championships. The transition to the AIAW covered a ten-month period starting in April 1971.

1971 - The New York City Board of Education voted to allow boys to compete with girls in non-contact sports.

1971 - Phyllis Graber joined the Jamaica High School tennis team in 1971, becoming the first officially sanctioned female member of a formerly all-male high school varsity tennis team in New York City.

1972 - Following a letter campaign against the rule prohibiting women from being promoted to higher than 5th dan, Keiko Fukuda and her senpai Masako Noritomi (1913–1982) became the first women promoted to 6th dan by the Kodokan Judo Institute.

1972 - Following an UEFA recommendation in 1972 for national associations to incorporate the women's game, the Football Association (FA) later that year rescinded its ban on women playing on English Football League grounds.

1972 – Title IX of the Educational Amendment of 1972 was signed by President Richard Nixon, prohibiting sex-based discrimination in any school or other education program that receives federal money.

1972 - Nina Kuscsik, Pat Barrett, Lynn Blackstone, Liz Franceschini, Cathy Miller, and Jane Muhrke protested the rule of the Amateur Athletic Union that women marathoners had to start their race ten minutes before or after the men, which as implemented by the New York City Marathon that year meant that women had to start running ten minutes before the men. The women protested by sitting down and waiting ten minutes while holding signs protesting the rule, before starting to run when the men started; they became known as the NYC Six due to their protest. Ten minutes were added to their times. The ten minutes' difference requirement was dropped later in 1972.

1972 – The American Nina Kuscsik became the first woman to officially win the Boston Marathon.

1972 - The New York State Court of Appeals ruled that Bernice Gera could be a baseball umpire. As such, on June 24, 1972, she became the first female umpire in professional baseball; however, she quit after one game.

1972 - Jockey Club rules began permitting women jockeys in 1972.

1973 – Billie Jean King won the "Battle of the Sexes" tennis match against Bobby Riggs in America.

1973 – The US Open was the first Grand Slam tournament to offer equal prize money to women and men.

1973 – Terry Williams Munz became the first woman in America awarded an athletic scholarship when she accepted a golf scholarship from the University of Miami.

1973 - On April 18, 1973, the United States Court of Appeals for the Eighth Circuit ruled that girls could not be banned from high school sports teams for non-contact sports.

1973 - The Women's Tennis Association (WTA), the principal organizing body of women's professional tennis, was founded in June 1973 by Billie Jean King, though it traces its origins to the inaugural Virginia Slims tournament, arranged by Gladys Heldman, sponsored by Joe Cullman, CEO of Philip Morris, and held on 23 September 1970 at the Houston Racquet Club in Houston, Texas. Rosie Casals won this first event.

1973 - The first (partial) scholarships for basketball were offered to female students.

1974 – Angela Hernandez (also known as Angela Hernandez Gomez and just Angela), of Spain, won a case in the Spanish Supreme Court allowing women to be bullfighters in Spain; a prohibition against women doing so was put in place in Spain in 1908.

1974 – The Women's Sports Foundation was created by Billie Jean King in America. It is "a charitable educational organization dedicated to increasing the participation of girls and women in sports and fitness and creating an educated public that supports gender equity in sport."

1974 – Seven teams joined to form the Women's Professional Football League.

1974 – The Portland Mavericks hired Lanny Moss to manage the team. She was the first woman to serve as skipper for a professional men's baseball team.

1974 – Girls were formally permitted to play in the Little League Baseball program as result of a lawsuit brought on behalf of Frances Pescatore and Jenny Fulle.

1974 - Ann Meyers became the first woman signed to a four-year college athletic scholarship; it was for basketball at UCLA.

1975 – Junko Tabei of Japan became the first woman to reach the summit of Mount Everest.

1975 - Caroline Svendsen became the first woman to receive a boxing license in the United States when she was granted one in Nevada.

1975 - The first nationally televised women's basketball game was played by Maryland and Immaculata.

1975 - The first Kodak All-American team in women's basketball was named.

1976 – Krystyna Choynowski-Liskiewicz, a native of Poland, sailed around the world by herself. When she finished on March 28 she was the first woman to do so.

1976 – The Connecticut Falcons won the first Women's Professional Softball World Series Championship.

1976 – Nadia Comăneci, at the time a 15-year-old Romanian gymnast, won three Olympic gold medals at the 1976 Summer Olympics in Montreal, Canada, and was the first gymnast to be awarded a perfect score of 10 in an Olympic gymnastic event.

1976 - At the 1976 Summer Olympics, a woman won an Olympic medal in shooting for the first time: Margaret Murdock received silver in the three positions event while competing against men.

1976 – Women's rowing was added to the Olympic Games program at a distance of 1000 metres.

1976 - Women's handball was added at the 1976 Summer Olympics.

1976 - Women's basketball was added to the Olympics.

1976 - Pat Pineda became the first female boxer to be licensed in California.

1977 – The American Janet Guthrie was the first woman to compete in the Indianapolis 500 and the Daytona 500, and the first woman to lead a NASCAR Winston Cup Series event.

1977 – The American Shirley Muldowney was the first woman to win a (in the first of three) NHRA Winston Drag Racing Series, in the Top Fuel category.

1977 - Parade Magazine named its first high school All-American team for girls' basketball. The first team includes future Women's Basketball Hall of Fame members Denise Curry, Cindy Noble and Lynette Woodard.

1977 - The first Broderick Cup was awarded to "the best athlete in each sport". The first recipient was Lusia Harris.

1977 - Women were not allowed to be members of the Professional Golfers' Association of America (PGA) until 1977.

1977 - Cathy Davis sued the New York State Athletic Commission (NYSAC) in 1977 because she was denied a boxing license because she was a woman, and the case was decided in her favor later that year, with the judge invalidating New York State rule number 205.15, which stated, “No woman may be licensed as a boxer or second or licensed to compete in any wrestling exhibition with men.” In his opinion the judge cited the precedent set by Garrett v. New York State Athletic Commission (1975), which “found the regulation invalid under the equal protection clauses of the State and Federal Constitutions”. The NYSAC filed an appeal of the ruling, but later dropped it.

1978 - Cathy Davis, on September 19, 1978, received the NYSAC's first boxing license given to a female boxer.

1978 - After Beryl Swain became the first woman to compete in a TT race for solo motorcycles on the Isle of Man TT course in 1962, there was subsequently a ban on women in that race from later in 1962 until Hilary Musson competed in 1978.

1978 - The Women's Professional Basketball League formed, the first professional women's basketball league in the United States. It lasted until 1981.

1978 - The first Wade Trophy was awarded to the best women's basketball player in National Collegiate Athletic Association (NCAA) Division I competition. The first recipient was Carol Blazejowski.

1979 – United States Women's National Team took home the top prize, a gold medal, at the Pan-American Games.

1979 – Crystal Fields, who competed against all boys in the finals, became the first girl to win a baseball Pitch, Hit, and Run competition.

1979 – It was illegal for women to play soccer in Brazil from 1941 to 1979.

1979 – American Lyn Lemaire was the first woman to compete in an Ironman Triathlon. She placed sixth overall.

1979 - A lawsuit made California change its boxing regulations, which had limited women boxers to no more than four rounds.

1979 - Norwegian Grete Waitz became the first woman in history to run a marathon in under two and a half hours, which she did at the New York City Marathon.

=== 1980s ===
1980 – American Mary Decker became the first woman to run a sub-4:30 mile.

1981 – French rally driver Michèle Mouton became the first female driver to win overall at world championship event in rallying when she won the Rallye Sanremo.

1982 – Kathy Rude became the first woman to win a professional road race in the United States when she won her class at the 24 Hours of Daytona and later became the first woman to set a lap record at Charlotte Motor Speedway.

1982 – The National Collegiate Athletic Association began sponsoring women's basketball.

1982 – Louisiana Tech (35–1) won the first NCAA Division I women's basketball tournament.

1982 – Cal Poly Pomona (29–7) won the first NCAA Women's Division II Basketball Championship.

1982 – Elizabethtown (26–1) won the first NCAA Women's Division III Basketball Championship.

1982 – The Springnationals round of NHRA Winston Drag Racing Series was marked by the first ever female vs. female final, between Shirley Muldowney and Lucille Lee.

1984 – The U.S. Women's softball team beat China, 1–0, to win the first Women's International Cup championship.

1984 – The first Olympic marathon for women was held in Los Angeles. American Joan Benoit won.

1984 - West Virginia's Georgeann Wells became the first woman to register a dunk in an official NCAA intercollegiate basketball game.

1984 - The ball circumference for women's basketball NCAA play is reduced by one inch (to 28.5–29 inches) compared to the ball used previously, and used by men. This size ball is also called size 6.

1984 - Margaret Swan Forbes published Coaching Synchronized Swimming Effectively; it was the first official teaching manual for synchronized swimming.

1985 – The distance for Women's rowing in the Olympic Games programme was extended to 2000 metres, the distance raced at the 1988 Summer Olympics in Seoul, South Korea, and thereafter, consistent with men's rowing events at the Olympics.

1985 – A year after finishing 2nd (and winning her class) Michèle Mouton became the first woman to win overall at the Pikes Peak International Hill Climb.

1985 – The American Karyn Marshall became the first woman in history to clean and jerk over 300 lb (136 kg), with a 303 lb (137.5 kg) clean and jerk.

1985 – The American Libby Riddles became the first woman to win the Iditarod (Mary Shields was the first woman to complete the race in 1974, finishing 23rd).

1985 – The United States national soccer team was formed.

1986 – The American Ann Bancroft was the first woman to reach the North Pole by foot and dogsled, and "...she became the first known woman to cross the ice to the North Pole."

1986 - Texas (34–0) won the NCAA Division I women's basketball tournament, completing the first undefeated season in women's NCAA Division I history.

1986 - The alternating possession arrow was first used in women's basketball, although a jump ball was still used at the beginning of the game, and the beginning of overtime. Coaches must stay within the coaching box, and only the head coach may stand while the ball is live.

1986 - New South Wales banned women's boxing from 1986 to 2009.

1987 – Tania Aebi completed a circumnavigation of the globe in a 26-foot sailboat between the ages of 18 and 21, making her the first American woman to sail around the world. Her record was not recognized by Guinness World Records, however, because she sailed through the Panama Canal, which required assistance. She also sailed eighty miles with a friend in the South Pacific.

1987 – The first women's world championship in weightlifting was held; it was held in Daytona Beach, Florida and won by the American Karyn Marshall.

1987 – The [American] National Girls and Women in Sports Day (NGWSD) is an annual day of observance held during the first week of February to acknowledge the accomplishments of female athletes, recognize the influence of sports participation for women and girls, and honor the progress and continuing struggle for equality for women in sports.

1987 - The three-point field goal was introduced in women's basketball for any field goal completed when shot beyond a line set at 19 feet, and 9 inches from the center of the basket.

1988 – The first Henley Women's Regatta took place at Henley-on-Thames in England.

1988 - Pam Postema became the first woman to umpire a Major League Baseball spring training game.

1988 – The American Shawna Robinson was the first woman to win a NASCAR-sanctioned stock car race, winning in the Charlotte/Daytona Dash Series at New Asheville Speedway.

1989 – Japan became the first country to have a semi-professional women's football league, the L. League, which is still in existence today.

1989 – The first woman to play first base in NCAA baseball play took to the field. Julie Croteau played for Division III's St. Mary's College in Maryland.

1988 - The Swedish Amateur Boxing Association sanctioned events for women.

1989 – Arantxa Sanchez beat Steffi Graf to win the Grand Slam of tennis. At only 17 years old she became the first Spanish woman to do so.

=== 1990s ===
1990 - Lesley Visser became the first woman to cover the World Series.

1991 – All new sports applying to be included in the Olympic program were required to feature women's events.

1991 – Algerian middle-distance runner Hassiba Boulmerka became the first African woman to win a world championship in track and field. She won the 1500-meter race.

1991 – The United States won FIFA's first ever Women's World Cup.

1992 – Manon Rhéaume of Canada tried out for the Tampa Bay Lightning; this was the first time a woman tried out for a National Hockey League team. She played one period in a preseason game against the St. Louis Blues, allowing two goals on nine shots, later playing in another preseason game against the Boston Bruins in 1993.

1992 - On 16 April 1992, after eight years in court litigation in Massachusetts, Gail Grandchamp gained the right to become a boxer, as a state Superior Court judge deemed it was illegal to deny someone a chance to box based on gender.

1993 – USA Boxing officially lifted its ban on women's boxing in 1993.

1993 – The American Julie Krone became the first female jockey to win a Triple Crown race when she won the Belmont Stakes.

1993 - On August 3, 1993, Gayle Gardner became the first woman to do televised play-by-play of a baseball game when she called the action of a game between the Colorado Rockies and the Cincinnati Reds.

1993 - The WBA (Women's Basketball Association) played its first official game. It lasted for three seasons.

1993 - Andrea Joyce became the first woman to co-host the network television coverage of the World Series. Joyce co-hosted that particular World Series with Pat O'Brien.

1993 - Dallas Malloy was denied an application by USA Boxing due to being female. She sued and U.S. District Judge Barbara Rothstein allowed her to box by granting a preliminary injunction. In October 1993, Malloy defeated Heather Poyner in the United States’ first sanctioned amateur boxing match between two female boxers. USA Boxing lifted its ban on women's boxing later in 1993. f

1993 - In the 1993 Major League Baseball draft, the Chicago White Sox drafted left handed pitcher Carey Schueler in the 43rd round. She was the first woman ever drafted by a Major League Baseball team. Prior to Schueler's drafting, the MLB had a ban in place on signing contracts for women; following her drafting by the White Sox, the rule was rescinded. However, she did not sign with the White Sox, and instead attended and played basketball for DePaul University in Chicago, Illinois before transferring to St. Mary's College of California, in Moraga, where she continued to play until an injury in 1996.

1993 - Since 1992, the San Francisco Giants have employed older men as “balldudes”, instead of the traditional youths. In 1993, Corinne Mullane became the first "balldudette".

1993 - Don King, the world-famous boxing promoter, signed American boxer Christy Martin in October, making Martin the first female boxer to sign with King.

1994 - Julie Croteau and teammate Lee Anne Ketcham joined the Maui Stingrays of the Hawaii Winter Baseball league for their 1994 season, becoming the first women to play in a Major League Baseball-sanctioned league.

1994 - Keiko Fukuda became the first woman to be awarded a rare red belt (at the time for women still marking the 8th dan rank) in judo by the Kodokan Judo Institute .

1995 – Ila Borders, playing for Southern California College, was the first woman to start as pitcher in a men's collegiate baseball game.

1995 - Hannah Storm not only became the first woman to serve as solo host a World Series game, but also the first woman to preside over the World Series Trophy presentation.

1995 - The New York Golden Gloves allowed women boxers to compete for the first time.

1996 – The first Asian conference on women and sports took place in Manila, the Philippines. Approximately 150 participants from more than 12 Asian nations attended the conference, and discussions culminated in the Manila Declaration on Women and Sport, which declared support for women in sports.

1996 – Women's soccer and women's softball became medal sports at the 1996 Summer Olympics in Atlanta for the first time; both events were won by US teams.

1996 – The first baseball glove made to fit a woman's hand was sold by Spalding Sports.

1996 - On March 16, 1996, a boxing match took place that is often called the fight that "put women's boxing on the map", or "the bout that made women's boxing". It was held in Nevada between American Christy Martin and Irishwoman Deirdre Gogarty. The fight was won by Martin, in a six rounds unanimous decision, and led to her featuring as the first female boxer on the cover of Sports Illustrated on April 15, 1996; the headline read, "The Lady Is a Champ".

1997 – The first WNBA draft was held, with Tina Thompson as the first player selected.

1997 - The first WNBA game was held on 21 June 1997, between the New York Liberty and the Los Angeles Sparks. The Liberty won 67–57.

1997 - The Houston Comets won the first WNBA Championship.

1997 - The Trent Tucker Rule was adopted by the WNBA.

1997 - The first national championship for amateur women's sumo was held in 1997. The rules are identical to professional sumo, with the exception that the wrestlers wear leotards under a mawashi, and the matches last three minutes instead of five minutes like the ones in professional sumo.

1997 - Tonya Butler became the first female to score a field goal in an American college football game.

1997 - The British Amateur Boxing Association sanctioned its first boxing competition for women. The first event was meant to be between two thirteen-year-olds, but one of the boxers dropped out because of hostile media attention. A month later, an event was held between two sixteen-year-olds.

1997 - On October 18, 1997, Liz Heaston became the first woman to play and score in an American college football game, kicking two extra points.

1998 - Karen Thorndike holds the Guinness record as the first American woman to sail solo around the world without assistance. Her voyage was 33,000 miles, which she started at age 53 and completed in 1998 in a 36-foot yacht named Amelia after Amelia Earhart.

1998 - The British Boxing Board of Control initially refused to grant Jane Couch a professional licence on the sole ground that she was a woman, and argued that PMS made women too unstable to box. Claiming sexual discrimination and supported by the Equal Opportunities Commission, Couch managed to have this decision overturned by a tribunal in March 1998.

1998 - The first sanctioned professional boxing match between women in the United Kingdom was in November 1998 at Streatham in London, between Jane Couch and Simona Lukic. Couch won.

1999 – Carolina Morace signed a two-year contract as the coach of Unione Sportiva Viterbese 1908, becoming the first woman to coach an Italian men's professional soccer team.

1999 – Tori Murden became the first woman and the first American to row solo across the Atlantic Ocean.

1999 - NCAA v. Smith, 525 U.S. 459 (1999), was a case in which the Supreme Court of the United States ruled that the NCAA's receipt of dues payments from colleges and universities which received federal funds was not sufficient to subject the NCAA to a lawsuit under Title IX.

== 21st century ==
=== 2000s ===
2000 – German Sandra Farmand won the World Cup snowboard women's cross race.

2000 - The first women's outdoor college basketball game was held: Tennessee defeated the Arizona 67–63.

2000 – The Aggressive Skaters Association created the so-called "Fabiola Rule", after Fabiola da Silva, which allowed women to compete in the formerly all-male vert competition.

2000 - Women's boxing was legalized in Queensland in 2000.

2001 – Jutta Kleinschmidt of Germany became the first woman to win the Paris–Dakar Rally.

2001 - At 15, in 2001, Katie Taylor won the first officially sanctioned female boxing match in Ireland, at the National Stadium, defeating Alanna Audley from Belfast.

2001 - Ashley Martin became the first woman to play and score points in a Division I American college football game on August 30, 2001, when she kicked an extra point in the first quarter of a game against Cumberland University. She would go on to make two more successful extra point attempts in the game, which resulted in a 72–10 Jacksonville State victory.

2001 - In October 2001 the first women's world amateur boxing championships, called the 2001 Women's World Amateur Boxing Championships, were held in Scranton, in the United States.

2001 - Nicola Adams became the first woman boxer ever to represent England, which she did in a fight against an Irish boxer.

2002 - Desi Kontos of South Australia became the first Australian woman to represent the country at the boxing world championships.

2002 - The first McDonald's All-American Game for girls was played, at Madison Square Garden in New York City.

2003 - Katie Hnida became the first woman to score in an NCAA Division I-A game, college football's highest level. She accomplished this as placekicker for the University of New Mexico Lobos on August 30, 2003.

2004 – Lilian Bryner of Switzerland became the first woman to win overall in an international 24-hour auto race when she helped to win the 2004 Spa 24 Hours.

2005 – The American Danica Patrick was the first woman to lead the Indianapolis 500.

2005 – The New York City Marathon awarded the female champion $130,000, compared to just $100,000 for the male winner. It is thought to be the first time a sporting event paid the female winner more than it paid to the male. Additionally, it was the largest prize ever awarded at a marathon.

2005 - On April 2, 2005 Becky Zerlentes was participating in the Colorado State Boxing Senior Female Championships at the Denver Coliseum in Denver, Colorado. She was knocked out in the third round by her opponent, Heather Schmitz, fell unconscious, and died without regaining consciousness. This made Zerlentes the first woman known to have died of injuries sustained during a sanctioned boxing match in the United States. According to the Denver County coroner the cause of death was blunt force trauma to the head.

2005 - Mexican female boxer Jackie Nava became the first woman to win a female world title fight sanctioned by the WBC.

2005 - Fabiola da Silva became the first woman ever to land the double back flip on a vert ramp.

2006 – Julie Wafaei of Canada became the first woman to row across the Atlantic Ocean from mainland to mainland in March.

2006 - In 2006 the Kodokan Judo Institute awarded Keiko Fukuda the 9th degree black belt (9th dan), making her the first woman to hold this rank from any recognized judo organization.

2007 – A year following the French Open, the Wimbledon Championships was the last of the Grand Slam tournament to offer equal prize money.

2007 - Sunita Williams, of the United States, ran the first marathon by any person in space.

2007 - Nicola Adams became the first English female boxer to win a medal in a major boxing tournament, taking silver in the European Championships.

2008 – The American Danica Patrick was the first woman to win an IndyCar Series by winning the 2008 Indy Japan 300.

2008 - Eri Yoshida became the first woman drafted by a Japanese men's professional baseball team.

2008 - Nicola Adams won a silver medal that was Britain's first women's world championship medal in women's boxing.

2009 – Sarah Outen, from Britain, became the first woman to row alone across the Indian Ocean.

2009 - Suzyn Waldman became the first woman to work a World Series game from the broadcast booth.

2009 - Justine Siegal became the first female coach of a men's professional baseball team. In 2011, she was the first woman to throw batting practice to an MLB team, the Cleveland Indians at spring training.

2009 - New South Wales banned women's boxing from 1986 to 2009. Women's boxing was resumed in NSW with an exhibition fight between Kaye Scott and Ramona Stephenson in October 2009.

2009 - Natasha Jonas became the first female boxer to compete for GB Boxing.

=== 2010s ===
2010 – Roz Savage, from England, became the first woman to row solo across the Pacific Ocean.

2010 – The American Kelly Kulick won the 2010 PBA Tournament of Champions, where she was the first-ever female competitor in the field. This also made her the first woman to win any Professional Bowlers Association Tour event that was also open to men.

2010 - Eri Yoshida became the first female baseball player to play professionally in two countries.

2010 - On Tuesday, July 27, 2010, Eri Yoshida made her first road start against the Victoria Seals of the independent Golden Baseball League in Victoria, British Columbia, making her the first woman in baseball history to pitch professionally in three different countries.

2011 – Leena Gade became the first female race engineer to lead a car to win at 24 Hours of Le Mans.

2011 - Justine Siegal was the first woman to throw batting practice to an MLB team, the Cleveland Indians at spring training. She also threw BP to the Oakland Athletics, Tampa Bay Rays, St. Louis Cardinals, Houston Astros, and New York Mets.

2012 – The 2012 Summer Olympics in London were the first Games in which women competed in all sports in the program, and every participating country included female athletes. The U.S. Olympic team had more women than men for the first time — 269 female athletes to 261 men.

2012 - Women were allowed to competitively box for the first time at the Olympics during the 2012 Summer Olympics, in London, producing the world's first 12 female Olympic medalist boxers. Nicola Adams of Great Britain won the world's first Olympic women's boxing gold medal. This win also made her the first openly LGBT person to win an Olympic boxing gold medal. Claressa Shields became the first American woman to win a boxing gold medal. As well, Marlen Esparza became the first American woman to qualify for the Olympics in women's boxing when she qualified for those Olympics. She went on to defeat Karlha Magliocco, making her the first American woman winner of an Olympic boxing match, and to win a bronze medal, making her the first American woman winner of any Olympic boxing medal.

2012 – Felicity Aston, of Britain, became the first person to ski alone across the Antarctic land-mass using only personal muscle power, as well as the first woman to cross the Antarctic land-mass alone.

2012 – The World Rugby launched the competition now known as the World Rugby Women's Sevens Series, analogous to the men's World Rugby Sevens Series.

2012 - The first women's basketball game was played on an aircraft carrier.

2013 - Before the start of the 2013–14 season, the NCAA adopted the 10-second backcourt limit for women's basketball for the first time. Prior to this change, NCAA women's basketball was the only level of basketball in the world that did not have a backcourt possession time limit.

2013 – The American Danica Patrick was the first woman to win a NASCAR Cup Series pole position for the Daytona 500, a week later was the first woman to lead the Daytona 500.

2013 – On her fifth attempt and at age 64, the American Diana Nyad was the first person confirmed to swim from Cuba to Florida without the protection of a shark cage, swimming from Havana to Key West.

2013 – Emily Bell became the first woman to kayak the length of Britain.

2014 – At the 2014 Winter Olympics in Sochi, Russia, Torah Bright, from Australia, became the first woman to qualify for three snowboard disciplines; specifically snowboard cross, halfpipe and slopestyle. The first women competed in ski jumping at the Olympics.

2014 – Alia Atkinson, from Jamaica, won the 100m breaststroke at the 2014 Short Course World Championships in Doha, becoming the first black woman to win a world swimming title.

2014 – Abbey Holmes became the first woman to kick 100 goals in one regular season of Australian Rules football.

2014 – Annabel Anderson, from New Zealand, became the first woman to cross Cook Strait standing on a paddleboard.

2014 – Peta Searle became the first woman appointed as a development coach in the Australian Football League when she was chosen by St Kilda as a development coach.

2014 – 16-year-old Katie Ormerod, from Britain, became the first female snowboarder to land a backside double cork 1080.

2014 – Shelby Osborne became the first female defensive back in American football when she was drafted by Campbellsville University in Kentucky.

2014 – Amélie Mauresmo, from France, became the first woman to coach a top male tennis player (specifically, Andy Murray.)

2014 – Gabrielle Augustine pitched the final two innings for Hunter's Inn, thus becoming the first woman to play in the Glenwood Baseball League, which is the longest-running amateur baseball league in the United States, founded in 1920.

2014 – Tara Remington from New Zealand and Angela Madsen from California became the first female pair of rowers to cross the Pacific Ocean from California to Hawaii; this trip also made Angela Madsen the first paraplegic to row from California to Hawaii.

2014 – Michele A. Roberts was elected as the new executive director of the National Basketball Players Association, thus making her the first woman to be elected to the highest position of a major sport's players association within the United States.

2014 – Corinne Diacre became the first woman to coach a men's professional soccer team (Clermont Foot) in a competitive match in France on August 4, 2014, her 40th birthday.

2014 – Andrea Skews became the first woman to complete the Birdsville Track run from Marree, South Australia, to Birdsville, Queensland.

2014 – Nicola Scaife, from Australia, won the first women's hot air balloon world championship, which was held in Poland.

2014 - On August 5, Becky Hammon, set to retire at the end of the 2014 WNBA season as a player with the San Antonio Stars, was hired as an assistant by the city's NBA team, the Spurs, effective with her retirement from play. Hammon became the first woman to be hired as a full-time coach in any of North America's four major professional leagues.

2014 - On August 15, 2014, Mo'ne Davis was the first girl in Little League World Series history to pitch a winning game (for the Taney Dragons), which also made her the first girl to pitch a shutout in Little League postseason history.

2014 – Cecilia Brækhus, from Norway, became the first Norwegian and the first woman to hold all major world championship titles in her weight division (welterweight) in boxing.

2014 - At the 2014 Commonwealth Games, Lauren Price became the first Welsh woman to win a boxing medal in the Commonwealth Games, winning a bronze.

2014 – Kelly Xu, of Santa Monica, Calif., won the girls 7–9 division in the Drive, Chip and Putt Championship, thus becoming the first female champion ever crowned at Augusta National Golf Club.

2014 – After an announcement on May 31, women competed in medieval combat as a sport for the first time at the International Medieval Combat Federation (IMCF) world championship. American Amy Graham and the women's melee team USA Valkyries (Sandra Lagnese, Karen Prentice, Kati Takacs, Suzanne Lyons Elleraas) won gold medals.

2014 - The International Women's Boxing Hall of Fame, located in America, held its first induction.

2015 – Mieko Nagaoka, a 100-year-old Japanese woman, became the first centenarian to complete a 1500m swim in a 25-meter pool; specifically, she completed 30 laps of the pool in 1 hour, 15 minutes, 54 seconds, in a masters event in Matsuyama, Japan.

2015 – The first African-Americans to place in the top three spots at the 100 yard freestyle in any Women's Division I NCAA Swimming Championship were: Simone Manuel, Lia Neal, and Natalie Hinds in that order.

2015 - On July 2, 2015, Jenny Cavnar became the first woman to provide analysis for a series of National League games in the radio booth, filling in on KOA for the Colorado Rockies vs Arizona Diamondbacks.

2015 - On August 24, 2015, Jessica Mendoza was the first female analyst for a Major League Baseball game in the history of ESPN, during a game between the St. Louis Cardinals and the Arizona Diamondbacks.

2015 - John Kruk, Dan Shulman and Jessica Mendoza called the 2015 American League Wild Card Game on October 6, and Mendoza thus became the first female analyst in Major League Baseball postseason history.

2015 – Saina Nehwal became the first Indian women's player to be World No.1 in badminton.

2015 - Justine Siegal became the Oakland Athletics guest instructor for their Instructional League Club, thus making her the first female coach in major league baseball history.

2015 – Diane Reid became the first Canadian woman to be appointed as skipper in the world's longest ocean race, the Clipper Round the World Yacht Race. In the same race, Wendy Tuck became the first Australian woman to be appointed as skipper.

2015 – Alia Al Shamsi became the first Emirati female swimmer to represent the country's national team, which she did at the Arab Age Group Swimming Championships.

2015 – The 70th Women's Boat Race was held on The Championship Course in London, England on the same day as the traditional male event for the first time on April 11.

2015 – The World Series of Poker Circuit had its first female main event champion when the American Michelle Chin won the Horseshoe Council Bluffs $1,675 Main Event.

2015 – Kieran Ballard-Tremeer, from South Africa, became the first woman to swim around the Palm Jumeirah; she completed the 14.5 km-distance swim around it in a time of four hours and 28 minutes, swimming inside the breakwater of Palm Jumeirah.

2015 – The American McKenna Haase became the first woman to win a feature Sprint Car race at Knoxville Raceway.

2015 – The first American all-girls national baseball tournament was held.

2015 – The first known all-girls tackle football league in America, the Utah Girls Tackle Football League, was formed.

2015 – Melissa Mayeux of France became the first female baseball player to be added to Major League Baseball's international registration list.

2015 – New Zealand native Kim Chambers became the first woman to swim the 30-mile stretch between the Farallon Islands and San Francisco.

2015 – Tickets for the Women's Singles final of the 2015 US Open of tennis sold out faster than the Men's final, a first in tournament history.

2015 – Sarah Taylor, from England, became the first woman to play men's grade cricket in Australia, when she appeared as wicketkeeper for Northern Districts against Port Adelaide at Salisbury Oval in South Australia's premier men's competition.

2015 – Afghanistan held its first marathon; among those who ran the entire marathon was one woman, Zainab, who thus became the first Afghan woman to run in a marathon within her own country.

2015 – Michelle Payne, from Australia, became the first female jockey to win the Melbourne Cup.

2015 – Michelle Rowe, from the United Kingdom, became the first woman to walk the length of Malawi.

2015 – The Raleigh Flyers of the American Ultimate Disc League signed the first ever female professional ultimate frisbee player, Jessi Jones, to play in their game against the Nashville Nightwatch. Jones, who was a team USA U-23 player in 2013, was signed as part of "Women's Ultimate Day".

2015 - Laura Serrano became the first female Mexican boxer inducted into the International Women's Boxing Hall of Fame.

2015 - The 2016 Outdoor Women's Classic presented by Scotiabank was an ice hockey game played on December 31, 2015, at Gillette Stadium in Foxborough, Massachusetts, between the Boston Pride of the National Women's Hockey League and Les Canadiennes of the Canadian Women's Hockey League. It was the first outdoor ice hockey game between professional women's teams; it ended in a 1–1 tie.

2016 – Kaillie Humphries, from Canada, became the first woman to drive an all-female team against men in a four-person World Cup bobsled race on January 9; her teammates were Cynthia Appiah, Genevieve Thibault and Melissa Lotholz.

2016 – Chan Yuen-ting of Hong Kong became the first woman to coach a men's professional association football (soccer) team to the championship of a nation's top league. The following year, she became the first woman to coach a male football (soccer) club in a top-flight continental competition when she managed a team against Guangzhou Evergrande in the AFC Champions League.

2016 - For one day in May 2016, Jennie Finch was a guest manager for the Bridgeport Bluefish of the Atlantic League, becoming the first woman to manage a professional baseball team. The team played and won one game that day.

2016 - Christy Martin became the first female boxer inducted into the Nevada Boxing Hall of Fame.

2016 - With their eleventh championship win in 2016, the UConn Huskies (38–0) passed the UCLA Bruins men's team for most college basketball championships, and became the first Division 1 women's basketball team to win four straight national championships.

2016 - Breanna Stewart was named the AP Player Of The Year, making her the first female college basketball player to win that award three times.

2016 - Breanna Stewart was named the Most Outstanding Player of the Final Four, making her the first person to be most outstanding player of the Final Four four times.

2017 – In the 2017 season, Jesse Shofner was selected to the roster for the Nashville Nightwatch, which made her the first female player to make a full season American Ultimate Disc League roster. She scored two goals in the Nashville Nightwatch's first game of the 2017 season, making her the first woman to do so in any American Ultimate Disc League game.

2017 – Ana Carrasco of Spain became the first woman to win an individual world championship motorcycle race, when she won the FIM Supersport 300 World Championship.

2017 – Spain's Alhambra Nievas and Ireland's Joy Neville become the first and second women referees to take charge of men's rugby union internationals when they refereed matches in the Rugby Europe Conference.

2018 – The first all-female group crossed Antarctica using muscle power alone; they were all British.

2018 - Fabiana Bytyqi became the first female boxer from the Czech Republic to win a major world title, when she defeated Denise Castle to win the vacant WBC atomweight title. The fight took place at the Sportcentrum Sluneta in Ústí nad Labem, on 22 September 2018. She won the fight by unanimous decision, with two judges awarding her a 100–90 scorecard, while the third judge awarded her a 99–91 scorecard.

2018 – Katie Sarah, from Australia, became the first woman to summit the highest mountain on every continent and the seven highest volcanic peaks, an accomplishment known as the 'Seven-Seven'.

2018 – Terra Roam of Australia became the first woman to walk solo and unsupported around Australia.

2018 – Wendy Tuck of Australia became the first female skipper to win the Clipper Round the World Yacht Race (or any Round the World yacht race).

2018 - American major boxing broadcasting network HBO broadcast its first women's bout, between Norway's Cecilia Brækhus and America's Kali Reis, on May 5, 2018, which Brækhus won.

2019 – Mariko Yugeta of Japan became the first woman in the world over 60 to run a sub-3-hour marathon; she ran 2:59:15 at the Shimonoseki Kaikyo Marathon at the age of 61.

2019 – Caitlin Nash and Natalie Corless, both of Canada, became the first all-female team to compete in a World Cup doubles race in luge.

2019 - Rachel Balkovec became the first woman hired to be a full-time hitting coach for a Major League Baseball team.

2019 - Fallon Sherrock became the first woman to beat a man at the PDC World Championships, beating Ted Evetts 3–2 in the first round at the 2020 World Championship.

2019 - Mink Nutcharut made a 147 in a practice match, believed to be the first maximum break achieved by a woman in any match.

2019 - Justine Siegal became the first woman to coach Japanese professional baseball.

2019 - Justine Siegal became the first woman to coach professional baseball in Mexico.

2019 - Sadaf Khadem defeated French boxer Anne Chauvin in a boxing match in France on April 14, 2019; this made her the first Iranian woman to be part of an official boxing match. However, the Iranian Boxing Federation distanced itself from the match and released a statement reading:

As women's boxing is not a sanctioned sport of the Islamic Republic of Iran Boxing Federation, the organization, training, and participation in this sport is not related to this federation and it is the organizer and participant's responsibilities.

Following the match, Khadem had plans to return to Iran, but lingering rumors of potential arrest warrants kept her in France. Khadem's representative told Reuters that authorities had issued arrest warrants against her. Hossein Soori, the head of Iran's boxing federation, denied Khadem would be arrested, attributing the information to “media linked to Saudi Arabia”.

2019 - The first female boxing club in the Gaza Strip, the Palestinian Center of Boxing for Women, opened.

2019 - Lucia Rijker became one of the first three women boxers (and the first Dutch woman boxer) elected to the International Boxing Hall of Fame; 2019 was the first year that women were on the ballot. The other two were Barbara Buttrick of England and Christy Martin of America.

=== 2020s ===
2020 - Lisa Ashton became the first woman to win a PDC Tour card through Q School.

2020 - Sabrina Ionescu of the United States became the first college basketball player to collect 2,000 points, 1,000 assists, and 1,000 rebounds playing for the Oregon Ducks, during her college career at the University of Oregon.

2020 - In October 2020 Jessica Mendoza became the first female World Series analyst on any national broadcast platform; she was on ESPN's radio platform.

2020 - Alyssa Nakken became the first full-time female coach in Major League Baseball history and the first to coach on the field during a major league pre-season game, with the San Francisco Giants.

2020 - Kim Ng became the first woman to be named General Manager of a Major League Baseball team, when the Miami Marlins officially announced the hire on November 13, 2020.

2020 - Becky Hammon was the first female to act as the head coach during the San Antonio Spurs versus Lakers game on December 30, 2020, when head coach Gregg Popovich was ejected in the second quarter.

2020 - Sarah Fuller became the first woman to play in a football game for a Power Five team, which she did for Vanderbilt against Missouri.

2020 - Sarah Fuller kicked an extra point following a first-quarter touchdown to become the first woman to score in a Power Five football game.

2020 - Katie Sowers, as the offensive assistant coach for the San Francisco 49ers, was the first female coach in Super Bowl history, in addition to being the first Super Bowl coach who was part of the LGBTQ community.

2021 - In January 2021, the Boston Red Sox hired Bianca Smith as a minor league coach. With the hire, Smith was the first black woman to become a coach in professional baseball.

2021 - Sarah Thomas made history being the first female referee to officiate a Super Bowl, namely Super Bowl LV.

2021 - Rachael Blackmore won the Grand National, becoming the first female jockey to win the race.

2021 - Desiree Linden completed a 50K in 2:59:54, becoming the first woman ever to run 50 km under 3 hours and breaking the world record (previously 3:07:20 by Aly Dixon on September 1, 2019). This was Linden's first ultramarathon.

2021 - At the 2021 World Indoor Bowls Championship Ellen Falkner became the first female player to reach the final of the open pairs event (playing with Greg Harlow).

2021 - In 2021, an all-female broadcast crew called a Major League Baseball game for the first time; specifically, Sarah Langs Heidi Watney, Lauren Gardner, Melanie Newman and Alanna Rizzo called a YouTube Game of the Week featuring the Baltimore Orioles and Tampa Bay Rays at Tropicana Field.

2021 - The first WNBA Commissioner's Cup, delayed from its originally planned 2020 launch due to COVID-19 issues, was held, with the Seattle Storm defeating the Connecticut Sun in the Cup final in Phoenix.

2021 - Ramla Ali competed in the women's featherweight event at the 2020 Summer Olympics. Although she lost her first fight, she became the first boxer ever to represent Somalia on the Olympic stage.

2021 - Lauren Price became the first Welsh boxer of any gender to win an Olympic gold medal.

2021 - Kristie Elliott became the first Canadian woman to play, and to score, in an NCAA football game, which she did on September 11, 2021, as a kicker for Simon Fraser University.

2022 - In January 2022, Brenna Huckaby, classified as a SB-LL1 snowboarder, won a court decision to allow her to compete at the 2022 Winter Paralympics; this was previously not permitted as there are no SB-LL1 events for female snowboarders in the snowboarding programme. She won the gold medal in the women's banked slalom SB-LL2 event. She also won the bronze medal in the women's snowboard cross SB-LL2 event.

2022 - On January 11, 2022, the Yankees announced that Rachel Balkovec would manage the Low-A Tampa Tarpons in 2022, making her the first woman to manage in affiliated baseball.

2022 - Kelsie Whitmore became the first woman to start an Atlantic League of Professional Baseball game on May 1, playing as a left fielder.

2022 - On May 4, Kelsie Whitmore became the first woman to pitch in an Atlantic League of Professional Baseball game; entering the game with the bases loaded and two outs, she retired Ryan Jackson, a former major leaguer, on a fly out to end the inning.

2022 - Jaida Lee, at 16 years old, was in August 2022 the first female baseball player to compete in men's baseball at the Canada Summer Games.

2022 - Hollie Doyle rode to a narrow victory in the French Oaks, becoming the first female jockey to win a European Group 1 Classic. (Note: In 2021 Sibylle Vogt won the German 1,000 Guineas, a Group 2 race.)

2022 - Andrea Martínez became Mexico's first female college football kicker.

2022 - Alyssa Nakken became the first woman to coach on the field in a regular season major league baseball game on April 12, 2022, when the San Francisco Giants substituted Nakken into the game as the first base coach after Antoan Richardson was ejected during the top of the third inning of a game against the San Diego Padres.

2022 - A Mexican women's professional basketball league (Liga Nacional de Baloncesto Profesional Femenil) was formed and played its first matches on 23 April.

2022 - Women became allowed to participate officially in the sport of boxing in Cuba, for the first time since they were banned from doing so during the Revolution of Fidel Castro in 1959.

2022 - Somalian boxer Ramla Ali defeated Dominican boxer Crystal Garcia Nova in the first professional women's boxing match held in Saudi Arabia.

2022 - Two female boxers headlined at a major venue in the United Kingdom for the first time, which occurred at the O2 Arena. That fight was a title unification bout between Claressa Shields and Savannah Marshall. Shields won via unanimous decision with two judges scoring the fight 97–93 and one scoring it 96–94, all in favor of Shields to become the undisputed middleweight world champion. As well, the fight headlined the first all-female boxing card in the United Kingdom.

2022 - Chantelle Cameron defeated Jessica McCaskill in a match held in Abu Dhabi, making Cameron the undisputed world light-welterweight champion and the United Kingdom's first undisputed female boxing world champion.

2022 - Natasha Jonas won the British Boxing Board of Control's 2022 British Boxer of the Year award, which made her the first woman to win the British Boxing Board of Control's British Boxer of the Year Award.

2022 - The first women's boxing match to headline Madison Square Garden, described as the 'biggest women's fight of all time', was held on April 30, 2022, between Katie Taylor and Amanda Serrano, with Taylor's undisputed lightweight titles on the line. Taylor defeated Serrano by split decision.

2022 - In November 2022, Olivia Pichardo became the first woman chosen for any Division I baseball roster when she was chosen for that of Brown University.

2023 - In January 2023, Veronica Gajownik was hired to manage the Hillsboro Hops, which made her the first woman to manage a Class High-A baseball team, and the first openly LGBTQ manager in minor or major league baseball history.

2023 - Olivia Pichardo became the first woman to play in a Division I baseball game on March 17, 2023, pinch-hitting for Brown University.

2023 - On 6 May 2023, Lauren Price won the first British women's title fight in professional boxing history, becoming the first female British welterweight champion and the first woman to receive a Lonsdale Belt, by defeating Kirstie Bavington by unanimous points victory.

2023 - On 23 June 2023, during Tony Hawk's Vert Alert event held in Salt Lake City, Arisa Trew became the first female skateboarder to successfully execute a 720 trick in a competition; the trick involves completing two full rotations in mid-air.

2023 - In July 2023, Olivia Pichardo became the first woman to hit a home run while playing in the Hamptons Collegiate Baseball League; she was playing for the Sag Harbor Whalers.

2023 - On July 28, 2023, Katie Lamb did the first female ascent of Daniel Woods' 2018 route, Box Therapy 8C+ (V16), at the RMNP, becoming the first female climber ever to climb an 8C+ (V16) graded boulder route.

2023 - Justine Siegal became the first woman to coach in the Mexican Baseball League.

2023 - Jocelyn Alo became the first woman to play for the Savannah Bananas, getting an at bat in one of their games.

2023 - Women competed in boxing at the Canada Games for the first time. Talia Birch of Team Quebec and Emily Vigneault of Team Alberta won the first Canada Games gold medals for boxing in their divisions; Birch won in the 52-kg female division and Vigneault won in the 60-kg female division. Those were the only female divisions in boxing in the 2023 Canada Games.

2023 - Ragad Al-Naimi became the first Saudi female professional boxer, by having her first professional fight; she won against Perpetual Okaidah in a fight held in Diriyah.

2023 - New York boxer Kathy “Wildcat” Collins became the first female boxer inducted into the New York State Boxing Hall of Fame.

2023 - Molly Smith became the first woman to qualify for the golf competition called the Massachusetts State Amateur.

2023 - Rebecca Lee was appointed as Formula 1's official race starter, making her the first female permanent Formula 1 race starter.

2023 - Maya Turner became the first woman to play in any U Sports regular season football game, on September 23, 2023, as a Manitoba Bisons kicker. She kicked the game winning field goal in overtime for the Bisons in their game against the Regina Rams.

2023 - Jackson State Tigers placekicker Leilani Armenta became the first woman to score in an HBCU game, scoring three extra points in an October 29, 2023 game against the University of Arkansas at Pine Bluff.

2023 - Jenn Drummond, of America, became the first woman to climb the "Seven Second Summits", meaning the second-highest peak on each continent.

2023 - Michelle Lee of Australia became the first woman to row solo across the Pacific Ocean without stopping and unassisted, which she did beginning in 2022 and ending in 2023.

2024 - Ruru Yang Sheau-ru became Hong Kong's first woman professional boxer to win a world title, due to winning the Women's International Boxing Association super bantamweight belt by defeating Tanwarat Saengiamjit from Thailand. The match was held in Bangkok.

2024 - In 2024, but before the 2024 season, it was announced that the Oakland Athletics hired Jenny Cavnar as their full-time play-by-play announcer, making her the first female primary play-by-play announcer in Major League Baseball history.

2024 - It was announced that Jocelyn Alo had become the first female member of the Savannah Bananas, by signing a one-month contract with them.

2024 - On February 28, Caitlin Clark passed Lynette Woodard, who played for Kansas in the era when the Association of Intercollegiate Athletics for Women governed women's college sports, to become the all-time leader in points among major women's college players.

2024 - Caitlin Clark established the NCAA Division I all-time scoring record with 3,951 points. She also set the career mark for three-point field goals (548), and single-season marks for points (1,234), becoming the first player to lead the country three times, and three-pointers made (201).

2024 - Cole Brauer became the first woman from the United States to sail single-handed around the world nonstop and unassisted.

2024 - Philippa Morris, of London, became the first woman to complete the Jordan Ultra Challenge, in which over two days those doing the challenge run two marathons in Jordan.

2024 - On 14 March 2024 it was announced that Lauren Price would challenge Jessica McCaskill for her WBA, IBO, and Ring female welterweight World titles on 11 May 2024 in Cardiff, Wales. Price won the contest by unanimous technical decision after an accidental clash of heads that took place in the fifth round caused an injury to McCaskill's eye and she was ruled unable to continue at the start of round nine. This win made Price Wales’ first female professional boxing world champion.

2024 - On May 13, 2024, in a game between the Oakland Athletics and the Houston Astros, Jenny Cavnar and Julia Morales became the first two women to do the play-by-play on television for the same Major League Baseball game.

2024 - On May 29, 2024, Arisa Trew became the first female skateboarder to land a 900, which she did in a half-pipe.

2024 - On June 6, 2024, Kelsie Whitmore became the first female player to start a Pioneer League game.

2024 - Jamie Chadwick became the first woman in Indy NXT history to claim a road course pole and road course win.

2024 - Audrey Jimenez of Arizona became the first female wrestler to win a high school wrestling state title while wrestling against boys.

2024 - Jessica Campbell was hired to be the assistant coach for the Seattle Kraken, making her the first female coach to be behind the bench in NHL history.

2024 - Cathy Babis became the first woman to circumnavigate Australia in a seaplane.

2024 - On September 21, 2024, Ella Lord became the first woman to play in the Atlantic Football League, playing for the UNB Reds.

2024 - On October 12, 2024, Shanda Hill, from Canada, became the first woman to finish the Triple Deca Ultra Triathlon.

2024 - On October 12, 2024, Skye Nicolson of Australia defeated Raven Chapman of the United Kingdom in what was the first women's world title boxing fight held in Saudi Arabia and the first women's bout to be on a Riyadh Season show. She won by unanimous decision.

== See also ==
- Timeline of women's basketball
