= Women's gridiron football =

American football practiced by women

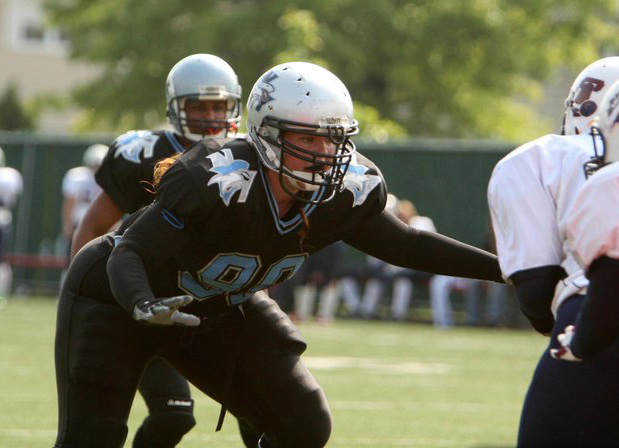
Sarah Schkeeper in a game between the New York Sharks and the Philadelphia Firebirds

Women's gridiron football, more commonly known as women's tackle football, women's American football, women's Canadian football, or simply women's football, is a form of gridiron football (American or Canadian) played by women. Most leagues play by similar rules to the men's game. Women primarily play on a semi-professional or amateur level in the United States. Very few high schools or colleges offer the sport solely for women and girls. However, on occasion, it is permissible for a female player to join the otherwise male team.

== History ==
Women and girls were playing tackle football not long after the sport was invented in the 1880s, often in educational settings. For over 70 years, however, female involvement in football was reported in the media as a novel "spectacle". According to The Women's Football Encyclopedia, during this period, "powder bowl" events were "unusual and nonrecurring, and they were universally treated by the press as more farce than competitive football."

=== 1890s and early participation ===
The first recorded instance of women playing football in the United States was in 1892, when students at the Philadelphia School of Design for Women played with "modified tackling rules". Starting in the 1890s, there were also numerous articles alluding to students at women's colleges playing football, at Wellesley College in Massachusetts and at Vassar College in New York. However, sports historian Katie Taylor questions the veracity of these accounts, and suggests that any games that did take place at Seven Sisters schools during these years were informal rather than competitive.

On November 21, 1896, a men's social club in New York set up a scrimmage between two teams of five women each, wearing the colors of Yale and Princeton, outside the casino at Sulzer's Harlem River Park, as entertainment before a masked ball. The Sun reported that after only a few plays, the local police captain had to step in to halt the event, after the crowd of men watching the women tackling each other started pushing, and it looked like someone could get crushed. In 1897, the San Francisco Grays played against the Oakland Browns, winning 20 to 8, in a women's football game played at the Velodrome under rugby rules.

=== 1920s ===
On December 8, 1922, Maui High School in the Territory of Hawaii held the first of two girls' football games that month with a team of sophomores and seniors playing against a team of juniors and freshman. The Maui News described it as "a game which afforded much amusement to the masculine element", but also noted that "The Hi girls proved that when it comes to grit, they're there with the goods." In 1925, a woman's football game played at San Jose State Teachers' College between two teams drawn from the school's gymnasium classes was covered by the Associated Press and The New York Times.

On November 6, 1926, the Frankford Yellow Jackets of Philadelphia, who went on to win the NFL championship that year, featured "Lady Yellow Jackets" as halftime entertainment during their game against the Chicago Cardinals, in front of an audience of 8,000. Although the NFL connection has led many to pinpoint this event as the start of women's football, a detailed account in the Philadelphia Public Ledger makes it clear that it was nothing more than a comedy act. The eleven Lady Yellow Jackets danced the Charleston, and the team they faced consisted of two old men. Furthermore, there is no evidence to suggest that this was more than a one-time event, or that other NFL franchises had similar ladies' "teams".

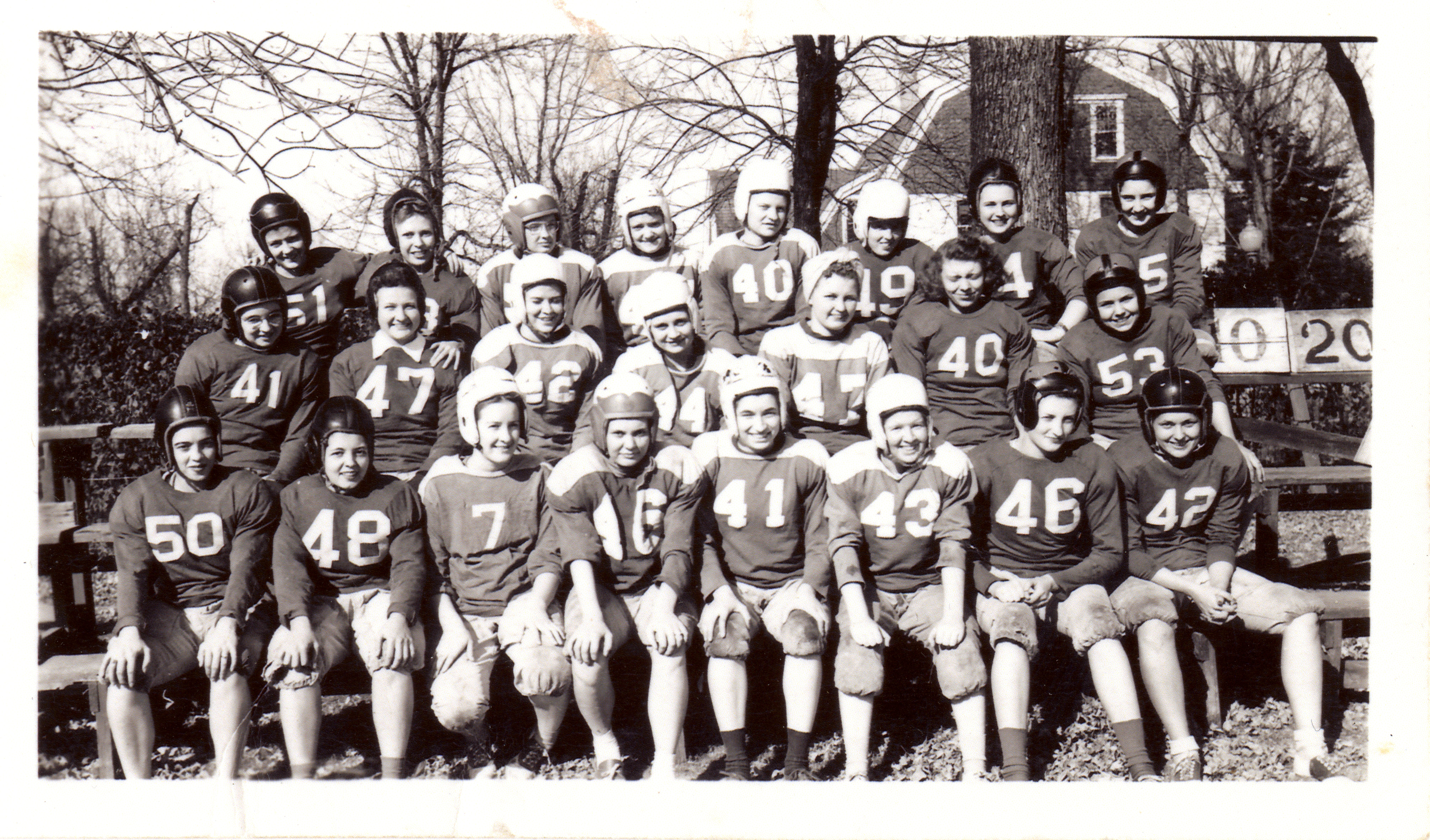
The Eastern State Women's Football Team, 1945

=== 1930s ===
A few women's football leagues emerged in the 1930s, including one in Ohio in 1934 and another in Los Angeles in 1939, but were short-lived.

=== 1960s and 1970s: Formalization and professional football ===
The women's game started to formalize in the 1960s, after entrepreneur Sid Friedman founded the Women's Professional Football League in 1965. By 1973, all WPFL teams had disbanded except for the Toledo Troopers of Toledo, Ohio. The Troopers then joined the new National Women's Football League (NWFL), which operated from 1974 to 1988.

Patricia Palinkas is on record as being the first female professional football player, having played for the Orlando Panthers of the Atlantic Coast Football League in 1970. Palinkas was a placekick holder for her placekicker husband.

=== 1990s and 2000s: Entry into college football ===
On October 18, 1997, Liz Heaston became the first woman to play and score in a college football game, kicking two extra points. Prior to this game, female athletes at Duke and Louisville had come close to playing in a game but did not. In 2001, Ashley Martin became the second female athlete to score in a college football game, this time in the NCAA.

In 2003, Katie Hnida became the first woman to score in an NCAA Division I-A game. She accomplished this as placekicker for the University of New Mexico Lobos on August 30, 2003. She later became the second professional player, when she signed with the Fort Wayne FireHawks.

In professional leagues, the Women's Professional Football League operated again between 1999 and 2007 as a fall league and not a spring league.

In 2001, Philadelphia Liberty Belles player Alissa Wykes of the National Women's Football Association (NWFA) came out publicly as lesbian.

=== 2010s and 2020s ===
In 2013, Lauren Silberman became the first woman to try out at the NFL Regional Scouting Combine. Silberman tried out for the NFL after playing club soccer in college and taking up kicking footballs as a hobby several months before the tryout. During her tryout, she met with medical staff to address a leg injury after making two kicks, and did not complete the remaining kicks.

Julie Harshbarger, a placekicker for numerous Chicago-based Continental Indoor Football League teams, became the first female player to win a most valuable player award in an otherwise all-male league in 2014. By kicking five field goals that season, she earned the title of special teams player of the year, leading all kickers in the league in scoring; with a career spanning seven seasons, Harshbarger's career was the longest documented of any woman playing in a predominantly men's professional league.

Jennifer Welter became the first female skill position player at the male professional level by playing as a running back in the Texas Revolution in 2014.

In 2020, Sarah Fuller became the first woman to play in a Power Five football game when she took the opening kickoff of the second half of the Vanderbilt Commodores' game against the Missouri Tigers with a 30-yard squib kick on November 28, 2020. (The term "Power Five" was not in use when Katie Hnida became the first woman to score in an NCAA Division I-A game in 2003; Hnida played at the Mountain West Conference, which did not have Automatic Qualifying status in the Bowl Championship Series.)

== Women in college and professional football ==
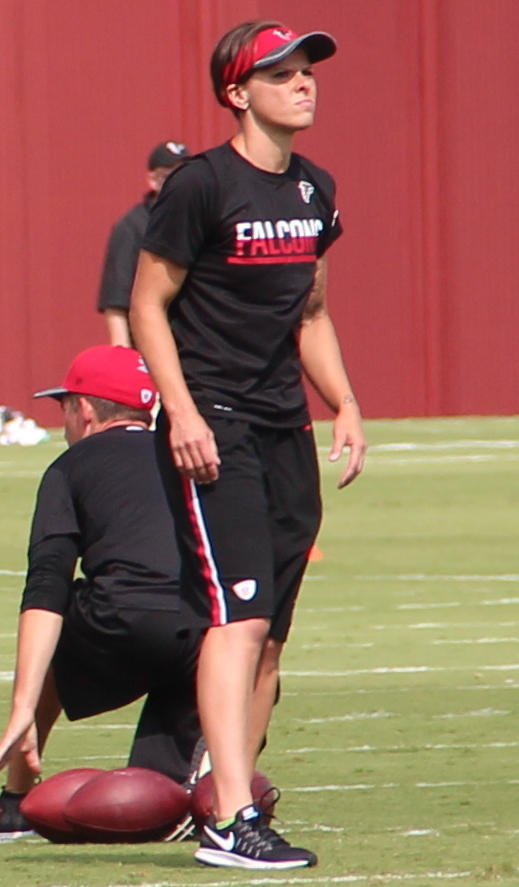
Katie Sowers made history as the first openly LGBTQ+ coach in the NFL and the second woman to hold a full-time coaching position in the league.

Of the women who have seen action in men's college and pro football, almost all have been in special teams positions that are protected from physical contact. The first professional player was a placekick holder (a position usually occupied by a person who holds another position on the team), while the best known female college football players were all placekickers, with all having primarily played women's soccer prior to converting.

To date, no women have ever played a line position above the high school level. Holley Mangold, whose brother Nick played several years in the NFL and who herself played as a lineswoman in high school, declined to further pursue football in college, fearing she had no chance to play professionally as a woman; she later went on to become an Olympic weightlifter.

=== Coaches ===
Brittanee Jacobs is the first female football coach at the collegiate level. She helped coach safeties at Central Methodist University during the 2012 season. Welter became the first female coach at the professional level when she took a preseason position with the Arizona Cardinals in 2015; a year later, Kathryn Smith, who had spent several years as a front office assistant, took a quality control coaching position with the Buffalo Bills, making her the first permanent female coach in National Football League history.

In 2020, Callie Brownson became the first woman to coach an NFL position group in a regular-season game when she filled in for the Cleveland Browns tight ends coach Drew Petzing.

== International competition ==
The world governing body for American football associations, the International Federation of American Football (IFAF), held the first Women's World Cup in Stockholm, Sweden, in 2010. Six nations participated in the inaugural event: Austria, Canada, Finland, Germany, Sweden, and the United States. The United States won the gold by beating Canada, 66–0. The 2013 World Championship, in Finland, was held from 30 June 2013 to 7 July 2013. The United States won gold again, beating Sweden 84-0 and Germany 107–7 in order to make it to the gold medal match with Canada, whom they beat 64–0. In the 2017 IFAF Women's World Championship, held in Canada, the six teams invited were; Australia, Canada, Finland, Great Britain, Mexico and the United States. The United States continued their dominance, claiming gold, while Canada and Mexico won silver and bronze respectively.

IFAF has confirmed Palma, located on the Spanish island of Mallorca, Spain as host for 2021 IFAF Flag Football World Championship from October 6 to 10 2021. It will be the first time Spain has staged the World Championships which have been held since 1998. Normally conducted every two years, Denmark was scheduled to host the 2020 edition only for it to be cancelled due to the coronavirus pandemic.

== Leagues ==
Leagues play American football unless otherwise noted.

=== United States ===
- IconWFA Premier League of Texas (IWFA) (8 on 8)
- Women's Football Alliance (WFA)
- United States Women's Football League (USWFL)
- Extreme Football League (X League - Formerly Legends Football League)
- American Women's Football League (AWFL)
- Women's National Football Conference (WNFC)
- Xtreme Female Football League of Texas (XFFL) (8 on 8)
- Women's Tackle Football League (WTFL)
- Utah Girls Football League (GFL) (youth/high school level)

=== Canada ===
- Maritime Women's Football League (MWFL) (Canadian football)
- Western Women's Canadian Football League (WWCFL) (Canadian football)
- Central Canadian Women's Football League (CCWFL) (Canadian football)

=== Australia ===
- Gridiron Australia
- Female Gridiron League of Queensland
- Ladies Football League
- Ladies Gridiron League
- Women's Gridiron Leagues of Australia
- Gridiron West (WA)
- Gridiron NSW

=== Europe ===
- Legends Football League Europa (LFL) (Debut 2015)
- Austrian Football Division Ladies (AFL Division Ladies) (Debut 2000)
- BAFA National Women's Football League (NWFL) (BAFA Women's)

=== Finland ===
- Naisten vaahteraliiga

=== Germany ===
- Damenbundesliga
- 2. Damenbundesliga
- Aufbauliga NRW

=== Mexico ===
- Football Xtremo Femenil
- Asociación de Football Femenil Equipado
- Liga Mexicana de Football Lingerie
- Pretty Girls Football League
- Liga Iberoamericana de Bikini Football
- Women's Football League

=== American defunct leagues ===
- Women's Professional Football League (WPFL) 1965–1973
- National Women's Football League (NWFL) 1974–1988
- Western States Women's Professional Football League (WSWPFL) 1978–1980
- Women's Tackle Football Association (WTFA) 1988–1990
- Women's Professional Football League (WPFL) 1999–2008
- National Women's Football Association (NWFA) 2000–2009
- Independent Women's Football League (IWFL) 2001–2018
- Women's American Football League (WAFL) 2001–2003
- Women's Affiliate Football Conference (WAFC) 2002
- United Women's Football League (UWFL) 2002
- American Football Women's League (AFWL) 2002–2003
- Women's Football Association (WFA) 2002–2003
- Ladies Tackle Football League (LTFL) (Central California, disbanded circa 2004?)
- Women's Football League (WFL) 2002–2007
- Women's Arena Football League (WAFL) 2011–2013

== See also ==
- List of female American football players
- Powderpuff (sports)
- Utah Girls Tackle Football League
- List of female American football teams
