= List of female gridiron football players =

Women's gridiron football (including American football and Canadian football) is a form of the sport played by women. Most leagues in the United States, such as the Women's Football Alliance, play by rules similar to men's tackle football. Although women's flag football is emerging as a collegiate sport, women playing gridiron football at the college level have historically joined men's teams, often (though not exclusively) as placekickers.

The following is a list of some of the most notable female American football players.

== Players in predominantly male football leagues ==
- Kristie Elliott – First Canadian woman to play, and to score, in an NCAA football game, which she did on September 11, 2021, as a kicker for Simon Fraser University.
- Lily Godwin - A University of Puget Sound player who made a solo tackle on Oct. 21, 2023. Therefore she is the first woman in University of Puget Sound football history and "believed to be the first female in NCAA history" to record a solo tackle in any game, according to the NCAA itself.
- Julie Harshbarger – First woman to score a field goal in a professional indoor football game, as placekicker for the Chicago Cardinals in the CIFL on April 24, 2010. Harshbarger was named CIFL Special Teams Player of the Year for 2014, as kicker for the Chicago Blitz, and as the AIF Special Teams Player of the Year for 2015, after the Blitz changed leagues.
- Katie Hnida – Placekicker for the Fort Wayne FireHawks of the Continental Indoor Football League (CIFL) in 2010. She played in the first three games of the season, but developed a blood clot in her kicking leg. Hnida went on to become a kicker for the Colorado Cobras in the Colorado Football Conference, and for the KC Mustangs in the Interstate Football League. (See also "College players" below.)
- Ella Lord – First woman to play in the Atlantic Football League, playing for the UNB Reds on September 21, 2024.
- Patricia Palinkas – First woman to play professional football, debuting on August 15, 1970, as a holder for her placekicker husband on the Orlando Panthers of the minor-league Atlantic Coast Football League. She played two games in the preseason but left after Steve Palinkas was injured and cut from the team.
- Jasmine Plummer – First female quarterback for a Pop Warner football team. At the age of 11 years old, she became the first female quarterback and the first black female athlete to play in the Pop Warner Super Bowl youth football tournament, specifically the 56th Annual Pop Warner Super Bowl (Junior Pee Wee division); however, her team, the Harvey Colts, lost in the semifinals.
- Grace Reza - While playing for the Middlesex Chargers of Middlesex High in 2025, she became the first girl to score a touchdown for any Virginia public high school.
- Morgan Smith – First female player in the Empire Football League, as placekicker for the Glens Falls Greenjackets in 2022.
- Melissa Strother – First female player to score a point in the Arena Football League, which occurred on May 12, 2024, when she made an extra point while playing as kicker for the Washington Wolfpack. Strother had also been with Champions Indoor Football's Rapid City Marshals before joining the AFL along with the rest of that league in 2023.
- Maya Turner – First woman to play in a U Sports regular season football game, which she did on September 23, 2023, as a Manitoba Bisons kicker. She kicked the game winning field goal in overtime for the Bisons in their game against the Regina Rams.
- Abby Vestal – First woman to score points in a men's professional football game, kicking three out of four extra points on April 23, 2007, for the Kansas Koyotes of the indoor American Professional Football League, as a high school senior. She was replaced with a college kicker after her fourth game. Vestal went on to play women's tackle football for the Kansas City Storm.
- Jennifer Welter – First woman to play in a non-kicking or skill position in a men's professional football league, as running back for the Texas Revolution of the Indoor Football League in 2014. In 2015, Welter became the first female coach in a men's professional football league, after joining the coaching staff of the Revolution. That year, she also became the first female NFL coach as an intern with the Arizona Cardinals, coaching inside linebackers at training camp and during the preseason.

== Players in predominantly female football leagues ==
Players in traditional ("full pads") tackle football leagues.

=== 1960s and 1970s ===
- Marcella Sanborn – Quarterback, Cleveland Daredevils (from 1967), called "the first true 'star' of women's football", playing for the first women's tackle football team. Named Bud Collins's Athlete of the Year for 1967 in The Boston Globe.
- Linda Jefferson – Halfback, Toledo Troopers (1972–1979), seven-time national champions (WPFL, NWFL). One of only four women inducted into the American Football Association Hall of Fame. Named the 1975 Athlete of the Year by womenSports, the first magazine dedicated exclusively to covering women in sports. Posted five consecutive 1,000-yard seasons rushing.
- Barbara Patton – Linebacker, Los Angeles Dandelions (1973–1975). In 1974, Patton was featured in a nationally syndicated newspaper article ("Mom, 32, Tries Football"), as linebacker, PBX operator, and single mother of two children, including her son Marvcus, age 7. Throughout his career as an NFL linebacker, Marvcus Patton went on to frequently mention the influence of his mother Barbara as a former linebacker herself.

=== 21st century ===
- Callie Brownson: Safety/running back, D.C. Divas (2010–2017). Two-time gold medalist for Team USA in the 2013 and 2017 IFAF Women's World Championships. Became the first female assistant football coach in the NCAA's Division I when she was hired by the Dartmouth Big Green football team. Currently an assistant coach of the Cleveland Browns.
- Allison Cahill: Quarterback, Boston Renegades (2003, 2005–present). First quarterback in history to amass 100 career victories playing exclusively in women's football leagues.
- Sami Grisafe: Quarterback, Chicago Force (2007–present). 2013 WFA National Champion and game MVP. Two-time gold medalist for Team USA in the 2010 and 2013 IFAF Women's World Championships. Musician and songwriter.
- Anita Marks: Quarterback, Miami Fury (2000–2002), Florida Stingrays (2003). Television and radio sports reporter/commentator.
- Yekaterina Pashkevich: Running back, New Hampshire Freedom (2002–2006) and Boston Rampage (2007). A charter member of Russia's first women's national hockey team. Olympian for Russian Federation women's hockey team (2002, 2006, 2014).
- Natalie Randolph: Wide receiver, DC Divas (2004–2008). Became third ever female head coach a boys' high school football team in 2010. Recipient of the Women of Distinction Award from the American Association of University Women in 2011.
- Phoebe Schecter: Defensive linebacker and captain of the Great Britain team. In 2015, Schecter led the GB team to the European Championship final against Finland. In 2017, she made headlines as a coaching intern with the Buffalo Bills in the NFL.
- Sarah Schkeeper: Offensive guard, New York Sharks, Richmond Black Widows (2009–present). Gold medalist for Team USA 2013 IFAF Women's World Championship. Founder of Richmond Black Widows football club.
- Katie Sowers: Eight-year player in the Women's Football Alliance and gold medalist for Team USA at the 2013 IFAF Women's World Championship. Later became the second female coach in NFL history, and the first to coach in a Super Bowl.
- Lei'D Tapa: Linebacker, Carolina Queens (2007–2009). Professional wrestler and model.
- Donna Wilkinson: Running back/tight end, D.C. Divas (2001–present), Los Angeles Amazons (2000). In 2003, became first woman in modern era to rush for over 1,000 yards in an eight-game regular season. Two-time gold medalist for Team USA (2010, 2013).
- Alissa Wykes: Running back, Philadelphia Liberty Belles. NWFA MVP in 2001. Came out as a lesbian in December/January 2002 edition of Sports Illustrated for Women, making her one of the first active American athletes to publicly come out as gay.
- Whitney Zelee: Running back, Boston Militia/Renegades (2011–present). In 2013, eclipsed the 2,000-yard benchmark and set a new record of 2,128 rushing yards over an eight-game season, earning her conference MVP honors. Holds WFA record for most touchdowns in one game (8 vs D.C. Divas on May 18, 2013). Two-time WFA National Champion and game MVP (2011, 2014).

== College players ==
Almost all of the women who have played on predominantly male college and professional football teams have done so by playing either the placekicker or holder positions. Both positions are rarely involved in the full contact present in American football.

=== Placekickers ===
- Liz Heaston – First woman to play and score in a college football game, kicking two extra points on October 18, 1997, as a placekicker with the Willamette Bearcats in the NAIA. A star soccer player, Heaston had been recruited as a replacement for the injured starting kicker, and had trained with the team for three weeks; she played in only one other football game for Willamette.
- Ashley Martin – Second female athlete to score in a college football game, and the first to score in an NCAA Division I game on August 30, 2001, as a placekicker for Jacksonville State University. She kicked three extra points in a game against Cumberland University; JSU was then in Division I-AA, which later became known as FCS.
- Katie Hnida – First woman to score in an NCAA Division I-A football game on August 30, 2003, as a placekicker for the University of New Mexico, kicking two points against Texas State University. Also the first woman to appear in a bowl game, at the 2002 Las Vegas Bowl against UCLA, during which her extra point attempt was blocked. (See also "Players in predominantly male football leagues" above.)
- Tonya Butler – First woman to score a field goal in an NCAA game on September 27, 2003, while playing for the University of West Alabama Tigers in Division II as a graduate student. By 2004, Butler had scored 87 career points, setting an NCAA record for a female kicker.
- Brittany Ryan – Scored 100 career points as placekicker for Lebanon Valley College of NCAA Division III in 2010, breaking Tonya Butler's record for most career points scored by a female player in the NCAA.
- Sarah Fuller – First woman to play in a Power Five football game on November 28, 2020, after taking the opening kickoff of the second half for the Vanderbilt Commodores football team who were playing Missouri. Fuller was a starting goalkeeper on the Vanderbilt women's soccer team, who had won the SEC Championship title the previous weekend; she tried out for the men's football team on the Monday before the game, because they were short of specialists due to COVID-19 testing, and needed a kicker. On December 12, 2020, Fuller became the first woman to score a point in a Power Five football game, after kicking an extra point in a Vanderbilt game against Tennessee.
- April Goss: Former college football placekicker at Kent State University.
- KaLena "Beanie" Barnes: A sprinter on the University of Nebraska–Lincoln track team, punted in the 2000 spring intra-squad scrimmage for the Huskers.
- Leilani Armenta: Placekicker for the Jackson State Tigers. First woman to score in an HBCU game, scoring three extra points in an October 29, 2023 game against Arkansas Pine-Bluff.
- Madison Barch: First woman to score non-kicking points in college football at any level (NCAA, NAIA, etc.), caught a two-point conversion in an NCAA Division III game at Trine University on November 11, 2023. A placekicker for the Kalamazoo College Hornets, Barch finished her career making 35-of-41 extra point attempts.

=== Other positions ===
- Taylor Crout – The first female player to play a non-kicking position in an NCAA game at any level, for the D3 Fitchburg State Falcons on September 9, 2023. Two weeks later, Haley Van Voorhis also appeared in a non-kicking position, for the D3 Shenandoah Hornets.
- Lily Godwin – First female player in NCAA history to record a solo tackle, as a LB for the University of Puget Sound Loggers, a D3 school.
- Sam Gordon – Running back, Salt Lake City. Her play in a youth football league led to her becoming the first female football player featured on a Wheaties box.
- Toni Harris – First woman to be offered a full college football scholarship, playing in a full-contact skill position. By the end of her community college career as free safety for East Los Angeles Community College, Harris had received scholarship offers from six universities, and finally signed with Central Methodist University, an NAIA school. Harris was also the first female football player in a television ad aired during the Super Bowl, appearing in a commercial for Toyota during Super Bowl LIII in February 2019. In February 2020, Harris appeared in an "NFL 100" commercial at the opening of Super Bowl LIV.
- Reina Iizuka – First woman to appear on a U Sports (Canadian) football roster; DB/LB for the University of Manitoba.
- Sofia Jonasson – First European female to play for an American college.
- Shelby Osborne – Became the first female player to play a non-kicking position at a four-year college after signing in summer 2014 to play cornerback at Campbellsville University, an NAIA school.

== High school players ==
=== Pre-2000 ===
- Luverne "Toad" Wise – First female player to score in an American football game, as a kicker for the Atmore (now Escambia County) Alabama High School Blue Devils in 1939; also played in 1940.
- Frankie Groves – The first female to play on a boys' high school varsity team in the state of Texas, she played right tackle for Stinnett High School in 1947.
- Theresa Dion – First female player on a boys' high school varsity team in the state of Florida, when she played as a placekicker for Immaculate High School in Key West, Florida, in 1972. Dion has been referred to as the first female player on a boys' high school varsity team (in any sport).
- Tami Maida – First known quarterback to also a become homecoming princess, as a 14-year-old junior varsity quarterback at Philomath High School in Philomath, Oregon, in 1981. Her story was the basis of the CBS movie Quarterback Princess starring Helen Hunt as Maida. She is Canadian.
- Beth Bates – First female player in Kentucky to score in a high school football game, kicking five extra points for the Williamsburg Yellow Jackets during her junior year in 1982. Her historic first extra point was covered in The New York Times and Sports Illustrated. She became the first female player to score a field goal in Kentucky during her senior year, when she connected on a 22-yarder.
- Heather Darrow – First female athlete in the state of Tennessee to score a point in a high school football game, when she kicked a PAT in the season opener as a junior at Notre Dame High in 1986.
- Kathleen Trumbo – First female in the state of Indiana to earn a varsity letter in football, as a defensive tackle at Corydon Central High School in 1989. Although other girls in Indiana had started the season on boys' football teams, only Trumbo is believed to have finished.
- Sabrina Wells – One of the first two female players in the WPIAL (Western Pennsylvania Interscholastic Athletic League), who played as a tight end for Ballou High School in Washington, DC, in 1989. Featured in Jet magazine with Lakeal Ellis.
- Lakeal Ellis – One of the first two female players in the WPIAL (Western Pennsylvania Interscholastic Athletic League), who played as a defensive back for Roosevelt High School in Washington, DC, in 1989. Featured in Jet magazine with Sabrina Wells.
- Teri James - The first girl to score any points, and the first girl to score a touchdown, in Nebraska high school football, which she did in 1991.
- Jessica Schultz – First female in Tennessee to score a touchdown in a varsity football game, as a sophomore running back at Jellico High in 1998. The touchdown on the home field of border rival Williamsburg High in Kentucky was viewed as "revenge" for the widely publicized extra point scored by Beth Bates 16 years prior.
- Tonya Fletcher – One of the very few female players in the state of Illinois to have tried and succeeded in playing high school football as of 1998, along with Tina Brooks of Wauconda High. Fletcher was a kicker for Cary Grove High School, who was named homecoming queen in 1998, and was featured in Mary-Kate and Ashley Magazine in 2001.

=== Post-2000 ===
- Holley Mangold – In 2007, she played high school football as an offensive linewoman. She played at Archbishop Alter High School on the offensive line and was the first girl to start in an Ohio High School State Championship football game. She is the younger sister of NFL offensive lineman Nick Mangold. She also competed as a weightlifter in the 2012 Summer Olympics.
- Mika Makekau: In 2008, as a placekicker for Iolani School in Honolulu, Hawaii, Makekau set the state record for longest field goal (44 yards) by a female kicker. Later became a college football placekicker at the University of La Verne, making a 26-yard field goal against No. 11 Whitworth on September 7, 2019.
- Erin DiMeglio – In 2012, became the first female quarterback to see play in Florida high school football history.
- Sophie Cunningham – Briefly served as a kicker for Rock Bridge High School in 2014, scoring two field goals on four attempts. Cunningham, a multi-sport athlete, later became a professional basketball player in the WNBA.
- Anna Zerilli – Started kicking for Manchester-Essex High School, MA in 2015 and was the starting Varsity kicker for them. First female football player in North Shore and Cape Ann History and first female freshman to score in a Varsity game in American history. Currently playing Varsity football at Proctor Academy in New Hampshire. First New England female to sign to play college football. And will be kicking at Lake Forest College in Illinois next fall. Kicker at Lake Forest College. First female to play on male football team in school history. Became first to play in the conference and first female to play college football in the Midwest.
- Becca Longo – Kicker who in 2017 became the first woman to earn a college football scholarship to an NCAA school at the Division II level or higher and signed a letter of intent with Adams State University.
- Abby DiCenzo – Middle linebacker of Bell Creek Academy who in 2021 became the first girl in any Florida high school to score a rushing touchdown in a varsity game.
- Sofia LaSpina – Wide receiver of Wellington C. Mepham High School who in 2021 became the first female varsity high school football player on Long Island to score a touchdown.
- Breanna Bernardson – Elk River High School kicker who in 2022 became the first female football player to score in a Minnesota state championship football game; she scored three extra points.
- Lara Saslow - Palo Alto High School, California. Lara played all four years of high school, earning the starting role as extra point kicker her Sophomore year on the JV team, and remained starter on Varsity her Junior and Senior year. She had 62 points throughout her career, performed in a kickoff in the last playoff game her Junior year, and also had one pass attempt on a botched PAT her Senior year. She is also active in Women's Flag Football and plans to play at Tulane University. She ranked as high as #7 out of over 100 kickers in the Central Coast Section in her Junior year. Lara won the "Coaches Award" her Senior year.

== See also ==
- List of female American football teams
- Women's American football
