= 2001 Cumberland vs. Jacksonville State football game =

- First female athlete to play and score in NCAA
Cumberland Phoenix	Jacksonville State Gamecocks
(0–0)	(0–0)
10	72
Head coach: Herschel Moore	Head coach: Jack Crowe
	1	2	3	4	Total
Cumberland	3	0	7	0	10
Jacksonville State	21	10	7	34	72
- Date: August 30, 2001
- Season: 2001
- Stadium: Burgess-Snow Stadium
- Location: Jacksonville, Alabama
- Attendance: 11,312

The 2001 Cumberland vs. Jacksonville State football game was a college football game between the Cumberland Bulldogs and the Jacksonville State Gamecocks played on August 30, 2001. The game was played at Burgess-Snow Stadium in Jacksonville, Alabama. Jacksonville State won the game by a score of 72 to 10. During the game, Ashley Martin became the first woman to play and score in an NCAA football game and the second woman to play and score in a college game in any division.

== Game play ==
Jacksonville State led the game beginning with Lorenzo Banks receiving a 33-yard pass from Reggie Stancil for a touchdown. Steven Lee kicked the first extra point to put the score 7–0. Martin would kick two more extra points in the first quarter alone and the first quarter ended with a score of 21–3. Jacksonville led the remainder of the game.

The game ended in a final score of Jacksonville State 72, Cumberland 10.

== Aftermath ==
Prior to this game, female athletes at Duke and Louisville had come close to playing in a game but did not. In 1997, Liz Heaston became the first female athlete to score in a college football game. In 2003, Katie Hnida became the first female athlete to score in a Division I-A bowl game.

Martin's success as a female athlete is considered a major milestone since the 1972 Title IX amendment of the Civil Rights Act of 1964 in the United States.

== See also ==
- List of historically significant college football games
- Women's American football
