= McCulloch Stadium =

Stadium in Salem, Oregon, US

Charles McCulloch Stadium
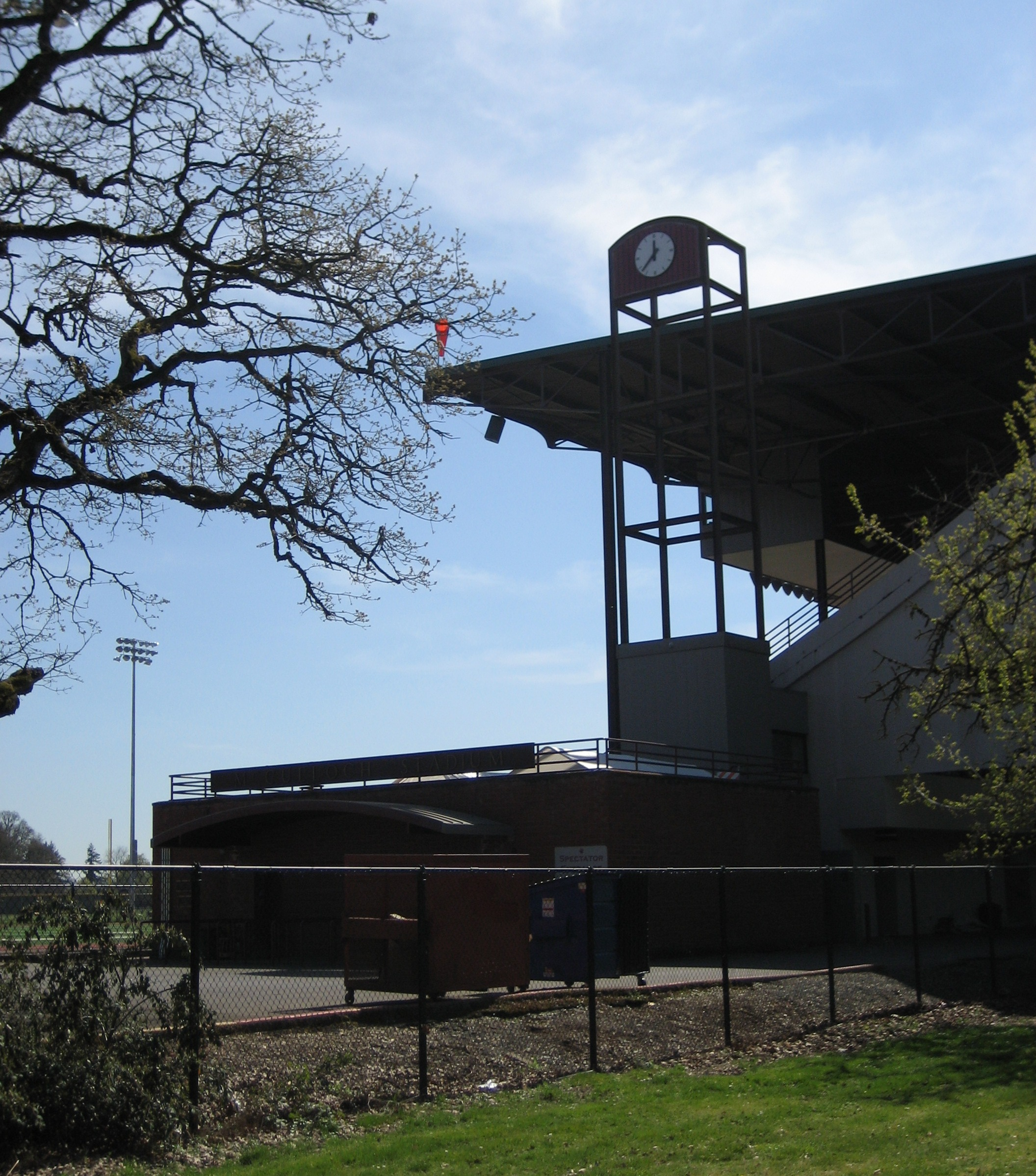

- Location in the United States Location in Oregon
- Interactive map of Charles McCulloch Stadium
- Address: 890 Mission Street SE
- Location: Salem, Oregon, U.S.
- Coordinates: 44.9298°N 123.0376°W
- Owner: Willamette University
- Operator: Willamette University
- Capacity: 2,500
- Surface: FieldTurf

Construction
- Opened: 1950; 76 years ago
- Renovated: 1993

Tenants
- Willamette University (NCAA); Portland Timbers U23s (USL2) (2017–)

McCulloch Stadium is a 2,500-seat outdoor stadium in the Northwestern United States, located in Salem, Oregon. Built 76 years ago in 1950, the multi-use facility serves as home to Willamette University's football and track & field teams, and high school football games. Located in Bush's Pasture Park south of Willamette's campus, the stadium includes a grandstand, football field, and track.

== History ==
Charles E. McCulloch donated $50,000 to the school in June 1947 in order to build an athletic complex on 10 acres (4.0 ha) at what is now Bush's Pasture Park. At the time, McCulloch was president of the university's board of trustees and an attorney in Portland where he was a partner at what is now Stoel Rives. The proposed stadium was to have seating for 3,500 in a concrete grandstand, plus a baseball diamond, track, and practice field for the football team. Construction began in March 1950 with it planned to be completed in time for that year's football season. It was also announced the stadium would be named for Charles E. McCulloch and have a total capacity of 7,000.

On October 14, 1950, a dedication ceremony was held with school president G. Herbert Smith and Oregon governor Douglas McKay on hand to welcome Hawaii and honor the 1941 Willamette team that was stranded in Hawaii after the attack on Pearl Harbor. The New York Giants football team held their first scrimmage of the 1958 season at the stadium on July 31. Around 1970 the track surface was converted to an asphalt and rubber surface, which was resurfaced in the 1980s.

McCulloch Stadium went through a major renovation in 1993. After renovations, the field was named Ted Ogdahl Field in honor of the former coach while the locker rooms were dedicated in the honor of Jeff Knox. In October 1997, Liz Heaston became the first female to play in a college football game, kicking two extra points in the game at McCulloch against Linfield College.

A new $300,000 rekotan track surface was installed at the stadium in 2000. At that time university officials discovered the previous track was 6 meters (20 ft) too long. In 2003 the grass field was removed and a new FieldTurf surface was installed at a cost of $500,000. Later that year lights were re-installed at McCulloch at a cost of $110,000. A new video scoreboard was added at the facility in 2007.

== Sports ==
The stadium hosts a variety of sports. These include lacrosse, football, soccer, and track meets. McCulloch can seat 2,500 spectators. All seats at the stadium are in the covered grandstand on the west side of the playing surface. The grandstands include a press box, offices for the coaches, player locker rooms, and athletic training facilities.

McCulloch includes the eight lane Charles Bowles Track for the school's track teams. Next door is Spec Keene Stadium where the school's baseball team plays. The stadium also host high school football games, including OSAA playoff games.
