= Haley Van Voorhis =

American football player (born 2003)

No. 10
- Position: Safety

Personal information
- Born: 2003 (age 22–23); The Plains, Virginia, U.S.
- Listed height: 5 ft 6 in (1.68 m)
- Listed weight: 150 lb (68 kg)

Career information
- High school: Christchurch
- College: Shenandoah (2021–2024)

Haley Van Voorhis (born 2003 or 2004) is an American former college football player for Shenandoah University. She is one of the first women to play a position other than kicker in an NCAA football game, at any level. She accomplished this as a safety for the Shenandoah University Hornets on September 23, 2023.

== Early life ==
Van Voorhis grew up in The Plains, Virginia. She attended Christchurch School near Urbanna, Virginia where she was a member of the football, basketball, and lacrosse teams. She was 2019 All-State Honorable Mention in Virginia, playing wide receiver and defensive back. Her senior season at Christchurch was canceled due to the COVID-19 pandemic, Van Voorhis' coach reported she would have been a team captain and starting receiver that year.

== College career ==
Before starting college, Van Voorhis played strong safety in the Pro division of the Women's Football Alliance for the D.C. Divas in Washington D.C., recording 21 tackles in five games. On Saturday, September 23, 2023, she entered the game in the first quarter for the Shenandoah Hornets against the Juniata Eagles and recorded a quarterback hurry. During her senior season in 2024, Van Voorhis played in two games, recording a tackle in each game and logging a near-interception pass breakup in Shenandoah's 41–14 win over Averett University.

== See also ==
- Tonya Butler, the first woman to score a field goal in an NCAA game
- Sarah Fuller, the first woman to score in a Power Five conferences football game
- Liz Heaston, the first woman to score in a college football game, done in the NAIA
- Katie Hnida, the first woman to score in an NCAA Division I Football Bowl Subdivision football game and the first woman to dress for a bowl game.
- Ashley Martin, the first woman to score in an NCAA game, and the first to score in a Division I game
- List of female American football players
