= Tonya Butler =

American athlete (born 1980)

No. 37
- Position: Kicker

Personal information
- Born: October 20, 1980 (age 46); Atlanta, Georgia, U.S.
- Listed height: 5 ft 5 in (1.65 m)
- Listed weight: 140 lb (64 kg)

Career information
- High school: Riverdale High School
- College: Middle Georgia (2000–2001); West Alabama (2003–2004)

Awards and highlights
- First female athlete to score a field goal in a college football game

Tonya Lynn Butler (born October 20, 1980) is an American athlete who is the first woman ever to score a field goal in a college football game. She accomplished this feat on September 13, 2003, as a placekicker for the University of West Alabama Tigers, who were competing in the National Collegiate Athletic Association (NCAA) Division II.

== Playing career ==
=== High school ===
Butler was raised in Fayetteville, Georgia, where she played the placekicker position for Riverdale High School. She won the starting kicking job when she was in tenth grade after serving as the junior varsity kicker for her freshman year. As a sophomore, Butler converted seven of eight field goal attempts and 28 of 31 extra points and became the first female to both make the all-area team for Clayton and Henry Counties and honorable mention for Class AAA all-state team as picked by the Georgia Sportswriters Association.

Butler converted five of ten field goal attempts and 20 of 23 extra points as a junior; and seven of thirteen field goals and 64-of-65 extra points as a senior. She completed her Riverdale career with 165 total points, for second place all-time in points scored at Riverdale. For her performance on the field, Butler was also named to the 1998 Class AAA all-state football team as picked by the Georgia Sportswriters Association as the first female ever selected. She also lettered in soccer in high school.

=== College ===
During her senior year of high school, Butler received interest from Central Michigan in Division I-A and over two dozen schools in Division I-AA for her services as placekicker. In January 1999 Butler announced she would play college football at Middle Georgia College for head coach Randy Pippin and signed a national letter of intent for a football scholarship to compete as placekicker on February 3, 1999. The signing made Butler the first female to earn a football scholarship at a state school. During her two years at Middle Georgia, Butler made 36 of 42 extra points and one field goal for the Warriors. After earning her associates degree at Middle Georgia, she did not receive any scholarship offers to compete as a placekicker elsewhere. Butler ended up going to Georgia Southern where she graduated in 2003.

After graduating from Georgia Southern, former Georgia College head coach Randy Pippin, who was now the head coach at West Alabama, offered Butler a scholarship to serve as placekicker for the Tigers. With two years of eligibility remaining, she enrolled as a graduate student and won the starting placekicker position for the Tigers 2003 season. In the first game of the season, Butler scored on a 27-yard field goal attempt against Stillman with 9:41 remaining in the first quarter. Although initially unconfirmed by the NCAA as gender was not differentiated in their all-time records, it was later confirmed that Butler was the first female player to score a field goal in an NCAA college football game.

Butler served as placekicker for both the 2003 and 2004 seasons playing for West Alabama. For her career she made 13 of 19 field goal attempts with a long kick of 39 yards, and 48 of 53 in extra point attempts. Her 50 total points made during the 2003 season led the squad, and she was named special teams captain in both her years at West Alabama. Butler also was named Academic All-Gulf South Conference in 2004 and graduated in 2005 with a master's degree in psychology and counseling. In January 2006, her West Alabama helmet, jersey and cleats were displayed at the NCAA Hall of Champions in Indianapolis in recognition of her accomplishments as a student-athlete.

Butler held the record for the most points scored by a female college football player with 87 through the 2010 season when Brittany Ryan from Lebanon Valley College established the new mark.

== See also ==
- List of female American football players
- Sarah Fuller, the first woman to score in a Power Five conferences football game
- Liz Heaston, first female to play and score in a college football game
- Katie Hnida, the first woman to score in a FBS game
- Becca Longo, first woman to receive an NCAA football scholarship to a Division II or better school
- Haley Van Voorhis, the first female to play a non-kicking position in an NCAA game at any level
