= Randy Pippin =

American football player and coach

Current position
- Title: Senior analyst
- Team: Jacksonville State
- Conference: C-USA

Biographical details
- Born: Dallas, Texas, U.S.

Playing career
- 1981–1982: Cisco
- 1983–1984: Tennessee Tech
- Position: Running back

Coaching career (HC unless noted)
- 1985–1987: Tennessee Tech (GA)
- 1988–1989: Middle Tennessee (DE)
- 1990–1992: Trinity Valley (DC)
- 1993–1995: Trinity Valley
- 1996–1997: Tennessee Tech (OC)
- 1998–2000: Middle Georgia
- 2001–2003: West Alabama
- 2005–2007: Northwest Mississippi
- 2008–2010: Classical Academy (CO) (interim HC)
- 2011–2012: East Texas Baptist (DC)
- 2012–2014: East Central (DC)
- 2015–2022: UAB (DPR)
- 2023–present: Jacksonville State (sr. analyst)

Head coaching record
- Overall: 8–25 (college); 61–31–2 (junior college)
- Bowls: 4–0 (junior college)

Accomplishments and honors

Championships
- 1 NJCAA National (1994); 1 TJCFC (1994)

Randy Pippin is an American college football coach and former player. He is a senior analyst at Jacksonville State University in Jacksonville, Alabama, a position he has held since 2023. Pippin has served as head football coach at Trinity Valley Community College in Athens, Texas, from 1993 to 1995, Middle Georgia College, from 1998 to 2000, the University of West Alabama, from 2001 to 2003, and Northwest Mississippi Community College, from 2005 to 2007. He led his 1994 Trinity Valley valley team to an NJCAA National Football Championship.

== Early life and playing career ==
Pippin grew up in Texas and attended Cisco College before transferring to Tennessee Technological University, where he played college football as a running back from 1983 to 1984.

== Coaching career ==
Pippin started his coaching career as a graduate assistant on the defense at Tennessee Technological University, from 1985 to 1987. From Tech, Pippin served as linebackers coach at Middle Tennessee State University, from 1988 to 1989, and as defensive coordinator at Trinity Valley Community College, from 1990 to 1992.

From 1993 to 1995, Pippin had his first head coaching job at Trinity Valley after being promoted from defensive coordinator. In 1994, he was named the NJCAA National Coach of the Year and led the Cardinals to the NJCAA National Football Championship, defeating Northeastern Oklahoma A&M College in the Tyler Shrine Bowl.

After serving as offensive coordinator at Tennessee Tech for two seasons, Pippin took the position of head coach and athletic director at Middle Georgia College. At Middle Georgia, he led the Warriors to an overall record 24–10 and a victory in the 1998 Mineral Water Bowl. Pippin was also noted for having Tonya Butler sign a national letter of intent to attend Middle Georgia on a football scholarship for a placekicker. At the time of her signing, Butler was the first female to earn a football scholarship in Georgia.

Following the 2000 season, Pippin resigned from Middle Georgia and took the head coaching position at the University of West Alabama. At West Alabama, he led Tigers to an overall record of 8–25 during his three-year tenure, but won give games in his second season including victories over Delta State, West Georgia and North Alabama, a feat that has not been done before in program history. On September 13, 2003, when Tonya Butler, who Pipping has previously signed at Middle Georgia, became the first female in National Collegiate Athletic Association (NCAA) history to kick a field goal in a regulation game. The goal was scored on a 27-yard attempt against Stillman with 9:41 remaining in the first quarter.

After leaving West Alabama, Pippin spent a year as a dean, athletic director, and head football at Cottage Hill Christian Academy in Mobile, Alabama, before he was hired as head football coach at Northwest Mississippi Community College. During his three-year stint with the Rangers, his teams participated in postseason championship games his second and third years. His second-year team won the North Division with a perfect 6–0 record. From there he served as head coach at The Classical Academy in Colorado Springs, Colorado, while directing the Glazier Football Coaching Clinics nationally. He then became the defensive coordinator at East Texas Baptist University for the 2011 and 2012 seasons while taking on the Texas and Oklahoma Nike Coach of the Year Clinics. He then moved to East Central University, where as defensive coordinator he orchestrated the best rushing defense in school history. East Central participated in a postseason bowl game for the first time in more than 20 years. Pippin then joined Bill Clark at the University of Alabama at Birmingham (UAB) serving in various coaching, recruiting, and administrative roles as the UAB Blazers football program was brought back from a hiatus following the 2014 season.

Pippin has authored two books C.H.A.O.S., a defensive football instructional manual, and Deep in the Heart, about the history of football in Southern United States and the return of the UAB football program after a hiatus in 2015 and 2016.

== Head coaching record ==
=== College ===
| Year | Team | Overall | Conference | Standing | Bowl/playoffs |
|---|---|---|---|---|---|
West Alabama Tigers (Gulf South Conference) (2001–2003)
| 2001 | West Alabama | 1–10 | 0–9 | 12th | |
| 2002 | West Alabama | 5–6 | 3–6 | T–8th | |
| 2003 | West Alabama | 2–9 | 1–8 | 12th | |
| West Alabama: | | 8–25 | 4–23 | | |
| Total: | | 8–25 | | | |

=== Junior college ===
| Year | Team | Overall | Conference | Standing | Bowl/playoffs |
|---|---|---|---|---|---|
Trinity Valley Cardinals (Texas Junior College Football Conference) (1993–1995)
| 1993 | Trinity Valley | 8–1–2 | 4–1–1 | 3rd | W Real Dairy Bowl |
| 1994 | Trinity Valley | 12–0 | 6–0 | 1st | W Tyler Shrine Bowl |
| 1995 | Trinity Valley | 5–5 | 3–3 | T–3rd | L TJCFC semifinal |
| Trinity Valley: | | 24–7–2 | 13–4–1 | | |
Middle Georgia Warriors (Georgia Collegiate Athletic Association) (1998–2000)
| 1998 | Middle Georgia | 9–3 | | | W Mineral Water Bowl |
| 1999 | Middle Georgia | 5–6 | | | |
| 2000 | Middle Georgia | 10–1 | | | W Golden Isles Bowl |
| Middle Georgia: | | 24–10 | | | |
Northwest Mississippi Rangers (Mississippi Association of Community and Junior Colleges) (2005–2007)
| 2005 | Northwest Mississippi | 1–6 | 1–5 | | |
| 2006 | Northwest Mississippi | 6–4 | 6–0 | | |
| 2007 | Northwest Mississippi | 6–4 | 5–1 | | |
| Northwest Mississippi: | | 13–14 | 12–6 | | |
| Total: | | 61–31–2 | | | |
National championship Conference title Conference division title or championship game berth
