= April Goss =

American football player (born 1993)

No. 91
- Position: Kicker

Personal information
- Born: September 2, 1993 (age 33)

Career information
- College: Kent State (2012–2015)

April Goss (born September 2, 1993) is an American former football placekicker for the Kent State Golden Flashes football team. She played for the Golden Flashes from 2012 to 2015 and was redshirted in 2012. She wore uniform number 91. On September 12, 2015, Goss became the second female player to score in an official Football Bowl Subdivision (FBS, formerly Division I-A) game.

With 4:30 left in the second quarter of Kent State's game against the Delaware State Hornets, Goss came on in place of starting placekicker Shane Hynes to attempt the extra point following a 5-yard touchdown run by Kent State quarterback George Bollas. Her kick veered right, but flew inside the right upright and over the crossbar. The only previous woman to score in a FBS football game was New Mexico's Katie Hnida, who recorded two extra points in a 2003 game against Texas State.

Goss was in her fourth year for Kent State's football team, earning the praise of KSU coach Paul Haynes, who insisted she had earned her opportunity: "She works her tail off. She's the first one out there in practice and the last one off the field." Kent State went on to win the game 45–13.
