= Elizabeth Wilkinson =

18th century English martial artist

Elizabeth Wilkinson (fl. 1722–1733; alternatively referred to as Elizabeth Stokes) was an English bare-knuckle boxer and practitioner of historical European weapon arts active in the 1720s and early 1730s. She was one of the earliest known female boxers. During her decade-long career, she was often described as a "Championess" and had a reputation for having fought 45 bouts without defeat, although no official career data survives from the time. Later in her career, she engaged in bouts in which she and her husband, who was also a boxer, fought against other mixed-gender couples. She was also skilled with daggers, short swords, and quarterstaffs. She was one of the most famous prizefighters of her time, and writers including Pierce Egan and Thomas Moore celebrated her career into the early 19th century.

== Personal life ==
Little information survives about Wilkinson's life outside the boxing ring. In an announcement promoting one of her matches, she claimed to be "of the famous city of London". Like most English boxers of the early 18th century, she appears to have come from a working class English background. L.A. Jennings speculated that she may have been related to the boxer Robert Wilkinson, who was hanged for murder on 24 September 1722, shortly after Elizabeth's first advertised boxing match, while Christopher Thrasher speculated that "Wilkinson" might not have been her real surname and that she may have chosen it as a stage name to evoke the particularly infamous fellow boxer.

Wilkinson married the boxer James Stokes. A 1725 promotional announcement for a fight describes her as his "much admired consort". Sometime between 1722 and 1726, she became known as Elizabeth Stokes.

After her last documented fights in 1733, no further information about her life can be found in the historical record.

== Boxing career ==
In June 1722, Wilkinson challenged Hannah Hyfield of Newgate Market to what may have been one of the earliest advertised female prizefights in London. Her challenge in a London newspaper declared "I, Elizabeth Wilkinson, of Clerkenwell, having had some words with Hannah Hyfield and requiring Satisfaction, do invite her to meet me on the Stage, and Box with me for three guineas". They went on to specify that each woman would grasp a half crown in each hand, a rule that prevented the gouging and scratching common in eighteenth-century boxing. That year, she also fought a fishwife named Martha Jones, whom she reportedly beat after twenty-two minutes.

In the 18th century, boxing matches were always bare knuckle, and bouts sometimes continued without pause until one competitor collapsed. Wilkinson was also skilled with daggers, short swords, and quarterstaffs, and the majority of her matches may have been fought with weapons. At the time it was common for women to fight topless, so Thrasher suggests that Wilkinson and her opponents defined themselves as serious athletes by fighting fully clothed, with one advertisement from 1726 stating that the boxers would "fight in cloth Jackets, short Petticoats, coming just below the Knee, Holland Drawers, white Stockings, and pumps".

Wilkinson became a fixture in the boxing venues of James Figg. Both Figg and Wilkinson were skilled self-promoters, and Wilkinson frequently engaged in trash-talk in her printed challenges. For example, in a published acceptance of a challenge from Ann Field, an ass-driver from Stoke Newington, Wilkinson declared that "the blows which I shall present her with will be more difficult for her to digest than any she ever gave her asses". By 1726, Wilkinson also frequently fought at James Stokes' boxing amphitheatre.

While British newspapers of the 1720s announced bouts, they did not report on the results, so no definitive record of Wilkinson's wins and losses exists. Based on fight announcements, however, she appears to have been undefeated for most of her career. In October 1726, a London newspaper announced a fight between Wilkinson and Mary Welch, an Irish boxer, to take place at James Stokes' amphitheatre. In the newspaper announcement, Welch described Wilkinson as "the famous Championess of England", and in her response, Wilkinson claimed to be undefeated, "having never engaged with any of my own Sex but I always came off with Victory and Applause". In advertisements for other fights, she was variously billed as the "Invincible City Championess", the "European Championess", the "Cockney Championess", and "Britania's most puissant Heroine".

Later in her career, Wilkinson and her husband were often challenged as a pair by other mixed-gender couples, with her fighting the woman and him, the man. In the first of these, her former opponent Mary Welch and her trainer Robert Baker challenged "Mr. Stokes and his bold Amazonian Virago" in July 1727. Thomas and Sarah Barret gave a similar challenge in December 1728. In his response, James Stokes noted that Elizabeth was "thought not to fight in Publick anymore" but "my spouse not doubting but to do the fame and hopes to give a general Satisfaction to all Spectators". Though she exclusively boxed against other women, one advertisement from 1733 suggests that she may have fought a fencing match against Edward Sutton, who was also a frequent combatant in London's prize rings.

In addition to fighting, Wilkinson instructed aspiring pugilists. An announcement for one of Wilkinson's fights noted that two of her students would fight six rounds with quarterstaffs interspersed among the bouts between Wilkinson and her opponent.

Wilkinson continued to appear in boxing announcements until at least 1733, by which point she claimed to have fought 45 matches and gone undefeated. She disappeared from the historical record after her last advertised fight.

== Legacy ==
According to Malissa Smith, women's boxing went against middle and upper class attitudes during Wilkinson's career. According to Jennings, Wilkinson's career appears to have been successful even though she defied 18th century gender roles. She was celebrated as a skilled boxer into the early 1800s, earning praise from sportswriter Pierce Egan in his 1813 book Boxiana. Early 19th century writers James Peller Malcolm and Thomas Moore also referenced Wilkinson in a positive light.

Thrasher has found that references to Wilkinson became increasingly rare and negative later in the 19th century. He argues that the Victorian era saw a strict redefinition of gender roles, so some writers of that time portrayed Wilkinson as an historical curiosity, while others derided her and her contemporaries as evidencing the barbarism and moral failings of the 18th century.

== See also ==
- Timeline of women's sports
