= Patricia Palinkas =

American football player

No. 3
- Position: Holder

Personal information
- Born: 1943; Chicago, Illinois, U.S.
- Died: 21 June 2025 (aged 81–82)
- Listed height: 5 ft 8 in (1.73 m)
- Listed weight: 122–130 lb (55–59 kg)

Career information
- College: Northern Illinois University

Career history
- Orlando Panthers (1970)

Patricia Palinkas (née Barczi, 1943–2025) was the first woman to have played American football professionally in a predominantly male league. She was a holder for her husband Stephen Palinkas for the Orlando Panthers of the minor league Atlantic Coast Football League. She was the only woman professional American football player until Katie Hnida signed with the Fort Wayne Firehawks in 2010.

== Life and career ==
Palinkas was born Patric Barczi in Chicago, Illinois, to parents of Hungarian descent. Palinkas attended Northern Illinois University, but did not play football there. Upon graduating, she taught brats at U.S. military bases in Japan and Germany before meeting her eventual husband and moving to Florida with him.

At the time of Mr. and Mrs. Palinkas's signing with Orlando, the team was in severe financial straits, having lost thousands of dollars running the team on a large budget. The incoming ownership group sought a way to draw fans to the gate without the big-budget talent it had relied upon in the 1960s. The publicity that came with a female football player, and the profits that could be realized by hiring a box-office draw at league minimum salary, was likely a key factor in the duo's signing.

Palinkas's first day of play was August 15, 1970, against the Bridgeport Jets, in front of roughly twelve thousand fans. On her first play, Palinkas was attacked by Jets defenseman Wally Florence, who admittedly (and unsuccessfully) attempted to "break her neck" as punishment for what he perceived to be "making folly with a man's game." In response, Palinkas turned to her husband (who had also been roughed on the same play) and said nonchalantly, "Are you ready, honey?" She blamed the uncharacteristic behavior on being under the influence of a tranquilizer (which she normally did not use) she had taken before the game to calm her nerves. Palinkas went on to appear four more times: three consecutive successful extra-point kicks, and a field goal attempt that was blocked.

After her husband injured his leg (reducing his field goal range from 40 yards to an unacceptable 25 yards) and failed to make the preseason cut, Palinkas (after surviving a threat from ACFL Commissioner Cosmo Iacavazzi to block her contract and prevent her from playing) remained the team's holder for a new kicker, Ron Miller, mainly because she was a draw at the box office; she lost interest in playing the game soon after the decision and was suspended shortly after the start of the season.

After being placed on the Panthers' taxi squad, Palinkas left the team, in part due to the low pay; she received $25 for each of the two preseason games in which she appeared, and was planning on demanding a greater share than the standard $100 ACFL salary had she played in any regular-season games. Palinkas was one of several Panthers players who quit the team prior to the end of the season because of salary disputes, and several of her teammates complained of not being paid at all. She held an option to return to the team in 1971 (which transferred to the Roanoke Buckskins after the Panthers suspended operations) but, because of the relocation distance and other problems she experienced during her time playing football, she let it lapse.

Palinkas, after her brief stint in professional football, returned to her home in Tampa, Florida, to start a family and continue her career as a first grade teacher, a career that would span over 40 years. She remained a football fan after her playing career, supporting the establishment of the Tampa Bay Buccaneers. In 2018, she indicated plans to donate her uniform to the Pro Football Hall of Fame. She spent her last years in Clearwater, Florida, where she had been living with the family of one of her daughters after Stephen's death; she died June 21, 2025.

== Documentary ==
In 2026, Ashley Brandon released a 12-minute documentary film, Panther Pat, highlighting Palinkas's achievements. The film won awards at several film festivals.

== See also ==
- List of female gridiron football players
- List of women's firsts
