= Becca Longo =

American football player (born 1999)

Personal information
- Born: March 17, 1999 (age 27); Chandler, Arizona, U.S.
- Listed height: 5 ft 11 in (1.80 m)
- Listed weight: 140 lb (64 kg)

Career information
- High school: Basha High School (Chandler)
- College: Adams State (2017–2018); Gila River Hawks (2019)

Rebecca Longo (born March 17, 1999) is an American football kicker who became the first woman to earn a college football scholarship to an NCAA school at the Division II level or higher when she signed a letter of intent with Adams State University. She attended Basha High School in Chandler, Arizona and started playing football competitively her sophomore year. In 2014, she was a junior varsity kicker at Queen Creek High in Arizona, but after transferring to Basha High she was forced to sit out her junior year.

In her final year of high school, she converted 35 extra points on 38 attempts and was successful on her lone field goal attempt of the season of 30 yards. She did not handle kickoff duties. She was listed as 5 foot 11 inches tall and 140 pounds.

After a redshirt year, and an ankle injury during the 2018 season, Longo left Adams State without attempting a kick or playing a down in a game. She announced via her social media that she wished to "pursue other opportunities", presumably at other universities.

In September 2019, Longo announced that she had joined the Gila River Hawks of the newly formed Hohokam Junior College Athletic Conference. The 4-team conference, consisting of players from a local junior college, disbanded after one season.

== See also ==
- List of female American football players
