= Roughing the kicker =

Penalty in gridiron football

In gridiron football, roughing the kicker is an action in which a defender, having missed an attempt to block a kick, tackles the kicker or otherwise runs into the kicker in a way that might injure the kicker. This protection is also extended to the holder of a place kick. It is a separate penalty from "running into the kicker."

== National Football League ==
In the NFL, a defensive player commits a "roughing the kicker" foul if he (a) contacts the plant leg of the kicker while his kicking leg is still in the air; or (b) slides into or contacts the kicker when both of the kicker’s feet are on the ground. It is not a foul if the contact is not severe, or if the kicker returns both feet to the ground prior to the contact and falls over a defender who is on the ground.

The penalty for such a violation in most leagues is 15 yards and an automatic first down. When such a violation occurs, the team about to surrender possession via a punt will retain its possession as a result. If the violation occurs when a successful field goal is kicked, the yardage is assessed on the ensuing kickoff, unless the offended team elects to accept the penalty and continue its drive in hopes of scoring a touchdown, which is referred to "taking the points off the board".

Such protections are also extended to the holder during field goal kicks; the penalty for roughing the holder is identical.

== History ==
In 1914, the term "roughing the kicker" came into use. Previously, it was known as "running into the fullback after the kick."

In 1917, penalties for roughing the kicker were measured from the spot where the ball was put out of play.
