= Skill position =

Position category in gridiron football

Skill position is a gridiron football term that covers offensive positions that handle the ball and are primarily responsible for advancing yards and scoring points. Offensive players such as quarterbacks, running backs, and wide receivers are typically considered skill positions, as are tight ends.

The running backs, wide receivers, and tight ends on a team are often referred to as offensive weapons or simply weapons for a quarterback on the offensive side of the ball. Sportswriters often use the term interchangeably with "skill position" to describe non-quarterback and non-offensive linemen on a team's offense.

Skill positions are contrasted with linemen and defensive players, which are generally considered to be positions heavily reliant on power and brute strength. Skill position players are often physically smaller than linemen, but they must also be faster and have other talents; such as the ability to throw accurately, handle or catch the ball under pressure, avoid tacklers, or read and exploit defensive weaknesses; which are less of a priority for linemen.

== See also ==
- Eligible receiver
