= 1997 Linfield vs. Willamette football game =

1997 Linfield vs. Willamette
- First female athlete to play and score
Linfield Wildcats	Willamette Bearcats
(2–2)	(5–0)
0	27
Head coach: Jay Locey	Head coach: Dan Hawkins
	1	2	3	4	Total
Linfield	0	0	0	0	0
Willamette	7	7	3	10	27
- Date: October 18, 1997
- Season: 1997
- Stadium: McCulloch Stadium
- Location: Salem, Oregon
- Attendance: 3,600

The 1997 Linfield vs. Willamette football game was a college football game between the Linfield Wildcats and the Willamette Bearcats played on October 18, 1997. The game was played at McCulloch Stadium in Salem, Oregon. Willamette won the game by a score of 27 to 0. During the game, Liz Heaston became the first woman to play and score in a college football game.

== Game play ==
Willamette's Rich Rideout ran a 5-yard touchdown in the first quarter, but it was in the second quarter after Ardell Bailey scored on a 2-yard carry that Heaston took the field and kicked her first of two extra points with 57 seconds left in the first half.

The only points in the third quarter were from Gordo Thompson's field goal, but in the fourth quarter quarterback Chuck Pinkerton completed a nine-yard pass to Kyle Carlson for a touchdown. Heaston kicked her second extra point in the fourth quarter, and the final score was 27–0.

== Aftermath ==
Willamette finished the regular season undefeated and advanced to the 1997 NAIA National Championship, losing to Findlay. The next year, Willamette left the NAIA to join the NCAA Division III, along with the rest of the members schools of the Northwest Conference at that time.

Prior to this game, female athletes at Duke and Louisville had come close to playing in a game but did not. In 2001, Ashley Martin became the second female athlete to score in a college football game, this time in the NCAA. In 2003, Katie Hnida became the first female athlete to score in a Division I-A bowl game.

== See also ==
- 1997 NAIA football season
- List of historically significant college football games
- Women's American football
