= Ashley Martin =

American athlete

No. 89
- Position: Kicker

Personal information
- Born: c. 1981 (age 44–45)
- Listed height: 5 ft 11 in (1.80 m)
- Listed weight: 160 lb (73 kg)

Career information
- High school: Sharpsburg (GA) East Coweta
- College: Jacksonville State (2001)

Ashley Martin (born c. 1981) is an American athlete who became the first woman to play and score in an NCAA Division I American football game, and one of the first ever to score points in any college football game. She accomplished this feat August 30, 2001, as a placekicker for the Jacksonville State University Gamecocks, where she also played on the women's soccer team. Martin played at Division I-AA (now known as the Football Championship Subdivision). The only earlier female player to score in a college football game was Liz Heaston, who kicked for Willamette University, a National Association of Intercollegiate Athletics (NAIA) school, in 1997.

== Life ==
Martin had previously served as placekicker on the East Coweta High School football team in Sharpsburg, Georgia. She was voted homecoming queen at her high school, and accepted her crown while wearing her football uniform. After high school, she enrolled at Jacksonville State University, where she played for the Jacksonville State Gamecocks women's soccer team.

In 2001, she joined the Jacksonville State football team as a backup placekicker. She became the first woman to play and score points on August 30, 2001, when she kicked an extra point in the first quarter of a game against Cumberland University. She would go on to make two more successful extra point attempts in the game, which resulted in a 72–10 Jacksonville State victory.

As of 2003, Martin was one of four female players to have scored points in college football. Liz Heaston had previously kicked two extra points for NAIA Willamette University on October 18, 1997, in a game against Linfield College. Katie Hnida later scored two points for the University of New Mexico on August 30, 2003, to become the first female to play and score in an NCAA Division I-A (now known as Football Bowl Subdivision) football game, college football's highest level. In 2020, Sarah Fuller was the first woman to play and score in a power-five game, scoring two extra points for Vanderbilt against Tennessee in a 42–17 loss.

== See also ==
- List of female American football players
- 2001 Cumberland vs. Jacksonville State football game
