= Liz Heaston =

American athlete (born 1977)

No. 39
- Position: Placekicker

Personal information
- Born: 1977 (age 48–49); Richland (WA)
- Listed height: 5 ft 5 in (1.65 m)
- Listed weight: 120 lb (54 kg)

Career information
- High school: Richland
- College: Willamette (1997–1999)

Awards and highlights
- First woman to play and score in college football

Elizabeth Heaston Thompson (born 1977) is an American athlete who is the first woman ever to score in a college football game. She accomplished this feat on October 18, 1997 as a placekicker for the Willamette Bearcats football team of Willamette University, which then competed in the National Association of Intercollegiate Athletics (NAIA) for small colleges. She also played women's soccer for Willamette as a defender. Heaston's accomplishment was widely noted by the media and the sports community.

== Life ==
Heaston was raised in Richland, Washington. After graduating she enrolled at Willamette University, where she became a star soccer player, earning All-American honorable mention in 1996 and 1997. In 1997 she joined the football team as a backup placekicker. She became the first woman to play and score points in a college football game during a matchup between Willamette and Linfield College on October 18, 1997. The 5-foot-5-inch, 120-pound soccer player entered the game as a replacement kicker for Willamette and kicked two extra points as her team won 27-0. The accomplishment resulted in interviews with The Today Show and CBS This Morning.

Heaston's football career lasted two games; she made two of four extra point attempts. Her jersey hangs on display at the College Football Hall of Fame.

The following year Heaston played only soccer at Willamette, and graduated with a biology degree in 1999. She attended graduate school at Pacific University where she earned a doctorate in optometry and met her husband Trent Thompson. She has one daughter, Isabella, and a son and lives and works in her hometown of Richland, Washington, where she works at her father's optometry office along with her husband.

== See also ==
- 1997 Linfield vs. Willamette football game
- Tonya Butler, the first female to score a field goal in an NCAA game
- Sarah Fuller, the first woman to score in a Power Five conferences football game
- Katie Hnida, the first woman to score in a Division I-A game
- Ashley Martin, the first female to score in an NCAA game, and the first to score in a Division I game
- Haley Van Voorhis, the first female to play a non-kicking position in an NCAA game at any level
- List of female American football players
