= Katie Hnida =

American football player (born 1981)

Katharine Hnida

Profile
- Position: Placekicker

Personal information
- Born: May 17, 1981 (age 45)
- Listed height: 5 ft 10 in (1.78 m)
- Listed weight: 138 lb (63 kg)

Career information
- High school: Chatfield (Littleton, Colorado)
- College: Colorado (1999); New Mexico (2002–2004)

Awards and highlights
- First woman to score in an NCAA Division I FBS football game

Katharine Anne Hnida (/ˈnaɪdə/; born May 17, 1981) is an American former football player who became the first woman to score in an NCAA Division I-A game, college football's highest level. She accomplished this as placekicker for the University of New Mexico Lobos on August 30, 2003.

Hnida is the third woman to have scored in a college football game, after Liz Heaston, who played for NAIA Willamette University in 1997, and Ashley Martin, who played for NCAA Division I-AA Jacksonville State University in 2001. While at University of Colorado Boulder in 1999 she became the second woman to dress for a Division I-A game, and the first to do so for a bowl game.

== Early life ==
Hnida grew up in Littleton, Colorado. She attended Chatfield Senior High School near Littleton, where she was a member of the football team. She went 3 for 3 in field goal attempts, and 27 for 28 in extra point attempts in her senior year. She was a member of the varsity team and named one of America's "20 most influential teens" by Teen People magazine. Rick Reilly wrote a "Life of Reilly" column about her.

== College career ==
After high school, Hnida enrolled at the University of Colorado Boulder. Due to her success in high school football, she was invited to join the Colorado Buffaloes football team as a walk-on freshman placekicker by then coach Rick Neuheisel. Neuheisel left Colorado in 1998, but his replacement Gary Barnett kept the walk-on offer open. Hnida never saw playing time at Colorado, though she did suit up for games, becoming the second woman to do so in Division I football, and the first to do so in a bowl game, when Colorado went to the 1999 Insight.com Bowl. In 2000, after falling ill with mononucleosis and tonsillitis, Hnida was unable to compete for a roster spot.

Hnida left Colorado in 2001 and eventually transferred to the University of New Mexico the following year. There she made the New Mexico Lobos football team as a walk-on placekicker. While at New Mexico, she became the first woman to play in a Division I-A bowl game when she played in the 2002 Las Vegas Bowl against UCLA, where her extra point attempt was blocked. On August 30, 2003, she became the first woman to score in a Division I-A game when she kicked two extra points against Texas State University in the fourth quarter of a 72–8 New Mexico win. She graduated in December 2004.

In February 2004, Hnida told Sports Illustrated writer Rick Reilly that she had been raped by one of her teammates at Colorado in 2000, and sexually harassed on other occasions. She was one of several women who reported being assaulted by members or recruits of the Colorado football team during this time. Colorado coach Gary Barnett denied Hnida's allegation in a statement, during which he also criticized Hnida's abilities as a player. The school subsequently suspended Barnett for his comments.

== Post-playing life ==
Hnida travels around the country to share her athletic story and her journey as a victim of sexual assault. She commonly speaks at colleges and universities to educate and raise awareness about assault. Katie has worked with many organizations that help victims of assault, including The Joyful Heart Foundation and the Voices and Faces Project. She resides in Los Angeles where she manages her speaking engagements and book tour.

Hnida's father, Dave, is a physician and the medical reporter for the CBS affiliate in Denver. He is also the author of "Paradise General: Riding the Surge at a Combat Hospital in Iraq."

In 2006, Hnida wrote a book about her experiences, titled Still Kicking: My Journey as the First Woman to Play Division One College Football. It details abuse and sexual assault she experienced while at Colorado, as well as her experiences afterward at the University of New Mexico.

In 2010, Hnida became the kicker for the Fort Wayne FireHawks in the Continental Indoor Football League. The league's first female player, and only the second female professional football player in history (after placeholder Patricia Palinkas), Hnida played in the first three games of the team's season but was released later that year after developing a blood clot in her kicking leg.

In 2018, Hnida became gravely ill after an adverse reaction to a prescribed antibiotic sent her into multiple organ failure; her family reported her kidneys and liver failed and her bone marrow quit functioning, resulting in admission to an intensive care unit and emergency dialysis.

== See also ==
- Tonya Butler, the first female to score a field goal in an NCAA game
- Sarah Fuller, the first woman to score in a Power Five conferences football game
- Liz Heaston, the first woman to score in a college football game, done in the NAIA
- Ashley Martin, the first female to score in an NCAA game, and the first to score in a Division I game
- Haley Van Voorhis, the first female to play a non-kicking position in an NCAA game at any level
- List of female American football players
