= 1949 Edmonton Eskimos season =

Canadian football team season

- General manager: Al Anderson
- Head coach: Annis Stukus
- Home stadium: Clarke Stadium

Results
- Record: 4–10
- Division place: 3rd, WIFU
- Playoffs: Did not qualify

The 1949 Edmonton Eskimos season was the first season in the current franchise's history after several other Edmonton teams played under the same moniker but were unrelated. The team finished in 3rd place in the WIFU with a 4–10 record and missed the playoffs.

== Team formation ==
On December 13, 1948, a group of Edmonton businessmen, led by Bob Bradburn, met and formed board of directors for a revived Edmonton Eskimos football team. The club's inaugural directors included Lucien Maynard, Bud Marquardt, and Walter Mackenzie. On January 23, 1949, the Eskimos were admitted into the Western Interprovincial Football Union after the city's decade long absence from the league. Toronto sportswriter and former Argonaut back Annis Stukus was named head coach the following month. He was chosen over Cincinnati Bearcats football coach Ray Nolting due to his knowledge of the Canadian game.

Stukus brought his brother Bill to serve as the team's first quarterback and rounded out the backfield with U.S. imports Chuck Fenenbock, Pat West, and Earl Elsey. When the University of Alberta shut down its football program, Stukus added three more backs (Harry Irving, Peter Lougheed, and Harry Hobbs). Linemen included Andy Marefos, Bill Radovich, Lou Mogul, Nate Shore, Ken Moore, Gene Kiniski, Steve Paproski, John Dlugos, Nick Albert, and Jack Baldwin and Dimitri Goloubef, Jim MacRae, Bruce Pirt, Don Loucks, and Harry Bunting were the team's ends.

== Regular season ==
=== Standings ===
Western Interprovincial Football Union
Team	GP	W	L	T	PF	PA	Pts
Calgary Stampeders	14	13	1	0	270	77	26
Regina Roughriders	14	9	5	0	235	102	18
Edmonton Eskimos	14	4	10	0	93	235	8
Winnipeg Blue Bombers	14	2	12	0	74	258	4

=== Schedule ===
Week	Game	Date	Opponent	Results		Venue	Attendance
Week	Game	Date	Opponent	Score	Record	Venue	Attendance
1	1	Mon, Sept 5	Calgary Stampeders	L 6–20	0–1	Clarke Stadium	11,123
2	2	Sat, Sept 10	Winnipeg Blue Bombers	W 14–11	1–1	Clarke Stadium	6,500
2	3	Mon, Sept 12	Regina Roughriders	L 0–12	1–2	Clarke Stadium	6,000
3	4	Sat, Sept 17	at Regina Roughriders	L 1–13	1–3	Taylor Field	4,000
3	5	Mon, Sept 19	at Winnipeg Blue Bombers	W 10–3	2–3	Osborne Stadium	4,000
4	6	Sat, Sept 24	at Calgary Stampeders	L 5–41	2–4	Mewata Stadium	9,000
5	7	Sat, Oct 1	Calgary Stampeders	L 8–12	2–5	Clarke Stadium	10,000
6	8	Sat, Oct 8	at Winnipeg Blue Bombers	L 6–8	2–6	Osborne Stadium	4,000
6	9	Mon, Oct 10	at Regina Roughriders	W 12–11	3–6	Taylor Field	3,000
7	10	Sat, Oct 15	at Calgary Stampeders	L 6–31	3–7	Mewata Stadium	8,000
8	11	Sat, Oct 22	Winnipeg Blue Bombers	W 13–6	4–7	Clarke Stadium	7,000
8	12	Mon, Oct 24	Regina Roughriders	L 11–29	4–8	Clarke Stadium	5,000
9	13	Sat, Oct 29	at Calgary Stampeders	L 0–27	4–9	Mewata Stadium	6,700
9	14	Mon, Oct 31	Calgary Stampeders	L 1–11	4–10	Clarke Stadium	
