= Sport in Winnipeg =

Sport in Canadian city

Winnipeg has been home to several professional hockey, football and baseball franchises. There have also been numerous university and amateur athletes.

== Hockey ==
Winnipeg has a storied hockey history and has been home to several top amateur and professional hockey clubs.

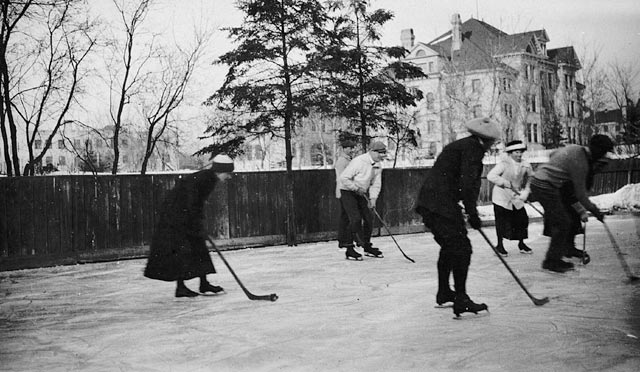
An ice hockey game, 1919, Winnipeg

The Winnipeg Victorias were three-time Stanley Cup champions (1896, 1901 and 1902). Prior to the founding of national hockey program, three Winnipeg-based clubs won gold medals representing Canada: the Winnipeg Falcons at the 1920 Winter Olympics in Antwerp, Belgium, the Winnipeg Hockey Club at the 1932 Winter Olympics in Lake Placid, New York, and the Winnipeg Monarchs at the 1935 World Ice Hockey Championships Winnipeg teams dominated the early years of the Allan Cup, Canada's senior amateur championship. Between 1909 and 1918, when the Allan Cup was decided through challenges, the Winnipeg Victorias, the Winnipeg Hockey Club, the Winnipeg Monarchs, and the Winnipeg 61st Battalion each won at least one championship. The Winnipeg Maroons participated in the Western Canada playdowns for the Allan Cup 12 times between 1953 and 1967, advancing to the national finals twice, with a loss at the 1961 Allan Cup and winning its only national championship at the 1964 Allan Cup.

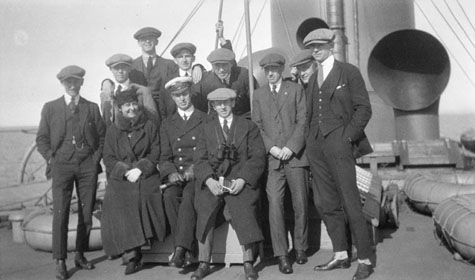
Picture of the Gold Medal-winning Winnipeg Falcons taken en route to the 1920 Olympics (photo includes an unidentified ship's officer and a woman)

Memorial Cup champion teams from Winnipeg include the Winnipeg Junior Falcons (1921), Elmwood Millionaires (1931), Winnipeg Monarchs (1935, 1937, 1946), Winnipeg Rangers (1941, 1943), St. Boniface Seals (1938), and Winnipeg Braves (1959).

The old Winnipeg Arena, built in 1955, was originally home to the Winnipeg Warriors of the Western Hockey League (minor professional) from 1955 to 1961. The Warriors were World's Minor Professional Champions in 1955-56, winning the Edinburgh Cup. The arena was also home to the Winnipeg Warriors of the WHL from 1980 through 1984, and the Winnipeg Monarchs of the same league from 1967 to 1974.

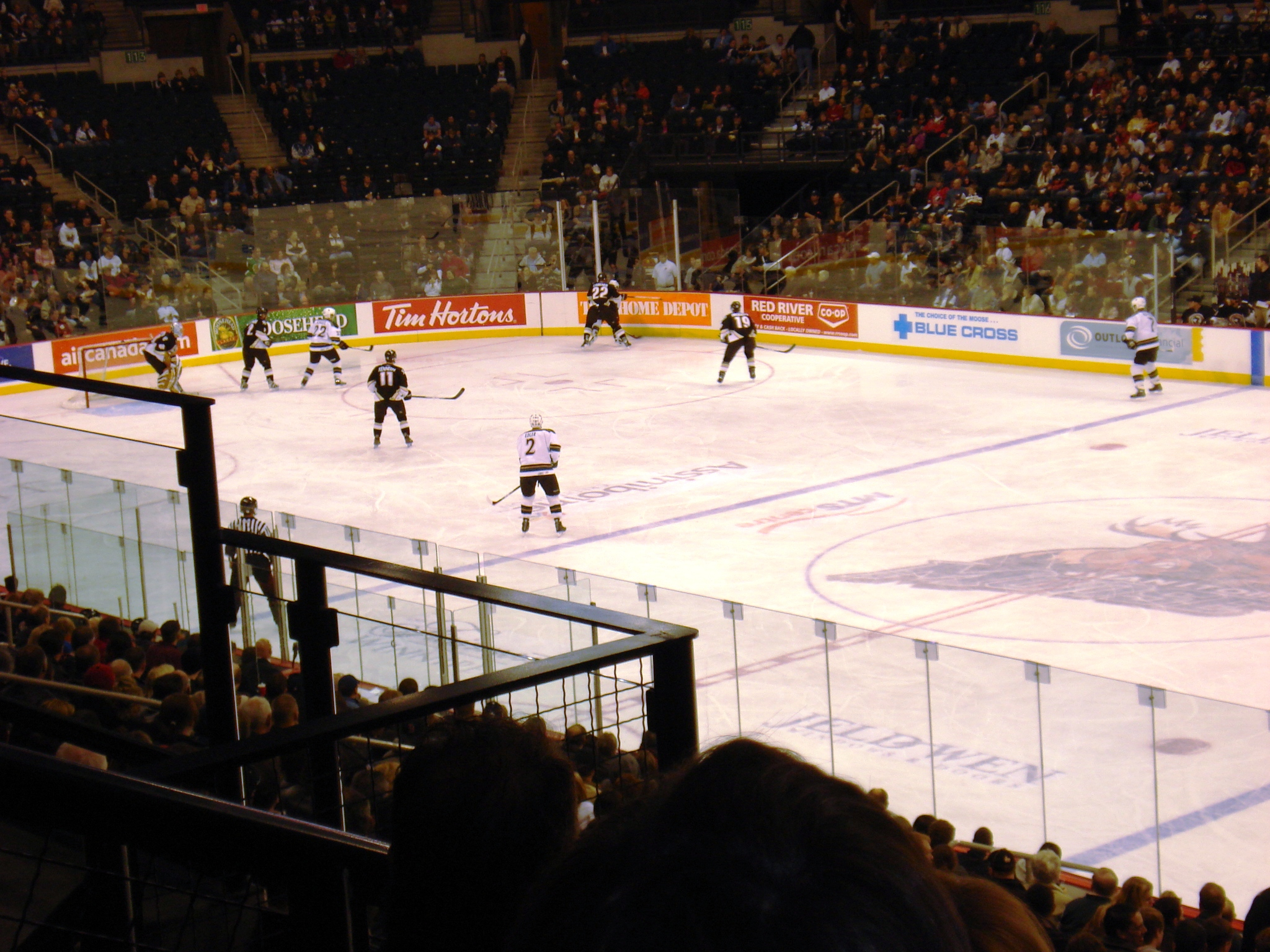
A Manitoba Moose game at the MTS Centre.

The Winnipeg Jets were founded in 1972 as one of the original teams of the World Hockey Association and went on to win three Avco Cups in eight years. After the WHA folded in 1979, the Jets entered the National Hockey League. The Jets featured such Hall of Famers as WHA coach Rudy Pilous and players Bobby Hull, Dale Hawerchuk, and (briefly) Serge Savard, as well as other popular players such as Teemu Selänne and Phil Housley. Jets fans were known for creating the Winnipeg White Out, a tradition in which fans dressed in all-white for playoff games. In 1996, the team was sold to an ownership group based in Phoenix, Arizona, and were relocated, becoming the Phoenix Coyotes.

From 1996 to 2011, Winnipeg was home to the Manitoba Moose. The Moose played in the now-defunct International Hockey League, before joining the American Hockey League in 2001. The Moose were the top minor league affiliate to the NHL's Vancouver Canucks. In 2004, the Moose moved from the Winnipeg Arena to the new MTS Centre (since renamed Canada Life Centre). They returned to the city in 2015 as the AHL affiliate of the Winnipeg Jets.

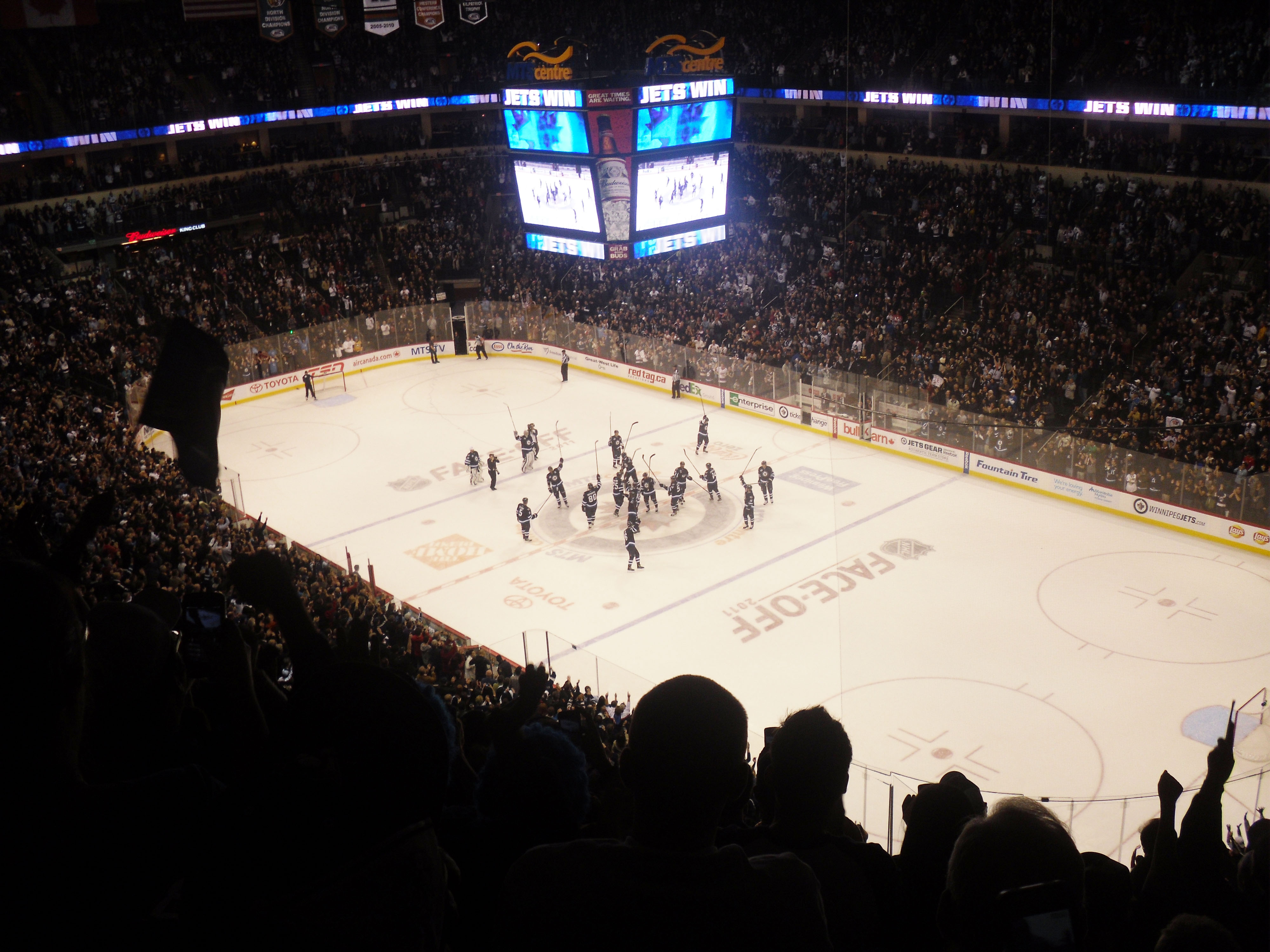
The "Jets 2.0" celebrate their first home win since returning to Winnipeg at the MTS Centre (now Canada Life Centre).

In 2011, True North Sports & Entertainment, owners of the Moose and MTS Centre, purchased the NHL's Atlanta Thrashers, and relocated the team to Winnipeg, they were subsequently renamed the Winnipeg Jets. The team plays home games at the Canada Life Centre. The "Jets 2.0" have enjoyed moderate success since moving back to Winnipeg, making the playoffs eight times in their first 11 seasons back in Winnipeg. The Jets won the Presidents' Trophy as the team with the most points in the 2024–25 NHL regular season.

Current Winnipeg-based amateur teams of note are the University of Manitoba Bisons, Winnipeg Blues (Manitoba Junior Hockey League) and Winnipeg Freeze (Manitoba Junior Hockey League). Hockey Winnipeg, the local branch of Hockey Manitoba oversees minor hockey in the city. The city briefly had a Western Hockey League franchise from 2019-2023 known as the Winnipeg Ice.

Major international hockey events played in Winnipeg include Game 3 of the 1972 Summit Series, various Canada Cup games, and the 1999 World Junior Ice Hockey Championships.

Winnipeg has produced Hall of Fame hockey players Andy Bathgate, Bill Mosienko, Art Coulter, Ching Johnson, Frank Fredrickson, Jack Ruttan and Terry Sawchuk. Beyond that, 183 major league professional hockey players were born in Winnipeg.

== Football ==
Winnipeg has a team in the Canadian Football League, the Blue Bombers, who have won 12 Grey Cups, the league's championship trophy. The Winnipeg 'Pegs won the Grey Cup in 1935. Winnipeg also hosted the Grey Cup game in 1991, 1998, 2006, 2015 and 2025.

Team	League(s)	Years Operated	Championships
Winnipeg Blue Bombers	CFL	1930–present	12
Winnipeg Rifles	CJFL	2002–present	0
Winnipeg Hawkeyes	MJFL, CJFL	1920–1998	0
Winnipeg Rods	MJFL, CJFL	1920–1994	5
Manitoba Fearless	WWCFL	2008–present	0
Winnipeg Wolfpack	WWCFL	2011–present	0

== Baseball ==
Team	Years Operated	Championships
Winnipeg Goldeyes	1994–present	4
Winnipeg Maroons	1902–1942	8
Winnipeg Goldeyes	1953–1964	3
Winnipeg Whips	1970–1971	0

Minor-league baseball has a long history in Winnipeg.

1902–1942: Winnipeg Maroons of the original Northern League

1953–1964: Winnipeg Goldeyes, an affiliate of the St. Louis Cardinals in the Class C Northern League

1970–1971: Winnipeg Whips, AAA affiliate of the Montreal Expos

In 1994, the Rochester Aces of the independent Northern League re-located to Winnipeg, and the team was renamed the Goldeyes.

Initially, the team played at multi-purpose Winnipeg Stadium. In 1999, the team moved to the downtown CanWest Global Park, a baseball-only stadium. The Goldeyes are owned by former mayor Sam Katz.

== Basketball ==
The Winnipeg Thunder played from 1992-1994. Their inaugural season was in the World Basketball League. After the WBL folded the Thunder joined the National Basketball League (Canada) until 1994 when the league folded. From 1995-2001 the Winnipeg Cyclone played in the International Basketball Association. In 2022, the Canadian Elite Basketball League awarded Winnipeg an expansion franchise to begin play for the 2023 season. The team was named the Winnipeg Sea Bears. In their first season the Sea Bears drew the highest attendance in the CEBL and were the first team in the Western Conference to clinch a playoff spot.

Teams	Leagues	Years operated	Championships
Winnipeg Thunder	World Basketball League National Basketball League	1992–1994	0
Winnipeg Cyclone	IBA	1995–2001	0
Winnipeg Sea Bears	CEBL	2022–Present	1 (2026)

== Soccer ==
Winnipeg was once home to the Winnipeg Fury professional soccer team, playing in the Canadian Soccer League and winning the final championship to be hosted in the league.

Team	League(s)	Years Operated	Championships
Winnipeg Ember FC	NSL	2026–present	0
FC Manitoba	PPL	2011–present	0
Valour FC	CPL	2018–2025	0
Winnipeg Fury	CSL	1987–1992	1

On May 4, 2015, Investors Group Field in Winnipeg was named as one of six venues to host the 2015 FIFA Women's World Cup.

On May 6, 2017, Winnipeg was announced as one of the cities that would be home to a team in the newly founded Canadian Premier League. Valour FC competed in the CPL starting in 2019. The club played its games at Princess Auto Stadium, and was owned by the Winnipeg Football Club, the non-profit group that owns the Blue Bombers. Starting in the 2024 season, Valour was off the books of Winnipeg Football Club, and the league took on the operating costs of the club. After the 2025 CPL season, it was announced that Valour FC would suspend operations, becoming the second team to fold since the league's inaugural season in 2019.

== Golf ==
Winnipeg routinely host the Manitoba Open, a professional tournament on the PGA Tour Americas. Several notable courses exist in the city including St. Charles Country Club, Niakwa Country Club, St. Boniface Golf Club and more.

== Horse racing ==
The first track horse race in Winnipeg took place in 1922. Whittier Park and Polo Park were used as racetracks in the past. Today, Assiniboia Downs is a six and one half furlong oval located on the western edge of the city. It is operated as a non-profit organization by the Manitoba Jockey Club. Live thoroughbred horse racing takes place in the summer.

== Amateur sports ==
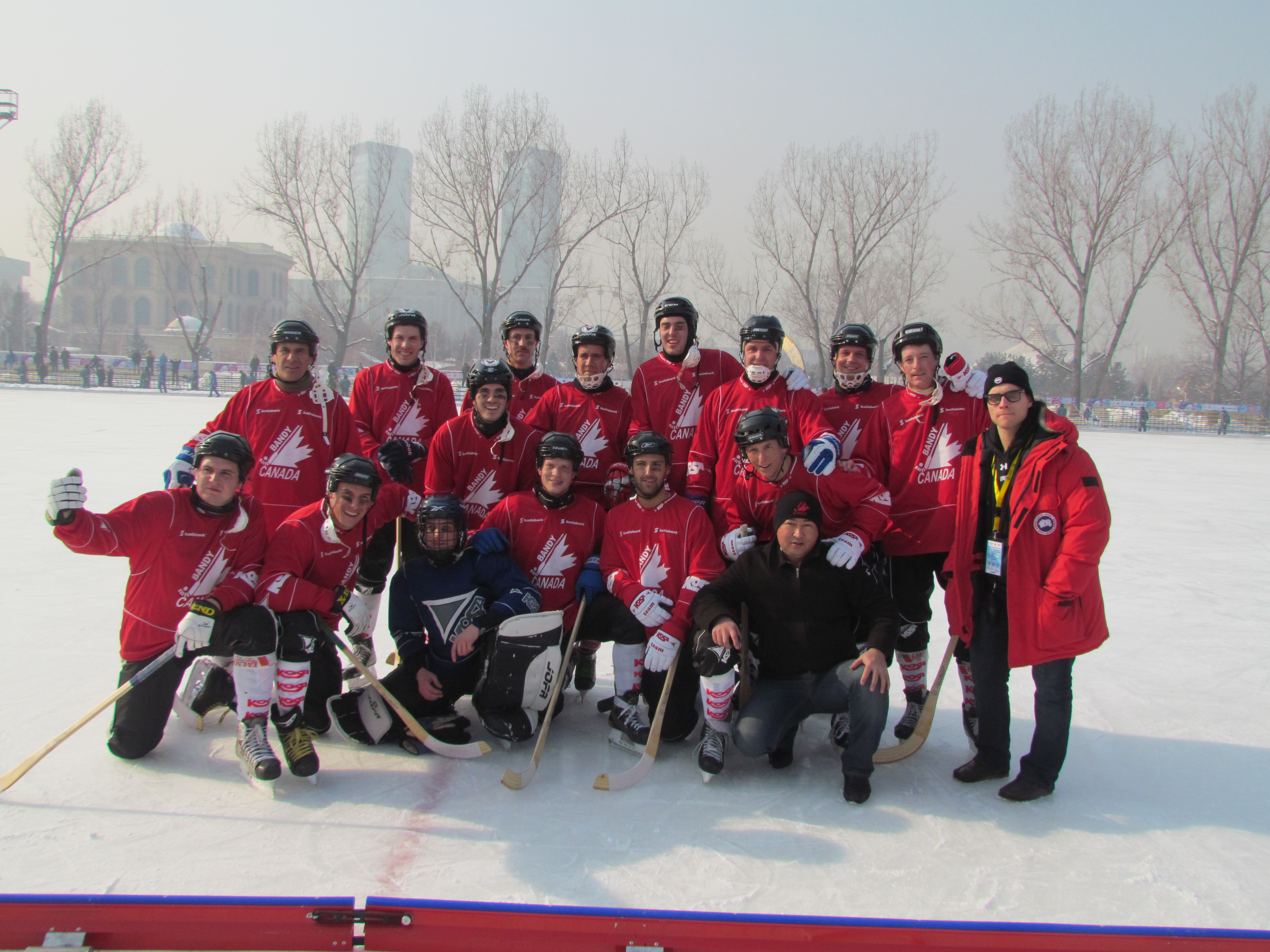
The Winnipeg-based Canada national bandy team at the 2012 Bandy World Championship in Almaty

Winnipeg hosted the 1967 Pan American Games and 1999 Pan American Games. In 1991, the city hosted the fifth Western Canada Summer Games. It also hosted the 2023 World Police and Fire Games. In aquatics, the city hosted the 1991 World Aquatics Diving World Cup and the 1999 FINA Women's Water Polo World Cup.

Some of the notable sports figures from Winnipeg include six time Olympic speedskating medallist and most decorated Canadian Olympian Cindy Klassen, Olympic Taekwondo athlete and bronze-medallist Dominique Bosshart, Summer and Winter Olympic medal winner Clara Hughes and Canadian Olympic Women's Hockey Gold medallist Jennifer Botterill.

Daniel Yanofsky, the first chess Grandmaster developed in the British Commonwealth, lived in Winnipeg from infancy, and he organized and played in Canada's first Supergrandmaster chess tournament in Winnipeg 1967.

The Winnipeg area is the only place in Canada where bandy is played.

Winnipeg has had several competitive Dodgeball players represent Canada in the WDBF (World Dodgeball Federation) World Championships. Winnipeg's first player to make Team Canada was Guylaine San Filippo who won Silver in 2016 and made the team again 2017 where they placed fourth. Winnipeg's next player to make team Canada was Julie McLaren in 2019 but the Women's team did not win a medal that year. World Championships were not held during 2020 and 2021 due to the Covid-19 Pandemic. For the 2022 World Championships, in addition to the standard Men's and Women's divisions, the WDBF introduced Mixed (male & female) divisions for both the Foam and Cloth styles of play, and Winnipeg saw significantly more representation. Catie Brady won Gold with the Women's Foam team. The Mixed Foam team won gold with significant representation from Winnipeg: Coach Amanda Furst, team Captains Jaycie Morris and Jesse Copet, along with teammates Tayler Yuel, Nick Grenier, Eldon Wu and Rylan Yarjau. Jaycie Morris was awarded MVP for the Mixed Foam division. Colton Bertrand (mixed cloth) and Kahleigh Krochak (women's cloth) also represented Winnipeg at the World Championships in 2022 but did not place.

== Skateboarding ==
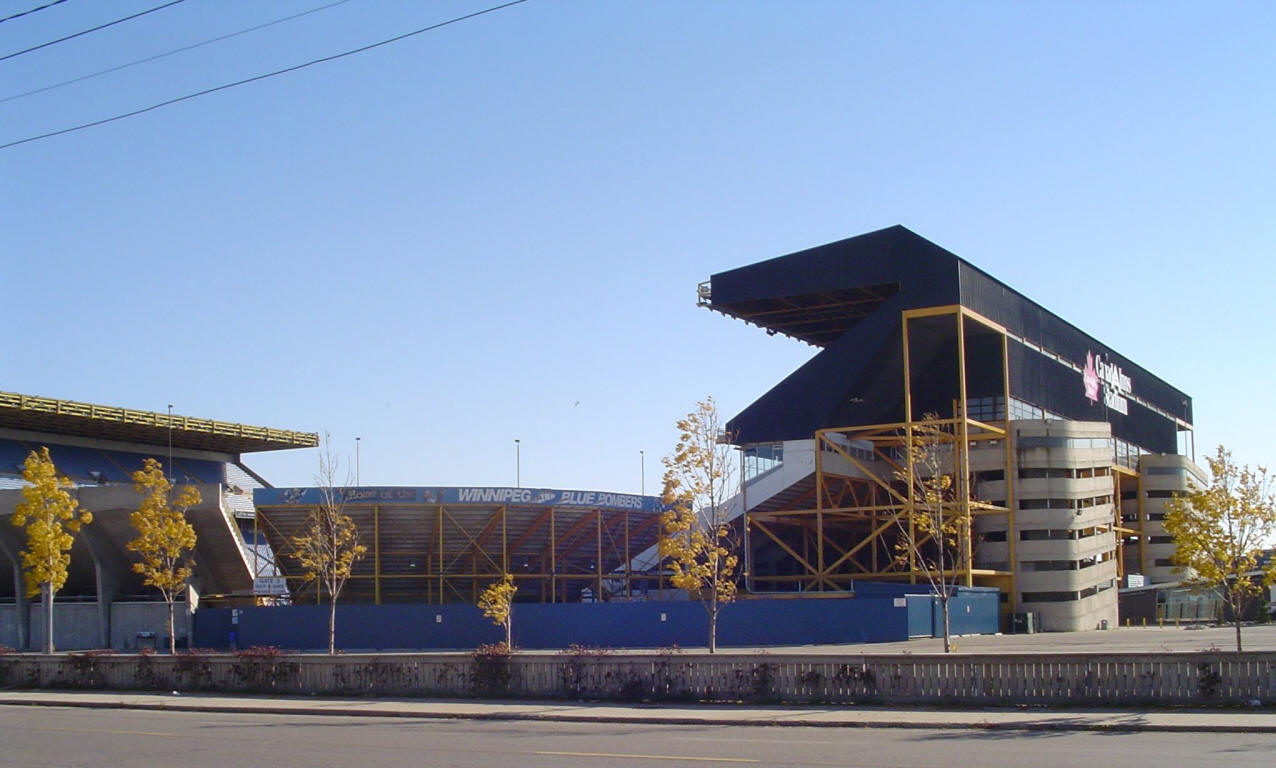
Canad Inns Stadium

Winnipeg has a number of skateboard parks- some leftovers from the 1970s and many more recent additions to the skateboard scene. In 2006, Winnipeg completed a project that saw the construction of a large skate plaza at the Forks. The plaza was visited by Tony Hawk in his Secret Skate Park Tour in the same year. In 2007 and 2008 the plaza was host to the Rogers WAM International skate board competition, in addition to numerous other competitive and non-competitive events.

== University sports ==
The University of Winnipeg and the University of Manitoba have active and successful programs in sports, especially volleyball and basketball. The University of Winnipeg's women's basketball team won 88 consecutive games during the 1990s, tying a college sports record. The University of Manitoba Bisons football team has won three Vanier Cup trophies, won the Hardy Trophy ten times and won the Mitchell Bowl four times. Volleyball is particularly strong, with consistently high-calibre play, dating back to the standing (in 2007) record of four consecutive national university championships held by the University of Winnipeg Wesmen since the early 1970s.

== Curling ==
Winnipeg is also home to many of the world's best curling teams and has hosted the World Curling Championships in 1978, 1991 and 2003. Several World Curling Championships winners have called Winnipeg home including Don Duguid, Kerry Burtnyk, Jeff Stoughton, Georgina Wheatcroft and Jennifer Jones.

== Roller Derby ==
Winnipeg is home to the Winnipeg Roller Derby League, a league member of the Women's Flat Track Derby Association founded in 2008. The league consists of three home teams (the Backseat Betties, the Corporation, and the Valkyries' Wrath) and two travel teams (the Bombshell Brawlers and the WRDL All-Stars). The WRDL All-Stars are a Women's Flat Track Derby Association charter team, travelling around North America to play other charter teams and competing to climb international rankings. Awareness of this sport continues to grow in Winnipeg, with an inaugural sold-out bout taking place at the Winnipeg Convention Centre in February, 2010 and the league marking its 10th Anniversary Season in 2018.

== Notable sports figures ==
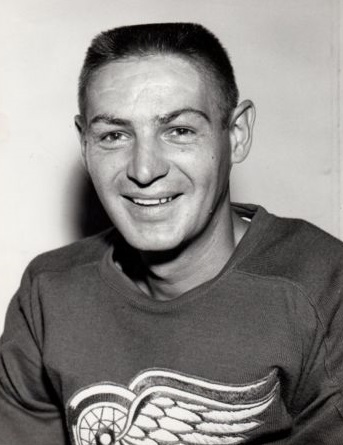
Terry Sawchuk won four Stanley Cups with the Detroit Red Wings and won the Vezina Trophy four times as the NHL's best goalie. Sawchuk was inducted into the Hockey Hall of Fame in 1971.

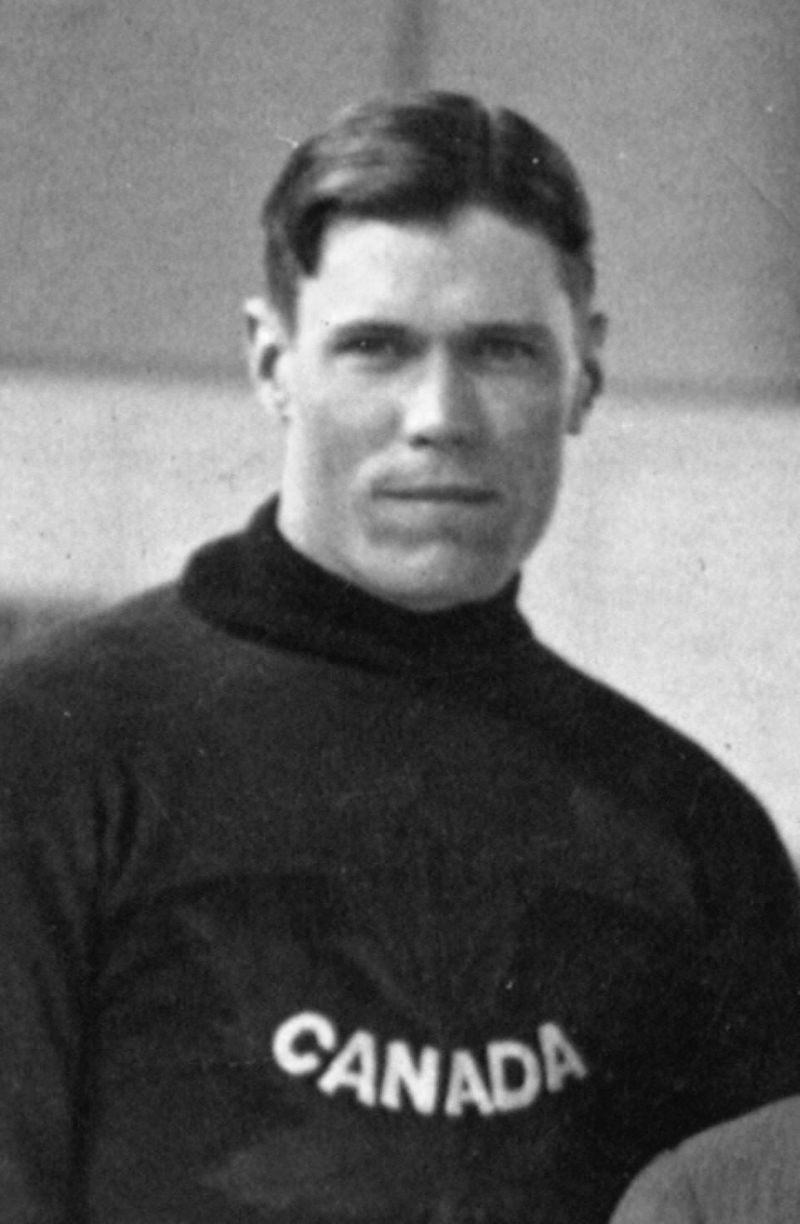
Frank Fredrickson was part of the Winnipeg Falcons, Canada's first gold medal ice hockey team, at the 1920 Olympics and was inducted into the Hockey Hall of Fame in 1958.

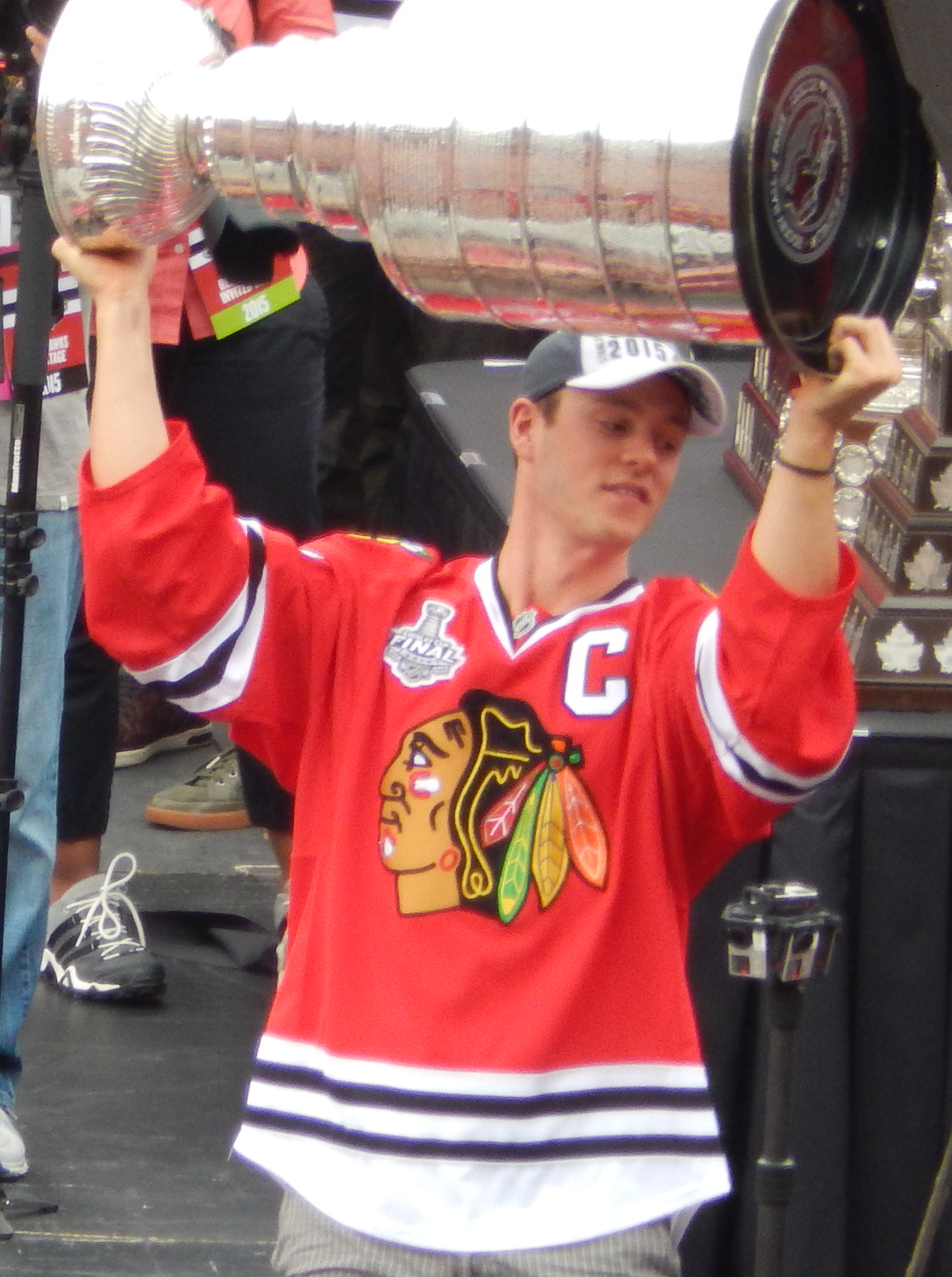
Jonathan Toews won three Stanley Cups with the Chicago Blackhawks and two Olympic gold medals with Canada.

=== Hockey figures ===
- Tyler Arnason, National Hockey League (NHL) forward
- Cam Barker, NHL defenceman
- Andy Bathgate, NHL forward, Hockey Hall of Fame inductee, Stanley Cup champion, Hart Trophy winner
- Jennifer Botterill, Canadian Women's Hockey League (CWHL) forward, three-time Olympic gold medallist, NHL on Sportsnet and Hockey Night in Canada panelist
- Art Coulter, NHL defenceman, Hockey Hall of Fame inductee, two-time Stanley Cup champion
- Max Domi, NHL forward
- Jimmy Dunn, sports executive, president of the Canadian Amateur Hockey Association (CAHA), Hockey Hall of Fame inductee
- Frank Fredrickson, NHL forward, Hockey Hall of Fame inductee, Stanley Cup champion, Olympic gold medallist
- Magnus Goodman, Olympic gold medallist
- Joel Hofer, NHL goaltender
- Dick Irvin, NHL coach, Hockey Hall of Fame inductee, four-time Stanley Cup champion as coach, 16 Stanley Cup finals appearances, 600 career wins as
- Seth Jarvis, NHL forward, Olympian
- Duncan Keith, NHL defenceman, Hockey Hall of Fame inductee, three-time Stanley Cup champion, two-time Olympic gold medallist, two-time Norris Trophy winner, Conn Smythe Trophy winner
- Ching Johnson, NHL defenceman, Hockey Hall of Fame inductee, two-time Stanley Cup champion
- Brendan Leipsic, NHL forward
- Bill Masterton, NHL forward, namesake of the NHL's Bill Masterton Memorial Trophy
- Denton Mateychuk, NHL defenceman
- Steamer Maxwell, Hockey Hall of Fame inductee, Olympic gold medallist
- Bill Mosienko, NHL forward, Hockey Hall of Fame inductee, Lady Byng Memorial Trophy winner, scored the fastest hat trick in NHL history (21 seconds)
- Colton Orr, NHL forward
- Nolan Patrick, NHL forward
- Kevin Quinn, hockey commentator
- Ken Reardon, NHL defenceman, Hockey Hall of Fame inductee, Stanley Cup champion
- Ryan Reaves, NHL forward
- Jack Ruttan, Hockey Hall of Fame inductee
- Terry Sawchuk, NHL goaltender, Hockey Hall of Fame inductee, four-time Stanley Cup champion, four-time Vezina Trophy winner, Calder Trophy winner
- Dave Semenko, NHL forward, two-time Stanley Cup champion
- Patrick Sharp, NHL forward, three-time Stanley Cup champion, Olympic gold medallist
- Sami Jo Small, CWHL goaltender, Olympic gold medallist
- Alexander Steen, NHL forward, Stanley Cup champion, St. Louis Blues general manager
- Mark Stone, NHL forward, Stanley Cup champion, Olympian
- Kati Tabin, Premier Hockey Federation (PHF) and Professional Women's Hockey League (PWHL) defenceman, Olympian
- Jonathan Toews, NHL forward, three-time Stanley Cup champion, two-time Olympic gold medallist, Conn Smythe Trophy winner, Selke Trophy winner
- Travis Zajac, NHL forward

=== Football figures ===
- Scott Flagel, Canadian Football League (CFL) defensive back, Canadian Football Hall of Fame inductee, Grey Cup champion
- Sydney Halter, first commissioner of the CFL, Canadian Football Hall of Fame inductee, officer of the Order of Canada
- T. J. Jones, National Football League (NFL) wide receiver
- Stan Mikawos, CFL defensive tackle, three-time Grey Cup champion
- Cal Murphy, CFL coach, Canadian Football Hall of Fame inductee, Grey Cup champion as coach of the Winnipeg Blue Bombers
- Brady Oliveira, CFL running back, two-time Grey Cup champion, CFL Most Outstanding Player Award winner, two-time CFL Most Outstanding Canadian Award winner
- John Urschel, NFL guard, mathematician
- Chris Walby, CFL offensive tackle, Canadian Football Hall of Fame inductee, three-time Grey Cup champion

=== Curling figures ===
- Jennifer Jones, curler, Olympic gold medallist, two-time world curling champion, tied for most Canadian women's curling championships (six), 17 Grand Slam of Curling victories
- Kaitlyn Lawes, curler, two-time Olympic gold medallist, world curling champion, Canadian women's curling champion
- John Morris, curler, two-time Olympic gold medallist, world curling champion, three-time Canadian men's curling champion

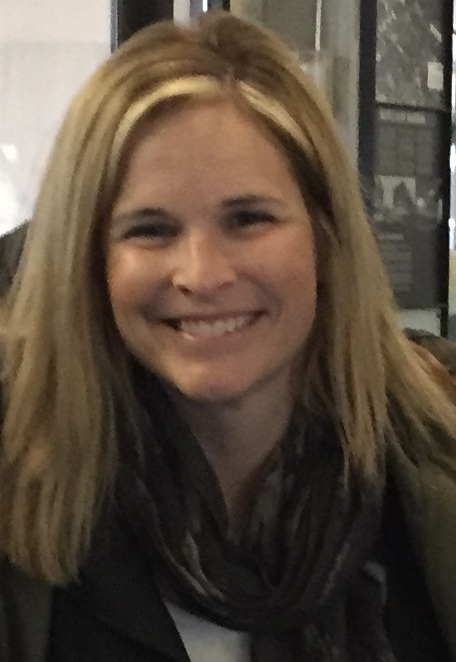
Jennifer Jones became the only female skip to go undefeated at an Olympic Games when she won gold at the 2014 Sochi Games. She is considered to be one of the greatest curlers of all-time

=== Baseball figues ===
- Eleanor Callow, All-American Girls Professional Baseball League (AAGPBL) left fielder, Canadian Baseball Hall of Fame inductee (Note: All Canadian-born AAGPBL players were inducted into the Canadian Baseball Hall of Fame as a group in 1998), three-time AAGPBL champion, all-time AAGPBL home run leader, pioneer of women's baseball
- Audrey Haine, AAGPBL pitcher, Canadian Baseball Hall of Fame inductee, pioneer of women's baseball
- Dottie Hunter, AAGPBL first basewoman, Canadian Baseball Hall of Fame inductee, pioneer of women's baseball
- Ruth Middleton, AAGPBL outfielder, Canadian Baseball Hall of Fame inductee, pioneer of women's baseball
- Wayne Norton, Canadian national baseball team manager, Major League Baseball (MLB) scout, Canadian Baseball Hall of Fame inductee
- Doris Shero, AAGPBL outfielder, Canadian Baseball Hall of Fame inductee, pioneer of women's baseball

=== Wrestling figures ===
- Don Callis, retired professional wrestler and current New Japan Pro Wrestling commentator
- Chris Jericho, professional wrestler, All Elite Wrestling (AEW), World Wrestling Federation/Entertainment (WWF/WWE)
- Kenny Omega, professional wrestler, All Elite Wrestling (AEW), New Japan Pro Wrestling (NJPW)
- Roddy Piper, professional wrestler, World Wrestling Federation (WWF)

=== Other sports figures ===
- Wes Brooker, Olympic sprinter and hurdler
- Rod Black, sports commentator for football, baseball and hockey
- Millie Cheater, Olympic sprinter
- Terry Fox, distance runner and cancer research activist, ran the Marathon of Hope, namesake of Terry Fox Run, youngest ever companion of the Order of Canada
- John "Army" Howard, Olympic sprinter, Canada's first Black Olympian
- Clara Hughes, Olympic speed skater and cyclist, Olympic gold medallist, only person to medal at both Summer and Winter Olympic Games
- Cindy Klassen, Olympic speed skater, Olympic gold medallist
- George Knudson, professional golfer, eight-time winner on the PGA Tour
- Vince Leah, sportswriter, member of the Order of Canada
- Brian MacLaren, Olympic sprinter
- Jeremy St. Louis, sports television and radio host
- Michelle Stilwell, Paralympic wheelchair racer, Paralympic gold medallist
- Nick Taylor, professional golfer, four-time winner on the PGA Tour
- Daniel Yanofsky, chess player, Canada and British Commonwealth's first chess grandmaster

== See also ==
- Winnipeg Toilers
