= Winnipeg Wolfpack =

Canadian women's football club

Logo

General information
- Founded: 2011
- Folded: 2024 (WWCFL)
- Stadium: IG Field
- Headquartered: Winnipeg, Manitoba
- Colours
- Website: www.winnipegwolfpack.com

Personnel
- Head coach: Kris Scoran

League / conference affiliations
- WWCFL; Prairie

The Winnipeg Wolfpack are a women's football club that were formerly members of the Western Women's Canadian Football League (WWCFL). The Wolfpack are based in Winnipeg, Manitoba.

== Team history ==
The Wolfpack were loosely organized for a number of years before the formulation of the WWCFL in 2011. Playing out of Nomads Field and affiliated with the Nomads Football Club, where a number of the women coached boys teams, the Wolfpack (at the time stylized as "Wolf Pack") would occasionally travel to Alberta to compete against the Edmonton Storm, Calgary Rockies, and Lethbridge Steel; those three teams together formed the Alberta Female Football League in 2011, the first move to establish stronger organization for women's football in western Canada. With the establishment of the WWCFL in 2011, the club formally established the North Winnipeg Nomads Wolf Pack to compete in the new league's Prairie Conference along with their crosstown rivals, the Manitoba Fearless, and new teams in Regina and Saskatoon. The team was coached by Richard Dudeck and former Winnipeg Blue Bombers Mike Hameluck and Glen Schapansky.

Winnipeg was winless in the WWCFL's inaugural season, dropping both of its games against the Fearless. The team opted to forfeit its first-round playoff match against the Saskatoon Valkyries, having lost the regular season match-up by a score of 78–6. However, the Wolfpack quickly improved and consistently got the best of their local rivals over the next six seasons, finishing below Manitoba in the standings only once. They lost their first playoff match, against the Regina Riot, in 2012. Although the Wolfpack went undefeated against the Fearless for three-straight seasons from 2013 to 2015, they found themselves unable to advance past either Regina or Saskatoon in the playoffs as those two teams captured each season's WWCFL Championship.

A bright spot for the Wolfpack was the play of young players like, Alexa Matwyczuk, who was one of three members of the club named to the Canadian national team ahead of the 2013 IFAF Women's World Championship, and Breanne Ward, one of five members of the Wolfpack who joined Team Canada in 2017.

The Wolfpack hosted the WWCFL Championship in 2015 at IG Field. In the game, the Riot won their first WWCFL title, defeating the Storm by a score of 53–6.

The Wolfpack struggled after 2016, and the team failed to win a game in four straight seasons as the Fearless gained the upper hand in the local rivalry, even advancing to the WWCFL Championship Final for the first time in 2022. The Wolfpack paused operations ahead of the 2024 WWCFL season. However, that summer the Wolfpack hosted a "Friendship Bowl" featuring invitational teams from Canada and the United States. The pause in WWCFL play led to many of the Wolfpack's players joining the Fearless starting in the 2025 season. In 2026, the Wolfpack confirmed that it had ended its affiliation with the WWCFL.

== Year by year ==
= Indicates Division Title (regular season)

= Indicates Conference Title

= Indicates League Championship

Season	League	Conf.	W	L	Conf. standing	Playoff result	Ref.
2011	WWCFL	Prairie	0	4	4th	Forfeit Conference Semifinal vs. Saskatoon Valkyries	
2012	WWCFL	Prairie	1	3	4th	Lost Conference Semifinal, 25–7 vs. Regina Riot	
2013	WWCFL	Prairie	2	2	3rd	Did not qualify	
2014	WWCFL	Prairie	2	2	3rd	Lost Conference Semifinal, 27–13 vs. Regina Riot	
2015	WWCFL	Prairie	2	2	3rd	Lost Conference Semifinal, 66–7 vs. Saskatoon Valkyries	
2016	WWCFL	Prairie	1	3	3rd	Lost Conference Semifinal, 59–7 vs. Regina Riot	
2017	WWCFL	Prairie	1	3	3rd	Did not qualify	
2018	WWCFL	Prairie	0	4	4th	Did not qualify	
2019	WWCFL	Prairie	0	4	4th	Lost Quarterfinal, 66–0 vs. Saskatoon Valkyries	
2020	WWCFL	Prairie	Seasons cancelled due to COVID-19 pandemic				
2021	WWCFL	Prairie	Seasons cancelled due to COVID-19 pandemic				
2022	WWCFL	Prairie	0	4	4th	Forfeit Quarterfinal vs. Saskatoon Valkyries	
2023	WWCFL	Prairie	0	4	4th	Forfeit Quarterfinal vs. Saskatoon Valkyries	
2024	WWCFL	Prairie	–	–	—	Did not play	
2025	WWCFL	Prairie	–	–	—	Did not play	
Totals (2011–2023)			9	35			

== IFAF competitors ==
The following lists women from the Winnipeg Wolfpack who have competed in the IFAF Women's World Championship as members of Team Canada.

2010	2013	2017
Christine O'Donnell	Amy Mohr; Christine O'Donnell; Alexa Matwyczuk	Alyssa Buckland; Jill Fast; Mubo Ilelaboye; Christine O'Donnell; Breanne Ward

== See also ==
- Women's gridiron football
