= Stephen Smith (Canadian football) =

Canadian gridiron football player (born 2002)

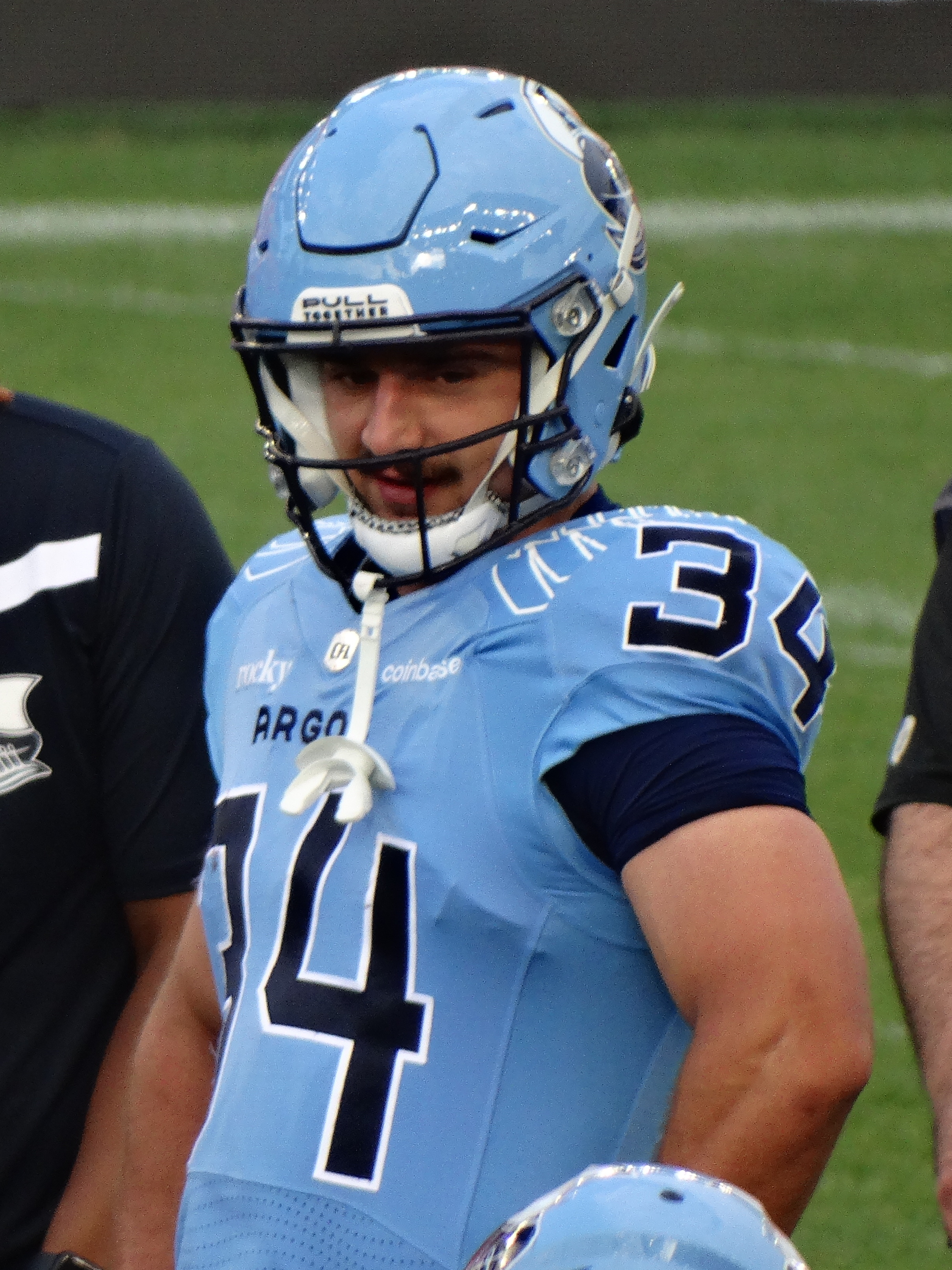
- Smith with the Toronto Argonauts in 2025

Profile
- Position: Linebacker

Personal information
- Born: January 10, 2002 (age 24); Abernethy, Saskatchewan, Canada
- Listed height: 6 ft 0 in (1.83 m)
- Listed weight: 220 lb (100 kg)

Career information
- High school: North Valley High (SK)
- CJFL: Regina Thunder

Career history
- 2024: Saskatchewan Roughriders*
- 2025: Toronto Argonauts
- * Offseason or practice squad member only
- Stats at CFL.ca

Stephen Smith (born January 10, 2002) is a Canadian professional football linebacker. He most recently played for the Toronto Argonauts of the Canadian Football League (CFL).

== Junior career ==
After missing his last year of football in high school due to a torn ACL and then another year due to the COVID-19 pandemic, Smith considered leaving the game of football. However, he joined the Regina Thunder of the Canadian Junior Football League (CJFL) in 2021 and spent four years with the team where he was named CJFL Defensive Player of the Year in 2023 and 2024. He played in 40 games where he recorded 315 tackles, including three tackles for a loss, 4.5 sacks, three interceptions, one forced fumble, and one blocked kick.

== Professional career ==
=== Saskatchewan Roughriders ===
On May 12, 2024, Smith signed with the Saskatchewan Roughriders just prior to the open of training camp. He spent the 2024 season on the practice roster while continuing to play with the Thunder. He became a free agent on the day after the team's season ended on November 10, 2025.

=== Toronto Argonauts ===
On December 20, 2024, it was announced that Smith had signed with the Toronto Argonauts. At the end of training camp in 2025, he accepted a practice roster spot to begin the season. He soon after made his professional debut on June 20, 2025, against his home-province Saskatchewan Roughriders. He played in seven regular season games where he had two special teams tackles. He was released in the following off-season on January 29, 2026.

== Personal life ==
Smith was born to parents Paul and Susan Smith. His brother, Matthew, also played in the CJFL for the Saskatoon Hilltops and his sister, Rachelle, played in the Western Women's Canadian Football League for the Regina Riot and Saskatoon Valkyries.
