= James McRae (disambiguation) =

James McRae (born 1987) is an Australian rower.

James McRae or MacRae may also refer to:

- James McRae (United States Army officer) (1862–1940), U.S. general
- James W. McRae (1910–1960), American engineer
- James Macrae (botanist) (died 1830), Scottish botanist
- James C. MacRae (1838–1909), justice of the North Carolina Supreme Court
- Jimmy McRae (born 1943), British rally driver
- Jim MacRae (American football) (1878–1957), American football player and mayor
- Jim MacRae (Canadian football) (1926–?), Canadian football player and lawyer

== See also ==
- James McCrae (disambiguation)
