= Edmonton Arctic Pride =

Women's football team

Logo

General information
- Founded: 2025
- Stadium: Clarke Stadium
- Headquartered: Edmonton, Alberta
- Colours
- Website: arcticpridefootball.com

Personnel
- Head coach: Marcus Henry

League / conference affiliations
- WWCFL; Western

Championships
- Conference titles: 2; 2025, 2026

The Edmonton Arctic Pride are a women's football team in the Western Women's Canadian Football League's (WWCFL) Western Conference. The team is based in Edmonton, Alberta. The team was founded and began play in 2025 after the Edmonton Storm, one of the WWCFL's founding teams, ceased operations.

== Team history ==
The Edmonton Storm operated as Edmonton's women's football team from its establishment in 2004 and was a founding team of the WWCFL in 2011 and three-time championship finalists. However, the Storm paused operations in 2024, leaving Edmonton without a top-level women's team. By early 2025, a group of former players and former Edmonton Elks player Marcus Henry began organizing the Arctic Pride to fill that void. This was seen as important given a dramatic growth in youth participation in women's football in Alberta.

The Arctic Pride saw immediate success on the field after joining the WWCFL. In the 2025 season the team posted a 3–1 regular season record and advanced all the way to the league's championship final after defeating the Calgary Rage in the Western Conference final by a score of 6–0. In the title game, which Edmonton hosted, the Arctic Pride were defeated 28–0 by the Saskatoon Valkyries, who won their fifth consecutive league title. The following season saw the Arctic Pride post an undefeated 4–0 record. The Arctic Pride again advanced to the championship game, which was a re-match against the Valkyries, this time in Saskatoon, with both teams entering the game with perfect records. The Arctic Pride opened the scoring with a touchdown, but ultimately lost by a score of 40–7.

== Year-by-year record ==
= Indicates Division Title (regular season)

= Indicates Conference Title

= Indicates League Championship

Season	League	Conf.	W	L	Conf. standing	Playoff result	Ref.
2025	WWCFL	Western	3	1	2nd	Lost WWCFL Final, 28–0 vs. Saskatoon Valkyries	
2026	WWCFL	Western	4	0	1st	Lost WWCFL Final, 40–7 vs. Saskatoon Valkyries	
Totals (2025–2026)			7	1			

== See also ==
- Women's gridiron football
