= University of Lethbridge Community Stadium =

Multi-sports stadium in Alberta, Canada

- U of L Community Stadium
- Interactive map of University of Lethbridge Community Stadium
- Location: Lethbridge, Alberta, Canada
- Coordinates: 49.668°N 112.865°W
- Capacity: 2,000

Construction
- Opened: 25 September 2009
- Cost: $12 million

Tenants
- Lethbridge Pronghorns (U Sports) (2009–Present); Lethbridge Steel (WWCFL) (2010–Present); Lethbridge Vipers (CJFL) (starting 2022)

The University of Lethbridge Community Stadium is a multi-sports venue in Lethbridge, Alberta, Canada.

It was built in a partnership between the city of Lethbridge and the University of Lethbridge with additional funding from the province of Alberta. As such, in addition to Lethbridge Pronghorns teams, the stadium is used by teams from the broader community including the Lethbridge Steel of the Western Women's Canadian Football League and the Vipers of the Canadian Junior Football League.
