= Harry Irving =

Harry Irving may refer to:

- Harry Irving (Canadian football) (1927–2006), Canadian football player
- Harry Irving (chemist) (1905–1993), British chemist
- Harry Brodribb Irving (1870–1919), British stage actor and actor-manager

== See also ==
- Henry Irving (disambiguation)
