= North Winnipeg Nomads Football Club =

North Winnipeg Nomads
- Founded: 1969
- League: Football Manitoba
- Based in: Winnipeg, Manitoba, Canada
- Colours: green and gold
- Championships: 1970, 1972, 1973, 1974, 1979, 1980, 1981, 1990, 1993, 1994, 1996, 2002, 2005, 2006, 2008, 2009, 2010, 2011, 2012, 2013, 2017
- Website: nomadsfootball.com

The North Winnipeg Nomads Football Club is a Canadian football club established in 1969 and originally started as a single bantam age (15-year-olds) football team. Eventually, the club grew to include teams from ages 7 to 21. The Nomads has the second largest enrolment in Canadian amateur football.

== History ==
The Nomads were the first Winnipeg team to win the Western Canadian Bantam Football Championship since its inception in 1967.

The club has won 23 Manitoba provincial championship titles plus two interprovincial titles.

A minor bantam (14-year-olds) team was added in 1978.

The club moved to the former Winnipeg Hawkeyes field and clubhouse in 1997.

In 2002, after the Manitoba Lotteries Corp. backed away from plans to purchase the field and relocate the club, the Nomads Board began planning and fundraising for much needed field improvements. Their successful efforts resulted in installation of the field lighting, automated sprinkler system, improved seating, and the perimeter fence in 2004.

This period also saw the Nomads grow from just under 200 players in 2000, to 330 by 2003, making it one of the largest clubs in Western Canada.

In 2011, the Nomads club welcomed the North Winnipeg Nomads Wolf Pack, a senior women's tackle football team (ages 16+) that competes in the Western Women's Canadian Football League, which spans the three prairie provinces.

The Nomads have competed against teams from and around Winnipeg, including the East Side Eagles, the Transcona Nationals, the St. Boniface Warriors, the Ft. Garry Lions, the St. Vital Mustangs, the St. James Rods, the Lockport Cowboys, the Greendell Falcons, Eastman Raiders and Valour Patriots.

== Championships by Year ==
=== 1970s ===
- 1970 Bantam Provincial and Western Canadian Champions
- 1972 Bantam Provincial and Western Canadian Champions
- 1973 Bantam Provincial and Western Canadian Champions
- 1974 Bantam Provincial Champions
- 1979 Minor Bantam Provincial Champions

=== 1980s ===
- 1980 Minor Bantam Provincial Champions
- 1981 Bantam Provincial Champions

=== 1990s ===
- 1990 Bantam Provincial Champions
- 1993 Minor Bantam Provincial Champions
- 1994 Bantam Champions
- 1995 Peewee Champions

=== 2000s ===
- 2002 Midget Provincial Champions
- 2005 Bantam Provincial Champions
- 2006 Midget Provincial Champions
- 2008
  - Atom Provincial Champions (Nomads Atom North Team)
  - Peewee Provincial Champions
  - Major Provincial Champions
- 2009
  - Minor Bantam Provincial Champions
  - Major Provincial Champions

=== 2010s ===
- 2010 Midget Provincial Champions
- 2011 Bantam Provincial Champions
- 2012
  - Pee Wee Provincial Champions
  - Midget Provincial Champions
- 2013
  - Junior Girls Manitoba Champions
  - Bantam Provincial Champions
- 2017
  - Atom A Championship
  - Bantam A Championship

== Championships by League ==
- Bantam Western Canadian Championships
  - 1970, 1972, 1973
- Bantam Provincial Championships
  - 1970, 1972, 1973, 1974, 1981, 1990, 1994, 2005, 2011, 2013, 2017
- Junior Manitoba Girls Championships
  - 2013
- Major Provincial Championships
  - 2008, 2009
- Midget Provincial Championships
  - 2002, 2006, 2010, 2012
- Minor Bantam Provincial Championships
  - 1979, 1980, 1993
- Peewee Provincial Championships
  - 1995, 2012
- Atom Provincial Championships
  - 2017

== CFL Alumni ==
- Jason Dzikowicz played for the Winnipeg Blue Bombers
- Harold Jackman played for the Ottawa Rough Riders
- Kurt Goodrich played for the Winnipeg Blue Bombers
- Rick Koswin played for the Winnipeg Blue Bombers
- Mark McLoughlin played Minor Bantam in 1979 and Bantam in 1980. He was the kicker for the Calgary Stampeders starting in 1988, when he was drafted as Calgary's third round draft choice (20th overall) in the CFL Canadian College Draft.
- Mike O'Donnell played for the Montreal Alouettes
- Brady Oliveira plays for the Winnipeg Blue Bombers
- Gary Rosolowich played for the Winnipeg Blue Bombers
- Eddie Steele plays for the Edmonton Eskimos

== NHL Alumni ==
- Colton Orr – Boston Bruins, New York Rangers and Toronto Maple Leafs
- Travis Zajac – New Jersey Devils
