= Julie Paetsch =

- Born: February 23, 1988 (age 37); Lanigan, Saskatchewan, Canada
- Height: 5 ft 3 in (160 cm)
- Weight: 145 lb (66 kg; 10 st 5 lb)
- Position: Forward
- Canada West CWHL team: Saskatchewan; Calgary Inferno
- Playing career: 2006–present

Julie Paetsch
Medal record

Women's football

Representing Canada

IFAF World Women's Championships
Silver medal – second place	2010 Sweden	Tournament
Silver medal – second place	2013 Finland	Tournament

Julie Paetsch (born February 23, 1988) is an athlete from Lanigan, Saskatchewan. Currently, she is a two-sport athlete in hockey and football. Selected by the Calgary Inferno in the 2013 CWHL Draft, she is also a competitor for the Saskatoon Valkyries of the Western Women's Canadian Football League.

She also competed with the Canadian national women’s team at the inaugural IFAF World Women's Football Championships in 2010, which she also did three years later. At the 2013 IFAF Women’s Worlds in Vantaa, Finland, she was named one of the captains for the Canadian team.

== Athletic career ==
=== Hockey ===
Prior to joining the Saskatchewan Huskies in 2008, Paetsch competed for the University of Regina Cougars. During the 2009-10 campaign, she participated in 24 games, scoring 10 goals and accumulating 26 assists. Her 26 assists during the 2009-10 stand as the second highest single season total in Huskies history. The following season, she recorded nine goals and 14 assists in 24 contests.

As a fifth-year student, Julie Paetsch was named the 2011-12 Canada West women’s hockey Player of the Year. The Huskies alternate captain, Paetsch finished the season as the Canada West leader in scoring with 34 points. Her 14 goals and 20 assists were accumulated in 24 games as the Huskies enjoyed a won-loss record of 16-6-2. Her seven power play goals and 113 shots ranked fourth overall in the CIS. In ten contests, she had multiple point games, while logging three or more points on four separate occasions. It marked the second time in Saskatchewan history that a skater has been named Canada West MVP. Breanne George claimed the award in 2009-10.

=== Football ===
She was on the silver medallist team at the 2010 women's World tackle football Championships in Stockholm, Sweden and in 2013 at Vantaa, Finland. In 2010, she was Canada’s leading rusher with 321 rushing yards. Three years later, despite losing to the United States again in the gold medal match, she was named Canada’s Most Outstanding Player of the Game. At the 2013 IFAF Worlds, Paetsch was the leading tackler for Canada. In the gold medal game against the United States, she led all Canadian players with 11 tackles. She returned one punt for 35 yards and a touchdown in a win against Spain while ranking third on Canada with 101 all-purpose yards.

With the Saskatoon Valkyries, she helped the squad to WWCFL championships in 2011, 2012 and 2013. During the 2011 WWCFL championship game, she scored four touchdowns as the Valkyries defeated the Edmonton Storm by a 35-7 tally. For her efforts, Paetsch was recognized as the game’s Most Valuable Player.

== Career stats ==
=== Football ===
Year	Event	Tckl	Solo	Ast	Sacks	TFL	Int	Yards	Avg	Long	TD	FF	FR
2013	IFAF Women’s Worlds	6.5	5	3	0	2	0	0	0	0	0	0	0

== Awards and honors ==
- 2010 Canada West Second team Hockey All-star
- 2012 Canada West women’s hockey player of the year
- 2012 Canada West First Team Hockey All-Star
- 2011 WWCFL Championship Game Most Valuable Player
- 2013 Canada’s Most Outstanding Player, Gold Medal Game, IFAF Women’s World Championships
