= Edmonton Storm =

Edmonton Storm may refer to:

- Edmonton Storm (football), a Canadian women's tackle football team
- Edmonton Storm (rugby league), an Australian club in the Cairns District Rugby League
- Hemel Storm, an English basketball team formerly known as Edmonton Storm
