= Saskatoon Minor Football Field =

Canadian football stadium in Saskatchewan

- Gordie Howe Bowl
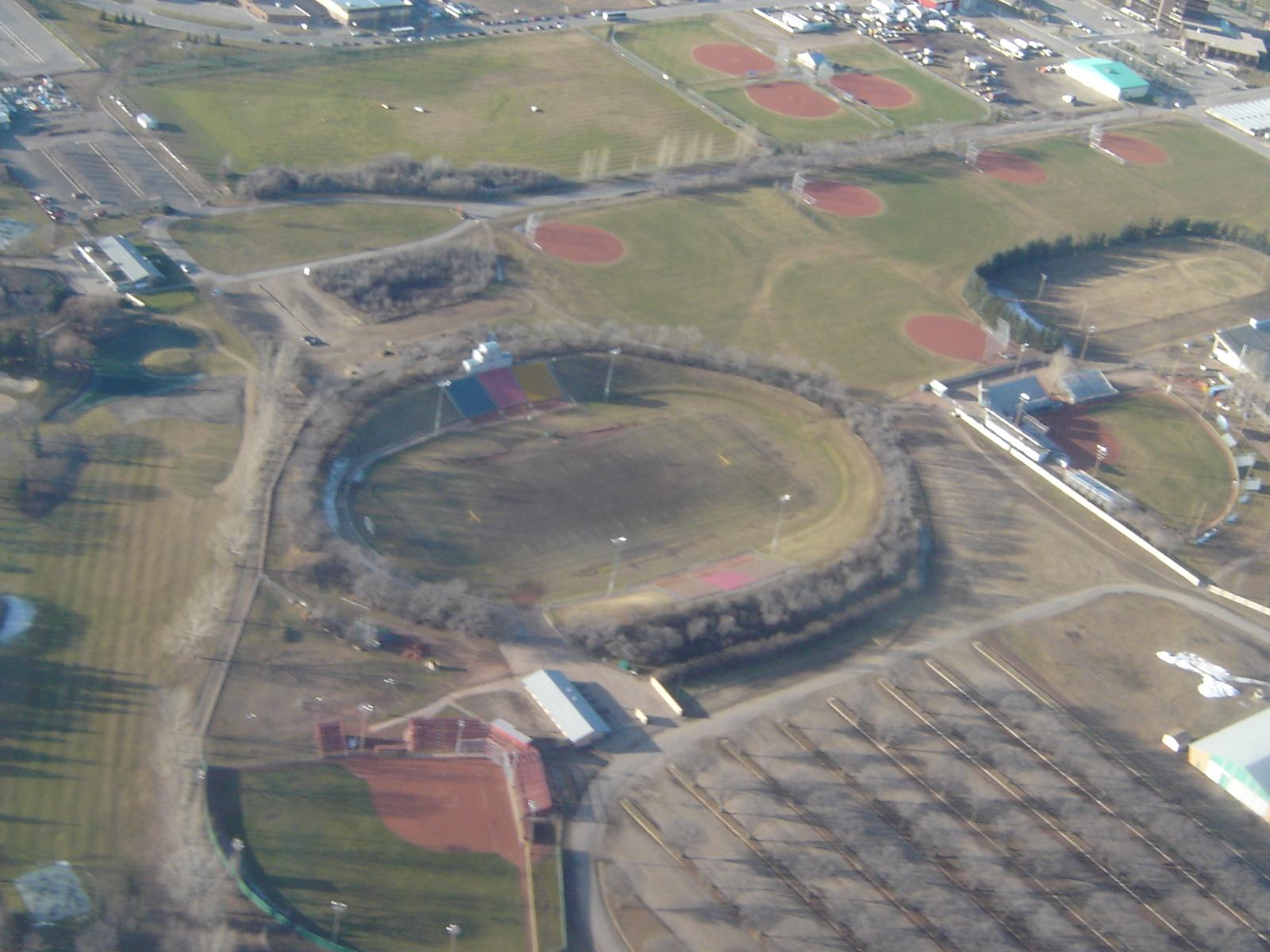
- SMF Field (Gordie Howe Bowl) in 2005
- Interactive map of Saskatoon Minor Football Field
- Address: 1525 Avenue P South
- Location: Saskatoon, Saskatchewan, Canada
- Coordinates: 6752°6′30″N 106°41′53″W
- Owner: City of Saskatoon
- Operator: City of Saskatoon
- Capacity: 5,000
- Surface: Artificial turf

Construction
- Opened: September 30, 1960

Tenants
- Saskatoon Hilltops (CJFL); Saskatchewan Selects; Saskatoon Valkyries (WWCFL); Forza Soccer Academy (PPL) (2026–present); Saskatchewan EXCEL (PPL) (2026–present)

The Saskatoon Minor Football Field at Gordon Howe Park (formerly known as Gordie Howe Bowl) is a football stadium located in Saskatoon, Saskatchewan, Canada. It was opened September 30, 1960, built on land repossessed by the city in 1931 for unpaid taxes. It is the home of the Saskatoon Hilltops, who play in the Prairie Football Conference of the Canadian Junior Football League, the Saskatoon Valkyries of the Western Women's Canadian Football League, and is also used for high school football. It is located on the southwest corner of the city. The park is named after Gordie Howe, a Saskatoon native and member of the Hockey Hall of Fame.

== Upgrades ==
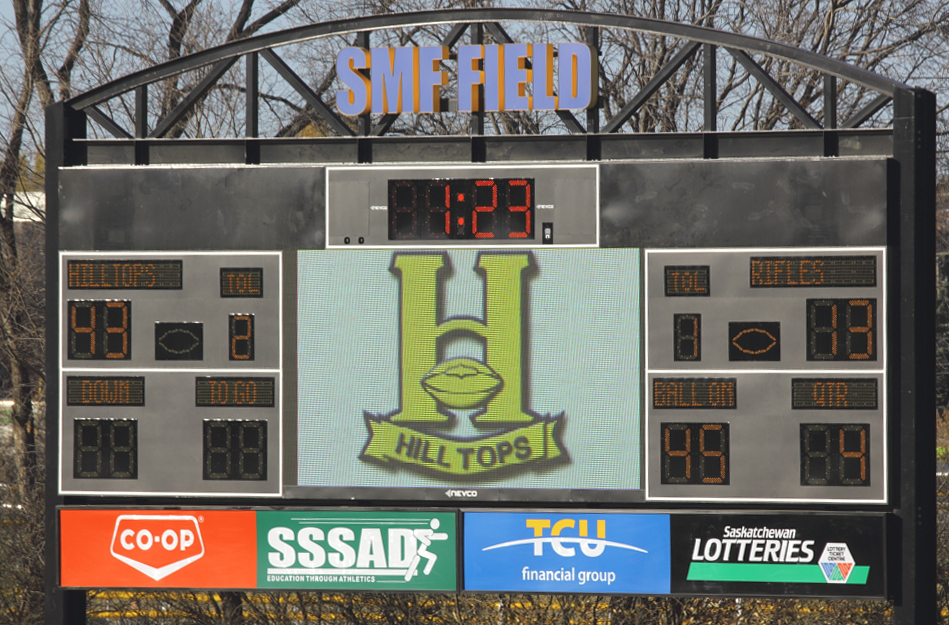
New scoreboard in October 2014

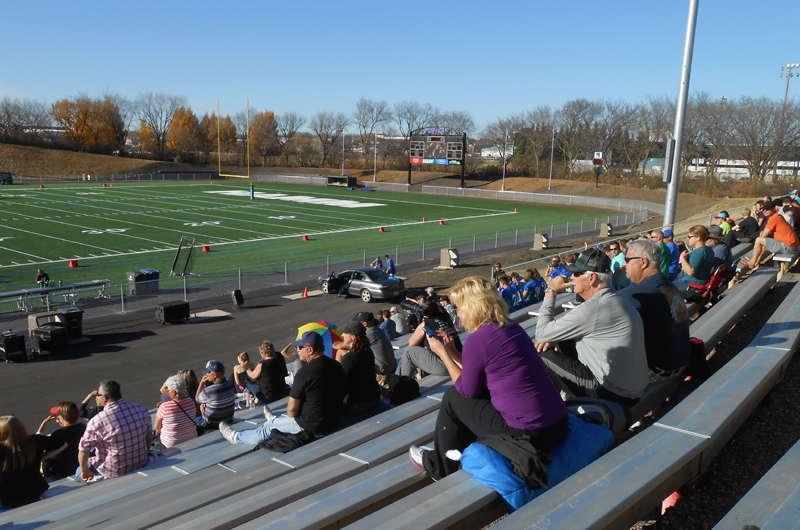
North end of SMF Field

The city considered closing the stadium in 2006 due to maintenance costs.

In 2008, a master plan for Gordie Howe Bowl was formulated and the facility was expected to receive $30 million for expansion and upgrades. It would have included artificial turf, an additional eight lane track complete with a throws and jump area, and expanded bleacher seating for 6500 spectators. Athletic facilities including public washrooms, change rooms and concession, and fencing were to be constructed in the first phase, costing $12.4 million. The cost would have been shared by the federal government ($4.1 million), the city ($2.9 million), corporate sponsors ($1.4 million) and admission levy ($4 million). The second phase was expected to cost $12.8 million and provide new bleachers, a new press box, additional washrooms, concessions, meeting rooms, landscaping and an entry plaza. Phase 3 of the project, pegged at $4.8 million, would have provided a paved parking lot, private boxes and more landscaping. The bowl improvements would enable hosting of soccer and track and field teams.

Renovations were delayed because of opposition to an admission levy by users of the facility, creating a budget shortfall. In 2009, city council considered a proposal to turn Gordie Howe Bowl into a multi-purpose events centre, capable of staging concerts, family events and trade shows. A consultant was hired to study the idea, which was expected to generate additional revenue. However, by January 2011, mayor Don Atchison said the event centre plans were no longer feasible. A report to council updating the status of the project was slated for March 2011.

In October 2011, the city revealed scaled-back plans worth $9.8 million to upgrade the turf, score clock, lighting, dressing rooms, washrooms, concession and sound system. The facility would not be used as an event centre, as previously proposed. A group called the Friends of the Bowl Foundation was formed in 2012, which included several sports organizations that use the stadium. A memorandum of understanding was signed between the city and the foundation, which committed both parties to funding the upgrades. The grass playing field was replaced with artificial turf during the first phase of upgrades. The upgrades also included new lighting, score clock and sound system.

In 2014, the facility name was changed to Saskatoon Minor Football Field at Gordon Howe Park. City council approved the name change at the request of a major donor, the Yausie family. The upgrades to the facility were expected to be complete by September 2014. On Saturday, September 6, 2014, the first Hilltop game was played on the newly installed artificial turf against the Regina Thunder. With funding by Friends of the Bowl Foundation, community donors and the City of Saskatoon, new scoreboard, lights and sound system were also new additions. A new clubhouse was opened in 2015 and includes dressing rooms for both football and softball teams, concession, office space, meeting space, banquet facilities and a concession. which is estimated to cost $1.5 million.

The venue will see further renovations, starting in 2017. Seating for 2500 was donated by the Saskatchewan Roughriders from Mosaic Stadium at Taylor Field and installed on the east side ready for the regular season. Furthermore, another 2500 seats from the old stadium were installed on the west side along with nine corporate boxes including a press box and general common room for guests. In the spring of 2018, excavation started on the grounds for building an Olympic size track and field and skating oval. A 90,000 square foot facility was also built for indoor baseball practices, along with a weight room, a new baseball ticket office and upgrades to the ball diamonds. The planning slate also has a new Nordic skiing track, another artificial football field and five paved parking lots, all to be completed sometime in 2019.

== Tenants ==
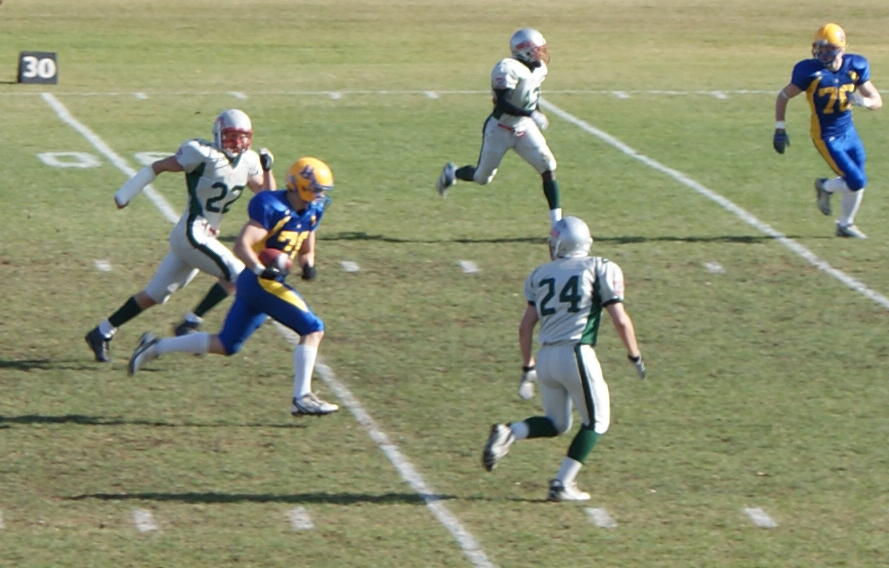
Saskatoon Hilltops during a 2008 playoff game on the old grass turf at Gordie Howe Field

Team	League	Years	Notes
Aden Bowman Bears	Saskatoon High School Football League	1960-	
Bedford Road Redhawks	Saskatoon High School Football League	1960-	
Bethlehem Stars	Saskatoon High School Football League	2008-	
BJM Saints	Saskatoon High School Football League	1986-	
Centennial Chargers	Saskatoon High School Football League	2007-	
City Park Cowboys	Saskatoon High School Football League	1960-1985	Changed to an alternate high school with the opening of Marion Graham; as a result dropped football.
E. D. Feehan Trojans	Saskatoon High School Football League	1966-2006	Suspended football after the 2006 season, with the opening of Bethlehem Catholic High School
Evan Hardy Souls	Saskatoon High School Football League	1967-	
Holy Cross Crusaders	Saskatoon High School Football League	1960-	
Marion Graham Falcons	Saskatoon High School Football League	1986-	
Mount Royal Mustangs	Saskatoon High School Football League	1960-	
North Battleford Composite Vikings	Saskatoon High School Football League	1995-	Joined the Saskatoon league when the SHSAA allowed schools to participate in playoffs below their league level.
Nutana Blues	Saskatoon High School Football League	1960-	Dropped sports when it converted to an alternate high school.
PA Carlton Crusaders	Saskatoon High School Football League	1995-	Joined the Saskatoon league when the SHSAA allowed schools to participate in playoffs below their league level.
PA St. Mary Crusaders	Saskatoon High School Football League	2007-	
St. Joseph Guardians	Saskatoon High School Football League	1995-	
St. Paul's Saints	Saskatoon High School Football League	1960-66	Closed in 1966 and was replaced by E. D. Feehan High School.
Saskatoon Hilltops	Canadian Junior Football League	1960-	
Saskatoon Valkyries	Western Women's Canadian Football League	2015-	
Tommy Douglas Tigers	Saskatoon High School Football League	2008-	
Walter Murray Marauders	Saskatoon High School Football League	1960-	
