= Lethbridge Steel =

Western Women's Canadian Football League team

Logo

General information
- Founded: 2010
- Stadium: University of Lethbridge Community Stadium
- Headquartered: Lethbridge, Alberta
- Colours
- Website: www.lethbridgesteelfootball.com

Personnel
- Head coach: Mike Peters

League / conference affiliations
- WWCFL; Western

Championships
- Conference championships: 3; 2012, 2013, 2014

The Lethbridge Steel is a women's football team in the Western Women's Canadian Football League's (WWCFL) Western Conference. The team is based in Lethbridge, Alberta.

== Team history ==
The Steel were founded in 2010 and joined the Edmonton Storm and the Calgary Rockies in creating a new league, the Alberta Female Football League (AFFL). The league played just one season before the three Alberta teams became charter members of the WWCFL, joining the Manitoba Fearless and new teams in Winnipeg, Regina, and Saskatoon. The WWCFL began play in 2011 as a seven-team league.

The WWCFL was divided into two conferences, with the three Alberta-based teams forming the Western Conference. In the inaugural WWCFL season the Steel posted a 1–3 record; they lost their first three matches before winning their final regular season game by a score of 34–32 over Calgary. They then lost a re-match against the Rage in the first round of the playoffs. However, Lethbridge was the host city for the first WWCFL Championship game, in which the Saskatoon Valkyries defeated the Storm to become the first league champions.

Lethbridge had its most successful run from 2012 to 2014, losing just one regular season game in three seasons and advancing to the WWCFL title game as the Western Conference champion all three seasons. However, the Steel finished as the runner-up all three years, losing the final to Saskatoon each year. During this period the Western Conference also expanded to include two new teams, the Northern Anarchy and the Okotoks Lady Outlawz. Okotokz played only the 2013 season before suspending operations.

In 2018, the Steel posted a strong regular season with the best defense in the WWCFL, allowing only 33 points against during the regular season. However, they lost a dramatic first-round playoff match against Edmonton by a score of 45–44, which ended their season.

The WWCFL cancelled its 2020 and 2021 seasons due to the COVID-19 pandemic. The Steel struggled after play resumed in 2022, losing their first game 69–0 and failing to win a game through the 2024 season.

== Year by year ==
= Indicates Division Title (regular season)

= Indicates Conference Title

= Indicates League Championship

Season	League	Conf.	W	L	Conf. standing	Playoff result	Ref.
2011	WWCFL	Western	1	3	3rd	Lost Western Conference Semifinal, 26–14 vs. Calgary Rage	
2012	WWCFL	Western	3	0	1st	Lost WWCFL Final, 64–21 vs. Saskatoon Valkyries	
2013	WWCFL	Western	3	0	1st	Lost WWCFL Final, 27–13 vs. Saskatoon Valkyries	
2014	WWCFL	Western	3	1	2nd	Lost WWCFL Final, 53–0 vs. Saskatoon Valkyries	
2015	WWCFL	Western	2	2	3rd	Did not qualify	
2016	WWCFL	Western	1	3	3rd	Lost Western Conference Final, 14–4 vs. Edmonton Storm	
2017	WWCFL	Western	0	4	3rd	Did not qualify	
2018	WWCFL	Western	3	1	2nd	Lost Western Conference Semifinal, 45–44 vs. Edmonton Storm	
2019	WWCFL	Western	2	2	3rd	Lost Cross-Conference Final, 53–0 vs. Saskatoon Valkyries	
2020	WWCFL	Western	Seasons cancelled due to COVID-19 pandemic				
2021	WWCFL	Western	Seasons cancelled due to COVID-19 pandemic				
2022	WWCFL	Western	0	4	3rd	Did not qualify	
2023	WWCFL	Western	0	4	3rd	Forfeit Quarterfinal vs. Edmonton Storm	
2024	WWCFL	Western	0	4	2nd	Did not qualify	
2025	WWCFL	Western	0	4	3rd	Lost Conference Semifinal, 37–0 vs. Edmonton Arctic Pride	
2026	WWCFL	Western	1	3	3rd	Lost Conference Semifinal, 9–0 vs. Calgary Rage	
Totals (2011–2026)			19	35			

== IFAF competitors ==
Two members of the Lethbridge Steel have competed in the IFAF Women's World Championship as members of Team Canada, both at the 2017 IFAF Women's World Championship: Wendy Iwaasa and Rebeckah Heninger.

== See also ==
- Women's gridiron football
