= Eddie Steele =

Canadian football player (born 1988)

No. 97
- Position: Defensive tackle

Personal information
- Born: July 4, 1988 (age 38); Winnipeg, Manitoba, Canada
- Listed height: 6 ft 2 in (1.88 m)
- Listed weight: 280 lb (127 kg)

Career information
- High school: Kelvin
- University: Manitoba
- CFL draft: 2010: 3rd round, 22nd overall pick

Career history
- 2010–2012: Hamilton Tiger-Cats
- 2013–2016: Edmonton Eskimos
- 2017–2018: Saskatchewan Roughriders

Awards and highlights
- Grey Cup champion (2015)
- Stats at CFL.ca

Eddie Steele (born July 4, 1988) is a Canadian former professional football defensive tackle who recently played in the Canadian Football League (CFL). He was drafted 22nd overall by the Hamilton Tiger-Cats in the 2010 CFL draft. He played college football for the Manitoba Bisons. As a kid, Eddie's first football team was the North Winnipeg Nomads, and later the Kelvin Clippers. He played a crucial role in the team winning a U of M Vanier Cup championship.
