= Henry Irving (disambiguation) =

Henry Irving (1838–1905) was an English actor.

Henry Irving may also refer to:

- Henry Brodribb Irving (1870–1919) was an English actor, son of the above
- Henry Turner Irving (1833–1923), Governor of British Guyana
- Henry Irving (1950–2016), candidate in the Massachusetts House of Representatives elections, 2006

== See also ==
- Harry Irving (disambiguation)
