= Edmonton Storm (football) =

Canadian women's tackle football team

Logo

General information
- Founded: 2004
- Folded: 2024
- Stadium: Clarke Stadium
- Headquartered: Edmonton, Alberta
- Colours
- Mascot: Storm Bear
- Website: edmontonstorm.com

Personnel
- Owner: Joseph Williams
- Head coach: Eric Theroux

League / conference affiliations
- WWCFL; Western

Championships
- Conference championships: 3; 2011, 2015, 2016

The Edmonton Storm were a women's football team in the Western Women's Canadian Football League's (WWCFL) Western Conference. The team was based in Edmonton, Alberta. The Storm were Alberta's oldest competitive women's tackle football club.

== Team history ==
The Storm were founded in 2004. By 2010, there was growing momentum around women's football in Alberta, and the Storm joined together with the Calgary Rockies and Lethbridge Steel clubs to form the Alberta Female Football League (AFFL). The Storm finished atop the league in its lone season. In 2011, the AFFL was absorbed by the WWCFL, which included the Manitoba Fearless and new teams based in Winnipeg, Regina, and Saskatoon. The league began play in 2011 with the Alberta-based teams forming the Western Conference, and the four other teams forming the Prairie Conference.

The inaugural WWCFL season was a successful one for the Storm. The team was undefeated during the regular season, finishing atop the Western Conference. The team ultimately advanced to the WWCFL Final, where they faced the Saskatoon Valkyries in Lethbridge. The Valkyries defeated the Storm by a score of 35–7 to become the first WWCFL Champions.

The Storm had a successful run from 2013–2016, a period that saw two new Alberta-based teams join the WWCFL in the Northern Anarchy, based in Grande Prairie, and the Okotokz Lady Outlawz. The Storm did not lose a regular season game for four straight seasons, and they returned to the WWCFL Championship final in consecutive years in 2015 and 2016. However, they lost both finals. In 2015, they lost to the Regina Riot, while they lost again to the Valkyries in 2016.

The Storm paused operations ahead of the 2024 season. This left Edmonton without a WWCFL team until the founding of the Edmonton Arctic Pride ahead of the 2025 season.

== Year by year ==
= Indicates Division Title (regular season)

= Indicates Conference Title

= Indicates League Championship

Season	League	Conf.	W	L	Conf. standing	Playoff result	Ref.
2011	WWCFL	Western	4	0	1st	Lost WWCFL Final, 35–7 vs. Saskatoon Valkyries	
2012	WWCFL	Western	1	3	3rd	Lost Western Conference Final, 20–0 vs. Lethbridge Steel	
2013	WWCFL	Western	3	0	2nd	Lost Western Conference Final, 32–27 vs. Lethbridge Steel	
2014	WWCFL	Western	4	0	1st	Lost Western Conference Final vs. Lethbridge Steel	
2015	WWCFL	Western	4	0	1st	Lost WWCFL Final, 53–6 vs. Regina Riot	
2016	WWCFL	Western	4	0	1st	Lost WWCFL Final, 81–6 vs. Saskatoon Valkyries	
2017	WWCFL	Western	2	2	2nd	Lost Consolation Final, 44–20 vs. Saskatoon Valkyries	
2018	WWCFL	Western	2	2	3rd	Lost Semifinal, 45–0 vs. Regina Riot	
2019	WWCFL	Western	3	1	1st	Lost Semifinal, 30–8 vs. Regina Riot	
2020	WWCFL	Western	Seasons cancelled due to COVID-19 pandemic				
2021	WWCFL	Western	Seasons cancelled due to COVID-19 pandemic				
2022	WWCFL	Western	3	1	2nd	Lost Semifinal, 52–0 vs. Saskatoon Valkyries	
2023	WWCFL	Western	2	1	2nd	Forfeit Western Conference Final vs. Calgary Rage	
2024	WWCFL	Western	–	–	—	Did not play	
Totals (2011–2023)			32	10			

== IFAF competitors ==
The following lists women from the Edmonton Storm who have competed in the IFAF Women's World Championship as members of Team Canada.

2010	2017	2022
Shirley Benson; Lindsay Ertman; Christina Goulet; Karin 'Kiki' Simmons; Terry Yahnke	Tanya Henderson; Sanderina Twin; Emma Goldsney; Aria McGowan (reserve)	Samantha Big Swallow (reserve); Brenna Bouchard (reserve); Baylie Kennedy (reserve)

== See also ==
- Women's gridiron football
