= Calgary Rage =

Canadian women's football team

Logo

General information
- Founded: 2009
- Stadium: Hellard at Shouldice Athletic Park
- Headquartered: Calgary, Alberta
- Colours
- Website: www.calgaryrage.ca

Personnel
- President: Nadine Goldade

League / conference affiliations
- WWCFL; Western

Championships
- Conference championships: 2; 2017, 2023

The Calgary Rage are a women's football team in the Western Women's Canadian Football League's (WWCFL) Western Conference. They are based in Calgary, Alberta.

== Team history ==
The team was first founded as the Calgary Rockies in 2009, and played exhibition games against the Edmonton Storm and Manitoba Fearless. In 2010, the Rockies, Storm, and the newly founded Lethbridge Steel joined together to form the Alberta Female Football League (AFFL), which played for one season. In 2011, the Rockies changed their name to the Calgary Rage, and the AFFL was absorbed by the WWCFL, which included the Fearless and new teams in Winnipeg, Regina, and Saskatoon. The WWCFL began play in 2011 with seven teams in two conferences, with the three Alberta-based teams competing in the Western Conference.

The Rage got off to a slow start, winning just six games in their first five seasons and getting eliminated by their rivals from Edmonton in the playoffs each year they qualified. They had a breakthrough season in 2017, posting an undefeated record through the regular season, finishing atop the Western Conference for the first time and proceeding all the way to the WWCFL Championship final, where they faced the Regina Riot. They lost the final by a score of 53–0. They were again eliminated from contention by the Riot in 2018 after the league adopted a cross-conference playoff format. The Rage posted a fourth consecutive winning season in 2019, but lost to the Steel in the first round of the playoffs.

The WWCFL cancelled its 2020 and 2021 seasons due to the COVID-19 pandemic. However, when play resumed in 2022, the Rage picked up where they left off and continued to post winning records. The team also changed its recruitment strategy, and consequently saw its roster grow from 25 players in 2022 to 43 in 2023. After being eliminated in the Semifinal in 2022 by the Fearless, the Rage posted their second undefeated season and made their second trip to the WWCFL Championship in 2023. They were again shut out in the title match, this time by the Saskatoon Valkyries.

== Year by year ==
= Indicates Division Title (regular season)

= Indicates Conference Title

= Indicates League Championship

Season	League	Conf	W	L	Conf. standing	Playoff result	Ref.
2011	WWCFL	Western	1	3	2nd	Lost Western Conference Final, 13–9 vs. Edmonton Storm	
2012	WWCFL	Western	1	3	2nd	Lost Quarterfinal, 34–13 vs. Edmonton Storm	
2013	WWCFL	Western	2	2	3rd	Did not qualify	
2014	WWCFL	Western	0	4	4th	Lost Quarterfinal, 47–0 vs. Edmonton Storm	
2015	WWCFL	Western	2	2	2nd	Lost Quarterfinal, 48–31 vs. Edmonton Storm	
2016	WWCFL	Western	3	1	2nd	Lost Quarterfinal, vs. Lethbridge Steel	
2017	WWCFL	Western	4	0	1st	Lost WWCFL Final, 53–0 vs. Regina Riot	
2018	WWCFL	Western	3	1	1st	Lost Semifinal, 45–6 vs. Regina Riot	
2019	WWCFL	Western	3	1	2nd	Lost Quarterfinal, 27–21 vs. Lethbridge Steel	
2020	WWCFL	Western	Seasons cancelled due to COVID-19 pandemic				
2021	WWCFL	Western	Seasons cancelled due to COVID-19 pandemic				
2022	WWCFL	Western	3	1	1st	Lost Semifinal, 15–6 vs. Manitoba Fearless	
2023	WWCFL	Western	3	0	1st	Lost WWCFL Final, 40–0 vs. Saskatoon Valkyries	
2024	WWCFL	Western	4	0	1st	Lost Semifinal, 29–0 vs. Regina Riot	
2025	WWCFL	Western	3	1	1st	Lost Semifinal, 6–0 vs. Edmonton Arctic Pride	
2026	WWCFL	Western	1	3	2nd	Lost Semifinal, 43–0 vs. Edmonton Arctic Pride	
Totals (2011–2026)			33	22			

== IFAF competitors ==
The following lists women from the Calgary Rage who have competed in the IFAF Women's World Championship as members of Team Canada.

2010	2013	2017	2022
Krista Michelle Wighton; Kora-Lea Hooker; Erin Walton	Annie Tremblay; Erin Walton	Lisa Gomes; Rebeckah Heninger; Alicia Wilson; Erin Walton (reserve)	Myranda Falardeau; Kendra Nash; Chantel Vogel; Emma Goldsney (reserve); Lisa Gomes (reserve); Patricia Jaworski (reserve); Jolene Goulard (reserve)

== Community involvement ==
Many Rage players volunteer as ushers at Calgary Stampeders home games. More players are getting involved with coaching around Calgary with different levels of programs ranging from pee-wee football to high school. On 1 September 2013, several members of the Rage roster participated in the Calgary Pride Parade.

== See also ==
- Women's gridiron football
