= Saskatchewan Selects =

- Nickname(s): SK Selects
- Founded: 1 May 2019; 5 years ago
- Stadium: SMF Field
- Capacity: 3,950
Home colours

The Saskatchewan Selects are an exhibition soccer team based on Saskatchewan that has played matches against other Canadian soccer teams. The team was created to establish a foundation for professional soccer in the province.

== History ==
In March 2019, the inaugural SK Summer Soccer Series was announced with a May 4 friendly to be played between a Saskatchewan Selects team and Calgary Foothills FC at Saskatoon Minor Football Field.

On May 1, 2019, representatives from the Saskatchewan Selects soccer team converged at the Park Town Hotel in Saskatoon to unveil the team’s roster, its new jerseys and a partnership with Prairieland Park.

Two matches against Canadian Premier League club FC Edmonton were scheduled for March, 2020. These matches were later cancelled due to the COVID-19 pandemic.

== SK Summer Soccer Series ==
Launched in 2019, the SK Summer Soccer Series is a series of matches staged in Saskatoon, SK featuring the SK Selects against professional soccer teams. The Series is an important project towards the development of a professional soccer club for Saskatchewan.

=== 2019 ===
May 4	Saskatchewan Selects	1–2	Calgary Foothills FC	Saskatoon, Saskatchewan
7:00 pm CDT				Stadium: SMF Field; Attendance: 3,067

July 25	Saskatchewan Selects	0–0 (a.e.t.) (6–7 p)	Vancouver Whitecaps FC U-23	Saskatoon, Saskatchewan
7:30 pm CDT				Stadium: SMF Field

August 11	Saskatchewan Selects	2–0	Toronto FC II	Saskatoon, Saskatchewan
3:00 pm CDT	Fraser; Baikas			Stadium: SMF Field; Attendance: 3,016

=== 2020 ===
March 28	Saskatchewan Selects	Cancelled	FC Edmonton	Saskatoon, Saskatchewan
7:00 pm CDT				Stadium: SaskTel Soccer Centre

March 29	Saskatchewan Selects	Cancelled	FC Edmonton	Saskatoon, Saskatchewan
6:00 pm CDT				Stadium: SaskTel Soccer Centre
