= James McCrae =

James McCrae may refer to:

- James McCrae (footballer) (1894–1974), Scottish football player and manager
- James McCrae (politician) (born 1948), Canadian politician
