= Ken Moore (Canadian football) =

Canadian football player (1925–2016)

Profile
- Position: Guard

Personal information
- Born: December 5, 1925; Calgary, Alberta, Canada
- Died: March 31, 2016 (aged 90); Calgary, Alberta, Canada
- Listed height: 6 ft 0 in (1.83 m)
- Listed weight: 215 lb (98 kg)

Career information
- University: Alberta

Career history
- 1946, 1951: Calgary Stampeders
- 1949–1950: Edmonton Eskimos

William Kenneth Moore (December 5, 1925 – March 31, 2016) was a Canadian professional football player who was a guard for the Edmonton Eskimos and Calgary Stampeders of the Canadian Football League (CFL). He also football at the University of Alberta. Moore was later a lawyer and judge in Alberta, serving on the Court of Queen's Bench as an associate justice from 1981 to 1984, and as chief justice from 1984 to 2000. Moore was a member of the board of directors for the Calgary bid committee for the 1988 Winter Olympics.
