= Clarke Stadium =

Stadium in Edmonton, Alberta, Canada

- Clarke Park
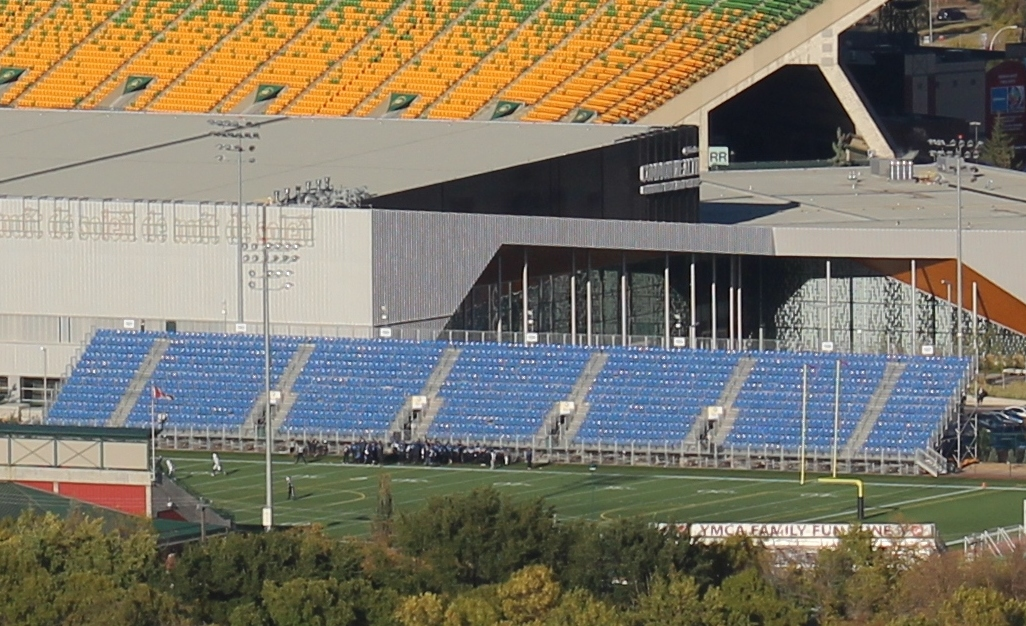
- Clarke Stadium with Commonwealth Stadium in the background
- Interactive map of Clarke Stadium
- Location: 11000 Stadium Road NW, Edmonton, Alberta
- Coordinates: 53°33′26″N 113°28′42″W
- Owner: City of Edmonton
- Capacity: 2,040 (1938); 20,667 (1954); 26,167 (1961); 1,200 (2001–2013); 5,000 (2013–2019); 5,148 (2019–2026); 6,000 (2026–present)
- Surface: Grass (1938–2000); Artificial Turf (2000–present)
- Public transit: Stadium station

Construction
- Opened: 1938
- Renovated: 2001, 2013
- Cost: CA$7,000 ($149,273 in 2025 dollars)

Tenants
- FC Edmonton (NASL/CPL) (2012–2022); Edmonton Huskies (CJFL) (1954–present); Edmonton Wildcats (CJFL) (1948–2021); Edmonton Eskimos (CFL) (1949–1978); Edmonton Drillers (NASL) (1982); Edmonton Brick Men (CSL) (1987–1990); Edmonton Aviators (A-League) (2004); Edmonton Storm (WWCFL) (2004–2024); Edmonton Arctic Pride (WWCFL) (2025–present); MacEwan Griffins soccer (U Sports) (2018–present)

Website
- https://www.edmonton.ca/attractions_events/clarke-stadium

Clarke Stadium is a multipurpose stadium located in Edmonton, Alberta, Canada. The stadium was originally built for Canadian football. Over the years different sports have been played at the site.

== History ==
The stadium was originally built in 1938, and named for Joseph Clarke, the mayor of Edmonton. It was built on land deeded to the city for the purpose of constructing public sports fields by the federal government (Prime Minister Mackenzie King was a personal friend of Clarke). The original Clarke Stadium accommodated approximately 20,000 fans in the spartan conditions consistent with its era. The seating area consisted of two grandstands on opposing sidelines. Some end-zone stands were added years later. The stadium hosted the Edmonton Eskimos (now Elks) of the Western Interprovincial Football Union/Canadian Football League from 1949 to 1978. In the 1960s and 1970s, the stadium sold Knothole Gang tickets for 25 cents per game.

In 1978, the Eskimos moved to Commonwealth Stadium, which had been built adjacent to Clarke Stadium in preparation for the 1978 Commonwealth Games. Clarke Stadium was used for local and minor league sporting events after the departure of the football team.

The Edmonton Elks scheduled a preseason game at Clarke Stadium versus the Calgary Stampeders on May 29, 2026, due to a 2026 FIFA World Cup exhibition game held at Commonwealth Stadium. This was the first time since 1978 that the stadium hosted a professional football game.

== Remodelling ==
The facility was almost completely demolished on June 1, 2000, and rebuilt as a 'secondary' stadium for events of the 2001 World Championships in Athletics hosted in Edmonton. It was redesigned with approximately 1,200 seats in a single grandstand. The original grass playing surface was also replaced with artificial turf to allow for greater usage as part of the facility upgrade. The stadium is currently used for university, minor and intramural sports. Clarke Park, as the remodelled stadium is often known, is also used for concerts and other events. Including the playing surface, the capacity of the stadium grounds can exceed 6,000 for concerts and non-sporting events.

== Soccer ==
The Edmonton Drillers of the 1970s and the Edmonton Aviators of 2004 both attempted to draw crowds to the much larger Commonwealth Stadium before moving to Clarke Stadium when they were unable to fill Commonwealth or turn a profit. In both cases, the move to Clarke Stadium was followed closely by the team folding.

The Edmonton Brick Men of the 1980s and 1990s also played at the stadium but played most matches at John Ducey Park, which was primarily a baseball diamond.

FC Edmonton began playing their North American Soccer League home games at Clarke Stadium with the 2012 season. In May 2013, construction was completed to expand the stadium's capacity to 5,000, using temporary seating. In August 2013, NASL Commissioner Bill Peterson and representatives of FC Edmonton met with officials of the City of Edmonton to discuss the installation of artificial turf, as the final step in converting the facility into a more soccer-specific stadium, while still allowing for other use. The conversion of the turf was completed in time for the 2014 season. The stadium was further renovated in advance of the 2019 CPL season, with seating increased to 5,148 and the block of temporary stands from 2013 removed in favour of permanent seating, with stands now added behind both goals along with pitch side tables beside both teams dugouts.

== See also ==
- List of Canadian Premier League stadiums
