= Al Anderson (Canadian football) =

Canadian football administrator

Personal information
- Born: c. 1914
- Died: January 15, 1994 (aged 79); Edmonton, Alberta, Canada

Career history
- 1947–1956: Edmonton Eskimos

Awards and highlights
- 3× Grey Cup champion (1954, 1955, 1956)

Albert James Anderson (c. 1914 – January 15, 1994) was a Canadian professional football administrator who was general manager of the Edmonton Eskimos from 1947 to 1956. He won three Grey Cups with them in 1954, 1955 and 1956. Anderson later worked with the Edmonton Exhibition Association and Northlands.
