= Dimitri Goloubef =

Canadian football player (1923–1997)

Profile
- Position: End

Personal information
- Born: 1923
- Died: 1997 (aged 73–74)
- Listed height: 6 ft 2 in (1.88 m)
- Listed weight: 197 lb (89 kg)

Career history
- 1949–1951: Edmonton Eskimos

Dimitri Goloubef (1923–1997) was a Canadian professional football player who played for the Edmonton Eskimos. He previously played football at the University of British Columbia or Simon Fraser University.
