= John Dlugos =

Canadian football player (1928–2018)

Profile
- Position: Offensive tackle

Personal information
- Born: July 26, 1928; Saskatoon, Saskatchewan
- Died: April 10, 2018 (aged 89); Victoria, British Columbia
- Listed height: 6 ft 0 in (1.83 m)
- Listed weight: 202 lb (92 kg)

Career history
- 1949–1951: Edmonton Eskimos

John Dlugos (July 26, 1928 – April 10, 2018) was a Canadian professional football player who played for the Edmonton Eskimos from 1949 to 1951. He played junior football for the Saskatoon Hilltops. He died in Victoria, British Columbia.
