= Nick Albert =

American gridiron football player

Profile
- Position: Guard

Personal information
- Born: c. 1918; New Castle, Pennsylvania, USA
- Died: June 12, 1985; Edmonton, Alberta, Canada
- Listed height: 5 ft 9 in (1.75 m)
- Listed weight: 210 lb (95 kg)

Career information
- College: Tulsa

Career history
- 1949: Edmonton Eskimos

Nicholas Albert (born c. 1918) was a Canadian football guard who played for the Edmonton Eskimos of the Canadian Football League in 1949. He played in four regular season games. He later became a professional wrestler.
