= Jim Macrae =

Canadian football player (1926-unknown)

Profile
- Position: Halfback

Personal information
- Born: February 24, 1926; Langham, Saskatchewan, Canada
- Died: November 5, 1993 (aged 67); Lloydminster, Saskatchewan, Canada
- Listed height: 6 ft 0 in (1.83 m)
- Listed weight: 175 lb (79 kg)

Career history
- 1949–1951: Edmonton Eskimos

James Arnold Macrae (b. February 24, 1926 - d. November 5, 1993) was a Canadian professional football player who played for the Edmonton Eskimos. He was later a lawyer, graduating with a law degree from the University of Alberta in 1950 where he played for the University of Alberta Golden Bears with future Premier Peter Lougheed.
