= Regina Riot (football) =

Women's football team

Logo

General information
- Founded: 2011
- Stadium: Leibel Field at Mosaic Stadium
- Headquartered: Regina, Saskatchewan
- Colours
- Mascot: "Roxy"
- Website: www.reginariotfootball.com

Personnel
- General manager: Chantal Ounsworth
- Head coach: Claire Doré

League / conference affiliations
- WWCFL; Prairie Division

Championships
- League championships: 3; 2015, 2017, 2018
- Conference titles: 5; 2015, 2017, 2018, 2019, 2024

The Regina Riot are a women's football team in the Western Women's Canadian Football League's (WWCFL) Prairie Conference. The team is based in Regina, Saskatchewan. Their provincial rivals are the Saskatoon Valkyries. The Riot and Valkyries have dominated the WWCFL since play began in 2011 as the only two teams to win the league championship.

== Team history ==
The Riot were established as a member of the Western Women's Canadian Football League (WWCFL) ahead of its inaugural 2011 season, joining the Saskatoon Valkyries as one of two teams from Saskatchewan. The league also boasted teams in Alberta and Manitoba.

In their first two seasons of play, the Riot's only losses were to the Valkyries, but this left them with 2–2 records each season and with losses in the Prairie Conference final. In the 2013 season, the Riot finally got the best of the Valkyries, handing the Saskatoon team their first ever defeat with a 15–7 decision in Regina on 12 May. This led to Regina finishing the regular season atop the Prairie Conference standings for the first time. However, that loss would be avenged by the Valkyries in the Prairie Conference final, as the Riot lost the playoff re-match 55–27 in Regina.

The 2015 season was a break-out year for the Riot. They became the first team to defeat the Valkyries in Saskatoon with a decisive 49–9 victory on 30 May. They finished the season at the top of the Prairie Conference and defeated the Valkyries in the playoffs for the first time with a 31–29 victory in the Conference final. The Riot then advanced to their first WWCFL championship match, where they defeated the Edmonton Storm 53–6 in Winnipeg to win their first title.

After falling to the Valkyries in a conference final re-match in 2016, the Riot returned to the championship match in 2017 with a 34–24 victory over the Valkyries. This time they faced the Calgary Rage in the final, and they earned a decisive 53–0 victory to claim their second title in three seasons. The Riot continued to improve in 2018 as the team posted its first undefeated season, defeating the Valkyries twice in the regular season for the first time. Prior to their Conference Final match against the Edmonton Storm, the Riot had their uniforms stolen; the junior men's Regina Thunder lent the Riot jerseys for their match. The Riot also faced Saskatoon in the Championship final for the first time, and a 14–10 victory secured back-to-back titles for Regina, and their first one at home.

The 2019 season saw the Riot lose to a team other than the Valkyries for the first time. On 5 May, they lost to the Manitoba Fearless at home by a score of 34–9. This resulted in the Riot finishing outside the top two in the Prairie Conference for the first time. However, the Riot rebounded to return to the Championship final for the third straight season and the fourth time in five seasons, defeating the Edmonton Storm 30–8 in the Conference final. They fell short in the final, losing to the Valkyries 25–3.

The COVID-19 pandemic led to the cancellation of both the 2020 and 2021 WWCFL seasons. However, the Riot played a series of exhibition games against the Valkyries in the summer of 2021. The Valkyries swept the three-game series, defeating the Riot by scores of 34–0, 42–7, and 32–7.

When league play resumed in 2022, the Riot lost for a second time to the Fearless and finished third in the Prairie Conference. They faced Manitoba again in the first round of the playoffs, and lost 20–13, meaning they would not make the Championship game for the first time since 2016. This was also the first season the Riot fell short of the Conference Final. In 2024, the Riot had their team jerseys stolen for a second time. They also advanced to the league championship final for the first time since 2019—they hosted the Valkyries, losing the title match by a score of 36–21.

The Riot welcomed their first female head coach, Claire Doré, ahead of the 2025 season. The 2025 season-opener against the Fearless was the first WWCFL game to feature two female head coaches in Doré and Fearless co-head coach Andrea Buckland.

== Year by year ==
= Indicates Division Title (regular season)

= Indicates Conference Title

= Indicates League Championship

Season	League	Conf.	W	L	Conf. standing	Playoff result
2011	WWCFL	Prairie	2	2	2nd	Lost Prairie Final, 36–6 vs. Saskatoon Valkyries
2012	WWCFL	Prairie	2	2	2nd	Lost Prairie Final, 35–21 vs. Saskatoon Valkyries
2013	WWCFL	Prairie	3	1	1st	Lost Prairie Final, 55–27 vs. Saskatoon Valkyries
2014	WWCFL	Prairie	2	2	2nd	Lost Prairie Final, 44–15 vs. Saskatoon Valkyries
2015	WWCFL	Prairie	3	1	1st	Won WWCFL Final, 53–6 vs. Edmonton Storm
2016	WWCFL	Prairie	3	1	2nd	Lost Prairie Final, 29–17 vs. Saskatoon Valkyries
2017	WWCFL	Prairie	3	1	1st	Won WWCFL Final, 53–0 vs. Calgary Rage
2018	WWCFL	Prairie	4	0	1st	Won WWCFL Final, 14–10 vs. Saskatoon Valkyries
2019	WWCFL	Prairie	1	3	3rd	Lost WWCFL Final, 25–3 vs. Saskatoon Valkyries
2020	WWCFL	Prairie	Seasons cancelled due to COVID-19 pandemic			
2021	WWCFL	Prairie	Seasons cancelled due to COVID-19 pandemic			
2022	WWCFL	Prairie	1	3	3rd	Lost Conference Semifinal, 20–13 vs. Manitoba Fearless
2023	WWCFL	Prairie	2	2	2nd	Lost Prairie Final, 19–9 vs. Saskatoon Valkyries
2024	WWCFL	Prairie	2	2	2nd	Lost WWCFL Final, 36–21 vs. Saskatoon Valkyries
2025	WWCFL	Prairie	1	3	3rd	Lost Prairie Final, 9–0 vs. Saskatoon Valkyries
2026	WWCFL	Prairie	0	4	3rd	Lost Conference Semifinal, 25–9, vs. Manitoba Fearless
Totals (2011–2026)			29	27		

== Management ==
=== Head coaches ===
- Jon Baxter (2011–2012)
- Darren Fisher (2013–2014)
- Shawn McCall (2015–2016)
- Olivier Eddie (2017–2018)
- Morgan Bunce (2019)
- Kris Hadesbeck (2019–2024)
- Claire Doré (2025–Present)

=== General managers ===
- Melissa Park (2011–2013)
- Alicia Dorwart
- Chantal Ounsworth

== IFAF competitors ==
The following lists athletes and staff from the Regina Riot that competed in the IFAF Women's World Championships as members of Team Canada.

2013	2017	2022
Ciara Bray; Claire Dore; Emma Hicks; Aimee Kowalski; Mallory Starkey; Becky Wallis; Adrienne Zuck; Olivier Eddie (coach)	Carmen Agar; Emilie Belanger; Claire Dore; Katie Hungle; Artemis Kouropoulou; Aimee Kowalski; Alex Kowalski; Ashley Viklund; Adrienne Zuck; Celeste Schnell (reserve); Mallory Starkey (reserve); Olivier Eddie (coach)	Rebekah Koutsogiannopolous; Alex Kowalski; Kasey McCombs; Quinn Petrinchuk; Hailee Raffey; Shanelle Rioux; Rae-Lynn Schaffer; Chris Andrews (reserve)

== Community involvement ==
The Riot received the YWCA Women of Distinction Award - Circle of Friends in 2013 in recognition of their involvement in the Regina community. This included running and assisting with community football and sport programs, as well as programs like Athletes Against Bullying and the Regina Ovarian Cancer Society.

== See also ==
- Women's gridiron football
