= Harry Irving (Canadian football) =

Canadian football player (1927–2006)

Profile
- Position: Halfback

Personal information
- Born: March 4, 1927; Calgary, Alberta, Canada
- Died: May 22, 2006 (aged 79); Calgary, Alberta, Canada
- Listed height: 5 ft 11 in (1.80 m)
- Listed weight: 170 lb (77 kg)

Career information
- University: Alberta

Career history
- 1948: Calgary Stampeders
- 1949: Edmonton Eskimos

Awards and highlights
- Grey Cup champion (1948)

Harold Alexander Irving (March 4, 1927 – May 22, 2006) was a Canadian professional football player who played for the Calgary Stampeders and Edmonton Eskimos.

== Biography ==
Harry Irving played junior football with future Premier Peter Lougheed with the Calgary Tornadoes.

Irving previously attended and played football for the University of Alberta Golden Bears and hockey for the McGill University Redmen.

He won the Grey Cup with the Stampeders in 1948.

He died of Alzheimer's disease in 2006.
