= Manitoba Fearless =

Logo

General information
- Founded: 2008
- Stadium: St. Vital Mustangs Field
- Headquartered: Winnipeg, Manitoba
- Colours
- Website: www.manitobafearless.com

Personnel
- General manager: Lisa Thomas
- Head coach: Andrea Buckland (Co); Craig Bachynski (Co)

League / conference affiliations
- WWCFL; Prairie

Championships
- Conference titles: 1; 2022

The Manitoba Fearless are a women's football team in the Western Women's Canadian Football League's (WWCFL) Prairie Conference. The team is based in Winnipeg, Manitoba. Founded in 2008, it is the longest running Winnipeg-based women's tackle football team.

Three members of the Fearless were part of the inaugural WWCFL board. Together, Fearless founder Tannis Wilson and GM Lisa Cummings founded the Manitoba Girls Football Association.

== Team history ==
The Fearless were founded in Winnipeg in 2008. Founder Tannis Wilson had traveled to Alberta after a women's team was founded in Calgary, and returned to Winnipeg with the goal of founding a club there. The Fearless spent several years traveling to play exhibition matches against teams in Alberta, as well as against the Minnesota Vixen. They also invited teams to play in Winnipeg and played some of their games in Brandon, Manitoba. In 2011, the Fearless became a charter member of the WWCFL, joining the Prairie Conference along with three new teams: The Winnipeg Wolfpack, the Saskatoon Valkyries, and the Regina Riot. Wilson was instrumental in the formation of the new league, and served as its first commissioner.

The close proximity of the new Wolfpack team ensured the creation of a lasting rivalry between the two Winnipeg-based teams, but both found themselves consistently at the bottom of the Prairie Conference standings as the Valkyries and Riot dominated the new league. In the inaugural season, the Fearless opted to forfeit their first-round playoff match against the Riot. The Valkyries won the first four WWCFL championships before the Riot won their first in 2015, the two Saskatchewan-based teams losing only to each other. The Fearless came close to breaking through in the 2018 playoffs when they lost a tight quarterfinal match to Saskatoon by a score of 16–13. A breakthrough finally came in 2019 when the Fearless were able to defeat the Riot 34–9 in Regina on 5 May. It was Manitoba's first win over Regina in ten tries. The win helped Manitoba finish 2nd in the Prairie Conference standings for the first time; however, they lost a re-match to Regina in the playoff Quarterfinals.

The progress of the Fearless was put on hold for two years as the WWCFL cancelled both the 2020 and 2021 seasons due to the COVID-19 pandemic. However, the Fearless took a major step when the league resumed play in 2022. They again beat Regina during the regular season and finished 2nd in the Prairie Conference. This time, they managed to get past Regina in the playoffs, defeating the Riot 20–13. They went on to advance to their first WWCFL championship game. In the final, they lost to the Valkyries by a score of 36–6. In 2025, the Fearless absorbed a number of former Wolfpack players after their cross-town rivals ceased operations. The 2025 season-opener against the Riot was the first WWCFL game to feature two female head-coaches in Regina's Claire Doré and Fearless co-head coach Andera Buckland. The 2026 season saw the Fearless defeat the Riot three times, including in the playoffs, before losing the Semifinal to the Valkyries.

== Year by year ==
= Indicates Division Title (regular season)

= Indicates Conference Title

= Indicates League Championship

Season	League	Conf.	W	L	Conf. standing	Playoff result	Ref.
2011	WWCFL	Prairie	2	2	3rd	Forfeit Conference Semifinal vs. Regina Riot	
2012	WWCFL	Prairie	1	3	4th	Lost Prairie Conference Semifinal, 56–0 vs. Saskatoon Valkyries	
2013	WWCFL	Prairie	0	4	4th	Did not qualify	
2014	WWCFL	Prairie	0	4	4th	Lost Prairie Conference Semifinal, 48–6 vs. Saskatoon Valkyries	
2015	WWCFL	Prairie	0	4	4th	Lost Prairie Conference Semifinal, vs. 73–0 Regina Riot	
2016	WWCFL	Prairie	1	3	4th	Lost Prairie Conference Semifinal, 42–2 vs. Saskatoon Valkyries	
2017	WWCFL	Prairie	1	3	4th	Did not qualify	
2018	WWCFL	Prairie	2	2	3rd	Lost Quarterfinal, 16–13 vs. Saskatoon Valkyries	
2019	WWCFL	Prairie	3	1	2nd	Lost Quarterfinal, 13–9 vs. Regina Riot	
2020	WWCFL	Prairie	Seasons cancelled due to COVID-19 pandemic				
2021	WWCFL	Prairie	Seasons cancelled due to COVID-19 pandemic				
2022	WWCFL	Prairie	3	1	2nd	Lost WWCFL Final, 36–6 vs. Saskatoon Valkyries	
2023	WWCFL	Prairie	2	2	3rd	Lost Quarterfinal, 26–13 vs. Regina Riot	
2024	WWCFL	Prairie	0	4	3rd	Lost Semifinal, 48–14 vs. Saskatoon Valkyries	
2025	WWCFL	Prairie	1	3	3rd	Lost Semifinal, 22–8 vs. Regina Riot	
2026	WWCFL	Prairie	2	2	2nd	Lost Semifinal, 17–7 vs. Saskatoon Valkyries	
Totals (2011–2026)			18	38			

== IFAF competitors ==
The following lists women from the Manitoba Fearless who have competed in the IFAF Women's World Championship as members of Team Canada.

2010	2013	2017	2022
Kathy Calancia; Patricia Eko-Davis; Jessica McCreary; Andrea Weichel; Carol Whitman	Roxanna Cox; Lisa Klaverkamp; Pauline Olynik	Alexa Matwyczuk; Amanda Myall	Andrea Backlund; Nicole Drouin; Brooklyn Dyce; Hallile Eggie; Nura Muhindo; Julie Sprague

== See also ==
- Women's gridiron football
