= Western Women's Canadian Football League =

Gridiron football league, founded 2011

Western Women's Canadian Football League (WWCFL)
- Sport: Canadian football
- Founded: 2011
- First season: 2011
- President: Jamie Lammerding
- Commissioner: Shawn Walter
- Divisions: Western Conference; Prairie Conference
- No. of teams: 6
- Country: Canada
- Most recent champion: Saskatoon Valkyries
- Most titles: Saskatoon Valkyries (11)
- Website: wwcfl.ca

The Western Women's Canadian Football League (WWCFL) is a full-contact women's Canadian football league which began play in the spring of 2011. The league plays an annual season in the spring and summer, and with six teams it is the largest women's football league in Canada. The teams play 12-woman tackle football games using the Football Canada rules, similar to those of the Canadian Football League. The league has teams in Manitoba, Saskatchewan, and Alberta.

== History ==
Women's tackle football began to grow in popularity across the Prairies in the early 21st century. Clubs were established in several Alberta cities and in Winnipeg before 2010, and teams would frequently travel to play each other. In 2010, the Edmonton Storm, Calgary Rockies, and Lethbridge Steel came together to form the Alberta Female Football League (AFFL), while the Manitoba Fearless traveled for exhibition matches against Alberta teams, as well as the Minnesota Vixen. When a women's football clinic in Saskatoon in 2010 consolidated interest in the sport in Saskatchewan, a Prairie women's league began to look feasible. The following year, the WWCFL was founded with seven teams across Alberta, Saskatchewan, and Manitoba. The league's first commissioner was Fearless co-founder Tannis Wilson, one of the central figures pushing for an inter-provincial league.

The WWCFL began play in 2011. Teams were divided into two conferences, with Alberta-based teams playing in the Western Conference and Saskatchewan- and Manitoba-based teams playing in the Prairie Conference, a structure that has remained intact. In the inaugural season, both the Edmonton Storm and Saskatoon Valkyries went undefeated in their conferences, posting 4–0 records. Both teams dispatched provincial rivals in their respective Conference finals, leading to a Championship match between the Storm and the Valkyries, played in Lethbridge. The Valkyries won the title with a 35–7 victory, becoming the first WWCFL champions.

The Valkyries quickly established themselves as a WWCFL dynasty, winning the first four WWCFL championships and losing only one game along the way. They defeated the Lethbridge Steel in the championship final in three consecutive seasons from 2012 to 2014.

Two new Alberta-based teams joined the league in 2013. The Northern Anarchy began play out of Grande Prairie, Alberta, and the Okotoks Lady Outlawz began play out of Okotoks, Alberta. Although the league considered expansion to British Columbia, the two new teams struggled to become firmly established. The Outlawz suspended operations in 2014; the Anarchy paused operations in 2015, returned to play in 2016, and suspended operations again in 2020. This left the league with its original seven clubs.

The Regina Riot were the first team to beat the Valkyries, and the first team besides the Valkyries to win the league championship, winning the title in 2015 with a 53–6 victory over Edmonton in the championship final, played in Winnipeg. Regina established its own run of dominance, advancing to the championship final four times in five seasons from 2015 to 2019 and winning three titles in the process.

It was not until 2019 that either the Valkyries or the Riot lost a game to a team from outside of Saskatchewan, when the Manitoba Fearless defeated the Riot 34–9 in Regina on 5 May 2019. The Fearless made another breakthrough in 2022 when they defeated the Riot in the first round of the playoffs with a 20–13 victory. They went on to lose their first Championship final to Saskatoon.

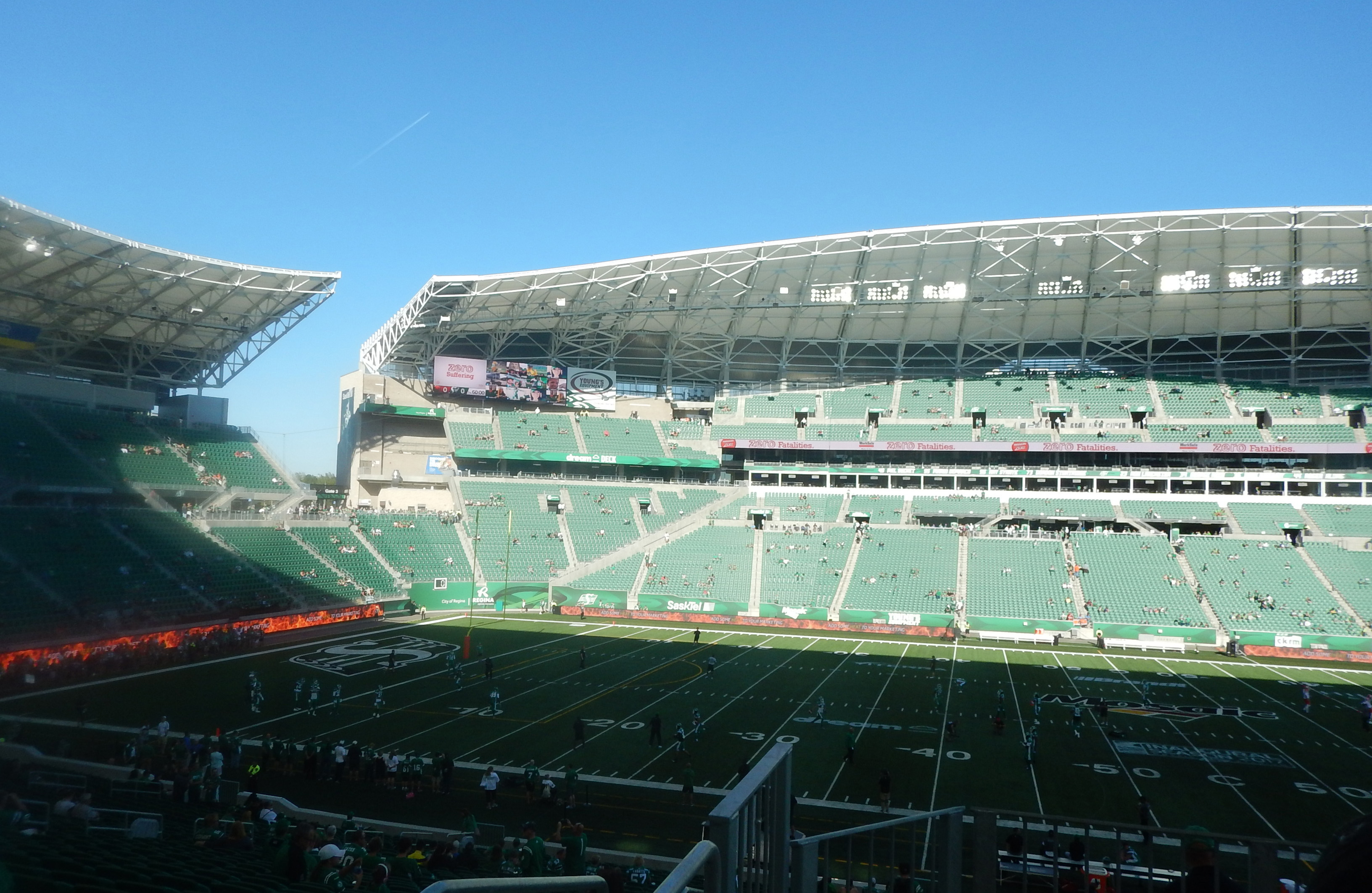
Mosaic Stadium has hosted two WWCFL championship games, in 2018 and 2019

The WWCFL cancelled both the 2020 and 2021 seasons due to the COVID-19 pandemic, although some teams managed to organize exhibition games in 2021. This delayed celebrations of the league's 10th anniversary, which was marked in 2022 when the league returned to full play. The league encountered struggles with stability after returning to play, and both Edmonton and Winnipeg paused operations ahead of the 2024 season. Coming out of the pandemic, the Valkyries established a second dynastic run of success, winning another five consecutive titles—adding to one prior to the pandemic in 2019 for a total of six straight—without losing a single game.

== Rules, structure, and philosophy ==
The WWCFL follows Football Canada's Canadian Amateur Rule Book for Tackle Football, drawing on the same rules as men's leagues. A 2014 study noted that this avoided the "ghettoization" of the women's league through stripping down the rules. The WWCFL has also consequently been able to draw upon support and resources from men's football. Founding Commissioner Tannis Wilson said, "It's an old boys club out there. You can’t let those guys push you around, but there is a lot of support for the women’s programs once people find out about us. They want their daughters to follow in dad’s footsteps.”

The league is divided into two conferences that play four-game intra-conference regular seasons before a three-round playoff that culminates in the WWCFL title game.

Early in its existence, the WWCFL was contrasted with the then-Lingerie Football League (LFL), which expanded into Canada in 2012, including teams in Saskatoon and Regina and plans for a team in Calgary. The LFL was frequently criticized for devaluing women's football, and the WWCFL offered an alternative focused fully on the sport. In 2012 Wilson said, "I'd say if you want to see real women play real football, come out and watch the WWCFL."

The league operates as a non-profit organization with a decentralized and democratic power structure, with a league board of elected members that includes representatives of each team.

Athletes in the WWCFL are unpaid and the league relies on extensive volunteer labour at the club and league level, along with fundraising. It has not been uncommon for league executives to play, manage, or coach clubs in the league. For example, Jaime Lammerding played for the Saskatoon Valkyries from 2011 to 2022 while also serving as league president, and WWCFL commissioner Shawn Walter took over as head coach of the Edmonton Storm in 2022.

== Teams ==
Team	Location	Founded	Home Field	Conf. titles	League titles
Western Conference
Edmonton Arctic Pride	Edmonton, AB	2025	Clarke Stadium	2	0
Calgary Rage	Calgary, AB	2009	Shouldice Athletic Park	2	0
Lethbridge Steel	Lethbridge, AB	2010	University of Lethbridge Community Stadium	3	0
Prairie Conference
Saskatoon Valkyries	Saskatoon, SK	2010	Saskatoon Minor Football Field / Griffiths Stadium	11	11
Regina Riot	Regina, SK	2011	Leibel Field / Mosaic Stadium	5	3
Manitoba Fearless	Winnipeg, MB	2008	St. Vital Mustangs Field	0	0
Former teams				Years active	
Edmonton Storm	Edmonton, AB		Clarke Stadium	2004–2023	
Northern Anarchy	Grande Prairie, AB		Legion Field	2013–2020	
Okotoks Lady Outlawz	High River, AB		High River High Field	2013–2014	
Winnipeg Wolfpack	Winnipeg, MB		North Winnipeg Nomads Football Club	2011–2023	

Western Conference Prairie Conference

== Championship results ==
Year	Champion	Runner-up	Score	Location	Ref
2011	Saskatoon Valkyries	Edmonton Storm	35–7	Lethbridge	
2012	Saskatoon Valkyries	Lethbridge Steel	64–21	Saskatoon	
2013	Saskatoon Valkyries	Lethbridge Steel	27–13	Taylor Field, Regina	
2014	Saskatoon Valkyries	Lethbridge Steel	53–0	Saskatoon	
2015	Regina Riot	Edmonton Storm	53–6	Winnipeg	
2016	Saskatoon Valkyries	Edmonton Storm	81–6	Lethbridge	
2017	Regina Riot	Calgary Rage	53–0	Saskatoon	
2018	Regina Riot	Saskatoon Valkyries	14–10	Mosaic Stadium, Regina	
2019	Saskatoon Valkyries	Regina Riot	25–3	Mosaic Stadium, Regina	
2020	Seasons cancelled due to COVID-19 pandemic				
2021	Seasons cancelled due to COVID-19 pandemic				
2022	Saskatoon Valkyries	Manitoba Fearless	36–6	Saskatoon	
2023	Saskatoon Valkyries	Calgary Rage	40–0	Saskatoon	
2024	Saskatoon Valkyries	Regina Riot	36–21	Leibel Field, Regina	
2025	Saskatoon Valkyries	Edmonton Arctic Pride	28–0	Commonwealth, Edmonton	
2026	Saskatoon Valkyries	Edmonton Arctic Pride	40–7	Saskatoon	

== See also ==
- Women's gridiron football
- List of gridiron football teams in Canada
- List of leagues of American football
