= Saskatoon Valkyries =

Logo

General information
- Founded: 2010
- Stadium: Saskatoon Minor Football Field, Griffiths Stadium
- Headquartered: Saskatoon, Saskatchewan
- Colours
- Website: www.saskatoonvalkyries.com

Personnel
- General manager: Michelle Duchene
- Head coach: Pat Barry

Nickname
- Valks

League / conference affiliations
- WWCFL; Prairie Division

Championships
- League championships: 11; 2011, 2012, 2013, 2014, 2016, 2019, 2022, 2023, 2024, 2025, 2026
- Conference titles: 11; 2011, 2012, 2013, 2014, 2016, 2018, 2022, 2023, 2024, 2025, 2026

The Saskatoon Valkyries are a women's Canadian football team in the Western Women's Canadian Football League's (WWCFL) Prairie Conference. The team is based in Saskatoon, Saskatchewan. They are the most successful WWCFL team, winning eleven of the leagues fourteen championships since play began in 2011, including the first four. Their primary rivals are the Regina Riot, the only other WWCFL team to win the championship.

== Team history ==
The Valkyries were founded in 2010 after a Football Saskatchewan women's football clinic in Saskatoon consolidated interest among players and management. Co-founder Michelle Duchene had her own interest piqued after working as a trainer for the women's national team at the 2010 world championships. The Saskatoon team was founded in time to join the new Western Women's Canadian Football League (WWCFL), and after a fan submission contest Valkyries was chosen as the team name.

=== Early success ===
The WWCFL began play in 2011 with seven teams in Alberta, Saskatchewan, and Manitoba. The Valkyries had a dominant inaugural season, posting a 4-0 record and advancing to the league championship final by defeating their provincial rival Regina Riot 36–6 in the Prairie Conference final. In the championship match, the Valkyries defeated the Edmonton Storm 35–7 to become the first WWCFL champions.

The Valkyries again posted a perfect record in 2012, and advanced to the championship match with a chance to defend their title against the Lethbridge Steel, who also advanced to the final undefeated. The Valkyries defeated the Steel 64–21 in Saskatoon to claim their second consecutive championship.

The 2013 season saw the Valkyries lose a game for the first time in team history, dropping a 15–7 decision to the Regina Riot on 12 May. This led to both teams finishing with a 3-1 record and the Riot finishing first in the Prairie Conference based on point differential. The Valkyries rebounded from their regular season loss to win their first conference post-season road game, defeating the Riot 55–27 in Regina to advance to their third consecutive WWCFL final. In the final, Saskatoon defeated the Lethbridge Steel 27–13 in Regina to claim their third consecutive title.

The Valkyries returned to undefeated status in 2014, advancing to a fourth consecutive championship match and a third straight against Lethbridge. They capped a dominant season with a 53–0 victory over the Steel to claim their fourth championship. After the match, veteran quarterback Candace Bloomquist, who had been with the team since its inception, announced her retirement.

The 2015 season ended the Valkyries four-year run as the undisputed champions of the WWCFL. The Valkyries lost at home for the first time in team history on 30 May, falling 49–9 to the Riot. As in 2013, this resulted in Saskatoon finishing second in the Prairie Conference. Unlike in 2013, the Valkyries fell to the Riot in the Conference final, 31–29, failing to advance to the championship game for the first time. The Riot went on to win the title.

The Valkyries bounced back in the 2016 season. Although they again dropped a regular season game to the Riot, losing the season finale 27–26, Saskatoon finished atop the Prairie Conference based on point differential. They defeated Regina 29–14 in the Conference final, setting up a meeting with Edmonton in the championship game. Saskatoon dominated the title match, defeating the Storm 81–6 in Lethbridge to claim a fifth championship in six seasons. Head coach and president Jeff Yausie called the 2016 team the best Valkyries team he had coached.

=== Coaching change ===
Before the 2017 season, the Valkyries announced that Yausie had resigned as head coach of the team after six seasons to take a position with the junior Saskatoon Hilltops. Yausie stated that it was "time for someone else to take the reign," and defensive coach Pat Barry, who had been with the team for three seasons since 2014, was announced as the new head coach. After a 3–1 season, the Valkyries fell to the Riot 34–24 in the Prairie final, in what was the last football match at Regina's Taylor Field.

The Valkyries finished the 2018 season with a 2–2 record, losing both of their matches against the Riot and thus losing more than one match for the first time in team history. The WWCFL also experimented with a cross-conference playoff structure, which resulted in the Valkyries facing off against the Calgary Rage in Calgary for their semi-final playoff match. The Valkyries defeated the Rage 30–6, becoming Western division champions and setting up the first WWCFL final between Saskatoon and Regina. Although the Valkyries held a 10–0 lead in the first quarter, the Riot came back to win the game 14–10.

=== Return to dominance ===
Prior to the start of the 2019 season, the Valkyries organized an exhibition game in Las Vegas, where they defeated the Sin City Trojans 34–6. They went on to post their first undefeated season since 2014. However, on 1 June, one day prior to their final regular season game, the team's defensive line coach, Justin Filteau, died in a plane crash. The Valkyries dedicated their season to Filteau, and went on to avenge their 2018 Finals loss to the Riot, defeating them 25–3 to claim their first championship since 2016. After the final, the Valkyries played another exhibition game, defeating the Montreal Blitz 39–12 in Saskatoon.

The COVID-19 pandemic led to the cancellation of both the 2020 and 2021 WWCFL seasons. In the fall of 2020, Valkyries linebacker Emmarae Dale became the first female player to join the men's Canadian Junior Football League with the Saskatoon Hilltops, which was touted as a sign of the progress of women's football. Despite the cancellation of the season, the Valkyries played a series of exhibition games against the Riot in the summer of 2021. The Valkyries swept the three-game series, defeating the Riot by scores of 34–0, 42–7, and 32–7.

The WWCFL returned for the 2022 season, with the Valkyries the defending champions. On 28 May, the Valkyries celebrated their 10-year anniversary, which had been delayed due to the cancellation of the two previous seasons. Saskatoon posted another undefeated season and advanced to the championship game with a 52–0 semi-final victory over Edmonton. In the final, they faced the Manitoba Fearless for the first time, and successfully defended their title, winning a second consecutive championship with a 36–6 victory in Saskatoon. The championship game was the final one for defensive tackle and WWCFL President Jaime Lammerding, an original Valkyrie.

The Valkyries capped off their 3rd consecutive and 8th overall championship by defeating the Calgary Rage 40–0 at Griffiths Stadium in Saskatoon on 24 June 2023. As of the end of the 2023 season, the Valkyries were on a 27-game winning streak. On 19 May 2024, the Valkyries claimed their 30th-consecutive victory. They finished the season with a 36–21 win over the Regina Riot in the championship game to secure their fourth straight title. In 2025, the Valkyries secured an unprecedented 5th consecutive title and extended their winning streak to 39 games, prevailing over the Edmonton Arctic Pride in the final. In 2026, the championship streak was extended to six titles with another undefeated season.

== Year by year ==
= Indicates Division Title (regular season)

= Indicates Conference Title

= Indicates League Championship

Season	League	Conf.	W	L	Conf. standing	Playoff result
2011	WWCFL	Prairie	4	0	1st	Won WWCFL Final, 35–7 vs. Edmonton Storm
2012	WWCFL	Prairie	4	0	1st	Won WWCFL Final, 64–21 vs. Lethbridge Steel
2013	WWCFL	Prairie	3	1	2nd	Won WWCFL Final, 27–13 vs. Lethbridge Steel
2014	WWCFL	Prairie	4	0	1st	Won WWCFL Final, 53–0 vs. Lethbridge Steel
2015	WWCFL	Prairie	3	1	2nd	Lost Prairie Final, 31–29 vs. Regina Riot
2016	WWCFL	Prairie	3	1	1st	Won WWCFL Final, 81–6 vs. Edmonton Storm
2017	WWCFL	Prairie	3	1	2nd	Lost Prairie Final, 34–24 vs. Regina Riot
2018	WWCFL	Prairie	2	2	2nd	Lost WWCFL Final, 14–10 vs. Regina Riot
2019	WWCFL	Prairie	4	0	1st	Won WWCFL Final, 25–3 vs. Regina Riot
2020	WWCFL	Prairie	Seasons cancelled due to COVID-19 pandemic			
2021	WWCFL	Prairie	Seasons cancelled due to COVID-19 pandemic			
2022	WWCFL	Prairie	4	0	1st	Won WWCFL Final, 36–6 vs. Manitoba Fearless
2023	WWCFL	Prairie	4	0	1st	Won WWCFL Final, 40–0 vs. Calgary Rage
2024	WWCFL	Prairie	4	0	1st	Won WWCFL Final, 36–21 vs. Regina Riot
2025	WWCFL	Prairie	4	0	1st	Won WWCFL Final, 28–0 vs. Edmonton Arctic Pride
2026	WWCFL	Prairie	4	0	1st	Won WWCFL Final, 40–7 vs. Edmonton Arctic Pride
Totals (2011–2026)			50	6		

== Management ==
=== Head coaches ===
- Jeff Yausie (2011–2016)
- Pat Barry (2016–present)

=== General managers ===
- Michelle Duchene (2011–present)

== IFAF competitors ==
The following lists women from the Saskatoon Valkyries who have competed in the IFAF Women's World Championship as members of Team Canada.

2010	2013	2017	2022
Jessie Buydens; Julie Paetsch	Jessie Buydens; Julie David; Marci Kiselyk; Jaime Lammerding; Darla Lee-Walde; Julie Paetsch; Carisa Polischuk; Elizabeth Thomson; Beth Thompson; Kendra Wilson	Shaylyn De Jong; Carly Dyck; Julene Friesen; Alyssa Funk; Marci Halseth; Jaime Lammerding; Samantha Matheson; Beth Thomson; Kendra Wilson (reserve); Rienna Rueve (reserve)	Emmarae Dale; Lauren Ferguson; Alyssa Funk; Haley Girolami; Danaye Holynski; Arden Kliewer; Beth LaLonde; Betsy Mawdsley; Ricki Obed; Reed Thorstad; Ashley Viklund; Sarah Wright; Sam Matheson (reserve)

== See also ==
- Women's gridiron football
