= Brittany Reinbolt =

American bobsledder (born 1984)

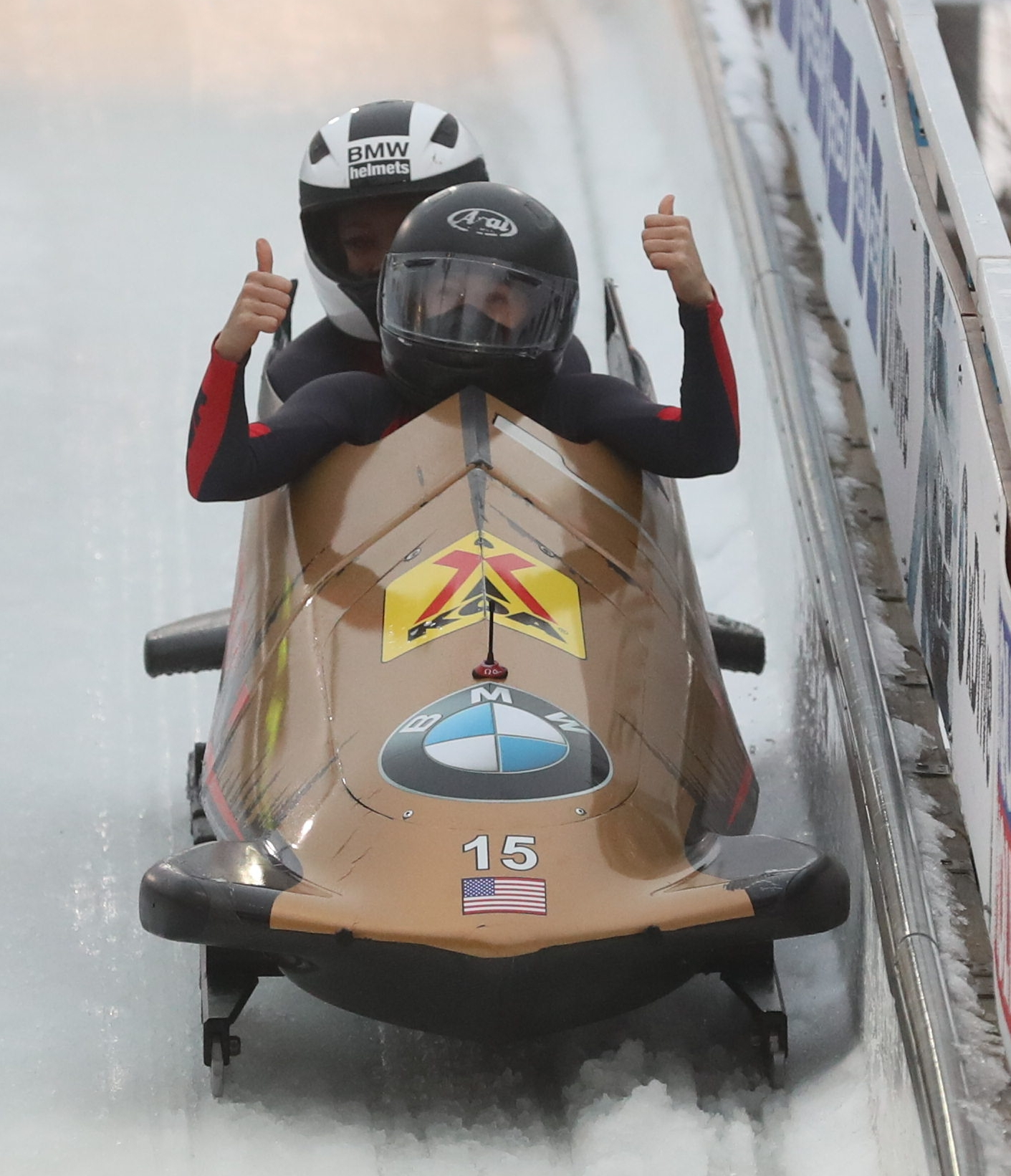

Personal information
- Born: April 12, 1984 (age 42)
- Height: 5 ft 6 in (168 cm)
- Weight: 150 lb (68 kg)

Sport
- Country: United States
- Sport: Bobsleigh
- Event: Two-woman
Medal record
Women's bobsledding
Representing United States
World Championships
Bronze medal – third place	2019 Whistler	Mixed team
Women's American football
Representing United States
IFAF Women's World Championship
Gold medal – first place	2010 Stockholm	Team

Brittany Reinbolt (born April 12, 1984) is an American bobsledder. She won a bronze medal at the IBSF World Championships 2019.

A native of Searcy, Arkansas, Reinbolt competed in track and field at Winona State University and won a gold medal with the United States women's national American football team at the 2010 IFAF Women's World Championship before she began bobsledding in 2011 after seeing it on television.
