= 2022 IFAF Women's World Championship =

2022 edition of the IFAF Women's World Championship

Tournament details
- Host nation: Finland
- Dates: July 30 – August 7
- No. of nations: 8
- Champions: United States (4th title)
- Runner-up: Great Britain
- Third-place: Finland

Tournament statistics
- Attendance: 6,519
- MVP of the tournament: (United States) Brittany Bushman

The 2022 IFAF Women's World Championship was the fourth IFAF Women's World Championship, an American football competition for women. It was held between July 30 and August 7, 2022, after originally having been planned for 2021. The tournament was hosted at Myyrmäen jalkapallostadion in Vantaa, Finland. The defending champion is the United States.

On the eve of the tournament, Mexico announced that they would not be able to make it to Finland for their first round game against Great Britain, putting their participation in the tournament in jeopardy. The next day Great Britain won their quarterfinal matchup with Mexico on walkover.

== Participating teams ==
| Team | Finals appearance | Last appearance | Best appearance |
|---|---|---|---|
| United States | 4th | 2017 | 1st (2010, 2013, 2017) |
| Canada | 4th | 2017 | 2nd (2010, 2013, 2017) |
| Mexico | 2nd | 2017 | 3rd (2017) |
| Finland | 4th | 2017 | 3rd (2010, 2013) |
| Sweden | 3rd | 2013 | 5th (2010, 2013) |
| Great Britain | 2nd | 2017 | 4th (2017) |
| Australia | 2nd | 2017 | 6th (2017) |
| Germany | 3rd | 2013 | 4th (2010, 2013) |

== Bracket ==
5th Place Game
8 | Germany | 0
3 | Mexico | 28
7th Place Game
5 | Sweden | 0
7 | Australia | 7

5th-8th Place Playoffs
8 | Germany | 6
5 | Sweden | 0
7 | Australia | 6
3 | Mexico | 34

Quarterfinals
1 | United States | 63
8 | Germany | 0
4 | Finland | 49
5 | Sweden | 0
2 | Canada | 33
7 | Australia | 6
3 | Mexico
6 | Great Britain | w/o

Semifinals
1 | United States | 28
4 | Finland | 10
2 | Canada | 13
6 | Great Britain | 20

Finals
1 | United States | 42
6 | Great Britain | 14
3rd Place Game
4 | Finland | 19
2 | Canada | 17

== Games ==
=== Gameday One ===
| Quarter | 1 | 2 | 3 | 4 | Total |
|---|---|---|---|---|---|
| Mexico | 0 | 0 | 0 | 0 | 0 |
| Great Britain | 0 | 0 | 0 | 0 | 0 |

at Myyrmäen jalkapallostadion, Vantaa

- Date: July 30
- Game time: 10:00
- Great Britain defeated Mexico on walkover, as Mexico failed to appear for the game.

| Quarter | 1 | 2 | 3 | 4 | Total |
|---|---|---|---|---|---|
| Canada | 6 | 14 | 3 | 10 | 33 |
| Australia | 6 | 0 | 0 | 0 | 6 |

at Myyrmäen jalkapallostadion, Vantaa

- Date: July 30
- Game time: 13:00
- Game attendance: 555
- Referee: Jessica Ringelstein, Germany
- The two teams started out scoring a touchdown each with both teams failing to convert their PAT, leaving the score level after the first quarter. After the first quarter, however, Canada pulled away, scoring three more touchdowns and two field goals while keeping Australia from scoring any more points. The game's MVP awards were presented to Canada's quarterback Maude Lacasse (passing for 133 yards 1 touchdown, and 1 interception, while also rushing for 37 yards) and Australia's wide receiver Jordan Di Mizio (with 7 catches for 52 yards and 1 touchdown).

Game information

First quarter

- CAN - Laurence Pontbriand 4-yard pass from Maude Lacasse (Kristie Elliott kick failed), 05:49. Canada 6-0. Drive: 8 plays, 59 yards, 3:56.
- AUS - Jordan Di Mizio 17-yard pass from Isabella Paholek (Xanthe Gray rush failed), 03.12. Tie 6-6. Drive: 6 plays, 66 yards, 2:28.

Second quarter

- CAN - Hallie Eggie 1-yard run (Kristie Elliott kick), 11:53. Canada 13-6. Drive: 7 plays, 54 yards, 3:13.
- CAN - Nura Muhindo 0-yard fumble return (Kristie Elliott kick), 01:04. Canada 20-6.

Third quarter

- CAN - Kristie Elliott 25-yard field goal, 07:12. Canada 23-6. Drive: 8 plays, 76 yards, 3:24.

Fourth quarter

- CAN - Sarah Wright 1-yard run (Kristie Elliott kick), 10:00. Canada 30-6. Drive: 12 plays, 60 yards, 4:40.
- CAN - Kristie Elliott 23-yard field goal, 05:32. Canada 33-6. Drive: 7 plays, 45 yards, 3:08.

Top passers

- CAN - Maude Lacasse - 10/17, 133 yards, TD, INT
- AUS - Isabella Paholek - 8/24, 86 yards, TD, INT

Top rushers

- CAN - Hanna McEwen - 9 rushes, 84 yards
- AUS - Jordan Di Mizio - 4 rushes, 33 yards

Top receivers

- CAN - Virginie Roussel - 4 receptions, 86 yards
- AUS - Jordan Di Mizio - 7 receptions, 52 yards, TD

More information

- Report (in Finnish) at the Wayback Machine (archived 1 October 2022)
- Full stats at the Wayback Machine (archived 31 July 2022)

| Quarter | 1 | 2 | 3 | 4 | Total |
|---|---|---|---|---|---|
| Finland | 7 | 14 | 14 | 14 | 49 |
| Sweden | 0 | 0 | 0 | 0 | 0 |

at Myyrmäen jalkapallostadion, Vantaa

- Date: July 30
- Game time: 16:30
- Game attendance: 828
- Referee: Desirée S. Abrams, United States
- Finland beat Sweden thanks in part to a dominant defensive performance, where the Swedes were kept to negative offensive yardage in the first half, as well as an imposing performance by running back Tytti Kuusinen who rushed for three touchdowns. The game's MVP awards were presented to Finland's Kuusinen and Sweden's linebacker Elin Thimfors.

Game information

First quarter

- FIN - Tytti Kuusinen 2-yard run (Laura Pulkkinen kick), 06:31. Finland 7-0. Drive: 3 plays, 3 yards, 1:19.

Second quarter

- FIN - Laura Pulkkinnen 1-yard run (Laura Pulkkinen kick), 04:17. Finland 14-0. Drive: 9 plays, 32 yards, 4:43.
- FIN - Emmi Järn 17-yard pass from Emilia Räty (Laura Pulkkinen kick), 01:11. Finland 21-0. Drive: 6 plays, 39 yards, 1:51.

Third quarter

- FIN - Tytti Kuusinen 33-yard run (Laura Pulkkinen kick), 06:26. Finland 28-0. Drive: 3 plays, 55 yards, 1:17.
- FIN - Janika Nikander 3-yard interception return (Laura Pulkkinen kick), 01:35. Finland 35-0.

Fourth quarter

- FIN - Mari Jääskelä 5-yard run (Laura Pulkkinen kick), 11:26. Finland 42-0. Drive: 5 plays, 32 yards, 1:56.
- FIN - Tytti Kuusinen 9-yard run (Laura Pulkkinen kick), 05:12. Finland 49-0. Drive: 7 plays, 47 yards, 4:31.

Top passers

- FIN - Emilia Räty - 6/15, 46 yards, TD, INT
- SWE - Bim Jensen-Östlund - 6/19, 42 yards, INT

Top rushers

- FIN - Tytti Kuusinen, 18 rushes, 108 yards, 3TD
- SWE - Elin Luuk, 1 rush, 4 yards

Top receivers

- FIN - Essi Söderholm, 3 receptions, 32 yards
- SWE - Anna Hedström, 3 receptions, 29 yards

More information

- Report at the Wayback Machine (archived 1 October 2022)
- Full stats at the Wayback Machine (archived 14 November 2023)

| Quarter | 1 | 2 | 3 | 4 | Total |
|---|---|---|---|---|---|
| United States | 21 | 14 | 14 | 14 | 63 |
| Germany | 0 | 0 | 0 | 0 | 0 |

at Myyrmäen jalkapallostadion, Vantaa

- Date: July 30
- Game time: 19:30
- Game attendance: 355
- Referee: Veikko Lamminsalo, Finland
- The heavily favored United States secured a dominant win as the team started scoring early and kept scoring throughout the game, putting up nine touchdowns. The Germans were held to a mere 17 yards of offense. The game's MVP awards were presented to USA's quarterback Brittany Bushman and Germany's defensive back Dora Jung.

Game information

First quarter

- USA - Maria Jackson 27-yard pass from Brittany Bushman (Alaina Lange kick), 06:51. USA 7-0. Drive: 8 plays, 63 yards, 3:04.
- USA - Brittany Bushman 1-yard run (Alaina Lange kick), 02:31. USA 14-0. Drive: 8 plays, 50 yards, 3:01.
- USA - Kristen London 85-yard interception return (Alaina Lange kick), 00:00. USA 21-0.

Second quarter

- USA - Maria Jackson 38-yard pass from Brittany Bushman (Alaina Lange kick), 07:46. USA 28-0. Drive: 5 plays, 48 yards, 1:57.
- USA - D'Ajah Scott 1-yard run (Alaina Lange kick), 04:06. USA 35-0. Drive: 10 plays, 50 yards, 3:38.

Third quarter

- USA - Jana Meister 11-yard pass from Tori Tucker (Alaina Lange kick), 09:27. USA 42-0. Drive: 6 plays, 60 yards, 2:26.
- USA - Tori Tucker 11-yard run (Alaina Lange kick), 05:34. USA 49-0. Drive: 8 plays, 45 yards, 2:55.

Fourth quarter

- USA - Knengi Martin 5-yard run (Alaina Lange kick), 11:25. USA 56-0. Drive: 10 plays, 62 yards, 4:14.
- USA - Adriana Gutierrez 1-yard run (Alaina Lange kick), 07:04. USA 63-0. Drive: 5 plays, 30 yards, 2:06.

Top passers

- USA - Brittany Bushman - 9/13, 149 yards, 2TD
- GER - Silvana Friese - 7/15, 37 yards, INT

Top rushers

- USA - D'Ajah Scott - 11 rushes, 70 yards, TD

Top receivers

- USA - Maria Jackson - 3 receptions, 89 yards, 2TD
- GER - Anja Treiber - 4 receptions, 31 yards

More information

- Report at the Wayback Machine (archived 28 September 2022)
- Full stats at the Wayback Machine (archived 14 November 2023)

=== Gameday Two ===
| Quarter | 1 | 2 | 3 | 4 | Total |
|---|---|---|---|---|---|
| Australia | 0 | 0 | 6 | 0 | 6 |
| Mexico | 14 | 6 | 8 | 6 | 34 |

at Myyrmäen jalkapallostadion, Vantaa

- Date: August 3
- Game time: 10:00
- Game attendance: 232
- Referee: Jessica Ringelstein, Germany
- The game's MVP awards were given to Mexico's quarterback Maria Cruz and Australia's defensive back Shannon Whale.

Game information

First quarter

- MEX - Andrea Romero 7-yard pass from Maria Cruz (Karla Granados kick blocked), 06:56. Mexico 6-0. Drive: 8 plays, 79 yards, 2:31.
- MEX - Maria Pacheco 11-yard pass from Maria Cruz (Maria Pacheco pass from Maria Cruz), 00:29. Mexico 14-0. Drive: 9 plays, 73 yards, 4:03.

Second quarter

- MEX - Ana Barbosa 9-yard pass from Maria Cruz (Maria Cruz pass failed), 04:15. Mexico 20-0. Drive: 12 plays, 62 yards, 5:32.

Third quarter

- AUS - Casey Byrne 4-yard run (Macey Fegan run failed), 05:23. Mexico 20-6. Drive: 4 plays, 3 yards, 1:09.
- MEX - Andrea Romero 3-yard run (Maria Pacheco pass from Maria Cruz), 01:39. Mexico 28-6. Drive: 8 plays, 45 yards, 3:40.

Fourth quarter

- MEX - Ana Barbosa 13-yard pass from Maria Cruz (Maria Cruz pass failed), 02:46. Mexico 34-6. Drive: 10 plays, 75 yards, 2:39.

Top passers

- AUS - Isabella Paholek - 2/8, 8 yards, INT
- MEX - Maria Cruz - 20/34, 190 yards, 4TD, INT

Top rushers

- AUS - Casey Byrne - 13 rushes, 45 yards, TD
- MEX - Ana Barbosa - 2 rushes, 35 yards

Top receivers

- AUS - Jordan Di Mizio - 2 receptions, 9 yards
- MEX - Ana Barbosa - 5 receptions, 73 yards, 2TD

More information

- Report at the Wayback Machine (archived 10 August 2022)
- Full stats at the Wayback Machine (archived 14 November 2023)

| Quarter | 1 | 2 | 3 | 4 | Total |
|---|---|---|---|---|---|
| Germany | 0 | 0 | 6 | 0 | 6 |
| Sweden | 0 | 0 | 0 | 0 | 0 |

at Myyrmäen jalkapallostadion, Vantaa

- Date: August 3
- Game time: 13:00
- Game attendance: 357
- Referee: Veikko Lamminsalo, Finland
- Game MVPs were awarded to RB Back Elin Luuk (SWE) and WR Ellen Riess (GER)

Game information

Third quarter

- GER - Ellen Ries 31-yard pass from Silvana Friese (Mona Stevens pass failed), 07.10. Germany 6-0. Drive: 2 plays, 25 yards, 0:45.

Top passers

- GER - Silvana Friese - 6/20, 101 yards, TD, INT
- SWE - Linda Widberg - 2/16, 14 yards, 4INT

Top rushers

- GER - Ellen Ries - 1 rush, 18 yards
- SWE - Elin Luuk - 30 rushes, 159 yards

Top receivers

- GER - Ellen Ries - 3 receptions, 66 yards, TD
- SWE - Elin Luuk - 1 reception, 10 yards

More information

- Report at the Wayback Machine (archived 10 August 2022)
- Full stats at the Wayback Machine (archived 16 November 2023)

| Quarter | 1 | 2 | 3 | 4 | Total |
|---|---|---|---|---|---|
| United States | 7 | 0 | 14 | 7 | 28 |
| Finland | 3 | 7 | 0 | 0 | 10 |

at Myyrmäen jalkapallostadion, Vantaa

- Date: August 3
- Game time: 16:30
- Game attendance: 919
- Referee: Jim Kaya, Sweden
- The game was even fought before half time with multiple lead changes, before the US were able to capitalize on a key turnover early in the third quarter to grab the lead and then stifle Finland's attack to the point where the Fins would not score again in the game. The game's MVP awards were given to USA's running back D'Ajah Scott and Finland's linebacker Essi Saastamoinen.

Game information

First quarter

- FIN - Laura Pulkkinen 35-yard field goal, 03:10. Finland 3-0. Drive: 7 plays, 0 yards, 3:33.
- USA - D'Ajah Scott 15-yard run (Alaina Lange kick), 00:42. USA 7-3. Drive: 6 plays, 54 yards, 2:21.

Second quarter

- FIN - Tytti Kuusinen 9-yard run (Laura Pulkkinen kick), 04:23. Finland 10-7. Drive: 7 plays, 53 yards, 3:12.

Third quarter

- USA - D'Ajah Scott 15-yard run (Alaina Lange kick), 09:03. USA 14-10. Drive: 2 plays, 23 yards, 0:31.
- USA - D'Ajah Scott 5-yard run (Alaina Lange kick), 00:46. USA 21-10. Drive: 6 plays, 47 yards, 1:29.

Fourth quarter

- USA - Adriana Gutierrez 1-yard run (Alaina Lange kick), 02:40. USA 28-10. Drive: 8 plays, 29 yards, 2:58.

Top passers

- USA - Brittany Bushman - 20/34, 189 yards, 2INT
- FIN - Emilia Räty - 3/9, 2 yards

Top rushers

- USA - D'Ajah Scott - 17 rushes, 71 yards, 3TD
- FIN - Tytti Kuusinen - 10 rushes, 53 yards, TD

Top receivers

- USA - Angela Baker - 6 receptions, 35 yards
- FIN - Tytti Kuusinen - 1 reception, 2 yards

More information

- Report at the Wayback Machine (archived 10 August 2022)
- Full stats at the Wayback Machine (archived 15 November 2023)

| Quarter | 1 | 2 | 3 | 4 | Total |
|---|---|---|---|---|---|
| Canada | 7 | 0 | 6 | 0 | 13 |
| Great Britain | 0 | 13 | 0 | 7 | 20 |

at Myyrmäen jalkapallostadion, Vantaa

- Date: August 3
- Game time: 19:30
- Game attendance: 565
- Referee: Desirée S. Abrams, United States
- In a defensive battle that came down to the game's last seconds, Great Britain was able to mount a 9 play, 40 yard drive in the fourth quarter to get the winning touchdown and send the team to its first ever World Championship final. The game's MVP awards were given to Canada's defensive back Harmine Leo and Great Britain's defensive back Phoebe Schecter.

Game information

First quarter

- CAN - Hanna McEwen 1-yard run (Kristie Elliott kick), 06:05. Canada 7-0. Drive: 1 play, 1 yard, 00:05.

Second quarter

- GBR - Lucy Peaty 28-yard interception return (Samantha Read kick failed), 11:37. Canada 7-6.
- GBR - Sydney Green 2-yard run (Samantha Read kick), 00:00. Great Britain 13-7. Drive: 4 plays, 31 yards, 00:39.

Third quarter

- CAN - Sarah Wright 1-yard run (Kristie Elliott pass failed), 09:04. Tie 13-13. Drive: 5 plays, 59 yards, 02:49.

Fourth quarter

- GBR - Siobhan Walker 10-yard pass from Sydney Green (Samantha Read kick), 00:02. Great Britain 20-13. Drive: 9 plays, 40 yards, 03:20.

Top passers

- CAN - Maude Lacasse - 10/20, 79 yards, 2INT
- GBR - Sydney Green - 18/28, 140 yards, TD, 3INT

Top rushers

- CAN - Kasey McCombs - 8 rushes, 70 yards
- GBR - Siobhan Walker - 7 rushes, 77 yards

Top receivers

- CAN - Laurence Pontbriand - 5 receptions, 43 yards
- GBR - Jessica Anderson - 6 receptions, 45 yards

More information

- Report at the Wayback Machine (archived 10 August 2022)
- Full stats at the Wayback Machine (archived 17 April 2025)

=== Gameday Three ===
| Quarter | 1 | 2 | 3 | 4 | Total |
|---|---|---|---|---|---|
| Sweden | 0 | 0 | 0 | 0 | 0 |
| Australia | 0 | 0 | 0 | 7 | 7 |

at Myyrmäen jalkapallostadion, Vantaa

- Date: August 7
- Game time: 10:00
- Game attendance: 212
- Referee: Jessica Ringelstein, Germany
- Controversy going into the 7th place game as Sweden had some of their top players sanctioned by IFAF for off field misdemeanours, despite protests from both teams. A tight back and forth ground game was broken in the 4th quarter by Casey Byrne of WA on a 75 yard rush. The PAT was snapped by Grace Murphy of ACT, held by Xanthe Grey of WA, and kicked by Marissa Hayes of QLD. Australia went on to hold out Sweden in the last minutes to record their first ever win at the IFAF Women's World Championships. Game MVPs were awarded to DB Frida Åkesson (SWE) and RB Casey Byrne (AUS)

Game information
- Report at the Wayback Machine (archived 1 October 2022)
- Full stats at the Wayback Machine (archived 9 April 2025)

| Quarter | 1 | 2 | 3 | 4 | Total |
|---|---|---|---|---|---|
| Mexico | 8 | 0 | 14 | 6 | 28 |
| Germany | 0 | 0 | 0 | 0 | 0 |

at Myyrmäen jalkapallostadion, Vantaa

- Date: August 7
- Game time: 13:00
- Game attendance: 313
- Referee: Jim Kaya, Sweden
- Game MVPs were awarded to RB Andrea Romero (MEX) and LB Susanne Erdmann (GER)

Game information
- Report at the Wayback Machine (archived 28 September 2022)
- Full stats at the Wayback Machine (archived 29 November 2024)

| Quarter | 1 | 2 | 3 | 4 | Total |
|---|---|---|---|---|---|
| Canada | 0 | 10 | 0 | 7 | 17 |
| Finland | 0 | 3 | 13 | 3 | 19 |

at Myyrmäen jalkapallostadion, Vantaa

- Date: August 7
- Game time: 16:30
- Game attendance: 1,315
- Referee: Desirée S. Abrams, United States
- Game MVPs were awarded to QB Maude Lacasse (CAN) and RB/K Laura Pulkkinen (FIN)

Game information
- Report at the Wayback Machine (archived 1 October 2022)
- Full stats at the Wayback Machine (archived 9 April 2025)

| Quarter | 1 | 2 | 3 | 4 | Total |
|---|---|---|---|---|---|
| United States | 7 | 7 | 14 | 14 | 42 |
| Great Britain | 7 | 7 | 0 | 0 | 14 |

at Myyrmäen jalkapallostadion, Vantaa

- Date: August 7
- Game time: 19:30
- Game attendance: 868
- Referee: Veikko Lamminsalo, Finland
- Game MVPs were awarded to QB Brittney Bushman (USA) and RB Ruth Matta (GBR)

Game information
- Report at the Wayback Machine (archived 1 October 2022)
- Full stats at the Wayback Machine (archived 25 February 2025)
