= Callie Brownson =

American football player and coach (born 1989)

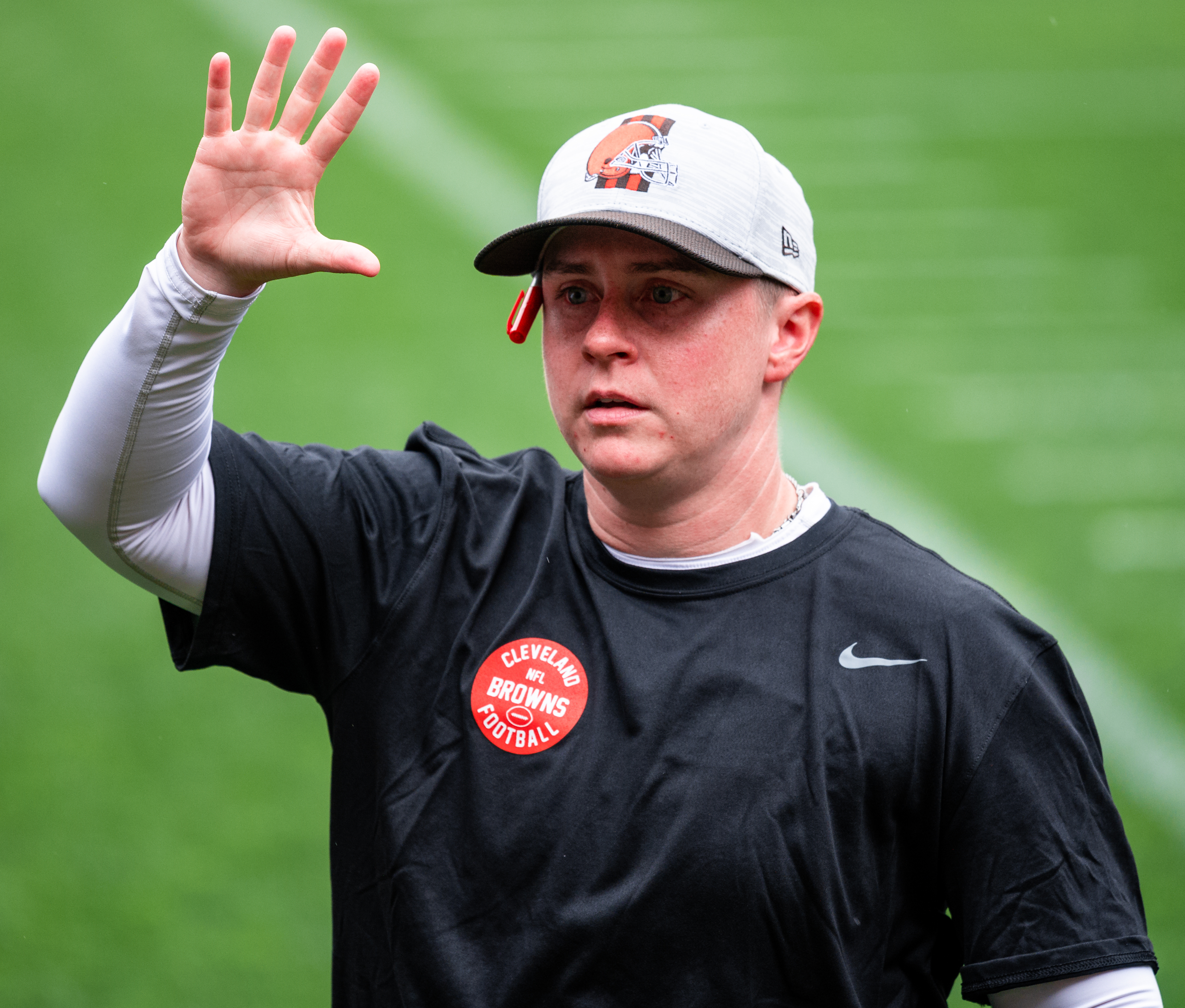
- Brownson in 2021

Profile
- Position: Assistant wide receivers coach

Personal information
- Born: October 15, 1989 (age 37); Mount Vernon, Virginia, U.S.

Career information
- High school: Mount Vernon
- College: George Mason University

Career history

Playing
- D.C. Divas (2010–2017)

Coaching
- Dartmouth (2018) Offensive quality control coach; Buffalo Bills (2019) Coaching intern; Cleveland Browns (2020–2021) Chief of staff; Cleveland Browns (2022) Chief of staff/assistant wide receivers; Cleveland Browns (2023–2024) Assistant wide receivers

Operations
- New York Jets (2017) Scouting intern

Awards and highlights
- As player: 2× WFA champion (2015, 2016)

Callie Brownson
Medal record

Women's American football

Representing United States

World Championship
| Gold medal – first place | 2013 Finland | Team competition |
| Gold medal – first place | 2017 Vancouver | Team competition |

Callie Brownson (born October 15, 1989) is an American football coach and player who last served as the assistant wide receivers coach for the Cleveland Browns of the National Football League (NFL). In September 2018, she became the first woman hired as a full-time NCAA Division I coach, when she was promoted by Dartmouth, after briefly working as an intern for the team.

Brownson played for the D.C. Divas in the Women's Football Alliance (WFA) from 2010 to 2017 as a free safety and running back, winning two championships. She also won two gold medals with the United States women's national American football team.

== Early life ==
Born in Mount Vernon, Virginia, Brownson was raised by her father, Bruce B. Brownson. She attended Mount Vernon High School, where she played softball, as the football team would not allow girls.

== Playing career ==
While attending George Mason University, Brownson tried out for the D.C. Divas in the Women's Football Alliance (WFA) at age 19. She played with the team for eight seasons, five of which she served as a team captain and four of which she was named All-American. Brownson was also a member of the United States women's national American football team when it won the IFAF Women's World Championship in 2013 and 2017.

== Coaching career ==
Brownson was an assistant football coach at her alma mater, Mount Vernon High School, for three seasons, beginning at age 21. In 2017, she served as a scouting intern for the New York Jets. In 2019, she was hired by the Buffalo Bills to serve as a coaching intern.

She became the first woman to coach an NFL position group in a regular-season game when she filled in for the Cleveland Browns tight ends coach Drew Petzing in a week 12 game against the Jacksonville Jaguars on November 29, 2020. She filled in for passing game coordinator and wide receivers coach Chad O'Shea during the week 17 game against the Pittsburgh Steelers, and for Petzing again during the Browns' first game of the 2020–21 NFL playoffs. On March 3, 2023, Brownson was promoted to assistant wide receivers coach.

On January 10, 2025, it was announced that Brownson would be leaving the Browns to join USA Football as the senior director of high performance & national team operations.

== Arrest ==
On May 27, 2021, Brownson was arrested in Brunswick, Ohio after she was observed driving 20 miles per hour above the speed limit. Her blood alcohol content was .215, over twice the legal limit of .08. On June 8, 2021, Brownson pleaded no contest to a charge of operating a vehicle under the influence. She was fined and ordered to attend a driver intervention program. The Browns announced that she was suspended from team activities and would face discipline.
