= Lori Locust =

American football coach (born 1964)

Personal information
- Born: 1964 (age 61–62); Philadelphia, Pennsylvania, U.S.

Career information
- High school: Susquehanna Township (Harrisburg, Pennsylvania)
- College: Temple

Career history
- Keystone Assault (2008–2012) Assistant coach; Susquehanna Township HS (2010–2018) Assistant coach; Central Penn Piranha (2013–2016) Assistant coach; DMV Elite (2016–2018) Assistant coach; Central Penn Capitals (2016) Defensive line coach; Keystone Assault (2017–2018) Assistant coach; Lehigh Valley Steelhawks (2017–2018) Defensive line coach / linebackers coach / co-special teams coordinator; Baltimore Ravens (2018) Defensive line coaching intern; Birmingham Iron (2019) Assistant defensive line coach; Tampa Bay Buccaneers (2019–2022) Assistant defensive line coach; Tennessee Titans (2023–2024) Defensive quality control coach; Tennessee Titans (2025) Defensive assistant

Awards and highlights
- Super Bowl champion (LV)

Lori Locust (born 1964) is an American football coach who is a defensive quality control coach for the Tennessee Titans of the National Football League (NFL).

== Early life ==
Locust was born in 1964 in Philadelphia, Pennsylvania. She grew up in Harrisburg, Pennsylvania. She graduated from Susquehanna Township High School in 1982, and attended Temple University for two years before leaving to tend to her ill father.

== Playing career ==
Locust joined a semi-professional women's football team in 2004 as a defensive lineman. In her fourth season for the Central PA Vipers, she was named team captain and MVP, but retired after the next season due to a knee injury.

== Coaching career ==
Locust coached the Vipers after retiring from her playing career with the team. She was also hired as an assistant coach at Susquehanna Township High School in 2009, and coached there until 2018. A men's semi-professional football team, the Central Penn Piranha, hired her as an assistant coach in 2013. She coached with the Central Penn Capitals of American Indoor Football in 2016. She became the defensive line and linebackers coach and co-special teams coordinator for the Lehigh Valley Steelhawks of the National Arena League in 2017. In 2018, she was a defensive line coaching intern for the Baltimore Ravens during their training camp. The Birmingham Iron of the Alliance of American Football hired her as their assistant defensive line coach for the 2019 season before the league folded.

Locust was hired by the Tampa Bay Buccaneers as their assistant defensive line coach in March 2019 under head coach Bruce Arians. She became the first female position coach in the NFL and third female full-time assistant coach in NFL history, after Kathryn Smith and Katie Sowers. Locust and assistant strength and conditioning coach Maral Javadifar became the first female coaches to win a Super Bowl when the Buccaneers defeated the Kansas City Chiefs in Super Bowl LV on February 7, 2021.

On February 5, 2023, the Tennessee Titans hired Locust as a defensive assistant. The hiring made Locust Tennessee's first full-time female coach in franchise history. On January 22, 2026, it was announced that Locust would not be retained under new head coach Robert Saleh.

== Personal ==
Locust married, and later divorced, Andrew Locust, who played college football for Temple, and they had two children together.
