= Jennifer Welter =

American football player (born 1977)

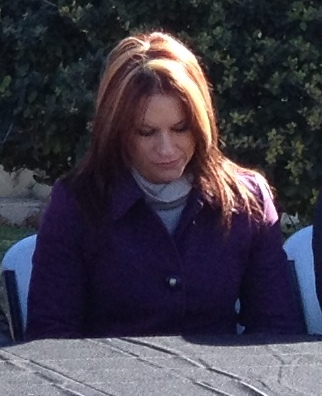
- Welter in 2014

Profile
- Position: Running back

Personal information
- Born: October 27, 1977 (age 49); Vero Beach, Florida
- Listed height: 5 ft 2 in (1.57 m)
- Listed weight: 130 lb (59 kg)

Career information
- High school: Sebastian (FL) River
- College: Boston College

Career history

Playing
- Massachusetts Mutiny (2001–2002); Dallas Dragons (2002); Dallas Diamonds (2002–2012); Texas Revolution (2014)

Coaching
- Texas Revolution (2015) Linebackers and special teams coach; Arizona Cardinals (2015) Assistant coaching intern; Atlanta Legends (2019) Defensive specialist

Awards and highlights
- 3x WPFL champion (2004, 2005, 2006); IWFL champion (2008)

Jennifer Welter
Medal record

Women's American football

Representing United States

World Championship
Gold medal – first place	2010 Sweden	Team competition
Gold medal – first place	2013 Finland	Team competition

Jennifer Welter (born October 27, 1977) is an American football coach who was most recently a defensive specialist for the Atlanta Legends of the Alliance of American Football (AAF). She was a defensive coaching intern for the National Football League's Arizona Cardinals during their training camp and the 2015 preseason, making her the first female coaching intern in the NFL. This is her third "first" for men's football in 2014 and 2015.

On February 12, 2015, Champions Indoor Football's Texas Revolution named Welter their linebackers and special teams coach making her the first woman to coach in a men's professional football league. A year prior, the 5 ft 2 in (1.57 m), 130 lb (59.0 kg) Welter was signed by the Revolution as a running back. This made her the second female player for a position other than kicker or placekick-holder on a men's professional football team, and the first at running back. She is not the first female to play a male dominant sport; however, she is the second woman after ice hockey player Hayley Wickenheiser to play a "contact" position in a male dominant sport and the first woman in football to do so.

Welter was featured in Mogul's #IAmAMogul campaign as part of Women's History Month in March 2016 for "changing the perception of what it means to be an NFL coach."

== Prior competition ==
Welter is a veteran of several women's professional and semi-professional football teams (including the Dallas Diamonds and Dallas Dragons). She was a gold medal-winning member of Team USA at the IFAF Women's World Championship in 2010 and 2013. She played rugby in college.

== Texas Revolution ==
Welter's first action as a Revolution running back came during a preseason game on February 15, 2014, against the North Texas Crunch. Welter rushed for three carries for −1 yards. On February 19, the Revolution named Welter to their 2014 regular season roster.

On February 12, 2015, the Revolution introduced Welter as their new linebackers and special teams coach. She is the first woman to coach in a men's professional football league.

== Arizona Cardinals ==
On July 27, 2015, the Arizona Cardinals hired Welter as an assistant coaching intern for training camp and the preseason; as such, she is believed to be the first female coach in the NFL. Her internship with the Cardinals expired after the team's third preseason game on August 30, 2015. Her coaching style does not differ from many, according to Cardinals' Tyrann Mathieu. The Washington Post added, "The biggest question coming in was would guys in the NFL respond to a woman coaching them, and the obvious answer is yes".

== Atlanta Legends ==
On December 11, 2018, Welter was hired by the Atlanta Legends of the newly-formed Alliance of American Football as a defensive specialist under head coach Brad Childress.

== Education ==
Welter graduated from Boston College and has a master's degree in Sport psychology and a PhD in psychology from Capella University.

== See also ==
- Kathryn Smith
- List of female American football players
- Justine Siegal
