= 2017 IFAF Women's World Championship =

2017 edition of the IFAF Women's World Championship

Tournament details
- Host nation: Canada
- Dates: June 24 – June 30
- No. of nations: 6
- Champions: United States (3rd title)
- Runner-up: Canada
- Third-place: Mexico
- MVP of the tournament: (United States) Sami Grisafe (Offense) (United States) Kimberly Marks (Defense)

The 2017 IFAF Women's World Championship was the third IFAF Women's World Championship, an American football competition for women. It was held between June 24 and 30, 2017. The tournament was hosted at McLeod Stadium in Langley, British Columbia, Canada. The defending champion is United States.

== Participating teams ==
Team	Finals appearance	Last appearance	Best appearance
United States	3rd	2013	1st (2010, 2013)
Canada	3rd	2013	2nd (2010, 2013)
Finland	3rd	2013	3rd (2010, 2013)
Australia	1st	—	—
Great Britain	1st	—	—
Mexico	1st	—	—

== Preliminary stage ==
Team	Pld	W	L	PF	PA
United States	2	2	0	77	0
Canada	2	2	0	66	6
Mexico	2	1	1	31	39
Great Britain	2	1	1	27	56
Finland	2	0	2	21	75
Australia	2	0	2	16	62

Quarter	1	2	3	4	Total
Great Britain	7	6	8	6	27
Finland	7	0	7	7	21

at McLeod Stadium, Langley

- Date: June 24
- Game time: 11:30
- Referee: N/A
- Game MVPs: Lucy Kirk (GBR), Jenni Lindén (FIN)

Quarter	1	2	3	4	Total
Mexico	0	0	0	0	0
United States	0	16	7	6	29

at McLeod Stadium, Langley

- Date: June 24
- Game time: 15:30
- Referee: TBA
- Game MVPs: Daniela-Michelle Zamudio Guzman (MEX), Hannah DeGraffinrreed (USA)

Quarter	1	2	3	4	Total
Australia	0	0	6	0	6
Canada	3	14	7	7	31

at McLeod Stadium, Langley

- Date: June 24
- Game time: 19:30
- Referee: TBA
- Game MVPs: DL Canecia Simms (AUS), RB Cassey Brick (CAN)

Quarter	1	2	3	4	Total
Mexico	7	0	12	12	31
Australia	0	2	8	0	10

at McLeod Stadium, Langley

- Date: June 27
- Game time: 11:30
- Referee: TBA
- Game MVPs: DB Consuelo Alejandra Hernandez Macias (MEX), DL Jasmin Collins (AUS)

Quarter	1	2	3	4	Total
Finland	0	0	0	0	0
United States	0	21	20	7	48

at McLeod Stadium, Langley

- Date: June 27
- Game time: 15:30
- Referee: TBA
- Game MVPs: DL Angel Smith (USA), LB Tiina Möttönen (FIN)

Quarter	1	2	3	4	Total
Great Britain	0	0	0	0	0
Canada	0	21	7	7	35

at McLeod Stadium, Langley

- Date: June 27
- Game time: 19:30
- Referee: TBA
- Game MVPs: LB Phoebe Schecter (GBR), Emma Goldsney (CAN)

== Placement games ==
Game	Date	Kickoff	Home	Result	Visitor
5th placed	June 30	11:30	Finland	35–0	Australia
Bronze medal	June 30	3:30	Great Britain	8-19	Mexico
Championship	June 30	7:30	United States	41-16	Canada

=== 5th placed game ===
Quarter	1	2	3	4	Total
Australia	0	0	0	0	0
Finland	7	7	13	8	35

at McLeod Stadium, Langley

- Date: June 30
- Game time: 11:30
- Referee: Pete Parsons (Great Britain)
- Game MVPs: RB Laura Pulkkinen (FIN), DL Rhyanna Edbrooke (AUS)

=== Bronze medal game ===
Quarter	1	2	3	4	Total
Mexico	7	6	6	0	19
Great Britain	0	8	0	0	8

at McLeod Stadium, Langley

- Date: June 30
- Game time: 15:30
- Referee: TBA
- Game MVPs: Andrea Romero Vazquez (MEX), Ruth Matta (GBR)

=== Gold medal game ===
Quarter	1	2	3	4	Total
Canada	3	6	7	0	16
United States	14	7	6	14	41

at McLeod Stadium, Langley

- Date: June 30
- Game time: 19:30
- Referee: Keith Wickham (Great Britain)
- Game MVPs: Laurence Pontbriand (CAN), Ashley Whisonont (USA)

== See also ==
- Football Canada
- American football
