= Canada women's national American football team =

Canada

The Canada women's national American football team is the official American football senior national team of Canada.

== History ==
Canada debuted at the first IFAF Women's World Championship in 2010. They advanced to the championship game and received the silver medal after losing to the United States in the championship game. They competed at the 2013 championship, again advancing to the championship. They again finished second after losing to the United States 64–0. Canadian team won a silver for the third time in the 2017 championship after losing to the United States 41-16. At the 2022 championship, they lost against Finland in the bronze medal match.

== IFAF Women's World Championship record ==
Year	Position	GP	W	L
(Sweden) 2010	2nd	3	2	1
(Finland) 2013	2nd	3	2	1
(Canada) 2017	2nd	3	2	1
(Finland) 2022	4th	3	1	2

== See also ==
- Canada men's national football team
