= Canadian women's football team =

Canadian women's football team may refer to:

- Canada women's national American football team
- Canada women's national soccer team
