= Mexico women's national American football team =

Medal record

Women's American football

Representing Mexico

World Championships
Bronze medal – third place	2017 Canada	

The Mexico women's national American football team is the official American football senior national team of Mexico.

== History ==
Mexico debuted by competing at the third IFAF Women's World Championship in 2017. In their first game on June 24, despite losing to the United States by a score of 29–0, they held the undefeated world champions to the fewest points they have ever scored in international competition. Three days later, they defeated Australia 31–10 to qualify for the bronze medal game on June 30. In said game, Mexico defeated Great Britain 19–8 to win the bronze medal.

Mexico entered the 2022 World Championship looking to build on their bronze medal from five years prior, but the confusion around missing airplane tickets caused the team to miss out on their opening game against Great Britain, thus forcing Mexico into the consolation bracket of the tournament before even having played a game. According to the Mexican American Football Federation, the airplane confusion was due to a strike at Lufthansa.
