= Spain national American football team =

The Spain national American football team is the official American football senior national team of Spain.

== Men's team ==
The men's team played four times in the EFAF European Championship. Nowadays, Spain plays in Group C, the third division of the European Championship. They failed to qualify for the 2018 tournament in Germany, losing in the first qualifying round against Israel in their first-ever match 28–20.

== Women's team ==
The team competed at the 2013 IFAF Women's World Championship, where they finished last after losing to Sweden 64–0.

=== Results ===
==== World Championship ====
Year	Position	Pld	W	L
(Finland) 2013	6th	3	0	3

==== European Championship ====
Year	Position	Pld	W	L
(Spain) 2015	5th	3	1	2
(Europe) 2023-24	1st	3	3	0
(Europe) 2025-26	3st	3	2	1
