= United States women's national American football team =

Women's national American football team representing the United States

United States
- Association: USA Football
- Confederation: IFAF Americas
- IFAF Ranking: 1
- Colors: Black olive White

IFAF Women's World Championship
- Best result: Gold (2010, 2013, 2017, 2022)

United States women's national American football team
Medal record

Women's World Championship
| Gold medal – first place | 2010 Stockholm | Team |
| Gold medal – first place | 2013 Vantaa | Team |
| Gold medal – first place | 2017 Langley | Team |
| Gold medal – first place | 2022 Vantaa | Team |

The United States women's national American football team represents the United States in international women's American football competitions. It is currently ranked no.1 in the IFAF. It is controlled by USA Football and is recognized by the International Federation of American Football (IFAF).

== History ==
The original total of 45 women to compete for the USA in the 2010 IFAF Women's World Championship in Stockholm, Sweden. They defeated Canada (66–0) for their first World Championship.

Team USA competed at the 2013 IFAF Women's World Championship, where they took their second title after beating Canada 64–0.

Team USA competed at the 2017 IFAF Women's World Championship, where they took their third title after beating Canada 41–16.

Team USA competed at the 2022 IFAF Women's World Championship, where they took their fourth title after beating Great Britain 42–14.

== Competitive record ==
Champions Runners-up Third place Fourth place

=== IFAF Women's World Championship ===
IFAF Women's World Championship
| Year | Result | Position | GP | W | L | PF | PA |
|---|---|---|---|---|---|---|---|
| (Sweden) 2010 | Champions | 1st | 3 | 3 | 0 | 201 | 0 |
| (Finland) 2013 | Champions | 1st | 3 | 3 | 0 | 255 | 7 |
| (Canada) 2017 | Champions | 1st | 3 | 3 | 0 | 118 | 16 |
| (Finland) 2022 | Champions | 1st | 3 | 3 | 0 | 133 | 24 |
| Total | 4 titles | 4/4 | 12 | 12 | 0 | 707 | 47 |

== 2010 roster ==
2010 USA national football team roster
| Quarterbacks: 3 Melissa Gallegos (So Cal Scorpions); 15 Sami Grisafe (Chicago Force); 71 Karen Mulligan (NY Sharks); 23 Jenny Schmidt (KC Tribe); Running backs: 6 Okiima Pickett (D.C. Divas); 27 Julie Shockley (Sacramento Sirens); 2 Desiree Weimann (So Cal Scorpions); 9 Adrienne Wilson (Seattle Majestics); 48 Jennifer Welter (Dallas Diamonds); Wide receivers: 5 Tracy Adams (Modesto Maniax); 84 Jen Blum (NY Sharks); 1 Onetha Cannon (Atlanta Explosion); 24 Alberta Fitcheard-Brydson (Dallas Diamonds); 81 Lauren Pringle (NY Sharks); 88 Brittany Reinbolt (LA Amazons); 89 Danilynn Welniak (Dallas Diamonds); 9 Adrienne Wilson (Seattle Majestics); Tight ends: 33 Donna Wilkinson (D.C. Divas) | Offensive Linewomen: 64 Tarsha Fain (Baltimore Nighthawks) T; 63 Jamie Menzyk (Chicago Force) G; 70 Dawn Pederson (Chicago Force) T; 61 Michelle Riddle (D.C. Divas) C; 67 Roseanna Smith (Atlanta Xplosion) T; Defensive Linewomen: 62 Jeanamarie Fisher (Portland Shockwave); 86 Olivia Griswold (Pittsburgh Passion) E; 42 Schandra Loveless (Chattanooga Locomotion) E; 47 Kneghi Martin (California Quake) E/LB | Linebackers: 31 Andrea Bandstra (Chicago Force); 53 Keesha Brooks (Chicago Force); 18 Mia Brickhouse (Boston Militia); 57 Julie Carignan (Manchester Freedom); 43 Danielle Golay (Bay Area Bandits); 59 Molly Goodwin (Boston Militia); 30 Leah Hinkle (Portland Shockwave); 85 Kimberly Marks (Chicago Force); 58 Amy Satterfield (LA Amazons); 46 Jessica Springer (Dallas Diamonds); 80 Emily Williams (Dallas Diamonds); Defensive backs: 32 Jennifer Pirog (Manchester Freedom) CB; 20 Erin Sheriff (Iowa Crush) S; 21 Rusty Sowers (KC Tribe) CB; 8 Sharon Vasquez (Pittsburgh Passion) CB/S; Special teams: 17 Sally Maple (Palm Beach Punishers); 20 Erin Sheriff (Iowa Crush) P; 10 Adrienne Smith (NY Sharks) | Head coach: John Konecki; Assistant coaches: Anthony Stone; Mark McLaughlin; Jennifer Huston; Roster accessed 2020-5-12 |

== 2013 roster ==
2013 USA national football team roster
| Quarterbacks: Brittany Bushman (Dallas Diamonds); Sami Grisafe (Chicago Force); Karen Mulligan (NY Sharks); Running backs: Cassey Brick (San Diego Surge); Mia Brickhouse (Boston Militia); Brandy Hatcher (Chicago Force); Odessa Jenkins (Dallas Diamonds); Wide receivers: Ashley Berggren (Chicago Force); Jeanette Gray (Chicago Force); Kimberly Klesse (Columbus Comets); Holly Peterson (Sacramento Sirens); Adrienne Smith (Boston Militia); Liz Sowers (Kansas City Titans); Nicole Vilarino (Portland Shockwave); Tight ends: Donna Wilkinson (D.C. Divas) | Offensive Linewomen: Tami Engelman (Chicago Force); Stephanie Jeffers (Boston Militia); Jamie Menzyk (Chicago Force); Elizabeth Okey (Chicago Force); Dawn Pederson (Chicago Force); Sarah Schkeeper (NY Sharks); Katrina Walter (San Diego Surge); Rebecca Worsham (D.C. Divas); Defensive Linewomen: Kenoris Blackmon (K.C. Tribe); Catherine Converse (Michigan Mayhem); Jennifer Deering (Bay Area Bandits); Danielle Golay (Boston Militia); Kimberly Marks (Chicago Force); Aspen Marshall (Bay Area Bandits); Knengi Martin (San Diego Surge); Rachel May (Dallas Diamonds) | Linebackers: Andreana Campolo (Seattle Majestics); Vicky Eddy (Boston Militia); Kristine Elmore (NY Sharks); Leah Hinkle (Portland Shockwave); Jennifer Plummer (West Michigan Mayhem); Jen Welter (Dallas Diamonds); Defensive backs: Callie Brownson (D.C. Divas); Alberta Brydson (Dallas Diamonds); Rachel Gore (Seattle Majestics); Athena Reyes (NY Sharks); Katie Sowers (Kansas City Titans); Sharon Vasquez (Pittsburgh Passion); Special teams: Angela Larsen (Bay Area Bandits) K/P | Head coach: John Konecki; Assistant coaches: Julie shockley – Wide receivers; Adam lewandowski – Defensive coordinator; John shockley – Defensive line; Nick djurdjevic – Defensive backs; Roster accessed 2020-5-12 |

== 2017 roster ==
2017 USA national football team roster
| Quarterbacks: Sami Grisafe (Chicago Force); Allyson Hamlin (D.C. Divas); Lisa Horton (Pittsburgh Passion); Running backs: Heather Anderson (West Michigan Mayhem); Hannah DeGraffinreed (Carolina Phoenix); Odessa Jenkins (Dallas Elite); Erica Mois (Minnesota Machine); Alexis Snyder (Central Cal War Angels); Wide receivers: Angela Baker (Pittsburgh Passion); Jeanette Gray (Chicago Force); Holly Peterson (Sacramento Sirens); Ashley Whisonant (D.C. Divas); Tight ends: Brilynn Fields (NY Sharks); Emily Weinberg (Boston Renegades) | Offensive Linewomen: Eboni Chambers (San Diego Surge); Elizabeth Dillow (Cleveland Fusion); Lauren Ferragonio (Pittsburgh Passion); Jennifer Gray (Baltimore Nighthawks); Rachel Huhn (D.C. Divas); Stephanie Jeffers (Boston Renegades); Dawn Pederson (Chicago Force); Jenitra Shields (Atlanta Phoenix); Rebecca Worsham (D.C. Divas); Defensive Linewomen: Kimberly Marks (Chicago Force); Rachel May (Dallas Elite); Tawanna Sanders (Indy Crash); Angelique Smith (Chicago Force); Edie Quest (San Diego Surge) | Linebackers: Sonja Drangsholt (Chicago Force); Vicky Eddy (Boston Renegades); Angellica Grayson (Dallas Elite); Liz Landry (Dallas Elite); Tia Watkins (D.C. Divas); Qiana Wright (Philadelphia Phantomz); Defensive backs: Sa'toria Bell (Philadelphia Phantomz); Callie Brownson (D.C. Divas); Jewelle Grimsley (NY Sharks); Emilie Hallé (Detroit Dark Angels); Kristen London (Atlanta Phoenix); McKenzie Tolliver (Seattle Majestics); Angie Wells (Philadelphia Phantomz); Special teams: Melissa Strother (San Diego Surge) K/P | Head coach: Jim Farell; Assistant coaches: Allyson Hamlin; Roster accessed 2020-5-12 |

== See also ==
- American football
- American football in the United States
- Women's football in the United States
- Women's American football
- IFAF Women's World Championship
- National Football League
