= IFAF Women's World Championship =

American football competition for women's national teams

- Upcoming season or competition: 2022 IFAF Women's World Championship
- Sport: American football
- Founded: 2010
- No. of teams: 8
- Most recent champion: United States (4th title)
- Most titles: United States (4 titles)
- Website: Official website

The IFAF Women's World Championship is the international championship for women in American football. The first event was held in 2010, in Stockholm, Sweden, with six countries competing. The United States took home the gold while not letting any team they played score. The second event was held in 2013, with Vantaa, Finland, hosting the games. The United States swept the competitors again, winning the gold medal. Third event was played in 2017 with Canada as the host nation. The U.S. took the gold medal for the third time, again beating the host nation Canada in the final. For the fourth event, Finland hosted the tournament for the second time in 2022. U.S. took a fourth gold medal after beating Great Britain.

== Results ==
Yearly results
Year	Host	Final			Third-place match		
Year	Host	Champions	Score	Runners-up	3rd place	Score	4th place
2010; Details	Sweden	United States	66–0	Canada	Finland	26–18	Germany
2013; Details	Finland	United States	64–0	Canada	Finland	20–19	Germany
2017; Details	Canada	United States	41–16	Canada	Mexico	19–8	Great Britain
2022; Details	Finland	United States	42–14	Great Britain	Finland	19–17	Canada
2026; Details	TBD		–			–	

=== Medal table ===
Rank	Nation	Gold	Silver	Bronze	Total
1	United States	4	0	0	4
2	Canada	0	3	0	3
3	Great Britain	0	1	0	1
4	Finland	0	0	3	3
5	Mexico	0	0	1	1
Totals (5 entries)		4	4	4	12

== Participating nations ==
Legend

- (gold) – Champions
- (silver) – Runners-up
- (bronze) – Third place
- 4–8 – 4th to 8th places
- •• – Qualified, but withdrew
- • – Did not qualify
- – Did not enter or withdrew
- XX – Country did not exist or national team was inactive
- – host nation

Participants
Team	2010 (Sweden) (6)	2013 (Finland) (6)	2017 (Canada) (6)	2022 (Finland) (8)
Australia			6	7
Austria	6			
Canada	Silver	Silver	Silver	4
Finland	Bronze	Bronze	5	Bronze
Great Britain			4	Silver
Germany	4	4		6
Mexico			Bronze	5
Spain		6		
Sweden	5	5		8
United States	Gold	Gold	Gold	Gold

== See also ==
- American football
- Women's football in the United States
- American football in the United States
- United States women's national American football team
- National Football League
