= Phoebe Schecter =

British-American gridiron player, coach and broadcaster

- Born: 24 August 1990 (age 36)
- Occupations: American football coach; Sports commentator; Flag football player; American football player
- Years active: 2013–present

Phoebe Schecter (born 24 August 1990) is a British-American NFL analyst, gridiron football player and coach best known for her work commentating for Sky Sports NFL coverage, being the first woman to become a British coach in the NFL, and being the former captain of the Great Britain women's national American football team.

== Biography ==
=== Early life and education ===
Schecter held dual citizenship from birth. Schecter's mother was British, giving her dual citizenship. She grew up in Ridgefield, Connecticut, and participated in equestrianism from a young age, adopting a pony when she was 13, moving to North Carolina to pursue a career in horse management for a few years, and going on to study equine business management at Post University. She also participated in Lacrosse.

=== Career ===
Schecter relocated to Cheshire, United Kingdom from the United States in 2012 at the age of 22, taking up a job at an equestrian centre near Congleton, where she was helping the Dutch Olympic team practice for 3-day eventing. In February 2013, Schecter attended trials for an American football team in Manchester. Prior to moving to the United Kingdom, Schecter was not a football fan and had not participated in contact sports. Schecter was one of the first members of the Great Britain women's national American football team, and would go on to be the captain. As captain, Schecter led the team to the final of the Women's European Championship of American football in 2015. She also captained the team at the 2019 European Championships, where they came third. Schecter contributed to the silver medal in the 2022 IFAF Women's World Championship, before retiring from the national team in 2024. As a player, Schecter stands 5 ft 4in and weighs 63 kg.

She was selected to represent Great Britain in the 2024 IFAF Women's Flag Football World Championship, where she was one of the team's longest-serving members.

Schecter is a linebacker and has played for the Birmingham Lions and the Staffordshire Surge. During her career progression, Schecter has moved towards strong safety.

Schecter has been the captain for Great Britain's Kabaddi team.

=== Coaching and broadcasting ===
In 2016, she took up an internship as a coach at the University of La Verne, and in 2017 she interned at the Buffalo Bills, thus making her the first woman British coach in the NFL, applying through the Bill Walsh Diversity Coaching Fellowship. Following this short stint during training camp, she was a volunteer coach and intern at Bryant Bulldogs football. She also interned with the Bills from 2018 to 2019. At the time, there were only three women coaches in the entire league. Following the season, she took a sabbatical to focus on growing the sport in the UK and involving herself in grassroots activities and consultancy.

Schecter was involved in broadcasting by 2018, starting with radio broadcasts. Schecter began contributing to Sky Sports NFL coverage in 2020. In 2022, Schecter presented her first live show as the current host was ill, as the first time that women had appeared on live Sky Sports NFL coverage. Schecter was pitchside for Super Bowl LVII. Schecter continues to present coverage on Sky Sports. In 2024, Schecter began writing a column for BBC Sport's NFL coverage.

=== Committee roles ===
Schecter has served on the committee of both the British American Football Association and the International Federation of American Football and is employed by the NFL as a flag football ambassador.
