= Women's European Championship of American football =

European Championship
- Sport: American football
- Founded: 2015
- Most recent champion: Finland (3rd title)
- Most titles: Finland (3 titles)
- Website: americanfootball.sport

Women's European Championship is a continental competition of American football contested by the member countries of IFAF Europe.

The tournament for the 2023–24 season was played in a round-robin format over a 2-year period instead of as a single tournament.

2025-26 tournament was played again in a round-robin format, culminating in gold medal game in August 2026. Participating teams were Spain, Great Britain, Finland and Germany.

== Results ==
Year	Host	Final			Third place match		
Year	Host	Winner	Score	Runner-up	3rd place	Score	4th place
2015; Details	Spain	Finland	50–12	Great Britain	Germany	26–7	Austria
2019; Details	United Kingdom	Finland		Sweden	Great Britain		Austria
2023-24; Details	Europe	Spain		Great Britain	Finland		Germany
2025-26; Details	Europe	Finland	6–0	Germany	Spain	GB withdraw	Great Britain

=== Medal table ===
Rank	Nation	Gold	Silver	Bronze	Total
1	Finland	3	0	1	4
2	Spain	1	0	1	2
3	Great Britain	0	2	1	3
4	Germany	0	1	1	2
5	Sweden	0	1	0	1
Totals (5 entries)		4	4	4	12

== Participating nations ==
Legend

- (gold) – Champions
- (silver) – Runners-up
- (bronze) – Third place
- 4–6 – 4th to 6th places
- •• – Qualified, but withdrew
- • – Did not qualify
- – Did not enter or withdrew
- XX – Country did not exist or national team was inactive
- – Host nation

Participants
Team	2015 (Spain) (6)	2019 (United Kingdom) (4)	2023-24 (Europe) (4)	2025-26 (Europe) (4)
Austria	4th	4th	-	-
Finland	Gold	Gold	Bronze	Gold
Great Britain	Silver	Bronze	Silver	4th
Germany	Bronze	-	4th	Silver
Spain	5th	-	Gold	Bronze
Sweden	6th	Silver	-	-

== See also ==
- Men's European Championship of American football
- European Junior Championship of American football
- IFAF European Flag Football Championship
