= 2010 IFAF Women's World Championship =

2010 edition of the IFAF Women's World Championship

Coordinates: 59°18′16″N 18°03′00″E

Tournament details
- Host nation: Sweden
- Dates: 27 June – 3 July
- No. of nations: 6
- Champions: United States (1st title)
- Runner-up: Canada
- Third-place: Finland

The 2010 IFAF Women's World Championship was the first world championship of American football for women. It was held in Stockholm, Sweden, from 26 June to 3 July 2010.

== Seeding ==
1. United States
2. Canada
3. Germany
4. Austria
5. Finland
6. Sweden

== Group stage ==
=== Group A ===
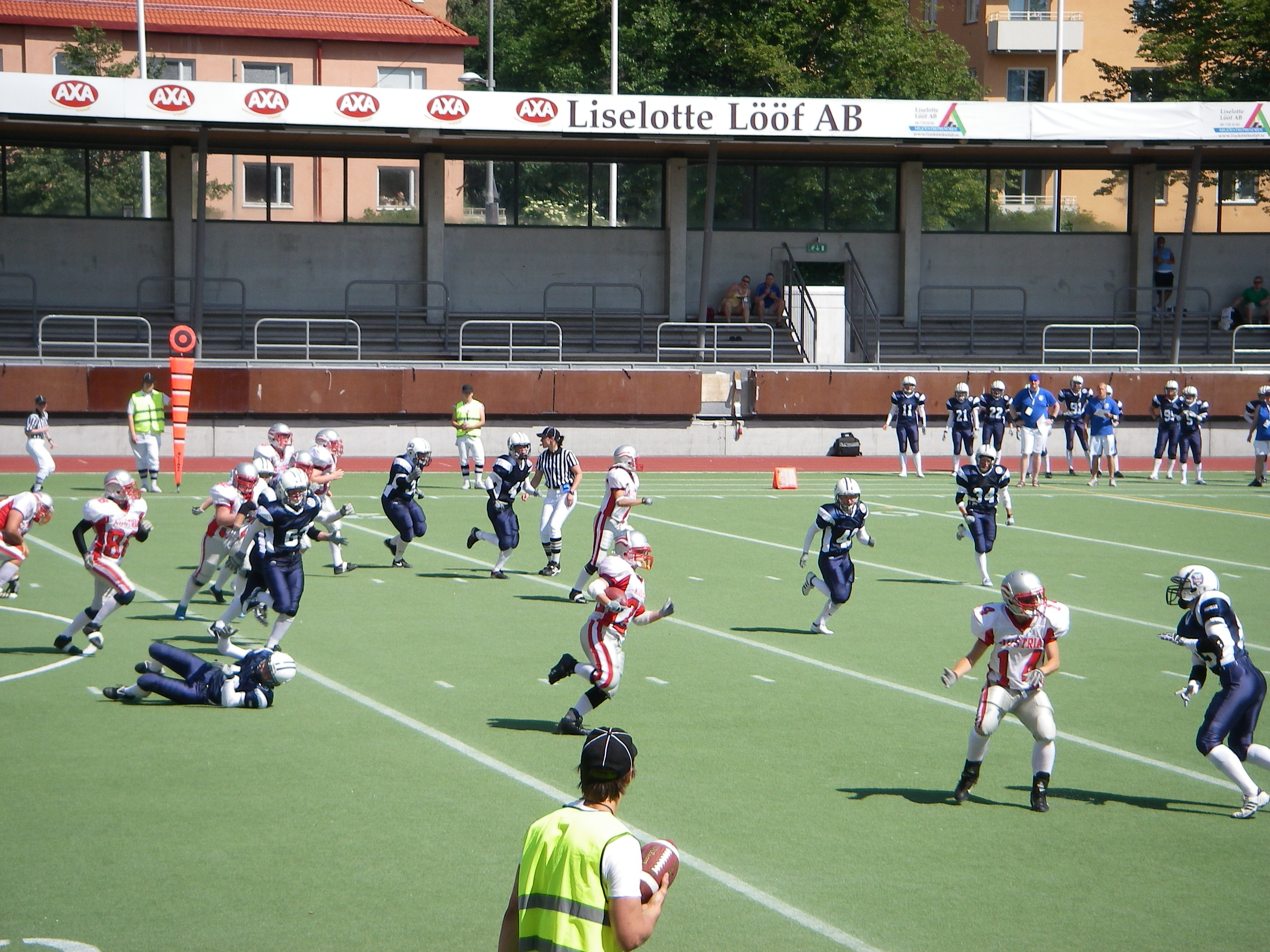
Game between Finland and Austria

Team	Pld	W	L	PF	PA
United States	2	2	0	135	0
Finland	2	1	1	50	88
Austria	2	0	2	16	113

Quarter	1	2	3	4	Total
Austria	0	0	0	0	0
United States	19	23	14	7	63

at Zinkensdamms IP

- Date: June 27
- Game time: 13:00
- Game attendance: 201
- Referee: G. Bogman
- Box Score

Quarter	1	2	3	4	Total
Finland	20	24	0	6	50
Austria	8	8	0	0	16

at Zinkensdamms IP

- Date: June 29
- Game time: 13:00
- Game attendance: 112
- Referee: A. McPhilomy
- Box Score

Quarter	1	2	3	4	Total
United States	13	21	19	19	72
Finland	0	0	0	0	0

at Zinkensdamms IP

- Date: July 1
- Game time: 18:00
- Game attendance: 405
- Referee: G. Bogman
- Box Score

=== Group B ===
Team	Pld	W	L	PF	PA
Canada	2	2	0	32	18
Germany	2	1	1	26	20
Sweden	2	0	2	6	26

Quarter	1	2	3	4	Total
Canada	0	6	6	0	12
Sweden	0	0	0	6	6

at Zinkensdamms IP

- Date: June 27
- Game time: 18:00
- Referee: A. McPhilomy
- Box Score

Quarter	1	2	3	4	Total
Sweden	0	0	0	0	0
Germany	0	7	0	7	14

at Zinkensdamms IP

- Date: June 29
- Game time: 18:00
- Game attendance: 514
- Referee: A. Tahtinen
- Box Score

Quarter	1	2	3	4	Total
Germany	0	6	0	6	12
Canada	0	14	6	0	20

at Zinkensdamms IP

- Date: July 1
- Game time: 13:00
- Game attendance: 178
- Referee: A. McPhilomy
- Box Score

=== 5th place ===
Quarter	1	2	3	4	Total
Sweden	0	8	6	6	20
Austria	6	6	0	6	18

at Zinkensdamms IP

- Date: July 3
- Game time: 11:00
- Game attendance: 432
- Referee: A. Tahtinen
- Box Score

=== 3rd place ===
Quarter	1	2	3	4	Total
Finland	14	12	0	0	26
Germany	0	0	6	12	18

at Zinkensdamms IP

- Date: July 3
- Game time: 15:00
- Referee: A. McPhilomy
- Box Score

=== Final ===
Quarter	1	2	3	4	Total
Canada	0	0	0	0	0
United States	22	29	9	6	66

at Zinkensdamms IP

- Date: July 3
- Game time: 19:00
- Game attendance: 707
- Referee: G. Bogman
- Box Score

== Final standings ==
Pos	Team	Games	Win	Lose	Points for	Points against	Difference
1st place, gold medalist(s)	United States	3	3	0	201	0	+201
2nd place, silver medalist(s)	Canada	3	2	1	32	84	-52
3rd place, bronze medalist(s)	Finland	3	2	1	76	106	-30
4	Germany	3	1	2	44	46	-2
5	Sweden	3	1	2	26	44	-18
6	Austria	3	0	3	34	133	-99

== All Stars team ==
Tournament All Stars team was selected based on coaches voting and overall performance.

2010 IFAF Women's World Championship All Stars - 1st Team
Position	Player	Team
QB	Sami Grisafe	United States
RB	Jessica Springer	United States
RB	Marie Michelitsch	Austria
WR	Rusty Sowers	United States
WR	Adrienne Smith	United States
WR	Sari Kuosmanen	Finland
OL	Kelly Barker	United States
OL	Keesha Brooks	United States
OL	Kirsi Kauhanen	Finland
OL	Wienke Moser	Germany
OL	Tiffany Dinges	Germany
DL	Jeanamarie Fisher	United States
DL	Knengi Martin	United States
DL	Kimberley Marks	United States
DL	Michaela Rowett	Sweden
LB	Saskia Strbrny	Austria
LB	Pillan Plass	Sweden
LB	Jennifer DeGuise	Canada
DB	Sharon Vasquez	United States
DB	Alberta Fitcheard-Brydson	United States
DB	Anette Bäckman	Finland
DB	Teresa Yanke	Canada
K/P	Gabriele Duvinage	Germany
KR/PR	Rusty Sowers	United States
Coach	John Kooneck	United States

2010 IFAF Women's World Championship All Stars - 2nd Team
Position	Player	Team
QB	Jenny Schmidt	United States
RB	Merita Bruun	Finland
RB	Julie Paetsch	Canada
WR	Stephanie Konecny	Austria
WR	Jeanette Beastoch	Germany
WR	Anna Persson	Sweden
OL	Roseanna Smith	United States
OL	Dawn Pederson	United States
OL	Jamie Menzyk	United States
OL	Nora Ahokas	Finland
OL	Merle Ziemann	Finland
DL	Olivia Griswold	United States
DL	Jessica Neues	Germany
DL	Nina Kiviharju	Sweden
DL	Danielle Golay	United States
LB	Hanna Saari	Finland
LB	Katri Laine	Finland
LB	Simone Dietrich	Germany
DB	Christina Goulet	Canada
DB	Jennifer Welter	United States
DB	Emma Bendorf	Sweden
DB	Maija Isomaa	Finland
K/P	Emily Williams	United States
KR/PR	Susanne Erdmann	Germany
Coach	Teemu Kuusisto	Finland
