= Great Britain women's national American football team =

Great Britain

The Great Britain women's national American football team are the official American football senior national team of Great Britain.

== History ==
The team competed at the 2015 European Championship, where they finished second after losing to Finland in the final game. They then participated in the 2017 World Championship, where they finished fourth after losing to Mexico in the bronze medal game. Great Britain hosted the 2019 European Championship, where they won a bronze medal. Great Britain forced a three-way tie with winners and runners-up Finland and Sweden, but finished third due to the tournament's tiebreakers. Phoebe Schecter was the captain for both the 2015 and 2019 competitions.

At the 2022 World Championship, Great Britain made it to the final following a winning touchdown with only two seconds to go in the game. In doing so, Great Britain became the first European team to play in an IFAF World Championship final.
