= Katie Sowers =

American football player and coach (born 1986)

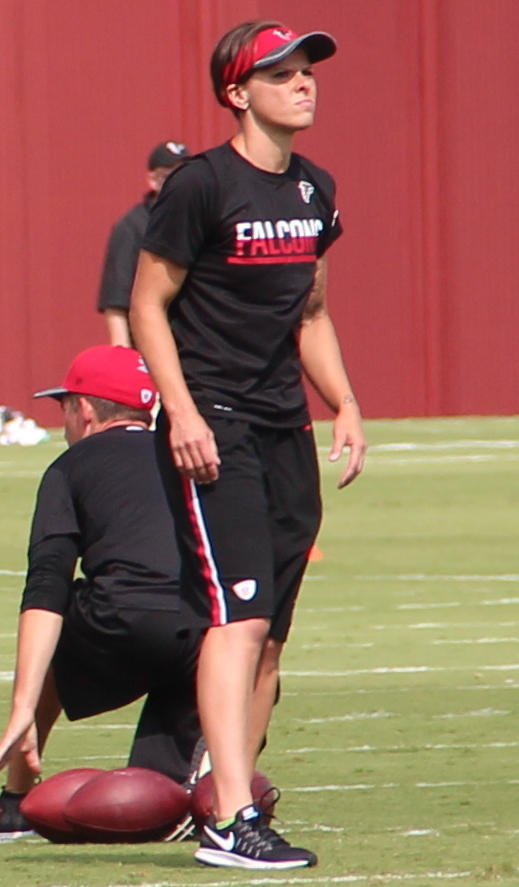
- Sowers in 2016

Personal information
- Born: August 7, 1986 (age 40); Hesston, Kansas, U.S.

Career information
- High school: Hesston (KS)
- College: Central Missouri

Career history
- Atlanta Falcons (2016) Training camp assistant; San Francisco 49ers (2017) Seasonal offensive assistant; San Francisco 49ers (2017–2020) Offensive assistant; Kansas City Chiefs (2021) Offensive assistant; Ottawa (KS) (2021–2026) Flag football defensive coordinator; Nebraska (2027–Onwards) Flag football associate head coach

Awards and highlights
- IFAF Women's World Champion (2013)

Katherine Marie Sowers (born August 7, 1986) is an American football coach, formerly in the National Football League (NFL). She was the first openly gay and first female coach in Super Bowl history. Sowers began her American football career playing in the Women's Football Alliance (WFA). She joined the NFL in 2016 as a coach for the Atlanta Falcons and then with the San Francisco 49ers, before joining the Kansas City Chiefs in 2021. Sowers currently works in the athletic department of Ottawa University.

== Early life and education ==
Sowers was born on August 7, 1986, in Hesston, Kansas, where she attended a Mennonite church with her family. Her lazy eye was fixed during childhood. She began playing American football at the age of eight.

During 2004, Sower's basketball team was third in the 3A championship held by the KSHSAA. That year, she was fifth in the 3A javelin event during the KSHSAA's Girls State Track and Field Championship. Sowers began her post-secondary education at Hesston College. She then transferred to Goshen College where she competed in javelin at the NAIA women's outdoor track and field championship held during 2008 and 2009. While there, she also participated in basketball and soccer. After completing her Bachelor of Arts from Goshen College, she attended the University of Central Missouri and studied kinesiology. She earned her Masters of Science in 2013.

== Career ==
=== Playing career ===
While a student at Goshen, Sowers began her football career playing for the West Michigan Mayhem and the Kansas City Titans in the Women's Football Alliance (WFA). While with the Titans, Sowers was a member of the United States women's national American football team that won the 2013 IFAF Women's World Championship. Sowers continued to play in the WFA until her 2016 retirement due to a hip injury.

=== Coaching career ===
In 2016, Sowers joined the National Football League as a wide receivers coaching intern with the Atlanta Falcons. In 2017, Sowers moved to the San Francisco 49ers as part of the Bill Walsh Diversity Coaching Fellowship. She became a seasonal intern before being converted to full-time offensive assistant. In her first season, the 49ers won the NFC Championship, sending the team to Super Bowl LIV and allowing Sowers to become the first female and first openly gay coach in a Super Bowl. Her contract with the 49ers expired after the 2020 season. She joined the coaching staff of the Kansas City Chiefs prior to the 2021 NFL season. In October 2021, Sowers was appointed as the director of athletic strategic initiatives at Ottawa University, where she also coaches the women's flag football team. Additionally, between 2023 and 2024, Sowers was the head coach of the Italy women's national flag football team.

In February 2026, it was announced that Sowers would become the associate head coach of the University of Nebraska–Lincoln's newly established women's flag football team for the 2027 season, following her sister Liz who was announced as Nebraska's head coach; both sisters would finish the 2026 season with Ottawa before joining Nebraska.

== Personal life ==
Before the start of the 2017 NFL season, Sowers came out publicly as a lesbian and became the first openly LGBT coach in the National Football League. Sowers was refused a volunteer coaching position at Goshen in 2009 because of her sexual orientation. In 2020 the president of the college apologized for rejecting her.

Sowers' twin sister, Liz, played football as a wide receiver, and now works with Sowers as the head coach of the Ottawa women's flag football team and will join Sowers as the head coach of the Nebraska women's flag football team.
