= Sami Grisafe =

American singer and songwriter (born 1985)

Medal record

Women's football

Representing United States

IFAF World Women's Championships
Gold medal – first place	2010 Sweden	Team competition
Gold medal – first place	2013 Finland	Team competition
Gold medal – first place	2017 British Columbia	Team competition

Samantha Linda "Sami" Grisafe (born March 26, 1985) is an American singer, songwriter, musician, women's football player, activist, and actor. In 2012 Grisafe released Atlantis, a full-length studio album featuring eleven upbeat pop tracks. The album received six Grammy pre-nominations and has a few Grammy Award-winning collaborators associated with it, such as blues artist Sugar Blue (Rolling Stones) and producer Ricciano Lumpkins (TLC, P.O.D., Mya). Sami also won the Chicago Music Award for Best Rock Entertainer 2012.

Grisafe helped the United States capture the gold medal at the 2010 IFAF Women's World Championship in Stockholm, Sweden, along with the 2013 IFAF Women's World Championship in Vantaa, Finland. She was named the Tournament MVP at the 2013 IFAF Women's World Games in Vantaa, Finland. Grisafe also sang the National Anthem prior to the gold medal game in Finland. A video of the performance went viral. Buzzfeed called her performance, "The most inspiring combination of sports and music you will ever see."

Grisafe received the Dare2BDifferent award by the Action Icon Awards in Los Angeles, CA in Fall 2015. She was given the award for her achievements in football and music.

== Early life ==
Grisafe was born on March 26, 1985, in Loma Linda, California, to Gregory and Kimberly Grisafe, who performed country music across the Southern California region. She has a younger brother, Kyle Grisafe. Grisafe's song "Two of Hearts" is an autobiographical account of her and her brother's childhood accompanying their parents to their shows.

Although music was prevalent in Grisafe's life from a young age, most of her focus and achievements were in sports. She began playing baseball at age 5 and later became the first girl in her hometown, Redlands, CA, to make a boy's all-star team. In 1995 Grisafe began playing youth football. She threw 12 for 15 passes in the first football game she ever played.

Grisafe also received accolades in theater. She won first place in monologue performance at the California State Thespian Festival in 2002 and a performance scholarship in 2003. Grisafe was named Homecoming Queen in 2003.

Grisafe moved to Chicago with a scholarship from the Theatre Conservatory at Chicago College of Performing Arts, Roosevelt University. During her senior year of college, Grisafe read an article about the women's tackle football team, Chicago Force. Grisafe tried out, made the team, and started at Quarterback in her first game the day after she graduated from college in Spring 2007. Grisafe worked as a bartender after graduating from college.

== Musical career ==
Music was a part of Sami's life from an early age. She went to gigs with her parents across Southern California. She received her first guitar when she was 10. Grisafe began writing songs when she was 18. When she went to college she was roomed with her future best friend, Linsea Moon Waugh, with whom she began performing and co-writing songs. Grisafe and Waugh performed throughout Chicago at coffee shops.

Upon graduation from college, Grisafe's football schedule prevented her from auditioning for plays. She turned her attention to music. Grisafe landed her first gig/residency at Lonie Walker's Underground Wonder Bar, after an impromptu audition on a stoop next to the club. The venue owner, Lonie Walker, overheard Grisafe playing an original song and asked her to sit in. This venue would later provide a residency for Waugh and Grisafe.

In 2010, after returning from the International Federation of American Football's first Women's World Tackle Football Tournament in Stockholm, Sweden, Grisafe was commissioned by the Women's Football Alliance to write and record a song for the league. Grisafe composed "4th and Inches" inspired by her experience in Sweden.

Grisafe contacted a college drummer friend, Evan Ryan, to help her put together a band for the recording of the album. Ryan called on Matt Hines and Andy Neel. After two rehearsals, The Wick was on a flight to Dallas to record a full-length album comprising "4th and Inches" and 13 other songs written by Grisafe and arranged by Ryan, Hines, and Neel, entitled The Wick on Wax. However, the league deal fell through because of a change in ownership and the album lost its support. The Wick performed in Chicago for a year before breaking up in late 2011.

Grisafe continued to play in venues all over Chicago, including: Metro, Double Door, City Winery Chicago, and Cubby Bear in Wrigleyville. In 2011, Grisafe had another undercover audition while bartending at The Closet in Lakeview. She played music in between making drinks for her regular crowd.

In 2011, Grisafe met Kathy Kuras who contacted Grisafe about a project that "doesn't pay much but would be a great creative experience." The project was called I Hate Tommy Finch, a live play filmed and released as a web-series. Kuras also brought in her cousin, former Universal recording artists and Los Angeles based songwriter, Shannon Nicole, a former Universal Recording artist, and Jaclyn Rada, a local Chicago pianist.

Grisafe wrote the title track of the soundtrack, ATLANTIS, inspired by the script for I Hate Tommy Finch. ATLANTIS was produced in Chicago by Grammy Award Winning Producer, Ricco Lumpkins, Kuras, and Grisafe. The album was a three-artist collaboration with Grisafe, Shannon Nicole, and Jaclyn Rada. It also included a featured performance by reggae rapper, Viper and former Rolling Stone's harmonica player and Grammy Award Winner, Sugar Blue. The album was released on Vicious Muse Records, founded by Kuras and Grisafe.

ATLANTIS received 6 Grammy Pre-Nominations, 5 of which were for songs written by Grisafe. Including her autobiographical song featuring Sugar Blue, "Two of Hearts". A song about her and her brother's childhood with performing parents.

From 2012 to 2014 Kuras and Grisafe continued to work together booking small tours through the Midwest, East Coast, and West Coast. Some notable venues include: Whisky A-Go-Go in Los Angeles, Chicago Pride, and during SXSW at a few unofficial showcases.

Grisafe received the Chicago Music Award for Best Rock Entertainer in early 2013.

In 2014 Kuras and Grisafe began working on the next project, Brand New Fairy Tale. They recorded two singles, the title track and "Tiny Victories". "Brand New Fairy Tale", a song inspired by the fight for marriage equality, was first performed at the March on Springfield, IL in Fall 2013. Brand New Fairy Tale is currently in production and songs from the album will be used in a documentary about Grisafe, projected to be released in 2017.

In January 2016, Grisafe moved to Los Angeles to put more focus on her music career. She is the host and regular feature performer as well as production and booking manager of SunSeshLA, a weekly music and comedy showcase in LA.

== National anthem ==
Grisafe first arranged her version of the Star-Spangled Banner for a contest to sing at Wrigley Field in 2008. She received 2nd place in the competition. She began singing the National Anthem for Chicago Force games before taking the field.

In 2013 at the gold medal game, U.S.A. vs Canada, Grisafe was asked to sing the Star-Spangled Banner. A video of her performance later went viral. The Huffington Post called her performance, "one of the most stunning versions of the "Star Spangled Banner" we've ever heard." A photo of her performance was featured in several publications including ESPN W.

Laura Ricketts, co-owner of the Chicago Cubs, made a deal with Grisafe: if the Chicago Force won the National Championship in 2013, Ricketts would honor the team during a Cubs game at Wrigley and give Grisafe the opportunity of singing the National Anthem before the game. Ricketts kept her promise. Grisafe performed the National Anthem and Chicago Force were honored at Wrigley Field on September 3, 2013.

In Fall 2013 Grisafe received a call from the Illinois Governor's Office to perform the National Anthem at the Bill Signing for the Marriage Fairness Act. She was personally requested by Governor Quinn.

== Football career ==
=== High school ===
Grisafe attended Redlands High School where she was named captain of the Freshman Football team by her teammates. She became the first female Quarterback to compete in a varsity football game sanctioned by the California Interscholastic Federation Division I in 2000. While at Redlands High School she lettered in varsity football, softball, and volleyball.

=== Chicago Force ===
In 2007, Grisafe joined the Chicago Force (competing in the IWFL). At the time, she was studying dramatic arts at Roosevelt University.

During the 2011 Women's Football Alliance season, she had 1,746 passing yards and 24 touchdown passes.

The 2012 campaign resulted in Chicago's fourth undefeated season in franchise history. On August 4, 2012, Grisafe and the Chicago Force competed in the WFA championship against the San Diego Surge. It was a historic game because it was the first played on an NFL field (held at Heinz Field in Pittsburgh). Chicago lost to San Diego in the final minutes of the 4th quarter, 40–36. Grisafe was named Co-MVP of the game. In 2013, the Force went undefeated, winning the W.F.A. National Championship in San Diego, CA at the former home of the San Diego Chargers. Chicago beat the Dallas Diamonds 81–34. Grisafe finished the 2013 WFA and Team USA season with a combination of 4,301 passing yards and 57 touchdown passes. In 2014 Grisafe fell to an injury in the 4th quarter of a game against the D.C. Divas. Grisafe suffered a contact ACL and Meniscus tear. Chicago beat DC 41–27. She returned for two games in the post season prior to surgery. She started in the Conference Championship vs. the Boston Militia. Chicago lost. Grisafe retired at the end of the 2014 season.

Grisafe came out of retirement in early 2017 for one more season with the Chicago Force.

=== Team USA ===
Against Austria on June 27, 2010, Grisafe had three touchdown passes. In a July 1 contest against Finland, she logged 154 passing yards, including a pass of 59 yards.

Grisafe was featured in the 2013 documentary, Tackle the World: Tough Game, Tougher Women.

2010 A member of Team USA at the 2010 IFAF Women's World Championship, she threw for 309 passing yards in three games. She had an efficiency rating of 262.53 while throwing for six touchdown passes and completing 12 of 22 passes.

Game 1 – U.S. vs Austria: Grisafe was named captain for the first game in International play by the U.S. Women's Tackle Football. Grisafe threw the first Touchdown pass in history, 52 yards, to Adrienne Smith. Grisafe threw 3 TD passes and earned one rushing TD. U.S.A. beat Austria 63–0. Game 2 – U.S. vs Finland: In a July 1 contest against Finland, she logged 154 passing yards, including a pass of 59 yards. U.S.A. beat Finland 72–0. Game 3 – U.S. vs Canada (Gold Medal Game): U.S. beat Canada 66–0. Grisafe threw the only TD pass in the game to Rusty Sowers for 31 yards at the end of the 1st half.

2013 Game 1 – U.S.A. vs Sweden : U.S.A. beat Sweden. Grisafe completed 12-of-16 passes for 220 yards with three touchdowns. She also added a rushing touchdown. Game 2 – U.S.A. vs Germany: U.S.A. beat Germany 107–7.

Game 3 – U.S.A. vs Canada: U.S.A. beat Canada 64–0. American quarterbacks Sami Grisafe and Karen Mulligan combined for 23-of-28 passing for 367 yards.

Grisafe was named the overall tournament MVP – threw three touchdowns in the final to complete her three-game tournament total of 626 passing yards, nine touchdown passes and a rushing touchdown.

2017 Game 1 - U.S.A. vs Mexico : U.S.A. beat Mexico 29-0 Game 2 - U.S.A. vs Finland : U.S.A. beat Finland 48-0 Game 3 - U.S.A. vs Canada: U.S.A. beat Canada 41-16

Grisafe was named the Offensive MVP of the tournament

== Acting career ==
Sami Grisafe was a principal cast member in an ensemble, mistral-style play entitled, Railroad Backward, written and directed by Kestutis Nakas. Railroad Backward premiered in Chicago at The Prop Theatre and was later performed in New York's East Village at The Club at LaMama, a theatre famous for experimental theatrical pieces.

== Media and feature stories ==
Fuse

Chicago Tribune

Fox

Curve Magazine and

The Advocate

== Talks and speaking engagements ==
Grisafe spoke at the Museum of Contemporary Art in Chicago for the Cusp Conference 2015. She spoke about breaking formulas and "writing a brand new fairy tale".

She gave an acceptance speech at the Action Icon Awards about following passion regardless of what is popular in Fall 2015.

She spoke at a dinner for the Pro-Football Hall of Fame in Summer 2015 about her experience on the gridiron.

Grisafe also spoke at her alma mater's Athletic Hall of Fame induction at Redlands Senior High School, where she discussed how her time at the school prepared her for her career.

== Activism ==
Grisafe has many songs with social change messages. She wrote "Be Somebody" (formally entitled Trevor) which was inspired by the efforts of The Trevor Project.

Kathy Kuras and Grisafe's production company, Brand New Fairytale Productions (previously Vicious Muse), produced and managed the stage for the March on Springfield for Marriage Equality. She composed "Brand New Fairy Tale" inspired by the Marriage Equality Movement and first performed the song at the marriage equality march in Springfield, IL. She performed the National Anthem at the bill signing of the Marriage Fairness Act in Chicago, IL in November 2013.

Kuras and Grisafe's Production company, Brand New Fairy Tale Productions, produced and ran the stage for a homeless teen Sleep Out fundraiser held in Chicago in Fall 2015. Grisafe also performed and spent the night in the snow.

Grisafe has donated performances and/or volunteered for several organizations including: Over the Rainbow for Gilda's Club, Howard Brown Health Center, and the Lesbian Community Cancer Project.

== Personal life ==
Grisafe is openly gay. She came out when she was 21 years old and has been a pro-active member of the LGBTQ community since.

== Awards and honors ==
=== Football ===
- 8-Time Player of the Game (Chicago Force)
- 2-time Offensive Player of the Year (Chicago Force)
- 3-time Team MVP (Chicago Force)
- WFA League Offensive MVP (Women's Football Alliance)
- League Offensive Player of the Year (Women's Football Alliance)
- League Offensive Player of the Year (Independent Women's Football League)
- IWFL All-American (2007, 2008, 2009, 2010)
- WFA All-American (2011, 2012, 2013, 2017)
- 2-time Championship Game MVP (Women's Football Alliance)
- Chicago Force Team Captain (2008, 2009, 2010, 2012, 2013, 2014, 2017)
- Team USA Captain (2010, 2013, 2017)
- Offensive Player Game MVP U.S.A. vs. Sweden (International Federation of American Football)
- Tournament MVP Vantaa, Finland 2013 (International Federation of American Football)
- Tournament Offensive MVP Langley, B.C. 2017 (International Federation of American Football)
- 2014 Redlands High School Athletic Hall of Fame Inductee

=== Music ===
- 2013 Chicago Music Award – Rock Entertainer of the Year
- Five Grammy Award pre-nominations for songs written and performed by Grisafe on ATLANTIS.

=== Football and music ===
- Dare2BDifferent Award
- TCW 100 Women of Inspiration

=== LGBTQ ===
- 5 Out Lesbian Athletes, Curve Magazine
- Top 10 Chicago Lesbians to Look Out for in 2012, The L Stop
- Top 10 Chicago LGBT Sports Moments of 2014, Windy City Times

=== Acting ===
- 1st place in monologue performance (California State Thespian Conference)
- Honor Thespian (1,000+ hours in Theatre)
- Bachelor of Fine Arts Degree with honors in Theatre from Chicago College of Performing Arts at Roosevelt University.
