= Kathryn Smith (American football) =

American football coach from the United States

Career information
- High school: Christian Brothers Academy (DeWitt, New York)
- College: St. John's (NY)

Career history
- New York Jets (2003–2004) Game-day/special events intern; New York Jets (2005–2006) College scouting intern; New York Jets (2007–2013) Player personnel assistant; New York Jets (2014) Administrative assistant; Buffalo Bills (2015) Administrative assistant; Buffalo Bills (2016) Special teams quality control

Kathryn Smith (born 1985 or 1986) is an American football coach. She was the first full-time female coach in NFL history. Smith was also the only woman to ever hold a full-time coaching position in the NFL until the San Francisco 49ers hired Katie Sowers in 2017.

== Early life ==
Smith grew up in DeWitt, New York, a suburb of Syracuse, and attended the Christian Brothers Academy. After graduating from CBA in 2003 she went to St. John's University in New York City. Smith majored in Sport Management and served as a student manager of the men's basketball team.

== Career ==
Smith began interning for the New York Jets while attending St. John's, becoming a game-day/special events intern in 2003 and then a college scouting intern in 2005. She became a player personnel assistant in 2007. She then became an administrative assistant in 2014 and joined the Bills as an administrative assistant in 2015. The Bills promoted her to special teams quality control coach on January 20, 2016, replacing Michael Hamlin. She was the first woman to be a full-time coach in the NFL. After the dismissal of Rex Ryan, Smith was not retained by new coach Sean McDermott heading into the 2017 season.

== See also ==
- Jennifer Welter
- Sarah Thomas (American football official)
