= Finland women's national American football team =

Medal record

Women's American football

Representing Finland

World Championships
Bronze medal – third place	2010 Sweden	
Bronze medal – third place	2013 Finland	
Bronze medal – third place	2022 Finland	

European Championships
Gold medal – first place	2015 Spain	
Gold medal – first place	2019 Great Britain	
Gold medal – first place	2025-26 Europe	
Bronze medal – third place	2023-24 Europe	
Gold medal – first place	2025-26 Europe	

The Finland women's national American football team is the official American football senior national team of Finland.

== History ==
The team competed at the 2013 IFAF Women's World Championship, where they finished third after beating Germany 20–19. They also won bronze in 2010 and 2022 World Championships.

Finland won the 2015 European Championship against Great Britain, the 2019 European Championship against Sweden and the 2025-26 European Championship against Germany. The team also won bronze in 2023-24 European Championship.
