= Germany women's national American football team =

Senior national football team of Germany

Medal record

Women's American football

Representing Germany

European Championships
Bronze medal – third place	2015 Spain	
Silver medal – second place	2025-26 Europe	

The Germany women's national American football team is the official American football senior national team of Germany.

== History ==
The team competed at the 2013 IFAF Women's World Championship, where they finished fourth after losing to Finland 20–19. They won bronze in 2015 European Championship after defeating Austria.

In 2025-2026 Women's European Championship of American football Germany placed second after a tight 6-0 loss against Finland.
