= 2013 IFAF Women's World Championship =

2013 edition of the IFAF Women's World Championship

Tournament details
- Host nation: Finland
- Dates: 30 June – 6 July
- No. of nations: 6
- Champions: United States (2nd title)
- Runner-up: Canada
- Third-place: Finland

The 2013 IFAF Women's World Championship was the second IFAF Women's World Championship, an American football competition for women. It took place between 30 June and 6 July 2013. The tournament was hosted at the ISS Stadion in Vantaa, Finland. The defending champion, the United States, won its second title after defeating Canada 64–0 in the final. Host team Finland won the bronze medal.

== Participating teams ==
Team	Finals appearance	Last appearance	Best appearance
United States	2nd	2010	1st (2010)
Canada	2nd	2010	2nd (2010)
Finland	2nd	2010	3rd (2010)
Germany	2nd	2010	4th (2010)
Sweden	2nd	2010	5th (2010)
Spain	1st	—	—

== Group stage ==
=== Group A ===
Team	Pld	W	L	PF	PA
United States	2	2	0	191	7
Germany	2	1	1	32	121
Sweden	2	0	2	14	109

Date	Kickoff	Home	Result	Visitor
June 30	20:00	United States	84–0	Sweden
July 2	16:00	Sweden	14–25	Germany
July 4	16:00	Germany	7–107	United States

=== Group B ===
Team	Pld	W	L	PF	PA
Canada	2	2	0	84	12
Finland	2	1	1	59	34
Spain	2	0	2	0	97

Date	Kickoff	Home	Result	Visitor
June 30	16:00	Finland	47–0	Spain
July 2	20:00	Spain	0–50	Canada
July 4	20:00	Canada	34–12	Finland

Quarter	1	2	3	4	Total
Spain	0	0	0	0	0
Finland	16	12	7	12	47

at ISS Stadion, Vantaa

- Date: June 30
- Game time: 16:00 EEST (UTC+3)
- Game weather: Sunny, 25°C
- Game attendance: 515
- Referee: A McPhilomy
- Report

Game information

Scoring
1st Quarter

- FIN – T Salo 15-yard run (J Virtanen rush), 06:45. Finland 8–0. 6 plays, 45 yards, 2:45.
- FIN – S Kuosmanen 19-yard pass from T Salo (J Virtanen rush), 03:42. Finland 16–0. 4 plays, 49 yards, 1:36.

2nd Quarter

- FIN – E Seppala 34-yard run (T Salo pass failed), 05:26. Finland 22–0. 1 play, 34 yards, 0:10.
- FIN – S Kuosmanen 49-yard pass from T Salo (T Salo pass failed), 03:01. Finland 28–0. 4 plays, 62 yards, 0:51.

3rd Quarter

- FIN – J Linden 27-yard pass from T Salo (J Luhtala kick), 04:36. Finland 35–0. 3 plays, 29 yards, 0:56.

4th Quarter

- FIN – J-J Seiles 21-yard pass from T Salo (J Luhtala kick failed), 07:02. Finland 41–0. 7 plays, 70 yards, 3:13.
- FIN – J Linden 13-yard pass from L Hautakangas (J Luhtala kick failed), 02:04. Finland 47–0. 1 play, 13 yards, 0:07.

Leading passers

- FIN – T Salo – 6/18, 116 yards, 4 TD
- ESP – M Rafecas – 6/13, 22 yards

Leading rushers

- FIN – K Nirhamo – 5 rushes, 64 yards
- ESP – M Arroyo – 6 rushes, 14 yards

Leading receivers

- FIN – S Kuosmanen – 3 rec, 70 yards, 2 TD
- ESP – M Arroyo – 2 rec, 5 yards, 1 TD

Officials

- Referee: A McPhilomy
- Umpire: K Milojkovic
- Head Linesman: C Nichols
- Line Judge: J Tybiszewska
- Field Judge: S Sassatelli
- Side Judge: D Kustanci
- Back Judge: L Hill

== Placement games ==
Game	Date	Kickoff	Home	Result	Visitor
5th place	July 6	11:00	Sweden	64–0	Spain
Bronze medal	July 6	15:00	Germany	19–20	Finland
Golden medal	July 6	19:00	United States	64–0	Canada

== All Stars Team ==
2013 IFAF Women's World Championship All Stars
	Position	Team	Number	Player
Offense	QB	United States	15	Sami Grisafe
Offense	RB	Germany	21	Susanne Erdmann
Offense	RB	United States	3	Odessa Jenkins
Offense	WR	United States	83	Holly Peterson
Offense	WR	United States	10	Adrienne Smith
Offense	WR	Finland	80	Sari Kuosmanen
Offense	OL	United States	63	Jamie Menzyk
Offense	OL	United States	74	Rebecca Worsham
Offense	OL	United States	79	Dawn Pederson
Offense	OL	Canada	68	Kimberly Grubb
Offense	OL	Finland	60	Merle Ziemann
Defense	DL	United States	81	Jennifer Deering
Defense	DL	United States	47	Knengi Martin
Defense	DL	Finland	47	Tea Törmänen
Defense	LB	United States	44	Victoria Eddy
Defense	LB	Spain	25	Patricia Meixide Vazquez
Defense	LB	United States	45	Jennifer Plummer
Defense	LB	Canada	7	Julie Paetsch
Defense	DB	United States	8	Sharon Vasquez
Defense	DB	Sweden	1	Emma Benndorf
Defense	DB	Finland	40	Anette Backman
Defense	DB	United States	16	Kathrine Sowers
Special Teams	PUNT RET	United States	25	Cassie Brick
Special Teams	KICK RET	Canada	4	Julie David
Special Teams	KICKER	Sweden	4	Elina Holm
Coach	COACH	United States		John Konecki

== See also ==
- American Football Association of Finland
- American football
