= Sweden women's national American football team =

Medal record

Women's American football

Representing Sweden

European Championships
| Silver medal – second place | 2019 Great Britain | |

The Sweden women's national American football team is the official American football senior national team of Sweden.

== History ==
The team competed at the 2013 IFAF Women's World Championship, where they finished fifth after beating Spain 64–0.

During the 2019 European Championship the team earned a silver medal, while Finland won the tournament.
