= Houston Energy =

Women's American football team

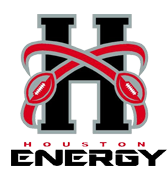
- Founded: 2000
- League: Women's Football Alliance
- Team history: Houston Energy (WPFL) (2000–2008); Houston Energy (IWFL) (2009–2018); Houston Energy (WFA) (2019–present)
- Based in: Galena Park, Texas
- Stadium: Dement Field
- Colors: Red, black, white
- Owner: Brian Wiggins
- Head coach: Brian Wiggins
- Championships: 4 (WPFL: 2000, 2001, 2002) (IWFL: 2018)

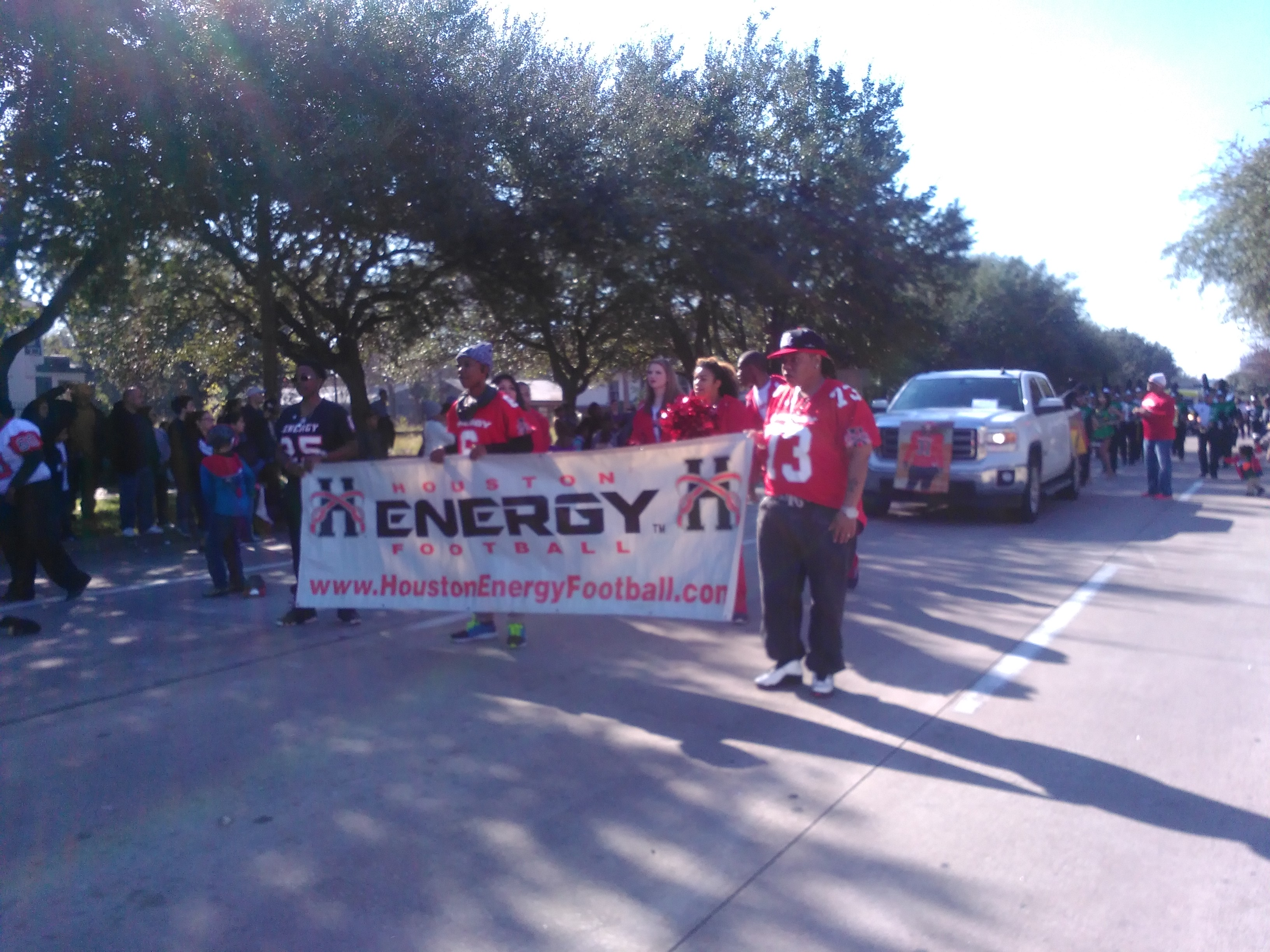
Houston Energy at the 2016 MLK Day Parade in Midtown Houston

The Houston Energy is a football team in the Women's Football Alliance (WFA). They play at Dement Field in Galena Park, Texas in east Houston. The team was founded in 2000 under the now defunct Women’s Professional Football League (WPFL) until 2008, then the now defunct Independent Women’s Football League (IWFL) from 2009 to 2018, and finally joined the WFA in 2019. The current owner is Brian Wiggins.

== History ==
The Houston Energy is the longest-running active women’s gridiron franchise in the state of Texas, alongside the Austin Outlaws, also founded in 2000. The team was founded by Robin Howington, a local businesswoman and defensive player. In its inaugural year, over 400 players tried out for the team. Howington led the team to three back-to-back national championships between its inaugural year and 2003 in the WPFL. In 2004, Howington sold the team to fellow players Karen Mones and Stacy Agee. Howington remained as the team’s General Manager to assist in the transition. The same year, the new owners brought on former NFL player Brian Wiggins as the wide receivers coach. In 2006, Wiggins purchased the team and began his tenure as head coach. In the first two years under Wiggins, the team made back-to-back appearances in the WPFL championship, falling to the Dallas Diamonds and So Cal Scorpions respectively.

In 2009, the team affiliated with the IWFL upon the WPFL’s dissolution. The Energy won its fourth national title in 2018, the final season of the IWFL.

The team affiliated with the WFA in the 2019 season, beginning as a Division II team. The WFA cancelled the 2020 season due to the COVID-19 pandemic. In the following years, the Houston Energy rattled off two runner-up national champion seasons and ascended to the WFA PRO division in 2023 alongside Division II champion Mile High Blaze.

== All-time records ==
Season records
Season	W	L	T	Finish	Playoff results
Houston Energy (WPFL)
2000	4	2	0	1st American West	Won American Conference Qualifier (Colorado); Won American Conference Championship (Minnesota); Won WPFL Championship (New England)
2001	10	0	0	1st American West	Won American Conference Championship (Opponent Unknown); Won WPFL Championship (Austin)
2002	10	0	0	1st American Conference	Won American Conference Championship (Arizona); Won WPFL Championship (Wisconsin)
2003	7	2	0	2nd National South	--
2004	8	4	0	2nd American South	Won American Conference Wild Card (Long Beach); Lost American Conference Championship (Dallas)
2005	4	4	0	2nd American South	Lost Divisional Playoffs (Dallas)
2006	7	2	0	1st National East	Won National Conference Championship (Wisconsin); Lost WPFL Championship (Dallas)
2007	8	2	0	1st National Central	Won National Conference Championship (Wisconsin); Lost WPFL Championship (So Cal)
2008	Did not play				
Houston Energy (IWFL)
2009	2	6	0	4th Tier I East South Atlantic	--
2010	3	3	0	4th Tier I West Midwest	--
2011	5	3	0	1st Tier l East South Atlantic	Lost Tier I Semifinal (Ravens)
2012	5	1	0	1st Tier I South Atlantic	Won Tier I Semifinal (Xplosion); Lost Tier I Conference Championship (Blitz)
2013	7	1	0	1st Southwest	Won Western Conference Semifinal (Blaze); Won Western Conference Championship (Phantomz); Lost IWFL Championship (Phoenix)
2014	7	2	0	1st Southwest	Won Western Conference Semifinal (Phantomz); Won Western Conference Championship (Blaze); Lost IWFL Championship (Passion)
2015	6	1	0	1st Southwest	Lost Western Conference Semifinal (Blaze)
2016	4	4	0	5th Central	--
2017	6	3	0	2nd Central	Won Eastern Conference Semifinal (Queens); Lost Eastern Conference Championship (Yellow Jackets)
2018	4	0	0	2nd Central	Won IWFL Championship (Storm)
Houston Energy (WFA)
2019	6	2	0	3rd WFA II American Midwest	Lost First Round (Blaze)
2020	Season cancelled due to COVID-19 pandemic				
2021	6	2	0	1st WFA II American Midwest	Won First Round (Trojans); Lost WFA II Conference Championship (Storm)
2022	5	3	0	2nd WFA II American	Won First Round (Valkyries); Lost WFA II Conference Championship (Blaze)
2023	5	2	0	3rd WFA PRO American	Lost First Round (Vixen)
2024	4	2	0	5th WFA PRO American	--
2025	3	3	0	6th WFA PRO American	--
2026	3	3	0	3rd WFA PRO American	--
Totals	139	57	0	(including playoffs)	

== Season schedules ==
=== 2003 ===
Date	Opponent	Home/Away	Result
August 9	Dallas Diamonds	Away	Lost 12-14
August 16	Dallas Diamonds	Away	Won 39-14
August 23	So Cal Scorpions	Away	Won 41-0
September 6	San Diego Sunfire	Home	Won 62-22
September 13	Florida Stingrays	Home	Won 57-20
September 27	Dallas Diamonds	Home	Won 38-27
October 4	Missouri Avengers+	Away	Won 2-0
October 12	So Cal Scorpions	Home	Won 74-14
October 18	Dallas Diamonds	Away	Lost 7-10

=== 2004 ===
Date	Opponent	Home/Away	Result
July 31	Missouri Avengers+	Away	Won 1-0
August 15	Dallas Diamonds	Away	Lost 26-28
August 21	Indiana Speed	Away	Won 64-6
August 28	Dallas Diamonds	Home	Lost 13-33
September 11	Missouri Avengers	Home	Won 38-8
September 18	New York Dazzles	Away	Won 68-0
September 25	Delaware Griffins	Home	Won 50-6
October 9	Long Beach Aftershock	Away	Lost 9-18
October 16	Long Beach Aftershock	Home	Won 28-8
October 23	Northern Ice	Home	Won 21-14
October 30	Long Beach Aftershock*	Away	Won 22-8
November 6	Dallas Diamonds**	Away	Lost 14-25

=== 2005 ===
Date	Opponent	Home/Away	Result
July 30	Minnesota Vixen	Away	Won 40-0
August 13	So Cal Scorpions	Away	Lost 13-28
August 20	Dallas Diamonds	Away	Lost 18-21
August 27	Dallas Diamonds	Home	Lost 31-49
September 3	So Cal Scorpions	Home	Won 14-13
September 10	New Mexico Burn	Home	Won 58-6
October 8	New Mexico Burn	Away	Won 76-6
October 15	Dallas Diamonds*	Home	Lost 27-38

=== 2006 ===
Date	Opponent	Home/Away	Result
August 5	So Cal Scorpions	Away	Won 28-6
August 19	Dallas Diamonds	Away	Lost 21-31
August 26	Las Vegas Showgirlz	Home	Won 53-6
September 2	Minnesota Vixen	Away	Won 41-0
September 9	Dallas Diamonds	Home	Won 24-10
September 16	So Cal Scorpions	Home	Won 45-17
September 23	Minnesota Vixen	Home	Won 66-0
October 21	Wisconsin Wolves*	Home	Won 68-0
November 4	Dallas Diamonds**	Roswell, GA	Lost 27-34

=== 2007 ===
Date	Opponent	Home/Away	Result
August 18	Dallas Diamonds	Away	Lost 6-14
August 25	New Mexico Burn	Away	Won 77-0
September 8	New Mexico Burn	Home	Won 63-0
September 15	Connecticut Cyclones+	Away	Won 2-0
September 29	Wisconsin Wolves	Home	Won 27-6
October 6	Connecticut Cyclones+	Home	Won 2-0
October 13	Dallas Diamonds	Home	Won 33-12
October 20	Wisconsin Wolves	Away	Won 33-0
November 17	Wisconsin Wolves*	Home	Won 35-8
December 1	So Cal Scorpions**	San Diego, CA	Lost 7-14

=== 2009 ===
Date	Opponent	Home/Away	Result
April 11	Dallas Diamonds	Away	Lost 0-69
April 18	Atlanta Xplosion	Home	Lost 7-38
April 25	Orlando Mayhem	Away	Lost 7-28
May 2	Miami Fury	Home	Lost 0-21
May 9	Shreveport Aftershock	Away	Won 40-6
May 23	Shreveport Aftershock	Home	Won 49-0
June 6	Dallas Diamonds	Home	Lost 20-61
June 13	Dallas Diamonds	Away	Lost 7-76

=== 2010 ===
Date	Opponent	Home/Away	Result
April 3	Dallas Diamonds	Away	Lost 12-34
April 10	Louisiana Fuel	Home	Won 60-0
May 1	Atlanta Xplosion	Away	Lost 20-21
May 8	Miami Fury+	Home	Won 1-0
May 15	Louisiana Fuel	Away	Won 30-0
June 5	Dallas Diamonds	Home	Lost 36-44

=== 2011 ===
Date	Opponent	Home/Away	Result
April 2	North Texas Knockouts	Home	Won 50-14
April 9	Atlanta Xplosion	Home	Lost 15-35
April 23	North Texas Knockouts	Away	Won 40-14
April 30	Monterrey Black Mambas	Away	Won 44-6
May 7	North Texas Knockouts	Home	Won 34-12
May 14	Atlanta Xplosion	Away	Lost 6-39
June 4	Monterrey Black Mambas	Home	Won 38-0
June 25	Atlanta Xplosion*	Away	Lost 13-14

=== 2012 ===
Date	Opponent	Result
April 21	Arlington Impact	Won 35-0
May 5	Arkansas Banshees	Won 52-14
May 26	Arlington Impact	Won 38-22
June 16	Arkansas Banshees	Won 56-30
June 30	Atlanta Xplosion*	Won 21-20
July 14	Montreal Blitz*	Lost 16-28

=== 2013 ===
Date	Opponent	Location	Result
May 4	Arlington Impact		Won 73-8
May 11	San Antonio Regulators		Won 56-0
May 18	Arlington Impact		Won 55-8
June 8	San Antonio Regulators		Won 35-0
June 22	Arlington Impact		Won 52-8
July 13	Madison Blaze*		Won 30-0
July 20	Arizona Outkast		Won 56-0
August 3	Carolina Phoenix	Round Rock, TX	Lost 0-14

=== 2014 ===
Date	Opponent	Home/Away	Result
April 19	Arlington Impact	Away	Won 41-14
May 3	Arlington Impact	Home	Won 24-14
May 10	Arizona Outkast	Away	Won 62-13
May 17	San Antonio Regulators+	Home	Won 2-0
June 7	Arlington Impact	Away	Lost 7-26
June 14	San Antonio Regulators+	Away	Won 2-0
June 28	Arizona Outkast*	Home	Won 90-26
July 12	Madison Blaze*	Away	Won 53-0
July 26	Pittsburgh Passion**	Rock Hill, SC	Lost 7-41

=== 2015 ===
Date	Opponent	Home/Away	Result
April 11	Austin Yellow Jackets	Home	Won 45-0
April 25	San Antonio Regulators	Home	Won 14-0
May 2	New Orleans Krewe	Away	Won 54-0
May 15	Austin Yellow Jackets	Away	Won 14-12
June 5	San Antonio Regulators	Away	Won 53-14
June 13	New Orleans Krewe+	Home	Won 2-0
June 27	Madison Blaze*	Home	Lost 7-41

=== 2016 ===
Date	Opponent	Home/Away	Result
April 2	San Antonio Regulators	Home	Won 45-0
April 9	Woodlands Wildcats	Away	Lost 10-40
April 23	Tulsa Threat	Away	Won 32-12
April 30	Austin Yellow Jackets	Home	Lost 7-32
May 5	San Antonio Regulators	Away	Won 22-16
May 21	Woodlands Wildcats	Home	Lost 30-48
May 28	Tulsa Threat	Home	Won 44-18
June 4	Austin Yellow Jackets	Away	Lost 0-28

=== 2017 ===
Date	Opponent	Home/Away	Result
April 1	Tulsa Threat	Away	Won 26-0
April 15	Austin Yellow Jackets	Home	Lost 6-24
April 22	San Antonio Regulators	Away	Won 32-18
April 29	South Texas Lady Crushers+	Home	Won 1-0
May 6	Tulsa Threat	Home	Won 37-7
May 20	San Antonio Regulators	Home	Won 34-0
June 3	Austin Outlaws	Away	Lost 6-36
July 1	Carolina Queens+	Away	Won 1-0
July 8	Austin Outlaws	Away	Lost 8-16

=== 2018 ===
Date	Opponent	Home/Away	Result
April 14	Tulsa Threat	Away	Won 40-7
May 19	San Antonio Regulators	Away	Won 48-6
May 26	Tulsa Threat	Home	Won 42-0
July 21	Nevada Storm**	Home	Won 34-0

=== 2019 ===
Date	Opponent	Home/Away	Result
April 6	Austin Outlaws	Away	Won 50-0
April 13	Houston Power	Home	Won 56-0
April 20	Arlington Impact	Home	Won 34-14
May 4	Dallas Elite	Away	Won 44-0
May 25	Comal County Camo+	Away	Won 2-0
June 1	Arlington Impact	Away	Lost 24-26
June 8	Dallas Elite	Home	Won 66-6
June 15	Mile High Blaze	Away	Lost 22-30

=== 2021 ===
Date	Opponent	Home/Away	Result
May 1	Gulf Coast Monarchy	Away	Won 32-12
May 8	Arlington Impact	Home	Lost 7-8
May 15	Austin Outlaws	Away	Won 52-0
May 22	Dallas Elite Mustangs	Away	Won 52-6
June 5	Houston Power	Home	Won 54-14
June 12	Gulf Coast Monarchy	Home	Won 50-0
June 26	Sin City Trojans+	Home	Won 2-0
July 10	Nevada Storm*	Away	Lost 6-14

=== 2022 ===
Date	Opponent	Home/Away	Result
April 9	Dallas Elite Mustangs	Away	Won 42-8
April 16	Arlington Impact	Home	Lost 30-34
April 23	Austin Outlaws	Away	Won 38-6
April 30	Mile High Blaze	Home	Lost 14-18
May 14	Zydeco Spice	Away	Won 54-8
May 21	Dallas Elite	Home	Won 42-13
June 11	Nebraska Pride	Home	Won 30-7
June 25	Mile High Blaze*	Away	Lost 6-12

=== 2023 ===
Date	Opponent	Home/Away	Result
April 22	Austin Outlaws	Away	Won 48-0
May 6	Dallas Elite Mustangs	Home	Won 34-0
May 13	Minnesota Vixen	Away	Lost 14-28
May 20	Zydeco Spice	Away	Won 48-6
June 3	Arlington Impact	Home	Won 60-0
June 10	Austin Outlaws	Home	Won 58-0
June 24	Minnesota Vixen*	Away	Lost 34-38

=== 2024 ===
Date	Opponent	Home/Away	Result
April 27	Oklahoma City Lady Force	Home	Lost 16-14
May 4	Austin Outlaws	Home	Won 34-6
May 11	Zydeco Spice	Away	Won 55-6
May 18	Dallas Elite Mustangs	Home	Won 41-22
June 1	Cali War	Away	Lost 32-22
June 15	Austin Outlaws	Away	Won 42-14

=== 2025 ===
Date	Opponent	Home/Away	Result
May 3	Dallas Elite Mustangs	Home	Won 41-0
May 10	Austin Outlaws	Away	Won 57-0
May 17	Nebraska Pride	Home	Lost 13-12
May 31	Cali War	Away	Lost 52-6
June 7	Mile High Blaze	Home	Lost 12-6
June 14	Dallas Elite Mustangs	Away	Won 14-12

+Forfeit

*Playoff game

**National Championship game

Seasons recalled from the Houston Energy Massey Ratings

== All-American players ==
Year	Team	Player	Position
2022	1st	Aundrea Radford	LB
2022	1st	Christina Jaques	QB
2022	1st	Kara Haines	RB
2022	2nd	Alaja Butler	DE
2022	2nd	Alice Caine	OL
2022	2nd	Brianna Hollins	TE
2022	2nd	Jay Jones	DT
2022	2nd	Kalli Douma	OL
2022	3rd	Kelsey West	FS
2022	3rd	Lajayshia Dotson	KR
2023	1st	Annie Vanhorn	FS
2023	1st	As Jones	DT
2023	1st	Christina Jaques	QB
2023	1st	Kara Haines	FB
2023	1st	Kristyn Aoake	LB
2023	1st	Shannell Cotton	CB
2024	1st	Brook Wilson	TB
2024	1st	Dani Spearman	FS
2024	1st	Datiana Sikahema	DT
2024	1st	Jessica Rivas	OL
2024	1st	Kelsey West	SS
2024	1st	Suzie Garrett	FB
2024	2nd	Amirra Parker	WR
2024	2nd	Ariele Adams	DB
2024	2nd	Ashley Robinson	WR
2024	2nd	Carol Maresh	QB
