= Minnesota Vixen =

American women's football team

- Founded: 1999
- League: WPFL (1999–2007); NWFA (2008); IWFL (2009–2016); WFA (2017–present)
- Team history: Minnesota Vixen
- Based in: Minneapolis-Saint Paul
- Stadium: Klas Field, Hamline University
- Colors: Black & Red
- Owner: Laura Brown
- Head coach: Connor Jo Lewis
- Championships: (1) 2026 WFA Pro
- Conference titles: (5) IWFL Eastern Conference (2016); WFA American Conference (2018); WFA American Conference (2021); WFA American Conference (2022); WFA American Conference (2026)
- Mascot: Blitz the Vixen

The Minnesota Vixen is a professional women's football team based in the Twin Cities. The team has been known as the Minnesota Vixens and Minneapolis Vixens prior to being known as the Vixen (singular).

Established in 1999, the Vixen are the longest continuously operating women's American football team in the nation. The team plays full contact, tackle football following NCAA rules.

In 2014, the Vixen's record was 6–2 with an invite to the inaugural Legacy Bowl in South Carolina. In 2016, the team went undefeated in the regular season winning the IWFL Midwest Division. They then faced the New York Shark for the IWFL Eastern Conference Championship, winning in double overtime and appeared in the IWFL World Championship Game in South Carolina against the Utah Falconz. In 2017, the Vixen changed leagues and joined the Women's Football Alliance (WFA) where they continue to compete on a national level. Since joining the WFA the Vixen have appeared in 3 national championship games, 2018, 2021 and 2022.

Since 2015, the Vixen have partnered with Town Square Television to have all Minnesota Vixen home games televised live along with live web streaming. In 2019, the Vixen were the first women's team to offer live broadcast of all regular season games including both home and away via Town Square Television.

Laura Brown is the current owner of the Vixen and has run team operations with James Brown since 2014. Laura Brown was named to the WFA's Owners Board in October 2018.

== History ==
=== 1999 Barnstorming Tour ===
In 1999, businessmen Carter Turner and Terry Sullivan decided to explore the feasibility of a professional women's football league by gathering together top female athletes from across the United States and dividing them into two teams for a nationwide series of exhibition games. More than 100 women attended tryouts. The teams were named the Minnesota Vixens and the Lake Michigan Minx, and the "No Limits" Barnstorming Tour featured six games in such locations as Miami, Chicago, and New York. The final exhibition game was played at the Hubert H. Humphrey Metrodome in Minneapolis, which the Vixens lost by a score of 30–27.

=== 2000: WPFL kicks off ===
The success of the tour led Turner and Sullivan to form the Women's Professional Football League (WPFL); although the Minx would not join the Vixen in the WPFL's first full season, the Austin Rage, Colorado Valkyries, Daytona Beach Barracudas, Houston Energy, Miami Fury, New England Storm, New York Galaxy, New York Sharks, Oklahoma City Wildcats, and Tampa Tempest would join the Vixen to form the WPFL's inaugural roster of teams. The Vixen would finish the regular season unbeaten at 5–0, clinch the Central Division title, and ensure home-field advantage throughout the American Conference playoffs. However, that playoff run would only last one game, as the Vixen lost the American Conference Championship Game to the eventual WPFL Champion Houston Energy by a score of 35–14.

=== 2001 ===
In 2001, the Minnesota Vixen entered their third season of competition under new ownership. The team faced early challenges on the road, falling to both the Arizona Caliente and the Indianapolis Vipers. They rebounded at home, defeating the Vipers in a spirited rematch.

=== 2002 ===
The Minnesota Vixen opened their 2002 season with a postponed matchup against the Indiana Speed. In their next game, they shut out the Missouri Prowlers 50–0 at home. On the road, the Vixen fell to the Wisconsin Riveters 14–33 and lost a hard-fought battle to the Indiana Speed, 6–11. They responded with another dominant performance against the Prowlers, earning a 53–0 shutout win on the road. The regular season was set to conclude at home against the Riveters.

=== 2003 ===
In 2003, the team finished the season with a 3–7 record. They opened with back-to-back losses to the Indiana Speed, followed by a narrow 2–0 road win over the Missouri Prowlers. However, the Vixen struggled against the powerhouse Wisconsin Northern Ice, dropping three high-scoring contests across the season.

Despite the setbacks, the Vixen delivered standout performances, including a dominant 61–0 home victory over the Toledo Reign and a 61–12 win in a rematch against the Missouri Prowlers. The team also put up a strong effort in a 19–28 loss to the Syracuse Sting.

=== 2004 ===
In 2004, the Minnesota Vixen bounced back from previous struggles to post a 6–4 record and earn a WPFL playoff berth.

The season began with a nail-biting 12–14 road loss to the Indiana Speed, but the Vixen responded in thrilling fashion, edging out the Speed 26–24 in their home opener. After tough losses to the Wisconsin Northern Ice and the Los Angeles Amazons, the Vixen regained momentum with a dominant 27–0 win over the Toledo Reign.

Throughout the second half of the season, the Vixen found their stride, winning four of their last five regular-season games, including a decisive 35–20 victory over the Missouri Avengers and a 30–20 win against the Delaware Griffins. They also picked up a forfeit win on the road against Missouri and closed out the regular season with a 14–8 victory over Toledo.

Earning a spot in the WPFL National Conference Wildcard Game, the Vixen once again faced the Delaware Griffins. In a tough, low-scoring battle, Minnesota came up just short, falling 6–8 to end their postseason run.

=== 2005 ===
In 2005, the Vixen finished the regular season 5–4 and earned a spot in the postseason for the second year in a row.

After a rough season opener against powerhouse Houston Energy (0–40), the Vixen rebounded with three straight wins—including back-to-back road victories over Toledo Reign (27–22) and Indiana Speed (7–6), followed by a close 18–13 home win in a rematch with Indiana. A tough matchup against the Dallas Diamonds resulted in a 6–62 loss, but the Vixen regrouped with solid wins over Toledo (30–8) and Empire State Roar (39–14).

Despite late-season losses to Indiana and Toledo, the Vixen made the playoffs. In the WPFL National Conference Wildcard Game, they earned a 19–14 win over Indiana, advancing to the National Conference Championship. There, the Vixen faced the New York Dazzles in a defensive battle, narrowly falling 12–14 in one of the closest games of the season.

=== 2006 ===
Opening the season on a high note, the Vixen secured a strong 32–8 home victory over the Toledo Reign. However, the Vixen then dropped six straight games, including close battles against the Indiana Speed (0–14 away and 7–14 at home) and tough losses to the Wisconsin Wolves and Houston Energy—two of the league’s top teams. The rematch against Houston on the road ended in a lopsided 0–66 defeat.

=== 2007 ===
The 2007 season marked the end of an era for the Minnesota Vixen as they played their final year in the WPFL. The team finished with a 2–5 record, placing third in the National Conference, North Division.

After a slow start that included close losses to Indiana and Wisconsin, and tough defeats against the powerhouse Los Angeles Amazons, the Vixen found their stride late in the year. They notched a 7–0 home win over the Indiana Speed in a gritty defensive battle, followed by an 18–6 road victory over the Toledo Reign to close the season.

Shortly after the season concluded, the Vixen made the strategic decision to leave the WPFL and join the National Women's Football Association (NWFA).

=== 2008 ===
In 2008, the Minnesota Vixen entered a new chapter as members of the NWFA—their first and only season in the league. The team delivered a dominant regular-season performance and finishing with a 6–2 record, securing second place in the Northern Conference, North Division and qualifying for the playoffs.

The Vixen opened their season with a commanding three-game win streak, shutting out the Indianapolis Chaos (40–0), Tree Town Spitfire (40–0), and Kansas City Storm (58–0). Their only two regular-season losses came at the hands of the division powerhouse, West Michigan Mayhem—once on the road (7–51) and again at home in a much closer match-up (13–21). Additional wins included another blowout over the Chaos (62–6), a second shutout against Tree Town (41–0), and a forfeit victory over the Kansas City Storm.

Earning a spot in the NWFA playoffs, the Vixen faced a familiar opponent—the West Michigan Mayhem, who had handed them their only two regular-season losses. Unfortunately, the playoff result mirrored their previous meetings, with the Vixen falling 7–31 to the eventual NWFA runners-up.

Following the season, the Vixen transitioned once again—this time joining the Independent Women’s Football League (IWFL).

=== 2013 ===
Competing in the IWFL Tier II, the Vixen posted a 6–3 regular-season record in 2013 and returned to the playoffs.

The season began with a forfeit win over the Rockford Riveters, followed by a narrow 20–26 road loss to the Wisconsin Warriors. The Vixen stumbled again against the Madison Blaze (0–26) but rebounded with a gritty 6–0 win on the road against the Iowa Crush. Another forfeit win against Rockford helped steady their record, and momentum grew as the Vixen defeated the Warriors 51–7 in a dominant home performance.

They split their final two regular-season games—falling to Madison on the road (6–40) but finishing strong with a 26–6 victory over Iowa. Earning a postseason spot, the Vixen advanced past the Warriors by forfeit in the first round of the IWFL Tier II playoffs but fell just short in a tight 14–18 loss to the Arlington Impact.

2013 also marked the arrival of a key figure in Vixen history: Laura Brown joined the team as a rookie. Her passion for the game and leadership qualities would eventually lead her to become the team’s owner, playing a central role in shaping the Vixen’s future both on and off the field.

=== 2014 ===
In 2014, the current owner Laura Brown acquired the Vixen and runs operations with co-owner James Brown. They named Brandon Pelinka head coach along with Damion Topping as defensive coordinator and Adam Griffith as special teams coordinator. The Vixen also brought in two new coaches: running backs coach Jeff Gehring and defensive backs coach Darrion Branscomb. That season, the Vixen went 6–2 and appeared in the Legacy Bowl, facing the Carolina Queens.

=== 2015 ===
In 2015, the Vixen moved to Simley Athletic Field in Inver Grove Heights. In addition, Town Square Television started televising all Vixen home games and offering live web-stream. The team had another successful year, finishing 6–2, just missing the post-season.

=== 2016 ===
The Vixen added Coach Danny Ekstrand as wide receivers coach in 2016. The Vixen team then went undefeated (8–0) with the Vixen defense only allowing one touchdown the entire regular season. They earned their first IWFL Midwest Division Title. The Vixen then hosted the New York Sharks at home stadium Simley Athletic Field, setting a new attendance record of over 1,100 fans. The Vixen won the game in double overtime with a 101-yard interception returned for a touchdown by rookie Crystal Ninas. The winning play was highlighted on ESPN's Sports Center's Top Tens Plays of the Week and earned the Vixen's firsts ever conference title. The Vixen then went on to face the Utah Falconz in the IWFL World Championship Game in South Carolina losing 6–49.

=== 2017 ===
In 2017, the Minnesota Vixen departed the IWFL and joined the Women's Football Alliance (WFA). Joining the coaching staff was Stefan Dahl Holm as the Line Coach. The team finished the regular season 6–2. In the first round of the playoffs, the Vixen beat the Kansas City Titans, only to fall to the Dallas Elite in round 2.

=== 2018 ===
The 2018 season marked the Minnesota Vixen’s 20th year of competition. Owner Laura Brown stepped in as Head Coach, becoming the first female head coach in Vixen history. Under new leadership, the team posted a 7–1 regular season record and advanced to the WFA Division II National Championship, finishing the year with a 9–2 overall record.

The Vixen opened the season with dominant wins over the Madison Blaze (46–0), Wisconsin Dragons (40–6), and Kansas City Titans (33–25). They continued their hot streak with victories against the Detroit Dark Angels, Columbus Vanguards, and a forfeit win from Madison. Their only regular season loss came in a rematch against Kansas City, falling 19–47 on the road.

After earning a first-round playoff bye, the Vixen defeated the Wisconsin Dragons 35–7 in the second round, then topped the Mile High Blaze 29–6 to become the 2018 WFA American Conference Champions. That victory earned them a trip to the Division II National Championship, where they battled the New York Sharks in a close game, ultimately falling 21–27.

Off the field, head coach Laura Brown and her staff were named WFA All-American Coaches for the 2018 American Conference, a testament to the team’s strategic excellence and player development. She was also voted onto the WFA Owners' Board in October 2019.

=== 2019 ===
In 2019, Ryan McCauley was brought in as head coach along with several other coaching staff including R.J. Speidel as the Defensive Coordinator, Matt O'Keefe as Running Backs Coach, and Shaun Mattson with Jim Speidel as Quarterbacks Coaches. Furthermore, two long term Vixen players, Jessica Giesemann and Michele Braun retired from their playing careers to step into coaching roles with linebackers and offensive line respectively. Coaches J. Alfred Potter, Bruce Brevitz and Jason Cornelison have continued in their respective positions as well to complete the 2019 coaching staff. Returning to the Vixen coaching staff to help with wide receivers is former Vixen coach Emilie Sundberg. The team moved stadiums to the suburb of Edina and also joined forces with RICCI Media to be the first Women's football team to expand their broadcasts to include all road games as well as home games.

=== 2020 ===
In early 2020, the Minnesota Vixen welcomed former standout player Connor Jo Lewis to the coaching staff as the team’s wide receivers coach. Lewis had an impressive playing career with the Vixen, earning WFA All-American honors in 2018 and 2019, a Team MVP Honorable Mention in 2018, and serving as a team captain. Known for her versatility, she played both linebacker and quarterback.

The Vixen were forced to take a year off due to the COVID-19 pandemic. While the 2020 season was canceled, players continued to train individually and stay connected virtually.

=== 2021 ===
In 2021, the WFA adjusted its schedule in response to ongoing pandemic-related restrictions, shortening the season by 25% and pushing the start to May. The Minnesota Vixen came out strong under second-year Head Coach Ryan McCauley, dominating the regular season with an 8-0 run and earning the top spot in the Division I Midwest Region.

The Vixen opened the season with back-to-back blowout wins over the Iowa Phoenix (56–0 and 62–6) and continued their dominance with shutouts against the Sioux Falls Snow Leopards and a 49–6 road victory over the Arlington Impact. They capped off the regular season with a decisive 51–14 win against the Dallas Elite Mustangs.

In the postseason, the Vixen defeated the Arlington Impact 24–14 in the first round, then claimed the Division I American Conference Championship with a hard-fought 33–22 win over Cali War. Their run led them to their first-ever appearance in the Division I National Championship, where they ultimately fell to the Boston Renegades in a competitive 42–26 matchup.

Off the field, the Vixen shifted home games to Concordia University in St. Paul.

Star running back Grace Cooper was named the WFA American Conference Offensive Player of the Year.

=== 2022 ===
In 2022, the Minnesota Vixen finished with a 6–3 regular season record and claimed the top spot in the WFA Pro Midwest Region. The team powered through the playoffs with a dominant 27–10 win over the Nevada Storm in the first round, followed by a thrilling 36–30 victory against Cali War to secure the WFA Pro American Conference Championship. They earned a return trip to the WFA Pro National Championship, where they faced the powerhouse Boston Renegades. The Vixen fell short, closing out the season as national runners-up.

This season also marked a milestone for the program, as the Vixen welcomed their first international player—Jonna Tuovinen from Finland.

Wide receivers coach Connor Jo Lewis was selected as a Bill Walsh NFL Diversity Coaching Fellowship recipient, working with the tight ends, fullbacks, and analytics team for the Baltimore Ravens during their training camp.

Head Coach Ryan McCauley was named the WFA Coach of the Year.

=== 2023 ===
In 2023, the Minnesota Vixen battled through a tough schedule to finish the regular season with a 4–2 record.

The season opened with a road match-up against the St. Louis Slam, resulting in a 0–20 loss. The Vixen quickly bounced back in Week 2 with a commanding 55–12 win over the Nebraska Pride at home. After a bye week, they delivered a statement victory against perennial powerhouse Houston Energy, winning 28–14 in front of an energized Twin Cities crowd.

In their second meeting with St. Louis, the Vixen again fell short in a hard-fought game, dropping to 2–2. However, they closed out the season strong with back-to-back road wins—first, a 21–6 win over Nebraska Pride, followed by a thrilling 35–32 victory against Cali War in California.

The 2023 season also welcomed international talent, as linebacker Hannah Eckhardt from Germany joined the team. Leading that defense was Sam Barber (#13), who anchored the secondary with dominant play and was honored as the WFA Defensive Player of the Year.

Off the field, Laura Brown added to her coaching résumé by serving as the Defensive Line Coach for Team World at the WFA International Costa Rica Coffee Bowl.

=== 2024 ===
In 2024, the Minnesota Vixen continued to build on their legacy with a season marked by explosive offense, international talent, and a new era of leadership. Connor Jo Lewis took the reins as head coach, becoming the second female head coach in Vixen history and bringing a fresh perspective to the sidelines. Laura Brown, who led the team to previous championships, remained a key presence as General Manager and contributed internationally as the Defensive Coordinator and Co-Head Coach of Team World for the WFA International European bout in the fall of 2024.

The Vixen finished the regular season with a 4–2 record, including dominant wins over Dallas (64–30), Iowa (55–0), D.C. (42–34), and Nebraska (34–0). They opened the postseason with a convincing 35–13 victory over the Mile High Blaze, advancing to the WFA Pro American Conference Championship. There, they faced longtime rival St. Louis Slam but came up short in a hard-fought 3–20 battle.

Off the field, the Vixen strengthened their international presence with the return of linebacker Hannah Eckhardt from Germany and the addition of standout running back #21 Johanna Vermöhlen, also from Germany, whose speed and power added depth to the backfield.

On offense, wide receiver #81 Jackie Radford was honored as the WFA MVP Offensive Player of the Year.

== Season by season ==
Season records
| Season | W | L | T | Finish | Playoff results |
|---|---|---|---|---|---|
Minnesota Vixen (WPFL)
| 1999 | 0 | 6 | 0 | | No Limits Barnstorming Tour |
| 2000 | 5 | 1 | 0 | 1st American Central | Lost American Conference Championship (Houston) |
| 2001 | 1 | 2 | 0 | Exhibition Team | – |
| 2002 | 2 | 3 | 0 | 4th National | – |
| 2003 | 3 | 7 | 0 | 4th American North | – |
| 2004 | 6 | 5 | 0 | 2nd National North | Lost National Conference Semifinal (Delaware) |
| 2005 | 6 | 5 | 0 | 2nd National North | Won National Conference Qualifier (Indiana); Lost National Conference Championship (New York) |
| 2006 | 1 | 6 | 0 | 3rd National East | – |
| 2007 | 3 | 5 | 0 | 3rd North Central | – |
Minnesota Vixen (NWFA)
| 2008 | 6 | 3 | 0 | 2nd North North | Lost Northern Conference Quarterfinal (West Michigan) |
Minnesota Vixen (IWFL)
| 2009 | 2 | 6 | 0 | 3rd Tier I West Midwest | – |
| 2010 | 0 | 8 | 0 | 8th Tier II West Midwest | – |
| 2011 | 0 | 8 | 0 | 4th West-Mid West Division | – |
| 2012 | 2 | 6 | 0 | 4th Midwest Division | – |
| 2013 | 6 | 4 | 0 | 3rd Midwest Division | Lost Tier II Western Conference Championship (Arlington Impact) |
| 2014 | 6 | 3 | 0 | 2nd Midwest Division | Lost 2014 Legacy Bowl (Carolina Queens) |
| 2015 | 6 | 2 | 0 | 2nd Midwest Division | – |
| 2016 | 9 | 1 | 0 | 1st Midwest Division; Eastern Conference Champions | Won Tier I Semifinals (New York Sharks); Lost Tier I Championship (Utah Falconz) |
Minnesota Vixen (WFA)
| 2017 | 7 | 3 | 0 | 2nd Great Plains (Division I) | Won First Round Playoff Game (Kansas City Titans); Lost Second round Playoff game (Dallas Elite) |
| 2018 | 9 | 2 | 0 | 1st Midwest Region (Division II); American Conference Champions | 1st Round Playoff Bye; WonSecond Round Playoff Game (Wisconsin Dragons); Won Div II Semifinals(Mile High Blaze); Lost Division II Championship (New York Sharks) |
| 2019 | 7 | 2 | 0 | 2nd Midwest Region (Division II) | Lost Conference 1/4 final round (St Louis) |
| 2020 | Season cancelled (COVID-19 pandemic) | | | | |
| 2021 | 8 | 1 | 0 | 1st Midwest Region (Division I); American Conference Champions | Won First Round Playoff Game (Arlington Impact); Won Div I American Conference Championship (Cali-War); Lost Division I Championship (Boston Renegades) |
| 2022 | 6 | 3 | 0 | 1st Midwest Region (WFA Pro); American Conference Champions | Won First Round Playoff Game (Nevada Storm); WonPro Div American Conference Championship (Cali-War); Lost Pro Division Championship (Boston Renegades) |
| 2023 | 5 | 3 | 0 | 2nd Midwest Region (WFA Pro) | Won First Round Playoff Game (Houston); Lost American Conference Championship (St. Louis) |
| 2024 | 5 | 3 | 0 | 2nd Midwest Region (WFA Pro) | Won First Round Playoff Game (Mile High); Lost American Conference Championship (St. Louis) |
| 2025 | 4 | 4 | 0 | 2nd Midwest Region (WFA Pro) | Won First Round Playoff Game (Cali); Lost American Conference Championship (St. Louis) |
| Totals | 115 | 102 | 0 | (including playoffs) | |

* = Current Standing

== Season schedules ==
=== 1999 ===
| Date | Opponent | Home/Away | Win/Loss | Score |
|---|---|---|---|---|
| October 9 | Lake Michigan Minx | Home | Loss | 6–33 |
| October 16 | Lake Michigan Minx | Away (Chicago, IL) | Loss | 19–30 |
| October 20 | Lake Michigan Minx | Home | Loss | 20–32 |
| November 13 | Lake Michigan Minx | Away (Green Bay WI) | Loss | 37–41 |
| December 11 | New York Sharks | Away | Loss | 6–12 |
| December 18 Supra Bowl I | Lake Michigan Minx | Home (HHH Metrodome) | Loss | 20–23 |

=== 2000 ===
| Date | Opponent | Home/Away | Win/Loss | |
|---|---|---|---|---|
| October 14 | Colorado Valkyries | Home | Won | 14–12 |
| October 21 | Tampa Bay Tempest | Home | Won | 63–0 |
| October 28 | Austin Rage | Home | Won | 35–19 |
| November 4 | Houston Energy | Home | Won | 30–8 |
| November 11 | Oklahoma City Wildcats | Away | Won | 28–0 |
| December 23 American Conference Championship | Houston Energy | | Lost | 14–35 |

2001

| Date | Opponent | Home/Away | Win/Loss |
|---|---|---|---|
| | Arizona Caliente | Away | Loss |
| | Indianapolis Vipers | Away | Loss |
| | Indianapolis Vipers | Home | Win |

2002 WPFL

| Date | Opponent | Home/Away | Win/Loss | Score |
|---|---|---|---|---|
| August 3 | Indiana Speed | Home | Postponed | |
| August 10 | Missouri Prowlers | Home | Win | 50-0 |
| August 18 | Wisconsin Riveters | Away | Loss | 14-33 |
| August 24 | Indiana Speed | Away | Loss | 6–11 |
| August 31 | Missouri Prowlers | Away | Win | 53-0 |
| September 7 | Wisconsin Riveters | Home | | |

=== 2003 ===
| Date | Opponent | Home/Away | Win/Loss | Score |
|---|---|---|---|---|
| August 2 | Indiana Speed | Home | Loss | 0–26 |
| August 9 | Indiana Speed | Away | Loss | 13–46 |
| August 16 | Missouri Prowlers | Away | Win | 2–0 |
| August 24 | Wisconsin Northern Ice | Home | Loss | 6–61 |
| September 6 | Wisconsin Northern Ice | Away | Loss | 7–63 |
| September 20 | Toledo Reign | Home | Win | 61–0 |
| September 27 | Florida Stingrays | Away | Loss | 15–33 |
| October 6 | Syracuse Sting | Away | Loss | 19–28 |
| October 11 | Missouri Prowlers | Home | Win | 61–12 |
| October 18 | Wisconsin Northern Ice | Home | Loss | 13–61 |

=== 2004 ===
| Date | Opponent | Home/Away | Win/Loss | Score |
|---|---|---|---|---|
| July 31 | Indiana Speed | Away | Loss | 12–14 |
| August 7 | Indiana Speed | Home | Win | 26–24 |
| August 14 | Wisconsin Northern Ice | Away | loss | 0–27 |
| August 28 | Los Angeles Amazons | Away | Loss | 0–15 |
| September 4 | Toledo Reign | Home | Win | 27–0 |
| September 25 | Wisconsin Northern Ice | Home | Loss | 25–32 |
| October 2 | Missouri Avengers | Home | Win | 35–20 |
| October 9 | Delaware Griffins | Home | Win | 30–20 |
| October 16 | Missouri Avengers | Away | Win | Forfeit |
| October 23 | Toledo Reign | Away | Win | 14–8 |
| October 30 National Conference Wildcard Game | Delaware Griffins | | Loss | 6–8 |

=== 2005 ===
| Date | Opponent | Home/Away | Win/Loss | Score |
|---|---|---|---|---|
| July 30 | Houston Energy | Home | Loss | 0–40 |
| August 6 | Toledo Reign | Away | Win | 27–22 |
| August 13 | Indiana Speed | Away | Win | 7–6 |
| September 10 | Indiana Speed | Home | Win | 18–13 |
| September 17 | Dallas Diamonds | Away | Loss | 6–62 |
| September 24 | Toledo Reign | Home | Win | 30–8 |
| October 8 | Empire State Roar | Home | Win | 39–14 |
| October 15 | Indiana Speed | Away | Loss | 14–26 |
| October 22 | Toledo Reign | Home | Loss | 22–36 |
| October 28 National Conference Wildcard Game | Indiana Speed | Away | Won | 19–14 |
| November 5 National Conference Championship Game | New York Dazzles | Away | Loss | 12–14 |

=== 2006 ===
| Date | Opponent | Home/Away | Win/Loss | Score |
|---|---|---|---|---|
| July 22 | Toledo Reign | Home | Won | 32–8 |
| July 29 | Indiana Speed | Away | Loss | 0–14 |
| August 5 | Wisconsin Wolves | Away | Loss | 0–20 |
| August 12 | Indiana speed | Home | Loss | 7–14 |
| September 2 | Houston Energy | Home | Loss | 0–41 |
| September 16 | Wisconsin Wolves | Home | Loss | 6–32 |
| September 23 | Houston Energy | Away | Loss | 0–66 |

=== 2007 ===
| Date | Opponent | Home/Away | Win/Loss | Score |
|---|---|---|---|---|
| August | Indiana Speed | Away | Loss | 0–16 |
| September 1 | Wisconsin Wolves | Home | Loss | 10–13 |
| September 8 | Los Angeles Amazons | Away | Loss | 6–52 |
| September 15 | Toledo Reign | Home | Win | 13–6 |
| September 22 | Wisconsin Wolves | Away | Loss | 7–42 |
| September 29 | Los Angeles Amazons | Home | Loss | 0–35 |
| October 13 | Indianan Speed | Home | Win | 7–0 |
| October 20 | Toledo Reign | Away | Win | 18–6 |

=== 2008 ===
| Date | Opponent | Home/Away | Win/Loss | Score |
|---|---|---|---|---|
| April 19 | Bye | | | |
| April 26 | Indianapolis Chaos | Away | Win | 40–0 |
| May 3 | Tree Town Spitfire | Home | Win | 40–0 |
| May 10 | Kansas City Storm | Home | Win | 58–0 |
| May 17 | West Michigan Mayhem | Away | Loss | 7–51 |
| May 31 | Indianapolis Chaos | Home | Win | 62–6 |
| June 7 | Tree Town Spitfire | Away | Win | 41–0 |
| June 14 | Kansas City Storm | Away | Win | Forfeit |
| June 21 | West Michigan Mayhem | Home | Lost | 13–21 |
| June 28 | West Michigan Mayhem | Away | Lost | 7–31 |

=== 2009 ===
| Date | Opponent | Home/Away | Result | Score |
|---|---|---|---|---|
| April 11 | Kansas City Tribe | Away | Lost | 8–45 |
| April 25 | Chicago Force | Home | Lost | 0–55 |
| May 2 | Wisconsin Warriors | Home | Lost | 16–54 |
| May 16 | Iowa Crush | Home | Won | 38–20 |
| May 23 | Chicago Force | Away | Lost | 0–53 |
| May 30 | Wisconsin Warriors | Away | Lost | 8–38 |
| June 6 | Iowa Crush | Away | Won | 14–9 |
| June 13 | Kansas City Tribe | Home | Lost | 0–65 |
| July 18 IWFL International Challenge Series | Manitoba Fearless | Duluth, MN | | |

=== 2010 ===
| Date | Opponent | Home/Away | Result | Score |
|---|---|---|---|---|
| April 3 | Wisconsin Wolves | Away | Lost | 30–73 |
| April 10 | Iowa Crush | Home | Lost | 14–35 |
| April 24 | Dallas Diamonds | Away | Lost | 0–79 |
| April 27 | Iowa Crush | Away | Lost | 0–37 |
| May 8 | Chicago Force | Home | Lost | 0–56 |
| May 15 | Kansas City Tribe | Home | Lost | 0–80 |
| May 22 | Wisconsin Warriors | Away | Lost | 0–55 |
| June 5 | Wisconsin Wolves | Home | Los | 18–20 |

=== 2011 ===
| Date | Opponent | Home/Away | Result | Score |
|---|---|---|---|---|
| April 9 | Iowa Crush | Home | Lost | 6–20 |
| April 23 | Madison Cougars | Away | Lost | 0–16 |
| April 30 | Wisconsin Warriors | Home | Lost | 12–45 |
| May 7 | Iowa Crush | Away | Lost | 14–26 |
| May 21 | Wisconsin Warriors | Away | Lost | 6–60 |
| May 28 | Madison Cougars | Away | Lost | 6–7 |
| June 4 | Iowa Crush | Away | Lost | 12–38 |
| June 11 | Madison Cougars | Home | Lost | 14–26 |

=== 2012 ===
| Date | Opponent | Home/Away | Result | Score |
|---|---|---|---|---|
| April 14 | Rockford Riveters | Home | Won | 44–0 |
| April 28 | Madison Cougars | Home | Lost | 0–15 |
| May 5 | Rockford Riveters | Away | Won | 32–0 |
| May 12 | Madison Cougars | Away | Lost | 0–20 |
| May 19 | Wisconsin Warriors | Home | Lost | 6–40 |
| May 26 | Iowa Crush | Home | Lost | 30–36 |
| June 9 | Iowa Crush | Away | Lost | 12–29 |
| June 16 | Wisconsin Warriors | Away | Lost | 6–36 |

=== 2013 ===
| Date | Opponent | Home/Away | Result | Score |
|---|---|---|---|---|
| April 27 | Rockford Riveters | Home | Won | Forfeit |
| May 4 | Wisconsin Warriors | Away | Lost | 20–26 |
| May 18 | Madison Blaze | Home | Lost | 0–26 |
| May 25 | Iowa Crush | Away | Won | 6–0 |
| June 1 | Rockford Riveters | Away | Won | Forfeit |
| June 15 | Wisconsin Warriors | Home | Won | 51–7 |
| June 22 | Madison Blaze | Away | Lost | 6–40 |
| June 29 | Iowa Crush | Away | Won | 26–6 |
| IWFL Tier II Playoffs | | | | |
| July 13 | Wisconsin Warriors | Away | Won | Forfeit |
| July 20 | Arlington Impact | Away | Lost | 14–18 |

=== 2014 ===
| Date | Opponent | Home/Away | Result | Score |
|---|---|---|---|---|
| April 19 | Missouri Thundercats | Home | Won | Forfeit |
| April 26 | Wisconsin Warriors | Away | Won | 12–6 |
| May 3 | Madison Blaze | Away | Lost | 0–14 |
| May 10 | Iowa Crush | Home | Lost | 6–14 |
| May 24 | Wisconsin Warriors | Home | Won | 14–0 |
| May 31 | Missouri Thundercats | Away | Won | Forfeit |
| June 7 | Madison Blaze | Home | Won | 18–14 |
| June 14 | Iowa Crush | Away | Won | 12–6 |
| July 25 Legacy Bowl | Carolina Queens | Rock Hill, SC | Lost | 22–28 |

=== 2015 ===
| Date | Opponent | Home/Away | Result | Score |
|---|---|---|---|---|
| April 11 | Nebraska Stampede | Away | Won | 22–6 |
| April 18 | Wisconsin Warriors | Home | Won | 38–7 |
| April 25 | Iowa Crush | Home | Won | 14–8 |
| May 9 | Madison Blaze | Home | Lost | 8–14 |
| May 16 | Nebraska Stampede | Home | Lost | 0–14 |
| May 23 | Wisconsin Warriors | Away | Won | 40–0 |
| May 30 | Madison Blaze | Away | Won | 12–7 |
| June 13 | Iowa Crush | Away | Won | 28–14 |

=== 2016 ===
| Date | Opponent | Home/Away | Result | Score |
|---|---|---|---|---|
| April 9 | Rocky Mountain Thunder Katz | Away | Won | 14–7 |
| April 16 | Iowa Crush | Home | Won | 41–0 |
| April 30 | Madison Blaze | Away | Won | 21–0 |
| May 7 | Detroit Pride | Home | Won | 46–0 |
| May 14 | Iowa Crush | Away | Won | 33–0 |
| May 28 | Detroit Pride | Away | Won | 58–6 |
| June 4 | Madison Blaze | Home | Won | 29–0 |
| June 11 | Rocky Mountain Thunder Katz | Home | Won | Forfeit |
| July 9 (Conference Championship) | New York Sharks | Home | Won | 40–34 |
| July 22 (World Championship) | Utah Falconz | Away | Lost | 6–49 |

=== 2017 ===
| Date | Opponent | Home/Away | Result | Score |
|---|---|---|---|---|
| April 1 | Madison Blaze | Away | Won | 44–0 |
| April 8 | Minnesota Machine | Away | Won | 62–2 |
| April 22 | Nebraska Stampede | Home | Won | Forfeit |
| April 29 | Kansas City Titans | Home | Won | 41–0 |
| May 6 | Chicago Force | Away | Loss | 0–53 |
| May 20 | Kansas City Titans | Away | Won | 54–14 |
| May 27 | St Louis Slam | Home | Loss | 21–35 |
| June 3 | Minnesota Machine | Home | Won | Forfeit |
| June 10 WFA Playoffs Div I Round 1 | Kansas City Titans | Home | Won | 40–6 |
| June 17 WFA Playoffs Div I Round 2 | Dallas Elite | Away | Loss | 0–53 |

=== 2018 ===
| Date | Opponent | Home/Away | Result | Score |
|---|---|---|---|---|
| April 7 | Madison Blaze | Away | Won | 46–0 |
| April 14 | Wisconsin Dragons | Away | Won | 40–6 |
| April 21 | Kansas City Titans | Home | Won | 33–25 |
| April 28 | Detroit Dark Angels | Away | Won | 22–6 |
| May 5 | Columbus Vanguards | Home | Won | 40–0 |
| May 19 | Madison Blaze | Home | Won | Forfeit |
| June 2 | Wisconsin Dragons | Home | Won | 48–0 |
| June 9 | Kansas City Titans | Away | Loss | 19–47 |
| June 30 WFA Playoffs Div II Round 2 | Wisconsin Dragons | Home | Won | 35–7 |
| July 14 WFA Div II American Conference Championship | Mile High Blaze | Home | Won | 29–6 |
| July 27 WFA Div II National Championship | New York Sharks | Home | Loss | 21–27 |

=== 2019 ===
| Date | Opponent | Home/Away | Result | Score |
|---|---|---|---|---|
| April 6 | Kansas City Titans | Away | Won | 17–13 |
| April 20 | Wisconsin Dragons | Home | Won | 35–6 |
| May 4 | Kansas City Titans | Home | Won | 7–0 |
| May 11 | Wisconsin Dragons | Away | Won | 50–0 |
| May 18 | Iowa Phoenix | Home | Won | 59–0 |
| May 25 | St Louis Slam | Away | Loss | 14–31 |
| June 1 | Wisconsin Dragons | Home | Won | Forfeit |
| June 8 | Iowa Phoenix | Away | Won | 52–6 |
| June 15 WFA Regional Championships | St Louis Slam | Away | Loss | 8–16 |

=== 2020 ===
No season due to COVID-19

=== 2021 ===
| Date | Opponent | Home/Away | Result | Score |
|---|---|---|---|---|
| May 1 | Iowa Phoenix | Home | WON | 56–0 |
| May 22 | Iowa Phoenix | Away | WON | 62–6 |
| May 29 | Sioux Falls Snow Leopards | Home | WON | 66–0 |
| June 5 | Arlington Impact | Away | WON | 49–6 |
| June 12 | Sioux Falls Snow Leopards | Away | WON | Forfeit |
| June 19 | Dallas Elite Mustangs | Home | WON | 51–14 |
| June 26 WFA Playoffs Round I | Arlington Impact | Home | WON | 24–14 |
| July 10 WFA American Conference Championship Div 1 | Cali War | Home | WON | 33–22 |
| July 24 WFA National Championship Div 1 | Boston Renegades | Away | Loss | 26–42 |

=== 2022 ===
| Date | Opponent | Home/Away | Result | Score |
|---|---|---|---|---|
| April 9 | Iowa Phoenix | Home | WON | 55–0 |
| April 16 | St Louis Slam | Home | WON | 41–6 |
| April 30 | Nevada Storm | Away | Loss | 26–28 |
| May 7 | Arlington Impact | Home | WON | 42–26 |
| May 21 | St Louis Slam | Away | Loss | 18–20 |
| May 28 | Nebraska Valkyries | Away | WON | 49–6 |
| June 11 WFA Playoffs Round I | Nevada Storm | Home | WON | 27–10 |
| June 25 WFA Pro American Conference Championship | Cali War | Home | WON | 36–30 |
| July 10 WFA Pro National Championship | Boston Renegades | Away | Loss | 12–32 |

=== 2023 ===
Regular season

| Week | Date | Opponent | Result | Record |
|---|---|---|---|---|
| 1 | April 22 | at St. Louis Slam | L 0–20 | 0–1 |
| 2 | April 29 | Nebraska Pride | W 55–12 | 1–1 |
| 3 | Bye | | | |
| 4 | May 13 | Houston Energy | W 28–14 | 2–1 |
| 5 | May 20 | St. Louis Slam | L 0–24 | 2–2 |
| 6 | Bye | | | |
| 7 | June 3 | at Nebraska Pride | W 21–6 | 3–2 |
| 8 | June 10 | at Cali War | W 35–32 | 4–2 |

Postseason

| Week | Date | Opponent | Result | Record |
|---|---|---|---|---|
| Round 1 | June 24 | Houston Energy | W 38–34 | 1–0 |
| AC Championship | July 8 | at St. Louis Slam | L 27–44 | 1–1 |

=== 2024 ===
Regular season

| Week | Date | Opponent | Result | Record |
|---|---|---|---|---|
| 1 | Bye | | | |
| 2 | May 4 | St. Louis Slam | L 40–41 | 0–1 |
| 3 | May 11 | Dallas Elite Mustangs | W 64–30 | 1–1 |
| 4 | May 18 | at Iowa Phoenix | W 55–0 | 2–1 |
| 5 | Bye | | | |
| 6 | June 1 | at D.C. Divas | W 42–34 | 3–1 |
| 7 | June 8 | Nebraska Pride | W 34–0 | 4–1 |
| 8 | June 15 | at St. Louis Slam | L 7–42 | 4–2 |

Postseason

| Week | Date | Opponent | Result | Record |
|---|---|---|---|---|
| Round 1 | June 29 | Mile High Blaze | W 35–13 | 1–0 |
| AC Championship | July 13 | at St. Louis Slam | L 3–20 | 1–1 |

=== 2025 ===
Regular season

| Week | Date | Opponent | Result | Record |
|---|---|---|---|---|
| 1 | April 26 | Nebraska Pride | W 41–0 | 1-1 |
| 2 | Bye | | | |
| 3 | May 10 | at St. Louis Slam | L 27–34 | 1–1 |
| 4 | May 17 | D.C. Divas | W 40–16 | 2–1 |
| 5 | Bye | | | |
| 6 | May 31 | St. Louis Slam | L 19-42 | 2-2 |
| 7 | June 7 | at Cali War | L 61-64 | 2-3 |
| 8 | June 14 | at Nebraska Pride | W 35-0 | 3-3 |

Postseason

| Week | Date | Opponent | Result | Record |
|---|---|---|---|---|
| Round 1 | June 28 | Cali War | W 37–26 | 1–0 |
| AC Championship | July 12 | at St. Louis Slam | L 13–38 | 1–1 |

=== 2026 ===
Regular season

| Week | Date | Opponent | Result | Record |
|---|---|---|---|---|
| 1 | April 25 | at St. Louis Slam | W 24–7 | 1-0 |
| 3 | May 2 | Mile High Blaze | W 62–20 | 2–0 |
| 4 | May 9 | at Houston Energy | W 56–6 | 3–0 |
| 6 | May 16 | Dallas Mustangs | W 58-0 | 4-0 |
| 2 | Bye | | | |
| 7 | May 30 | St. Louis Slam | L 10-7 | 4-1 |
| 8 | June 6 | at Tampa Bay Inferno | W 55-21 | 5-1 |
| 5 | Bye | | | |

Postseason

| Week | Date | Opponent | Result | Record |
|---|---|---|---|---|
| Round 1 | June 27 | St. Louis Slam | W 37–16 | 1–0 |
| AC Championship | July 11 | at Salt Lake City Wildcats | | |
