= Memphis Dynasty =

- Founded: 2010
- League: Women's Football Alliance (2010–2012); United States Women's Football League(2013–present)
- Team history: Memphis Soul (2010); Memphis (2011); Memphis Dynasty (2012); Memphis Dynasty (2013–present)
- Based in: Memphis, Tennessee
- Stadium: Evangelical Christian School
- Colors: Black, gold, white
- Head coach: David Gilchrist

The Memphis Dynasty is a team of the United States Women's Football League which began play for the 2010 season in the Women's Football Alliance. Based in Memphis, Tennessee, home games were played at Evangelical Christian School.

For its inaugural season, the Dynasty was known as the Memphis Soul, in the season thereafter, they went without a nickname. In 2012, the team adopted the nickname "Dynasty". After 3 seasons in the WFA, the team moved to the WSFL and continued to play as the Dynasty until the end of the 2014 season. At the end of the 2014 season, the team decided to disband. There were four players that played with the franchise all five years, Ashley Bembow-Scarbough, Terri Gilchrist, Jessica (JP) Plunkett, and Sharon Tatum. The head coach was David Gilchrist.

Over the five years of play, the Dynasty compiled a winning percentage of 78.7% (37–10). The Dynasty won four division titles (2 in WFL and 2 in WSFL), two conference titles (American WSFL), and two national titles (WSFL). Individual league year end honors were 2010 Offensive Player of the Year – WFA (Jessica "JP" Plunkett), 2012 Defensive Player of the Year – WFA (Sharon Tatum), 2013 League MVP – WSFL (GT Shuttles), 2013 Championship Game MVP – WSFL (GT Shuttles), 2013 Coach of the Year – WSFL (David Gilchrist), 2014 League MVP – WSFL (Terri Gilchrist), 2014 Championship Game MVP – WSFL (Anglica "Jelly" Wilson), and 2014 Coach of the Year – WSFL (David Gilchrist). In addition, players received weekly honors as offensive or defensive player of the week (JP Plunkett, Sharon Tatum, Lori Conklin, Shae Blackwell, Tonya Dean).

== Season-by-season ==
Season records
Season	W	L	T	Finish	Playoff results
Memphis Soul (WFA)
2010	6	2	0	1st American Southern	Lost American Conference Quarterfinal (Austin)
Memphis (WFA)
2011	8	2	0	1st American Southeast	–
Memphis Dynasty (WFA)
2012	5	5	0	2nd WFA American 13	–
Memphis Dynasty (WSFL)
2013	9	0	0	1st American Conference	WSFL National Champions
Memphis Dynasty (WSFL)
2014	8	1	0	1st American Conference	WSFL National Champions
Totals	37	10	0	(including playoffs)	

* = Current Standing

== 2010 ==
=== Season schedule ===
Date	Opponent	Home/Away	Result
April 10	New Orleans Blaze	Away	Won 34–32
April 17	Oklahoma City Lightning	Home	Won 1–0**
April 24	Acadiana Zydeco	Home	Won 30–6
May 15	Lone Star Mustangs	Away	Lost 0–55
May 22	Acadiana Zydeco	Away	Won 20–0
June 5	Acadiana Zydeco	Home	Won 20–8
June 12	New Orleans Blaze	Away	Won 8–6
June 12	Austin Outlaws (American Conference Quarterfinal)	Away	Lost 0–35

** = Won by forfeit

== 2011 ==
=== Standings ===
2011 Southeast Division
	W	L	T	PCT	PF	PA	DIV	GB	STK
y-Memphis	6	2	0	0.750	258	95	4-0	---	W2
Little Rock Wildcats	3	5	0	0.375	124	202	2-2	3.0	W1
Tulsa Eagles	0	8	0	0.000	14	330	0-4	6.0	L8

=== Season schedule ===
Date	Opponent	Home/Away	Result
April 9	Little Rock Wildcats	Home	Won 38–14
April 16	Acadiana Zydeco	Away	Won 54–14
April 30	Tulsa Eagles	Away	Won 66–6
May 14	New Orleans Blaze	Away	Lost 14–15
May 21	Tulsa Eagles	Home	Won 56–0
May 28	Arkansas Rampage (WSFL)	Home	Won 36–0
June 4	Dallas Diamonds	Home	Lost 0–44
June 11	Little Rock Wildcats	Away	Won 30–8
June 18	New Orleans Blaze	Home	Won 1–0**
October 1	Arkansas Rampage (WSFL)	Neutral (Little Rock, AR)	Won 40–0

** = Won by forfeit

== 2012 ==
=== Season schedule ===
Date	Opponent	Home/Away	Result
April 14	Arkansas Rampage (WSFL)	Away	
April 21	Arkansas Wildcats	Away	
April 28	New Orleans Blaze	Home	
May 5	Tulsa Threat	Home	
May 12	Arkansas Rampage (WSFL)	Home	
May 19	Tulsa Threat	Away	
May 26	Arkansas Wildcats	Home	
June 2	Derby City Dynamite	Home	
June 9	St. Louis Slam	Away	
June 16	Arkansas Wildcats	Away	
