= Arkansas Wildcats =

Football team in Little Rock, Arkansas, United States

- Founded: 2010
- League: Women's Football Alliance
- Team history: Little Rock Wildcats (2011, 2013); Arkansas Wildcats (2012, 2015–)
- Based in: Little Rock, Arkansas
- Stadium: Quigley Stadium
- Colors: Black, red, and white
- Owner: Ernest Dukes III
- Championships: 1

The Arkansas Wildcats are a team of the Women's Football Alliance which began play for the 2011 season. Based in Little Rock, Arkansas the Wildcats played their home games on the campus of Little Rock Central High School.

In 2011 and 2013, the Wildcats were known as the Little Rock Wildcats.

== Statistics and records ==
=== Season-by-season results ===
Season records
Season	W	L	T	Finish	Playoff results
2011	3	5	0	2nd American Southeast	--
2012	5	4	0	1st American South Central	Lost American Conference Wild Card (Lone Star)
2013	5	4	0	1st American Gulf Coast	Lost American Conference Wild Card (Austin)
2015	2	6	0	3rd American Gulf Coast	--
2016	0	0	0	inactive	--
2017	6	2	0	3rd American South West	Won Div. III American Conference Semifinal (Austin); Won Div. III American Conference Final (S. Oregon); Won Div. III National Championship (Orlando)
Totals	15	19	0		

== 2011 ==
=== Standings ===
2011 Southeast Division
	W	L	T	PCT	PF	PA	DIV	GB	STK
y-Memphis	6	2	0	0.750	258	95	4-0	---	W2
Little Rock Wildcats	3	5	0	0.375	124	202	2-2	3.0	W1
Tulsa Eagles	0	8	0	0.000	14	330	0-4	6.0	L8

=== Season schedule ===
Date	Opponent	Home/Away	Result
April 2	Tulsa Eagles	Home	Won 44-0
April 9	Memphis	Away	Lost 14-38
April 16	New Orleans Blaze	Away	Lost 14-22
May 7	Acadiana Zydeco	Home	Won 38-8
May 14	Dallas Diamonds	Home	Lost 0-64
June 4	Lone Star Mustangs	Away	Lost 0-40
June 11	Memphis	Home	Lost 8-30
June 18	Tulsa Eagles	Away	Won 1-0**

** = Won by forfeit

== 2012 ==
=== Season schedule ===
Date	Opponent	Home/Away	Result
April 14	Memphis Dynasty	Away	Lost 34-0
April 28	Acadiana Zydeco	Home	Won 18-8
May 12	Tulsa Threat	Home	
May 19	Arkansas Rampage (WSFL)	Home	
June 2	Acadiana Zydeco	Away	
June 9	Tulsa Threat	Away	
June 16	Memphis Dynasty	Home	
