= Kansas City Tribe =

- Founded: 2008
- League: IWFL (2008-2010); WFA (2011-2017)
- Team history: Kansas City Tribe (2008-present)
- Based in: Kansas City, Missouri
- Stadium: Center High School
- Colors: Blue, red
- Owner: Mindy White; Colin Stoner
- Head coach: Ed Williams
- Championships: 1 (2009 IWFL)

The Kansas City Tribe is a football team in the Women's Football Alliance based in Kansas City, Missouri. Home games are played at Center High School.

== History ==
=== 2008 ===
Founded by Colin Stoner, John Van Sittert, and Mindy White, the Tribe began as a member of the Independent Women's Football League and was their return to the Kansas City market after the Kansas City Storm left for the NWFA. In their inaugural season, the Tribe finished at 4-4, good for second place in the Mid-South Division.

=== 2009 ===
The Tribe's breakout year would be its sophomore one, however. Finishing at 7–1, the Tribe clinched its first ever playoff spot and Midwest Division title. In the storm-heavy first-round game against the Los Angeles Amazons, the Tribe was trailing 14-6 late in the fourth quarter; however, late heroics would give them the 19–14 win, paving the way for the Western Conference title game against division rival Chicago Force (at whose hands the Tribe endured its only defeat of the regular season). That game was much more lopsided, with the Tribe pulling out the 40–16 win and the Western Conference championship. The Tribe won the IWFL Tier I World Championship on July 25, defeating the previously unbeaten Eastern Conference champion D.C. Divas, 21–18, at Round Rock ISD Athletic Stadium in Round Rock, Texas (a suburb of Austin).

=== 2010 ===
Although they finished 6–2, that was still not enough for a playoff berth (missing by .028 percentage points), finishing third in the Midwest Division behind the Dallas Diamonds and Chicago Force.

=== 2011 ===
In the Tribe's first WFA season, they finished 7–1, good for the Midwest Division title and a return trip to the playoffs. After defeating the Minnesota Machine 51–0 in the first round, the Tribe fell to the Dallas Diamonds 20–23 in an epic battle decided in overtime.

== Season-by-season ==
Season records
Season	W	L	T	Finish	Playoff results
Kansas City Tribe (IWFL)
2008	4	4	0	2nd Tier I West Mid-South	--
2009	7	1	0	1st Tier I West Midwest	Won Western Conference Semifinal (Los Angeles); Won Western Conference Championship (Chicago); Won IWFL Tier I World Championship (D.C.)
2010	6	2	0	3rd Tier I West Midwest	--
Kansas City Tribe (WFA)
2011	7	1	0	1st American Midwest	Won American Conference Quarterfinal (Minnesota); Lost American Conference Semifinal (Dallas)
2012*	7	1	0	--	Won American Conference Quarterfinal (Kansas City); Lost American Conference Semifinal (Dallas)
Totals	36	11	0	(including playoffs)	

* = Current standing

== 2009 ==
=== Season schedule ===
Date	Opponent	Home/Away	Result
April 11	Minnesota Vixen	Home	Won 45-8
April 18	Iowa Crush	Away	Won 62-0
May 2	Chicago Force	Away	Lost 6-28
May 9	Wisconsin Warriors	Home	Won 58-0
May 16	Clarksville Fox	Home	Won 48-6
May 30	Chicago Force	Home	Won 30-14
June 6	Wisconsin Warriors	Away	Won 19-12
June 13	Minnesota Vixen	Away	Won 65-0
June 27	Los Angeles Amazons (Western Conference Semifinal)	Home	Won 19-14
July 11	Chicago Force (Western Conference Championship)	Home	Won 40-16
July 25	D.C. Divas (IWFL Tier I World Championship)	Neutral (Round Rock)	Won 21-18

== 2010 ==
=== Season schedule ===
Date	Opponent	Home/Away	Result
April 3	Iowa Crush	Away	Won 77-0
April 10	Dallas Diamonds	Home	Won 28-21
April 24	Wisconsin Wolves	Home	Won 55-0
May 1	Chicago Force	Away	Lost 12-14
May 8	Wisconsin Warriors	Home	Won 44-0
May 15	Minnesota Vixen	Away	Won 80-0
May 22	Dallas Diamonds	Away	Lost 21-35
June 5	Chicago Force	Home	Won 30-12

== 2011 ==
=== Standings ===
2011 Midwest Division
	W	L	T	PCT	PF	PA	DIV	GB	STK
y-Kansas City Tribe	7	1	0	0.875	520	68	5-0	---	W3
Iowa Xplosion	5	3	0	0.625	119	230	2-3	2.0	L1
Nebraska Stampede	3	5	0	0.375	136	178	2-3	4.0	W2
Kansas City Spartans	3	5	0	0.375	112	269	1-4	4.0	W1

=== Season schedule ===
Date	Opponent	Home/Away	Result
April 2	Kansas City Spartans	Away	Won 77-0
April 9	Iowa Xplosion	Away	Won 82-0
April 16	Kansas City Spartans	Home	Won 76-0
April 30	Nebraska Stampede	Away	Won 88-0
May 7	Chicago Force	Away	Lost 26-34
May 14	St. Louis Slam	Home	Won 37-34
May 21	Wisconsin Wolves	Home	Won 57-0
June 4	Iowa Xplosion	Home	Won 77-0
June 25	Minnesota Machine (American Conference Quarterfinal)	Home	Won 51-0
July 9	Dallas Diamonds (American Conference Semifinal)	Away	Lost 20-23

== 2012 ==
=== Season schedule ===
Date	Opponent	Home/Away	Result
April 14	Chicago Force	Home	Lost 14-21
April 21	St. Louis Slam	Home	Won 33-14
April 28	Tulsa Threat	Away	Won 95-0
May 5	Kansas City Spartans	Home	Won 67-6
May 19	Minnesota Machine	Away	Won 13-0 *Game called in 1st due to weather
June 2	Nebraska Stampede	Home	Won 53-6
June 9	Kansas City Spartans	Away	Won 83-0
June 16	St. Louis Slam	Away	Won 63-42
June 30	St. Louis Slam (American Conference Quarterfinal)	Home	Won 42-17
July 7	Dallas Diamonds (American Conference Semifinal)	Away	Lost 47-28
