= Tulsa Threat =

Women's football team

- Founded: 2011
- League: Women's Football Alliance
- Team history: Tulsa Eagles (2011); Tulsa Threat (2012–future)
- Based in: Tulsa, Oklahoma
- Stadium: Catoosa High School
- Colors: Black, Green & White
- Owner: Player-owned
- Head coach: Tarrion Adams
- Championships: 0

The Tulsa Threat is one of two active women's tackle football teams in Oklahoma. They began play during the 2011 season as the Tulsa Eagles. They are a member of the Women's Football Alliance, a nationally ranked 41-team women's football league that plays 11-on-11, NCAA rules football during the spring. Based in Tulsa, Oklahoma, the Threat plays in Tulsa at LaFortune Stadium on the campus of Memorial High School. In 2012, they produced 4 All-Americans and 5 All-Americans in 2013.

== Season-by-season ==
Season records
Season	W	L	T	Finish	Playoff results
Tulsa Eagles (WFA)
2011	0	8	0	3rd American Southeast	–
Tulsa Threat (WFA)
2012	2	6	0	3rd WFA American 13	–
2013	3	5	0	2nd WFA American 13	–
2014*	0	0	0		–
Totals	5	19	0		

* = Current standing

== 2014 ==
=== Current Season schedule ===
Date	Opponent	Home/Away	Result
April 12	Kansas City Titans	Away	
April 19	Acadiana Zydeco	Home	
April 26	Louisiana Jazz	Away	
May 3	Nebraska Stampede	Away	
May 10	Louisiana Jazz	Home	
May 17	Arlington Impact	Home	
May 24	Kansas City Titans	Home	
June 7	Acadiana Zydeco	Away	

== 2011 ==
=== Standings ===
2011 Southeast Division
	W	L	T	PCT	PF	PA	DIV	GB	STK
y-Memphis	6	2	0	0.750	258	95	4-0	---	W2
Little Rock Wildcats	3	5	0	0.375	124	202	2-2	3.0	W1
Tulsa Eagles	0	8	0	0.000	14	330	0-4	6.0	L8

=== Past Season Results ===
Date	Opponent	Home/Away	Result
April 2	Little Rock Wildcats	Away	Lost 0–44
April 9	Austin Outlaws	Away	Lost 8–68
April 30	Memphis	Home	Lost 6–66
May 7	Lone Star Mustangs	Home	Lost 0–40
May 21	Memphis	Home	Lost 0–64
June 4	Acadiana Zydeco	Home	Lost 0–44
June 11	Dallas Diamonds	Away	Lost 0–1
June 18	Little Rock Wildcats	Home	Lost 0–1**

** = Forfeited

== 2012 ==
=== Past Season Results ===
Date	Opponent	Home/Away	Result
April 14	Austin Outlaws	Away	Lost 7–6
April 21	Memphis Dynasty	Away	Lost 18–6
April 28	Kansas City Tribe	Home	Lost 94–0
May 5	Bye Week		
May 12	Arkansas Wildcats	Away	Lost 36–16
May 19	Memphis Dynasty	Home	Won 14–6
June 2	Austin Outlaws	Home	Won 21–19
June 9	Arkansas Wildcats	Home	Lost 34–14
June 16	Lone Star Mustangs	Away	Lost 40–0

== 2013 ==
=== Past Season Results ===
Date	Opponent	Home/Away	Result
April 6	Austin Outlaws	Away	Lost 10–50
April 20	Lone Star Mustangs	Home	Lost 10–54
April 27	Little Rock Wildcats	Away	Won 28–8
May 4	New Orleans Mojo	Home	Won 37–0
May 11	Acadiana Zydeco	Home	Won 9–8
May 18	Little Rock Wildcats	Away	Lost 28–56
June 1	Little Rock Wildcats	Home	Lost 16–28
June 8	Acadiana Zydeco	Away	Lost 8–26
