= Austin Outlaws =

American women's football team

- Founded: 2001
- League: Women's Football Alliance
- Team history: IWFL (2001–2002); NWFA (2003–2008); WFA (2009–present)
- Based in: Austin, Texas
- Stadium: House Park
- Colors: Black, silver, red
- President: Lily Messina
- Head coach: Jason Barlow
- Championships: 1 (2001)
- Mascot: Annie Outlaw

The Austin Outlaws are a women's football team in the Women's Football Alliance. They are based in Austin, Texas. Home games are played at historic House Park in downtown Austin.

Founded in 2001 as a charter member of the Independent Women's Football League, the Outlaws finished 5–1, good enough for the first IWFL championship (playoffs were not held that year).

The following year of 2002, the Outlaws finished 7-2 and made the IWFL playoffs. After defeating the Corvallis Pride in the qualifier, the Outlaws fell 24–4 to the New York Sharks in the championship game.

In 2003 the Outlaws moved to the National Women's Football Association, where they would spend their next six seasons. That inaugural season was only as an exhibition team, and the Outlaws finished with a 1–1 record.

For 2004, the Outlaws became a full-time member of the NWFA. Despite finishing with a 5–3 record (second place in the Southwest Division), the Outlaws missed the playoffs.

In 2005, the Outlaws again missed the playoffs, finishing at 4-4 and ninth place in the Southern Division.

2006 was the year the Outlaws returned to the postseason, finishing at 6-2 and second place in the South West Division. However, their playoff exit was quick, losing 23–6 to the Chattanooga Locomotion in the first round.

2007 showed the Outlaws with another second-place finish in the Southern Conference West Division at 5–3. That was again not good enough for the postseason.

In 2008, again the Outlaws finished 5-3 (for third place in the South Central Division this time), and again missed the postseason. After the season, the Outlaws announced their move to the Women's Football Alliance.

The 2009 season brought a division championship back home to Austin. With a record of 7–1, the Outlaws traveled to Jacksonville to play against the Dixie Blues. Though the Outlaws were defeated, they remain proud that they beat the tough Lone Star Mustangs twice in order to earn that title.

== Season-by-season ==
Season records
Season	W	L	T	Finish	Playoff results
Austin Outlaws (IWFL)
2001	5	1	0	1st League	Declared IWFL Champions (based on regular season record)
2002	8	4	0	2nd Western Conference	Won Western Conference Championship (Corvallis); Lost IWFL Championship (New York)
Austin Outlaws (NWFA)
2003	1	1	0	X-Team	--
2004	5	3	0	2nd Southern Southwest	--
2005	4	4	0	9th Southern	--
2006	6	3	0	2nd Southern Southwest	Lost Southern Conference Quarterfinal (Chattanooga)
2007	5	3	0	2nd Southern West	--
2008	5	3	0	3rd Southern Central	--
Austin Outlaws (WFA)
2009	7	2	0	1st American Southwest	Lost American Conference Semifinal (Jacksonville)
2010	6	4	0	2nd American Southwest	Won American Conference Quarterfinal (Memphis); Lost American Conference Semifinal (Las Vegas)
2011	3	5	0	3rd American South Central	--
2012	1	7	0	4th American Southwest	--
2013	7	3	0	2nd American Southwest	Won American Conference Wild Card (Little Rock); Lost American Conference Quarterfinal (Dallas)
2014	8	2	0	1st American Southwest	Won American Conference Quarterfinal (Minnesota); Lost American Conference Semifinal (Kansas City)
2015	2	6	0	4th American Southwest	--
2016	1	7	0	2nd WFA3 American Midwest	--
Totals	74	58	0		

== 2010 ==
=== Season schedules ===
Date	Opponent	Home/Away	Result
April 10	Houston Power	Home	Won 7-6
April 17	Monterrey Royal Eagles	Home	Won 54-0
May 1	Acadiana Zydeco	Away	Won 68-0
May 8	Lone Star Mustangs	Home	Lost 16-35
May 22	New Orleans Blaze	Home	Won 51-0
June 5	Houston Power	Away	Lost 13-34
June 12	Lone Star Mustangs	Away	Lost 7-38
June 19	Houston Power	Home	Won 48-15
June 26	Memphis Soul	Away	Won 35-0
July 10	Las Vegas Showgirlz	Home	Lost 21-27

== 2011 ==
=== Standings ===
2011 South Central Division
	W	L	T	PCT	PF	PA	DIV	GB	STK
y-Dallas Diamonds	8	0	0	1.000	279	53	4-0	---	W8
Lone Star Mustangs	5	3	0	0.625	161	60	2-2	3.0	L1
Austin Outlaws	3	5	0	0.375	156	160	0-4	5.0	L1

=== Season schedule ===
Date	Opponent	Home/Away	Result
April 2	Lone Star Mustangs	Home	Lost 0-16
April 9	Tulsa Eagles	Home	Won 68-8
April 16	Lone Star Mustangs	Away	Lost 3-33
April 30	Houston Power	Away	Lost 6-16
May 7	Dallas Diamonds	Away	Lost 21-31
May 21	New Orleans Blaze	Home	Won 52-0
June 11	Acadiana Zydeco	Away	Won 1-0**
June 18	Dallas Diamonds	Home	Lost 0-56

** = Won by forfeit

== 2012 ==
=== Season schedule ===
Date	Opponent	Home/Away	Result
April 14	Tulsa Threat	Home	
April 28	Lone Star Mustangs	Away	
May 5	Houston Power	Away	
May 12	Dallas Diamonds	Home	
May 19	Lone Star Mustangs	Home	
June 2	Tulsa Threat	Away	
June 9	Dallas Diamonds	Away	
June 16	Houston Power	Home	
