= Kansas City Spartans =

Kansas City Spartans may refer to:

- Kansas City Spartans (basketball), a team which played in the American Basketball Association for the 2008–09 season
- Kansas City Spartans (American football), a women's American football team who play in the Women's Football Alliance
