= Kansas City Titans (American football) =

- Founded: 2007
- League: Women's Football Alliance
- Team history: Kansas City Titans (2013 - 2019); Kansas City Spartans (2007 - 2013)
- Based in: Shawnee Mission, Kansas
- Stadium: Shawnee Mission North District Stadium, Shawnee Mission North High School
- Colors: Kelly green, navy blue, silver
- President: Nyala Bulock, Monica Cheirs
- Head coach: Leonard Bulock
- Championships: 0

The Kansas City Titans (formerly the Kansas City Spartans) were an American football team in the Women's Football Alliance who began play in the 2010 WFA season. Based in Kansas City, Kansas, the Spartans play their home games on the campus of Shawnee Mission North High School in nearby Shawnee Mission.

The Spartans are one of two WFA teams in the Kansas City metropolitan area, with the Spartans playing on the Kansas side and the Kansas City Tribe playing in Kansas City, Missouri.

Katie Sowers was the Titans' general manager, offensive coordinator and quarterback for a period of time.

== Season-by-season ==
Season records
Season	W	L	T	Finish	Playoff results
2010	3	5	0	3rd American Midwest	--
2011	3	5	0	4th American Midwest	--
2012*	1	3	0	3rd WFA National 11	--
Totals	7	13	0		

* = Current standing

== 2010 ==
=== Season schedule ===
Date	Opponent	Home/Away	Result
April 17	Iowa Thunder	Home	Lost 8-22
May 1	Nebraska Stampede	Away	Won 32-18
May 8	Minnesota Machine	Home	Lost 12-13
May 15	Iowa Thunder	Away	Lost 0-24
May 22	Nebraska Stampede	Away	Won
June 5	Minnesota Machine	Away	Lost 8-22
June 12	Nebraska Stampede	Home	Won 28-6
June 19	Iowa Thunder	Home	Lost 14-33

== 2011 ==
=== Standings ===
2011 Midwest Division
	W	L	T	PCT	PF	PA	DIV	GB	STK
y-Kansas City Tribe	7	1	0	0.875	520	68	5-0	---	W3
Iowa Xplosion	5	3	0	0.625	119	230	2-3	2.0	L1
Nebraska Stampede	3	5	0	0.375	136	178	2-3	4.0	W2
Kansas City Spartans	3	5	0	0.375	112	269	1-4	4.0	W1

=== Season schedule ===
Date	Opponent	Home/Away	Result
April 2	Kansas City Tribe	Home	Lost 0-77
April 9	Nebraska Stampede	Home	Won 14-12
April 16	Kansas City Tribe	Away	Lost 0-76
May 7	Wisconsin Wolves	Home	Lost 8-20
May 14	Wisconsin Dragons	Away	Won 20-8
May 21	Iowa Xplosion	Away	Lost 22-44
June 11	Nebraska Stampede	Away	Lost 18-32
June 18	Wisconsin Dragons	Home	Won 30-0

== 2012 ==
=== Season schedule ===
Date	Opponent	Home/Away	Result
April 14	Wisconsin Wolves	Away	
April 21	Iowa Xplosion	Home	
April 28	St. Louis Slam	Away	
May 5	Kansas City Tribe	Away	
May 19	Nebraska Stampede	Home	
June 2	St. Louis Slam	Home	
June 9	Kansas City Tribe	Home	
June 16	Iowa Xplosion	Away	
