= Louisiana Fuel =

- Founded: 2005
- League: Independent Women's Football League
- Team history: Louisiana Fuel (2008-2010)
- Based in: Zachary, Louisiana
- Stadium: Zachary High School
- Colors: Orange & black
- Owner: Christie Moll
- Head coach: Welton Wardell
- Championships: 0

The Louisiana Fuel was a football team in the Independent Women's Football League based in Baton Rouge, Louisiana. Home games were played at the Zachary High School in nearby Zachary.

== Season-By-Season ==
Season records
Season	W	L	T	Finish	Playoff results
Baton Rouge Women's Tackle (IWFL)
2007	1	6	0	3rd West Midsouth	--
Louisiana Fuel (IWFL)
2008	1	7	0	3rd Tier II Midsouth	--
2009	0	6	0	20th Tier II	--
2010*	1	2	0	6th Tier II East Southeast	--
Totals	8	34	0		

* = Current Standing

== Season Schedules ==
=== 2009 ===
Date	Opponent	Home/Away	Result
April 11	Shreveport Aftershock	Away	Lost 18–32
April 18	Dallas Diamonds	Home	Lost 0-27
May 2	Tennessee Valley Tigers	Home	Lost 27–32
May 9	Palm Beach Punishers	Away	Lost 0-28
May 16	Dallas Diamonds	Away	Lost 0-64
May 30	Shreveport Aftershock	Away	Lost 36–65

=== 2010 ===
Date	Opponent	Home/Away	Result
April 3	H-Town Texas Cyclones	Away	Won 2–0**
April 10	Houston Energy	Away	Lost 0-60
April 17	Iowa Crush	Home	Lost 14–16
April 24	Palm Beach Punishers	Home	
May 1	H-Town Texas Cyclones	Away	
May 8	Tennessee Valley Tigers	Home	
May 15	Houston Energy	Home	
June 5	H-Town Texas Cyclones	Home	

** = Won by forfeit
