= Lone Star Mustangs =

American football team

- Founded: 2008
- League: Women's Football Alliance
- Team history: Lone Star Mustangs (2009–2013)
- Based in: Bedford, Texas
- Stadium: Pennington Field
- Colors: black, vegas gold, and white
- President: Player-owned
- Head coach: Reginald Harvey
- Championships: 1 (2010 WFA)
- Mascot: Mustangs

The Lone Star Mustangs are a team of the Women's Football Alliance. Based in Bedford Texas (part of the Dallas-Fort Worth Metroplex), the Mustangs play their home games at Pennington Field (the campus was formerly M.B. Smiley High School).

== History ==
The Lone Star Mustangs played their first full season of women's full contact football in 2009 and ended the season at 6-2 after playing the H-Town Texas Cyclones and the Austin Outlaws and missed the playoffs by merely 1 point. In 2010, the second full season of play for the Mustangs, they won the Women's Football Alliance National Championship.

In 2009, the Mustangs were proud to have first team Women's Football Alliance All-Americans Ebony Jones at defensive end and Alex Harvey at defensive tackle. The Mustangs also had 3 honorable mention Women's Football Alliance All-Americans: Jennifer Hull- QB, Brittany Satterwhite - RB/WR, and Daniela Ottaiano - S. The Mustangs ended their first season with a roster of 52 players who put in an outstanding effort. The players ranged from 19 to 45 years of age and came from all types of different backgrounds.

The Mustangs team was originally owned and operated by Dallas - Fort Worth businesswoman LynMarie Liberty - Ellington. In 2010, she was named the WFA Owner of the Year. At the end of the 2011 season, LynMarie chose to allow the players and coaches to run the team, which will officially be player-owned in 2012.

== Coaching staff ==
=== 2012 Coaching Staff ===
- Twyla Smith - Defensive Coordinator
- Lacy Downs - Offensive Coordinator

=== 2011 Coaching Staff ===
- Mike "Duke" Ellington - Head Coach
- Amanda Lemon - Defensive Coordinator & Linebackers Coach
- Reginald Harvey - Offensive Coordinator & Backs/QB Coach
- Twyla Smith - Defensive Line Coach
- Lacy Downs - Offensive Line Coach
- Brandice Mueller - Wide Receivers Coach
- Brontavius Davis - Defensive Backs Coach
- Terrance Brown - Special Teams Coach
- Eric Luna - Offensive Line Assistant Coach

=== 2010 Coaching Staff ===
- Mike "Duke" Ellington - Head Coach & Offensive Line Coach
- Amanda Lemon - Defensive Coordinator & Linebackers/DBs Coach
- Scott Tribble - Offensive Coordinator & Backs/Receivers Coach
- Twyla Smith - Defensive Line Coach
- Andrea Bologna - Team Doctor

== League Recognition ==
- Odessa Jenkins - 2010 WFA League MVP - 2010 WFA Championship Game MVP - 2010 1st Team All-American (RB)
- Alex Harvey - 2010 WFA American Conference Defensive MVP - 2010 1st Team All-American DT - 2009 1st Team All-American DT
- Brittany Bushman - 2010 1st Team All-American (QB)
- Stephanie "Freight Train" Wakefield - 2010 1st Team All-American (FB)
- Melissa Beach - 2010 1st Team All-American (WR)
- Yo Grant - 2010 1st Team All-American (TE)
- Tamra Kelley - 2010 1st Team All-American (C)
- Lorrie Newman - 2010 1st Team All-American (DE)
- Jennifer Hull - 2010 1st Team All-American (LB) - 2009 Honorable Mention All-American (QB)
- Etta Maytubby - 2010 2nd Team All-American (TE)
- Brittany Satterwhite - 2009 Honorable Mention All-American (RB)
- Daniela Ottaiano - 2009 Honorable Mention All-American (S)
- Ebony Jones - 2009 1st Team All-American (DE)winner of the VH1 reality show I Want to Work for Diddy 2
- Lyn Ellington - 2010 WFA Owner of the Year

== 2010 Championship Team Roster ==
Number	Name	Position
3	Odessa Jenkins	RB/CB
4	Jennifer Hull	OLB/QB
5	Brittany Satterwhite	RB
6	Carmon Parkman	WR
7	Terri Smith	WR
8	Brittany Bushman	QB
16	Casey Ray-Tribble	S
21	Rosa Gil	LB
22	Jay Jay Jones	DB
23	Whitney Washington	WR
24	Shan Woods	S
27	Tia Nunsant	S/OLB
28	Stuff Spencer	DB
31	Joy "Hybrid" Newkirk	Hybrid
32	Venessa Martinez	LB
33	Stephanie "Freight Train" Wakefield	FB
37	Etta Maytubby	TE
43	Melissa "CSI" Simmons	LB
46	Schannia Borchardt	Spec Teams
50	Lorrie Newman	DE
51	Yolanda "Yo" Grant	TE
54	Tamra "T" Kelley	C
55	Eboni "Vinnie" Vincentti	LB
59	Lacy "Bulldog" Downs	MLB
60	Marybeth "MB" Bauer	G
64	Kelanna "TaTa" Spiller	G
69	Jona "Boney" Boney	DT
70	Mary "Sister" Saville	G
72	Yvette "Psycho" Abrego	T/DT
73	Stephanie "Joos" Martin	T
74	Jamie "Red" Bearden	T
75	Jennifer "Zo" Alonso	T
82	Daniela Ottaiano	S/DB/LB/K/P
86	Melissa Beach	WR
90	Alex Harvey	DT
92	KB Bowman	DE/DT
93	Shion Ward	DT
94	Maddie Williams	DE
99	Deondra Selph	DE/DT

== Season-by-season ==
Season records
Season	W	L	T	Finish	Playoff results
2009	6	2	0	2nd American Southwest	--
2010	8	0	0	1st American Southwest	Won American Conference Quarterfinal (Pacific); Won American Conference Semifinal (Iowa); Won American Conference Championship (Las Vegas); Won WFA National Championship (Columbus)
2011	5	3	0	2nd American South Central	--
2012	6	2	0	2nd WFA American 12	Won American Conference Wild Card (Arkansas); Lost American Conference Quarterfinal (Dallas)
Totals	30	8	0	--	(including playoffs)

== 2009 ==
=== Season schedule ===
Date	Opponent	Home/Away	Result
April 18	East Texas Saberkats	Away	Won 6-0**
April 25	Austin Outlaws	Home	Lost 13-14
May 2	H-Town Texas Cyclones	Home	Won 20-12
May 9	Austin Outlaws	Away	Lost 14-28
May 16	H-Town Texas Cyclones	Away	Won 14-12
May 30	Austin Outlaws	Home	Won 28-14
June 13	East Texas Saberkats	Home	Won 6-0**
June 20	H-Town Texas Cyclones	Away	Won 31-0

== 2010 ==
=== Season schedule ===
Date	Opponent	Home/Away	Result
April 10	Oklahoma City Lightning	Home	Won 62-0
April 17	Houston Power	Away	Won 32-13
May 1	Houston Power	Home	Won 32-0
May 8	Austin Outlaws	Away	Won 38-16
May 15	Memphis Soul	Home	Won 55-0
May 22	Oklahoma City Lightning	Away	Won 1-0**
June 5	New Orleans Blaze	Away	Won 51-0
June 12	Austin Outlaws	Home	Won 38-7
June 19	Monterrey Royal Eagles	Home	Won 1-0**
June 26	Pacific Warriors (American Conference Quarterfinal)	Home	Won 38-14
July 10	Iowa Thunder (American Conference Semifinal)	Away	Won 30-20
July 17	Las Vegas Showgirlz (American Conference Championship)	Away	Won 8-6
July 31	Columbus Comets (WFA National Championship)	Away	Won 16-12

** = Won by forfeit

== 2011 ==
=== Standings ===
2011 South Central Division
	W	L	T	PCT	PF	PA	DIV	GB	STK
y-Dallas Diamonds	8	0	0	1.000	279	53	4-0	---	W8
Lone Star Mustangs	5	3	0	0.625	161	60	2-2	3.0	L1
Austin Outlaws	3	5	0	0.375	156	160	0-4	5.0	L1

=== Season schedule ===
Date	Opponent	Home/Away	Result
April 2	Austin Outlaws	Away	Won 16-0
April 16	Austin Outlaws	Home	Won 33-3
April 30	Dallas Diamonds	Home	Lost 6-16
May 7	Tulsa Eagles	Away	Won 40-0
May 14	Houston Power	Home	Won 14-6
May 21	Dallas Diamonds	Away	Lost 12-23
June 4	Little Rock Wildcats	Home	Won 40-0
June 11	Houston Power	Away	Lost 0-12

== 2012 ==
=== Season schedule ===
Date	Opponent	Home/Away	Result
April 14	North Texas Knockouts (WSFL)	Away	W
April 21	Dallas Diamonds	Away	L
April 28	Austin Outlaws	Home	W
May 12	Houston Power	Home	W
May 19	Austin Outlaws	Away	W
May 26	Dallas Diamonds	Home	L
June 2	Houston Power	Away	W
June 16	Tulsa Threat	Home	W
