= Minnesota Machine =

- Founded: 2008
- League: Women's Football Alliance
- Team history: Minnesota Machine (2009-2017)
- Based in: Minneapolis-Saint Paul
- Colors: Orange, Black, Grey
- Head coach: Doug Johnson (2012), Willie Howard (2011), Dann Lickness (2009-2010)
- Championships: 0

The Minnesota Machine was a women's tackle football team of the Women's Football Alliance (WFA) from 2009 to 2017. The team was started by Lisa Olson on December 8, 2008, after stints with the Indiana Speed and Minnesota Vixen, and began play in the WFA's inaugural 2009 season. Based in the Minneapolis-Saint Paul metropolitan area, the Machine played its home games at different locations in the area each year.

== Season-by-season ==
Season records
| Season | W | L | T | Finish | Playoff results |
|---|---|---|---|---|---|
| 2009 | 5 | 3 | 0 | 2nd American Midwest | -- |
| 2010 | 6 | 2 | 0 | 1st American Midwest | Lost AC Quarterfinal (Iowa) |
| 2011 | 5 | 3 | 0 | 1st American Upper Midwest | Lost AC Quarterfinal (Kansas City) |
| 2012 | 6 | 3 | 0 | 1st WFA American 10 | Lost AC Quarterfinal (St. Louis) |
| Totals | 22 | 11 | 0 | (including playoffs) | |

* = Current standing

== 2009 ==
=== Season schedule ===
| Date | Opponent | Home/Away | Result |
|---|---|---|---|
| April 25 | Iowa Thunder | Away | Lost 6-16 |
| May 2 | Missouri Phoenix | Home | Won 58-0 |
| May 9 | St. Louis Slam | Home | Lost 0-28 |
| May 16 | Kansas City Storm | Away | Won 58-0 |
| June 6 | St. Louis Slam | Away | Lost 7-42 |
| June 13 | Iowa Thunder | Home | Won 20-0 |
| June 20 | Missouri Phoenix | Away | Win 61-0 |
| June 27 | Kansas City Storm | Home | Won ** |

** = Won by forfeit

== 2010 ==
=== Season schedule ===
Home games were played at James Griffin Stadium in St. Paul, MN

| Date | Opponent | Home/Away | Result |
|---|---|---|---|
| April 10 | Nebraska Stampede | Home | Won 50-0 |
| April 17 | St. Louis Slam | Away | Lost 0-34 |
| May 1 | Iowa Thunder | Away | Won 7-21 |
| May 8 | Kansas City Spartans | Away | Won 12-13 |
| May 15 | Nebraska Stampede | Home | Won 34-0 |
| June 5 | Kansas City Spartans | Home | Won 22-8 |
| June 12 | Iowa Thunder | Home | Lost 13-21 |
| June 19 | Nebraska Stampede | Away | Won 13-12 |
| June 26 | Iowa Thunder (American Conference Quarterfinal) | Home | Lost 12-20 |

== 2011 ==
=== Standings ===
2011 Upper Midwest Division
| | W | L | T | PCT | PF | PA | DIV | GB | STK |
|---|---|---|---|---|---|---|---|---|---|
| y-Minnesota Machine | 5 | 3 | 0 | 0.625 | 150 | 117 | 4-0 | --- | W2 |
| Wisconsin Wolves | 4 | 4 | 0 | 0.500 | 144 | 207 | 2-2 | 1.0 | L1 |
| Wisconsin Dragons | 0 | 8 | 0 | 0.000 | 27 | 271 | 0-4 | 5.0 | L8 |

=== Season schedule ===
Home games were played at Einer Anderson Stadium in Minnetonka, MN

| Date | Opponent | Home/Away | Result |
|---|---|---|---|
| April 9 | Chicago Force | Away | Lost 69-0 |
| April 16 | Wisconsin Dragons | Home | Won 21-7 |
| April 30 | Wisconsin Wolves | Away | Won 27-6 |
| May 7 | Nebraska Stampede | Home | Won 6-0 |
| May 14 | Iowa Xplosion | Away | Lost 0-7 |
| June 4 | Wisconsin Dragons | Away | Won 46-0 |
| June 11 | Iowa Xplosion | Home | Lost 17-20 |
| June 18 | Wisconsin Wolves | Home | Won 33-8 |
| June 25 | Kansas City Tribe (American Conference Quarterfinal) | Home | Lost 0-51 |

== 2012 ==
=== Season schedule ===
Home games were played at Woodbury High School Stadium in Woodbury, MN

| Date | Opponent | Home/Away | Result |
|---|---|---|---|
| April 21 | St. Louis Slam | Home | Lost 59-0 |
| April 21 | Wisconsin Wolves | Home | Won 34-6 |
| April 28 | Nebraska Stampede | Away | Won 14-6 |
| May 5 | Wisconsin Dragons | Home | Won 41-0 |
| May 12 | Nebraska Stampede | Away | Won 38-0 |
| May 19 | Kansas City Tribe | Home | Lost 13-0 |
| June 9 | Wisconsin Wolves | Away | Won 34-24 |
| June 16 | Wisconsin Dragons | Away | Won 34-0 |
| June 23 | St. Louis Slam (American Conference Quarterfinal) | Away | Lost 42-6 |
