= East Texas Saberkats =

- Founded: 2008
- Folded: 2009
- League: Women's Football Alliance
- Team history: East Texas Saberkats 2008-2009
- Based in: Marshall, Texas
- Stadium: TBA
- Colors: Burnt orange, white
- President: Kirkland Trammer
- Head coach: Kirkland Trammer
- Championships: 0

The East Texas Saberkats were a team of the Women's Football Alliance. Based in Marshall, the Saberkats were originally going to play in the National Women's Football Association before moving to the WFA. On March 14, 2009, it was announced that the team had folded.

== Season-by-season ==
Season records
Season	W	L	T	Finish	Playoff results
2009	0	6	0	4th American Southwest	--

== 2009 Season Schedule ==
Date	Opponent	Home/Away	Result
April 18	Oklahoma City Lightning	Home	
April 25	Lone Star Mustangs	Away	
May 2	Austin Outlaws	Away	
May 9	Lone Star Mustangs	Home	
May 16	H-Town Texas Cyclones	Away	
June 6	Oklahoma City Lightning	Away	
June 13	Austin Outlaws	Home	
June 27	H-Town Texas Cyclones	Home	
