= Dallas Diamonds =

American women's professional football team

- Founded: 2002
- League: WPFL (2002-2007); IWFL (2008-2010); WFA (2011-2012)
- Team history: Dallas Diamonds (2002-2012)
- Based in: Bedford, Texas
- Stadium: Pennington Field
- Colors: Black, purple, silver
- Owner: Dawn Berndt
- Head coach: Todd Haisten, Todd Hughes, Patrick Hughes & Bobby Vadnais
- Championships: 4 (WPFL: 2004, 2005, 2006) (IWFL: 2008)

The Dallas Diamonds was a women's professional American football team in the Women's Football Alliance (WFA). The Diamonds won four national championships; the first three were all obtained during their membership in the Women's Professional Football League (WPFL) which was dissolved in 2008, and the fourth was in their first season in the Independent Women's Football League.

The Diamonds were made up of 46 players and a coaching staff of 10.

== History ==
The Diamonds franchise started in 2002 by owner Dawn Berndt. During the inaugural season, they finished with a 5–5 record. The following season, the Diamonds improved to 8-2 and entered the playoffs as a wild card team. They lost on their home field, Birdville Fine Arts Complex, to the Florida Stingrays.

In 2004, the Diamonds recruited a solid rookie class and moved through the season undefeated. They marched through the playoffs defeating the Houston Energy, So Cal Scorpions and eventually Northern Ice for their first title.

In 2005, the Diamonds continued the winning streak and finished the season undefeated. In the playoffs, they defeated the Houston Energy, SoCal Scorpions and New York Dazzles for their second title.

In 2006, the winning continued until the Diamonds broke the WPFL record with 33 straight wins. The loss came to the rival Houston Energy in Houston, TX. The league reorganized in 2006 and separated these two power house teams into different conferences. This provided what had been the two best teams statistically with an opportunity to face in the championship game. Both teams reached the Championship and fought back and forth with multiple lead changes until the Diamonds pulled ahead 34-27 early in the 4th quarter and never relinquished the lead.

In 2007, injuries and retirement plagued the franchise. In their first regular season without a playoff berth, management took a different approach. Offering her players an opportunity to play in a new league, several players came out of retirement to join the IWFL in 2008. Playing the Chicago Force in Chicago, the Diamonds won the 2008 IWFL Championship. The Diamonds currently play at Pennington Field in Bedford, Texas.

In 2009, the Diamonds finished another regular season undefeated, winning the South Atlantic Division title. However, they lost the Eastern Conference Semifinals to the Boston Militia, 34–14.

In 2010, the Diamonds won another division title, this time finishing first in the Midwest Division at 7–1. Though they defeated the Chicago Force 27–20 in the Western Conference Semifinals, they lost to the Sacramento Sirens 45–43 in the conference title game.

For the 2011–2013 seasons, the Diamonds played in the Women's Football Alliance.

== Notable players ==
=== Jessica Springer ===
Jessica Springer was the Diamond's starting running back and linebacker. In 2004, she was the WPFL Howington Award Winner which is awarded to the league MVP. She runs a 4.88 40-yd dash and holds powerlifting records in both the bench press and dead lift in her weight category. She retired briefly during 2007 and returned for the last half of the season. The Diamonds did not make it into the playoffs in 2007 and Springer returned in her best form for 2008. She led the league in TDs and averaged over 11 yards per carry. During the championship game, she was the heart and soul of the team. She had an interception and every TD the Diamonds scored on offense came on the ground in Springer's hands. She carried the ball 9 times in OT and scored up the middle from 11 yards out to secure the Diamonds 4th ring in 5 years. She has been recognized by Neal Rozendaal as one of the best players in women's football.

=== Karen Seimears ===
Karen Seimears was the Diamond's starting quarterback from 2003 to 2010. The Diamonds were 53–3 with Seimears under center. She was named a starter for the Pro Bowl for each year she played. She was recognized by Neal Rozenhaal as one of the top quarterbacks in the women's game. During the 2007 season, Seimears walked the sidelines as the offensive coach. She returned to the field for the 2008 season and led the Diamonds to their 4th title in 5 seasons. Seimears coached again in 2010 while pregnant with her first son.

=== Ring of Honor ===
Shelley Burnson, OL; Aurelia Green, OL; and Karen Seimears, QB; Jessica Springer, RB/LB; & Ivette Young, LB are in the Diamond's Ring of Honor. Their numbers have been retired and are displayed at each Diamonds home game.

== Championships ==
=== 2004 ===
The Diamonds took on the Northern Ice in WPFL Championship Game VI in Long Beach, California on November 20, 2004. The final score was Dallas Diamonds 62, Northern Ice 13. Seimears threw 4 passing TDs and Dallas dominated on the ground as well. The MVP was Q Ragsdale, running back for Dallas.

=== 2005 ===
The Diamonds played the New York Dazzles in WPFL Championship Game VII at the Birdville Fine Arts/Athletic Complex in North Richland Hills, Texas on November 19, 2005. The final score was 61–8, Diamonds.

=== 2006 ===
The Diamonds played the Houston Energy in WPFL Championship Game VIII in Roswell, Georgia on November 4, 2006. Monica Foster and the Dallas defense took over in the second half after the Diamonds fell behind and dominated from her safety position with two late INTs to seal the win. The final score was 34–27, Diamonds

=== 2008 ===
The Diamonds played the Chicago Force in IWFL Championship Game, in Chicago, Illinois on July 25, 2008. The Diamonds won in overtime 35–29. Jessica Springer was the game MVP and announced her retirement after the game. Coach Todd Hughes also announced his retirement.

== Season-by-season ==
Season records
Season	W	L	T	Finish	Playoff results
Dallas Diamonds (WPFL)
2002	4	5	0	3rd American	--
2003	7	3	0	2nd American West	Lost American Conference Championship (Florida)
2004	12	0	0	1st American South	Won Divisional Playoffs (Houston); Won American Conference Championship (So Cal); Won WPFL Championship (Northern)
2005	11	0	0	1st American South	Won American Conference Championship (So Cal); Won WPFL Championship (New York)
2006	8	1	0	1st American West	Won American Conference Championship (So Cal); Won WPFL Championship (Houston)
2007	5	3	0	3rd American West	--
Dallas Diamonds (IWFL)
2008	11	0	0	1st Western Mid South	Won Western Conference Semifinal (California); Won Western Conference Championship (Seattle); Won IWFL Championship (Chicago)
2009	8	1	0	1st Eastern South Atlantic	Lost Eastern Conference Semifinal (Boston)
2010	8	2	0	1st Western Midwest	Won Western Conference Semifinal (Chicago); Lost Western Conference Championship (Sacramento)
Dallas Diamonds (WFA)
2011	10	1	0	1st American South Central	Won American Conference Quarterfinal (Houston); Won American Conference Semifinal (Kansas City); Lost American Conference Championship (San Diego)
2012	10	1	0	1st American Southwest	Won American Conference Quarterfinal (Lone Star); Won American Conference Semifinal (Kansas City); Lost American Conference Championship (San Diego)
2013	11	1	0	1st American Southwest	Won American Conference Quarterfinal (Austin); Won American Conference Semifinal (St. Louis); Won American Conference Championship (Central Cal); Lost WFA Championship (Chicago)
Totals	105	18	0	(including playoffs)	

== 2009 ==
=== Season schedule ===
Date	Opponent	Home/Away	Result
April 11	Houston Energy	Home	Won 69-0
April 18	Louisiana Fuel	Away	Won 27-0
April 25	Shreveport Aftershock	Home	Won 59-0
May 2	Atlanta Xplosion	Away	Won 32-7
May 16	Louisiana Fuel	Home	Won 64-0
May 30	Miami Fury	Home	Won 41-8
June 6	Houston Energy	Away	Won 61-20
June 13	Houston Energy	Home	Won 76-7
June 27	Boston Militia (Eastern Conference Semifinal)	Away	Lost 14-34

== 2010 ==
=== Season schedule ===
Date	Opponent	Home/Away	Result
April 3	Houston Energy	Home	Won 34-12
April 10	Kansas City Tribe	Away	Lost 21-28
April 24	Minnesota Vixen	Home	Won 79-0
May 1	Memphis Belles	Away	Won 49-6
May 8	Atlanta Xplosion	Home	Won 23-3
May 15	H-Town Texas Cyclones	Away	Won 2-0*
May 22	Kansas City Tribe	Home	Won 35-21
June 5	Houston Energy	Away	Won 44-36
June 12	Chicago Force (Midwest Division Championship)	Home	Won 27-20
July 10	Sacramento Sirens (Western Conference Championship)	Away	Lost 43-45

** = Won by forfeit

== 2011 ==
=== Standings ===
2011 South Central Division
	W	L	T	PCT	PF	PA	DIV	GB	STK
y-Dallas Diamonds	8	0	0	1.000	279	53	4-0	---	W8
Lone Star Mustangs	5	3	0	0.625	161	60	2-2	3.0	L1
Austin Outlaws	3	5	0	0.375	156	160	0-4	5.0	L1

=== Season schedule ===
Date	Opponent	Home/Away	Result
April 9	Houston Power	Home	Won 39-14
April 30	Lone Star Mustangs	Away	Won 16-6
May 7	Austin Outlaws	Home	Won 31-21
May 14	Little Rock Wildcats	Away	Won 64-0
May 21	Lone Star Mustangs	Home	Won 23-12
June 4	Memphis	Away	Won 44-0
June 11	Tulsa Eagles	Home	Won 1-0**
June 18	Austin Outlaws	Away	Won 56-0
June 26	Houston Power (American Conference Quarterfinal)	Home	Won 21-6
July 9	Kansas City Tribe (American Conference Semifinal)	Home	Won 23-20
July 16	San Diego Surge (American Conference Championship)	Away	Lost 20-48

** = Won by forfeit

== 2012 ==
=== Season schedule ===
Date	Opponent	Home/Away	Result
April 14	Houston Power	Away	
April 21	Lone Star Mustangs	Home	
May 5	Arkansas Wildcats	Home	
May 12	Austin Outlaws	Away	
May 19	Houston Power	Home	
May 26	Lone Star Mustangs	Away	
June 2	North Texas Knockouts (WSFL)	Away	
June 9	Austin Outlaws	Home	

== Coaching staff ==
Todd Haisten 2003-2004 Head Coach WPFL Championship 2004 Record 20-3 Todd Hughes 2003-2004 Offensive Coordinator, Head Coach 2005-2008 WPFL Championship 2005–2006, IWFL Championship 2008 Record 37-4 Pat Hughes Rec Coach 2004- Defensive Coordinator 2005-2008 Mikal Black 2004 Defensive Line Coach, And 1st asst. Brian Bishop HC 2009, 10-1 Patrick Hughes HC 2010–2011, 22–2, Karen Seimears OC 2010, Ryan Hopkins RB/WR Coach 2010–2011, OC 2011. Bobby Vadnais 2010 Defensive Coordinator, 2011 Head Coach 10-1

== Media ==
During the season, the Diamonds host a weekly talk-show formatted webcast. It is produced by BISD TV (Comcast channel 30 in Dallas/Fort Worth). The games are also often broadcast on Ustream.tv by BISD TV.

== Gallery ==
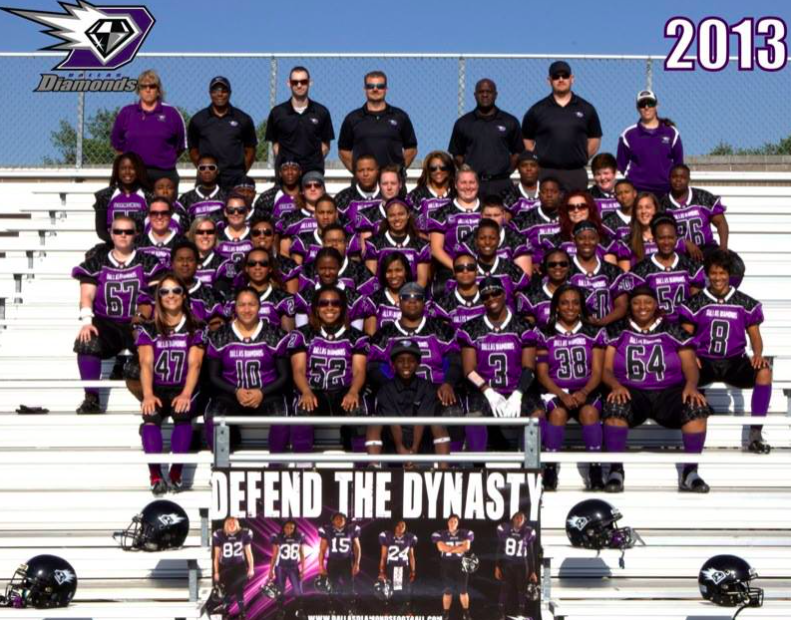

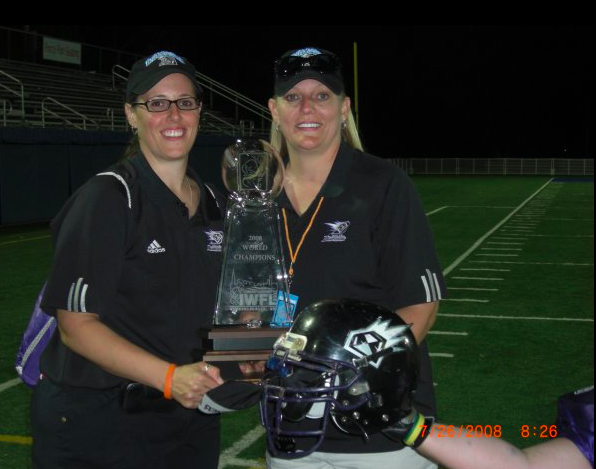

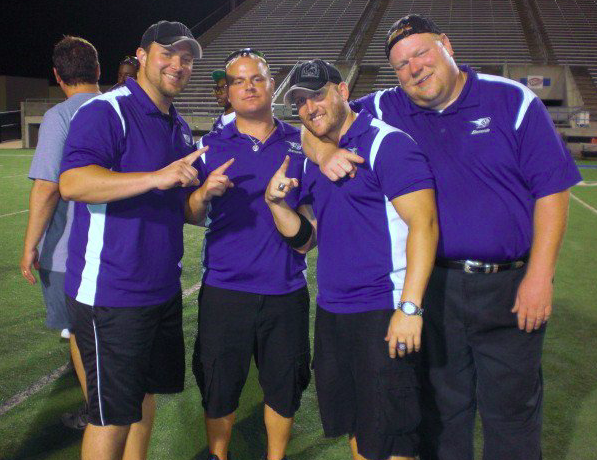

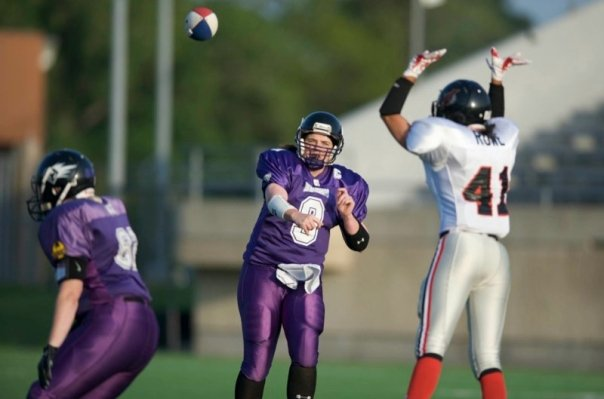

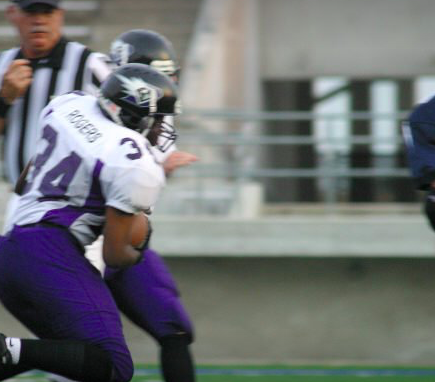

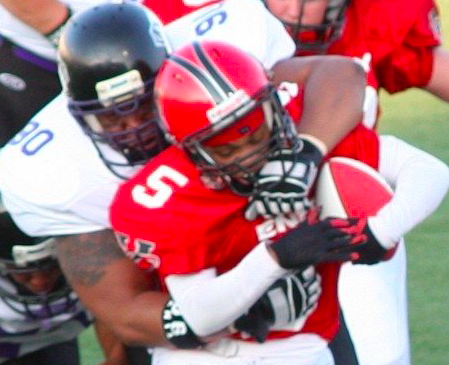

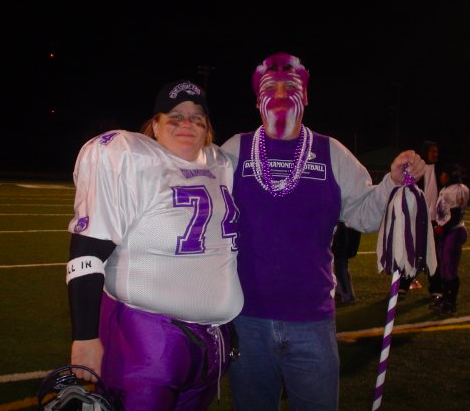

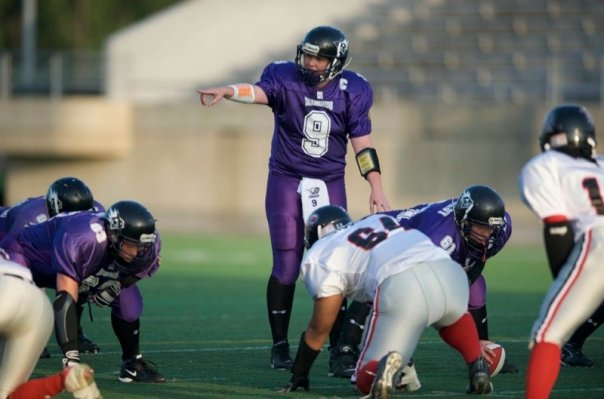

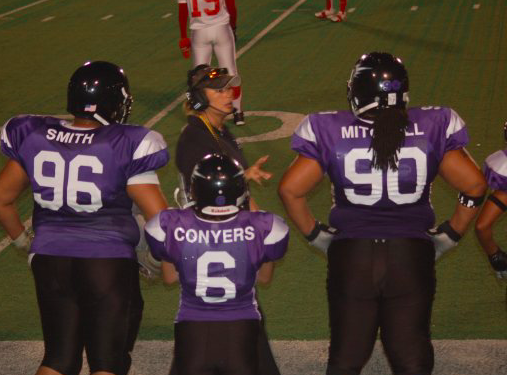

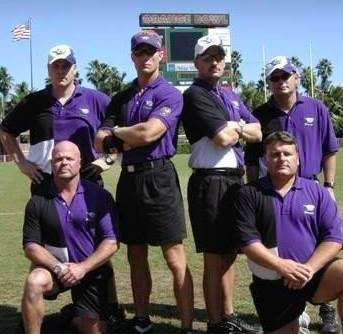

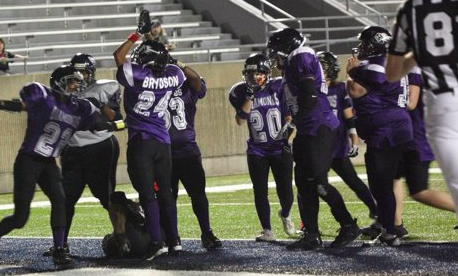

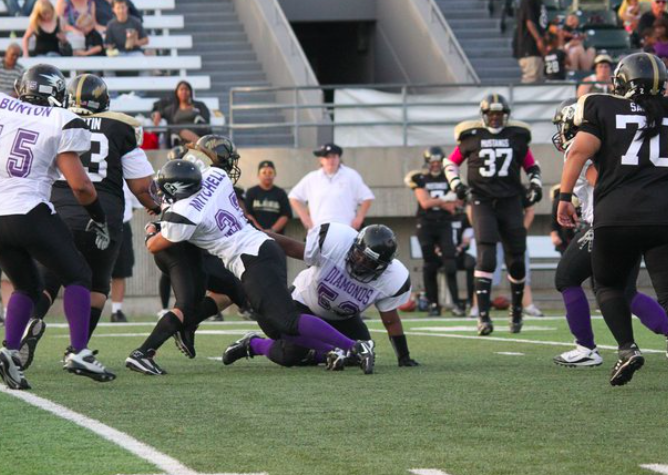

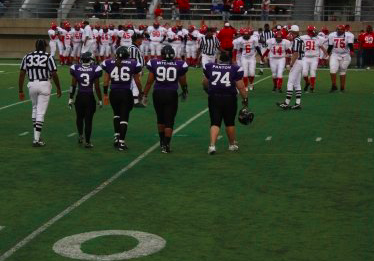

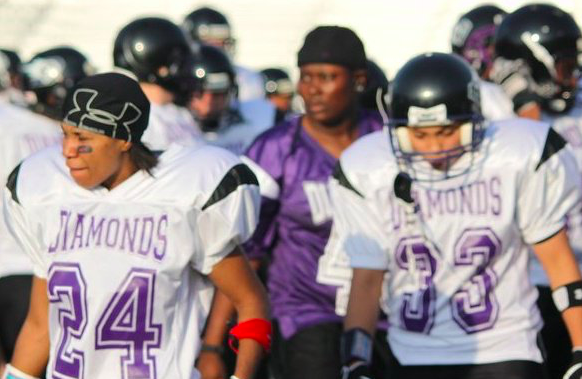

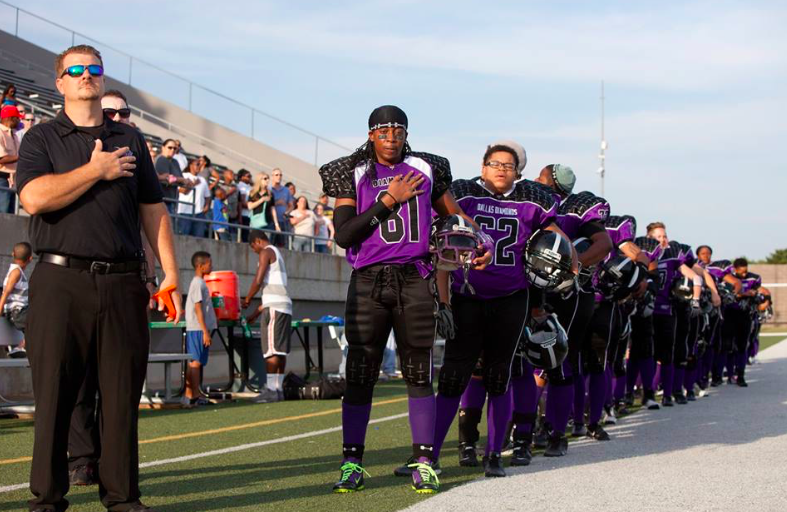

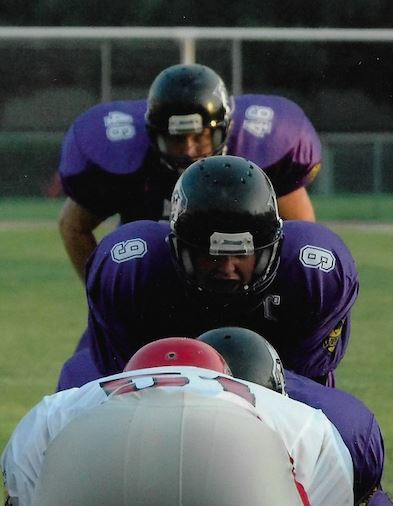

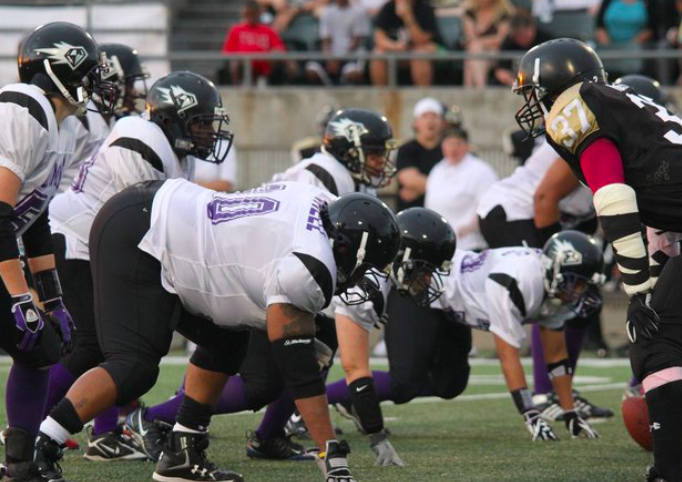

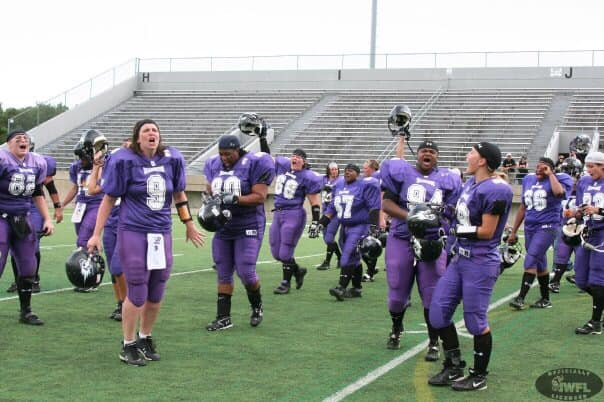

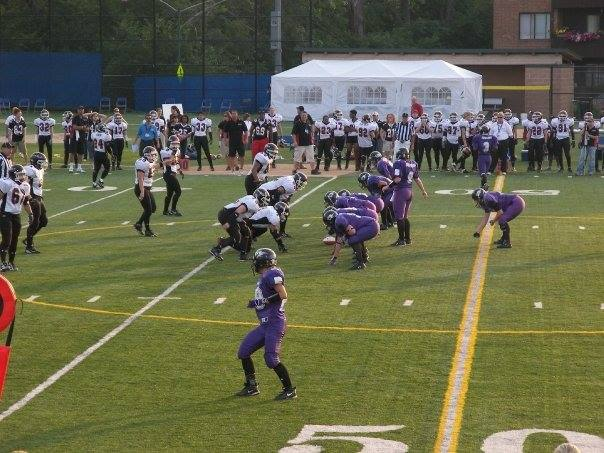

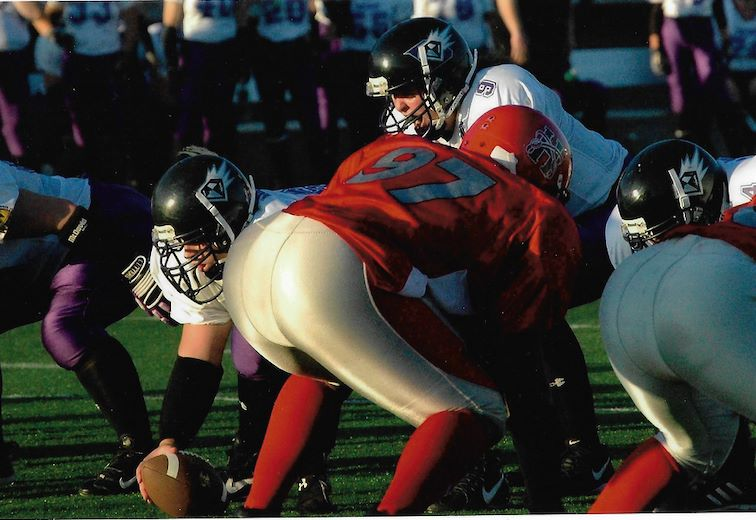
