= Shreveport Aftershock =

Former women's football team in Shreveport, Louisiana

- Founded: 2007
- League: Independent Women's Football League
- Team history: Shreveport Aftershock (2007-2009)
- Based in: Shreveport, Louisiana
- Stadium: Independence Stadium
- Colors: Black, blue, and yellow
- Owner: Joan C. Catanese
- Head coach: Thomas Emerson
- Championships: 0

The Shreveport Aftershock was a football team in the Independent Women's Football League based in Shreveport, Louisiana. Home games were played at Independence Stadium.

== Season-by-season ==
Season records
Season	W	L	T	Finish	Playoff results
Shreveport Aftershock (IWFL)
2007	2	5	0	2nd West Midsouth	--
2008	4	4	0	2nd Tier II Midsouth	--
2009	2	4	0	15th Tier II	--
Totals	8	13	0		

== 2009 season schedule ==
Date	Opponent	Home/Away	Result
April 11	Louisiana Fuel	Home	Won 32–18
April 25	Dallas Diamonds	Away	Lost 0-59
May 2	Chattanooga Locomotion	Away	Lost 0-62
May 9	Houston Energy	Home	Lost 6-40
May 23	Houston Energy	Away	Lost 0-49
May 30	Louisiana Fuel	Home	Won 65–36
