= Wisconsin Wolves =

Wisconsin football team

- Founded: 2006
- League: Women's Football Alliance
- Team history: Wisconsin Wolves (WPFL) (2006-2007); Wisconsin Wolves (IWFL) (2008-2010); Wisconsin Wolves (WFA) (2011-2012)
- Based in: Wausau, Wisconsin
- Stadium: Stiehm Stadium
- Colors
- Owner: Mark and Mary Dearth
- Head coach: Mark Dearth
- Championships: 0
- Mascot: Wolfy

The Wisconsin Wolves were a Women's Football Alliance (WFA) team based in Wausau, Wisconsin. The team was founded in 2006 and played their home games at Lussier Stadium on the campus of Madison La Follette High School. The Wolves were the third Wisconsin WPFL franchise founded in the state (following the Wisconsin Riveters and the Kenosha Northern Ice). They transferred to the IWFL in 2008. In 2010, The Wisconsin Wolves announced they were moving the team to Wausau, Wisconsin. They joined the Women's Football Alliance (WFA) shortly after. They began playing in 2011.

The Wolves completed their inaugural (2006) regular season with a record of (5-3). Their 2007 season ended in the same way, 5-3 in the regular season and 1-1 in the playoffs. The Wolves played in the National Conference Championship in their first two seasons of existence.

== Season-by-season ==
Season records
Season	W	L	T	Finish	Playoff results
Wisconsin Wolves (WPFL)
2006	5	2	0	2nd National Central	Won National Conference Qualifier (Indiana); Lost National Conference Championship (Houston)
2007	5	3	0	2nd National Central	Won National Conference Qualifier (Indiana); Lost National Conference Championship (Houston)
Wisconsin Wolves (IWFL)
2008	4	4	0	3rd Tier I East Midwest	--
2009	X-Team - Results Unknown/Not Counted				
2010	4	4	0	3rd Tier II West Midwest	--
Wisconsin Wolves (WFA)
2011	4	4	0	2nd American Upper Midwest	
2012	4	4	0	2nd WFA American 10	--
Totals	24	19	0	(including playoffs)	

== 2011 ==
=== Standings ===
2011 Upper Midwest Division
	W	L	T	PCT	PF	PA	DIV	GB	STK
y-Minnesota Machine	5	3	0	0.625	150	117	4-0	---	W2
Wisconsin Wolves	4	4	0	0.500	144	207	2-2	1.0	L1
Wisconsin Dragons	0	8	0	0.000	27	271	0-4	5.0	L8

=== Season schedule ===
Date	Opponent	Home/Away	Result
April 2	Wisconsin Dragons	Away	Won 20-12
April 16	Chicago Force	Home	Lost 0-58
April 30	Minnesota Machine	Home	Lost 6-27
May 7	Kansas City Spartans	Away	Won 20-8
May 21	Kansas City Tribe	Away	Lost 0-57
June 4	Nebraska Stampede	Home	Won 24-12
June 11	Wisconsin Dragons	Home	Won 66-0
June 18	Minnesota Machine	Away	Lost 8-33

== 2012 ==
=== Season schedule ===
Date	Opponent	Home/Away	Result
April 14	Kansas City Spartans	Home	Lost 15-21
April 21	Minnesota Machine	Away	Lost 6-35
April 28	Wisconsin Dragons	Away	Won 30-21
May 5	Nebraska Stampede	Home	Won 24-8
May 19	Wisconsin Dragons	Home	Won 54-0
June 2	Wisconsin Dragons	Away	Lost 6-27
June 16	Nebraska Stampede	Away	Won 6-0
