= New England Storm =

New England Storm
Founded	2000
Arena	Hormel Stadium
Based in	Medford, Massachusetts
Colors	Red and Blue
League	Women's Professional Football League

The New England Storm was a women's professional football team.

The New England Storm originated when in 2000, Melissa "Missi" Korpacz, contacted the Women's Professional Football League to ask about bringing a team to the New England area. After much negotiation, Korpacz was offered the opportunity to join the WPFL as the owner of the first women's professional football team in New England. Korpacz accepted, pushing aside her Special Education Advocacy Law practice. That year, to get her team started, Korpacz recruited coaching, medical, front office staff and top female athletes. To raise revenue Korpacz secured corporate and marketing partnerships with companies such as Coca-Cola, New England Patriots, Harpoon, Boston Beer Works, Mt. Auburn Hospital, Hard Rock Café, Sam Adams, Fox Sports Net, NFL, PAX TV, and Mohegan Sun Casino, just to name a few. In their second season, the New England Storm won the National Conference Championship and were runners-up to the Houston Energy for the Women's Professional Football League Championship.

The Storm were originally based in Providence, Rhode Island, but after a year Korpacz relocated the team to Medford, Massachusetts, two miles north of Boston, MA where they played at Hormel Stadium. The New England Storm had a commercial relationship with the New England Patriots, being the only women's team to ever have a commercial relationship with an NFL team.

On February 8, 2001, as a result of the effort of Rhode Island Senator Lincoln Chafee, Korpacz and the New England Storm Women's Professional Football Team became a part of United States Congressional history. The transcript of the address that Senator Chafee Presented to Congress can be found at
