= Iowa Thunder =

- Founded: 2008
- Folded: 2011
- League: WFA (2008-2010); WSFL (2011)
- Based in: Des Moines, Iowa
- Colors: Blue, Gold, Grey, White

The Iowa Thunder was a women's professional American football team based in Des Moines, Iowa. They played in the Women's Spring Football League.

During its first two seasons, the Thunder was a member of the Women's Football Alliance

== History ==
In their Inaugural season, the Thunder became the first team in Iowa history to have a winning record at 5-3 and followed that up in 2010 with a 6-2 campaign that left them tied for 1st in the division (although they lost the tiebreaker to the Minnesota Machine based on head-to-head points total) and the first ever team to garner a playoff berth. The Thunder defeated the Machine 20–12 in the first round, but lost to the eventual WFA champion Lone Star Mustangs 30–20 in the conference semifinals.

== Season-by-season ==
Season records
Season	W	L	T	Finish	Playoff results
Iowa Thunder (WFA)
2009	5	3	0	2nd American Midwest WFA	--
2010	6	2	0	Tied 1st American Midwest WFA	Won American Conference Quarterfinal (Minnesota); Lost American Conference Semifinal (Lone Star)
Iowa Thunder (WSFL)
2011	--	--	--	--	--
Totals	12	6	0	(including playoffs)	
