= Dallas Elite =

Dallas Elite Mustangs
- Founded: 2014
- League: WFA (2015–)
- Team history: Dallas Elite Mustangs (2020–); Dallas Elite (2015–2019)
- Based in: Plano, Texas
- Stadium: Prestonwood Christian Academy
- Colors: blue, white, and red
- Owner: Maria Spencer
- Championships: 1 (2017)
- Conference titles: 3 (2015, 2016, 2017)
- Website: dallaselitewomensfootball.com

The Dallas Elite Women's Football team is an American women's tackle football team playing in Division I of the Women's Football Alliance (WFA). The team, based in and around Dallas, Texas, was founded in 2014. The Dallas Elite reached the national championship game three years in a row from 2015 to 2017. They defeated the Boston Renegades 31–21 at Highmark Stadium in Pittsburgh on July 22, 2017, to win the WFA Division I National Championship. Although they missed the playoffs in 2018 and 2019 (and the 2020 season was cancelled due to the COVID-19 pandemic), the team earned a playoff berth in 2021.

The team rebranded as the Dallas Elite Mustangs in 2020. The 2021 Dallas Elite Mustangs are owned by Maria Spencer. The head coach is Coach Hamilton. The team plays home games at Alfred J. Loos Athletic Complex in Addison and Prestonwood Christian Academy in Plano.

== Standings ==
=== 2016 standings ===
2016 WFA Division 1 American Conference (Regular Season)
CR	NR		W	L	T	PCT	PF	PA	SOS	STK
1	1	x,y - Dallas Elite	7	0	0	1.000	446	39	4	W7
2	4	x,y - Cali War	6	0	0	1.000	439	26	13	W6
3	6	x - Kansas City Titans	4	1	0	.800	245	131	5	W1
4	7	x - Pacific Warriors	5	1	0	.833	297	133	12	L1
5	8	x - Portland Shockwave	6	0	0	1.000	343	32	28	W6
6	14	Seattle Majestics	6	1	0	.857	232	97	30	L1
7	16	x - Arlington Impact	4	2	0	.666	228	209	11	W2

x - clinched playoff berth
y - clinched first round bye

=== 2021 standings ===
2021 WFA Division 1 — National Conference (Regular Season)
CR	NR		W	L	T	PCT	PF	PA	SOS	STK
1	1	^{x} Boston Renegades	5	0	0	1.000	291	9	2	W5
2	2	^{x} D.C. Divas	1	3	0	.250	57	140	1	L3
3	4	^{x} Tampa Bay Inferno	6	0	0	1.000	237	20	21	W6
2021 WFA Division 1 — American Conference (Regular Season)
1	3	^{x} Minnesota Vixen	6	0	0	1.000	162	26	29	W6
2	7	^{x} Cali War	6	1	0	.857	202	48	17	W2
3	10	^{x} Arlington Impact	4	2	0	.666	130	82	11	L2
4	22	^{x} Dallas Elite	3	3	0	.500	96	149	23	L1

x - clinched playoff berth
