= Kansas City Storm =

Women's tackle football team based in Kansas City, Missouri

- Founded: 2004
- Based in: Kansas City, Missouri
- Stadium: North Kansas City High School
- Colors: Navy Blue, Red, White
- President: Nance Wernes
- Mascot: "Stormie" The Dog

The Kansas City Storm is a women's tackle football team based in Kansas City, Missouri. The Storm was founded in 2004 and has been serving Kansas City area women since then with a mission to "provide a safe, positive and fun opportunity for women in Kansas City and surrounding areas to play tackle football." Home games are played April–June at North Kansas City High School Stadium in nearby North Kansas City.

== History ==
The Kansas City Storm made their first public appearance at local radio station WHB 810 Sports' 5th annual Turkey Bowl fundraiser. On November 18, 2004, the Kansas City Storm played on behalf of radio station 97.3 The Planet. The game was televised on the MetroSports network of Time-Warner Cable. The Storm/Planet team won 30–26.

On Saturday, June 11, 2005, the Kansas City Storm became the first women's tackle football team to host and play in a full, regulation tackle football game in an active NFL stadium. Following the Kansas City Wizards vs. New England Revolution MLS soccer match, the Storm took the field against the Detroit Predators at Arrowhead Stadium. The Storm was victorious over the Predators in the historic game by a score of 20–6.

After the 2005 season closed, the Kansas City Storm played a pregame scrimmage at Bill Snyder Family Stadium (Kansas State University) to open the Kansas Shrine Bowl on July 30, 2005.

One of the Storm's worst defeats came from cross-state rival St. Louis Slam on April 20, 2009, beaten 77–0.

In May 2009, the Storm played an away game against the Iowa Thunder in the Susan G. Komen Kickoff for the Cure fundraiser to fight breast cancer.

The Kansas City Storm had game-day footage and commentary available on Blip.

In 2010, a fundraiser alongside Advanced Financial Solutions was held with a theme of "helping women with their New Year's resolutions".

Due to its central location, Kansas City has a natural affinity for creating rivals. Two counties west on I-70, the Topeka Mudcats are one such rival. The Storm beat the Mudcats in the latter's inaugural game on May 1, 2010.

The Kansas City Storm presented the Introduction to Football for Women boot-camp, after which the participants played at Kemper Arena prior to April 27, 2013, indoor football game of the Kansas City Renegades.

== Season-by-season ==
Season records
Season	W	L	T	Finish	Playoff results
Kansas City Storm (IWFL)
2005	4	5	1	2nd West Midwest	—
2006	3	5	0	3rd West Midwest	—
2007	6	3	0	1st West Midsouth	Lost Western Conference Semifinals (Detroit)
Kansas City Storm (NWFA)
2008	2	6	0	3rd South Midwest	—
Kansas City Storm (WFA)
2009	0	8	0	3rd American Midwest	—
Kansas City Storm (WSFL)
2010	7	0	0	1st WSFL Midwest Conference	— No playoff provided by WSFL
Kansas City Storm (Independent)
2011	0	1	0		
Totals	22	28	1	(including playoffs)	

== 2010 undefeated season ==
Date	Opponent	Home/Away	Result
May 1	Topeka Mudcats	Home	Win 21–0
May 15	River City Raiders	Home	Win 62–0
May 22	River City Raiders	Away	Win 21–15
May 29	Bye	Bye	Bye
June 5	Topeka Mudcats	Away	Win 36–0
June 12	River City Raiders	Home	Win 52–8
June 19	Topeka Mudcats	Home	Win 30–7
June 26	Topeka Mudcats	Away	Win 30–6

** = Won by forfeit *** = Forfeited
