= Arkansas Rampage =

Women's football team

- Founded: 2010
- League: Women's Spring Football League
- Team history: Arkansas Rampage (2011-2012)
- Based in: Rogers, Arkansas
- Stadium: Veterans Stadium
- Colors: Blue, black, white
- Owner: James Burkheart/Jerry Rogers
- Championships: 0

The Arkansas Rampage was a women's football team based in Rogers, Arkansas. The team participated in the Women's Spring Football League in 2011 and 2012.

== Season-by-season ==
Season records
Season	W	L	T	Finish	Playoff results
2011	4	2	0	2nd League	--
2012	2	7	0	2nd National	Lost National Conference Championship (DFW)
Totals	6	9	0		
