= Iowa Crush =

- Founded: 2004
- League: Independent Women's Football League
- Team history: Des Moines Courage (2004–2005); Iowa Crush (2006–present)
- Based in: Martensdale, Iowa
- Stadium: Martensdale-St. Marys Stadium
- Colors: Navy blue, sky blue, orange
- Owner: Jenifer McIntire
- Head coach: Dedric Ward

The Iowa Crush are a women's tackle football in the Independent Women's Football League. Founded in 2004, they train at the Martensdale-St. Marys Stadium, and previously played at the Valley Stadium in West Des Moines, along with the Des Moines Menace and the Valley Tigers.

The Crush are composed of talents from all across Iowa.

== Community ==
They have often taken part in activities for the local community, such as trivia nights, try-outs, community service, schools visits, and parades. Their primary goal is to promote the idea of women playing in under-represented sports such as American football, by producing a fun and safe environment both on and off the field.

== Coaching ==
Over the years the team have been coached by multiple eminent American football players, such as Dedric Ward.

== Season-By-Season ==
Season records
Season	W	L	T	Finish	Playoff results				
Des Moines Courage (IWFL)
2004	1	3	0	X-Team	–	PS	30	PA	126
2005	2	6	0	X-Team	–	PS	112	PA	228
Iowa Crush (IWFL)
2006	4	4	0	X-Team	–	PS	162	PA	195
2007	2	6	0	4th West Midwest	–	PS	70	PA	246
2008	0	8	0	3rd West Mid-South	–	PS	13	PA	354
2009	0	8	0	23rd Tier II	–	PS	41	PA	276
2010*	3	5	0	5th Tier II West Midwest	–	PS	110	PA	207
2014	3	5	0	4th Midwest	–	PS	–	PA	90
2015	2	6	0	4th Midwest	–	PS	–	PA	206
2016	2	5	0	4th Midwest	–	PS	–	PA	193
2017	1	3	0	3rd Affiliate	–	PS	–	PA	169
2018	0	2	0	7th Central	–	PS	–	PA	38
Totals	20	61	0	–	–	TS	–	PA	2328
