= Wisconsin Dragons =

- Founded: 2010
- League: Women's Football Alliance
- Team history: Madison Dragons (planning stages); Wisconsin Dragons (2011-2019)
- Based in: Southeastern Wisconsin
- Stadium: Various
- Colors: Teal, orange, pewter
- Owner: Wisconsin Dragons, LLC
- Championships: 0
- Mascot: Scorch

The Wisconsin Dragons were a team of the Women's Football Alliance who played for the 2011, 2012, 2018 and 2019 seasons. The Dragons were based in southeastern Wisconsin and they played their home games at various stadiums in the Milwaukee area. The team was retired after the 2019 season, with a cumulative record of 9–19.
