= Zydeco Spice =

Women's American football team in Louisiana, US

- Founded: 2010
- League: Women's Football Alliance
- Team history: Acadiana Zydeco (2010–2020); Zydeco Spice (2021–present)
- Based in: Lafayette, Louisiana
- Stadium: Lafayette Christian Academy
- Colors
- President: Mia Ben
- Head coach: Jerome Milson
- Championships: 1
- Mascot: Inferneaux

The Zydeco Spice is a team in the Women's Football Alliance. The team began playing in the 2010 season as the Acadiana Zydeco and returned for the 2021 season under a new name. Based in the Acadiana region (and more specifically the Lafayette metropolitan area) of Louisiana, the Zydeco plays its home games at Lafayette Christian Academy in Lafayette. They are named after the Zydeco, a local Creole dance in Acadiana.

== Season-by-season ==
Season records
Season	W	L	T	Finish	Playoff results
2010	0	8	0	3rd American Southern	--
2011	1	7	0	3rd American Gulf	--
2012	4	4	0	2nd National Gulf Coast	--
2013	3	6	0	2nd American Gulf Coast	Lost American Conference Wild Card (St. Louis)
2014	3	5	0	2nd American Gulf Coast	--
2015	5	4	0	1st American Gulf Coast	Lost Midwest Regional Alliance Bowl (Houston)
2016	6	2	0	1st WFA3 American Midwest	Won WFA3 League Championship (Richmond)
2017	0	8	0	5th WFA3 American Midwest	--
2018	0	8	0	5th WFA3 American Midwest	--
2019	1	3	0	5th WFA3 American Midwest	--
2020	Season cancelled due to COVID-19 pandemic.				
2021	3	2	0	7th WFA3 American Midwest	--
Totals	26	57	0		
