= Louisiana Jazz =

- Founded: 2002
- League: Women's Football Alliance
- Team history: New Orleans Spice (2002–2003) (NWFA); New Orleans Blaze (2004–2011) (WFA); New Orleans Mojo (2012–2013) (WFA); Louisiana Jazz (2014) (WFA)
- Based in: Kenner, Louisiana
- Stadium: St. Martin's Episcopal School
- Colors: Purple, Black
- Owner: Darin Burns
- Head coach: Darin Burns

The Louisiana Jazz was a women's American football team in the Women's Football Alliance. They played their home games at St. Martin's Episcopal School.

== History ==
=== New Orleans Spice ===
The New Orleans Spice women's football team was established in 2002 and played through the 2003 season in the National Women's Football Association. The team played at Tad Gormley Stadium and Pan American Stadium.

=== New Orleans Blaze ===
From 2004 to 2011, the team competed as the New Orleans Blaze in both the National Women's Football Association and Women's Football Alliance. The team played at Tad Gormley Stadium and Pan American Stadium.
