= Kentucky Valkyries =

Women's football team

- Founded: 2007
- League: Women's Football Alliance
- Team history: WPFL (planning stages); WFA (2010-present)
- Based in: Bowling Green, Kentucky
- Stadium: TBD
- Colors: Green, gold, black
- President: Thomas O'Boyle
- Head coach: TBD
- Championships: 0

The Kentucky Valkyries were a team of the Women's Football Alliance that were scheduled to begin play for the 2010 season. Based in the city of Bowling Green, the Valkyries were likely to compete in the Mid-Atlantic Division against the Kentucky Karma, Columbus Comets, Cleveland Fusion, Pittsburgh Force, and Cincinnati Sizzle.

The Valkyries began as the Kentucky Force of the Women's Football League in 2006. They changed their identity to the Kentucky Knightmares in the off season but changed it again to the Valkyries prior to the 2007 season. They were originally planning to be a member of the Women's Professional Football League for its final season of 2007, but various complications led to them backing out before the season began.
