= Toledo Reign =

American women's football team

Thee Toledo Reign
- Founded: 2003
- League: Women's Football Alliance
- Team history: WPFL 2003-2007; WFA 2009-Present
- Based in: Toledo, Ohio
- Stadium: Waite High School (Toledo, Ohio) / Fremont Ross High School
- Colors: Purple, Silver, Black, Forest Green
- President: Beth Razzoog
- Head coach: Mitchi Collette
- Championships: 0

Thee Toledo Reign (known commonly as Toledo Reign) was a women's full-contact tackle football team in the Women's Football Alliance (WFA). Based in Toledo, Ohio, the team was established in 2003. The Reign originally played in the Women's Professional Football League. In 2009, the team became a founding member of the Women's Football Alliance. As of 2025, the Reign no longer plays in the WFA.

The Reign play in the spring and early summer, usually between April and July. The Reign has played home games at various stadiums in the northwest Ohio and southeast Michigan regions including Bedford Public Schools (Michigan) and Central Catholic High School (Toledo, Ohio). In the 2014 season the Reign played home games at both Waite High School (Toledo, Ohio) and Fremont Ross High School.

== Season-by-season ==
Season records
Season	W	L	T	Finish	Playoff results
Toledo Reign (WPFL)
2004	3	7	0	T-3rd National North	--
2005	6	4	0	T-3rd National	--
2006	4	4	0	2nd National North	--
2007	3	5	0	2nd National North	--
2008	Did not play				
Toledo Reign (WFA)
2009	1	7	0	4th National Central	--
2010	1	7	0	4th National North Central	--
2011	4	4	0	2nd National North Central 2	--
2012	3	5	0	1st National Division 5	Lost WFA First Round (Indy Crash)
2013	1	7	0	4th National Division 3	--
2014	6	2	0	1st National NE Region-Northeast	Lost WFA First Round (Columbus Comets)
Totals	32	52	0		

* = current standing

== 2009 ==
=== Season schedule ===
Date	Opponent	Home/Away	Result
April 25	West Michigan Mayhem	Home	Lost 0-47
May 2	Indiana Speed	Home	Lost 0-60
May 9	West Michigan Mayhem	Away	Lost 0-57
May 17	Fort Wayne Flash	Home	Lost 0-47
May 30	Dayton Diamonds	Home	Won 20-8
June 13	Fort Wayne Flash	Away	Lost 0-38
June 20	Indiana Speed	Away	Lost 0-58
June 27	Dayton Diamonds	Away	Lost 0-6

== 2010 ==
=== Season schedule ===
Date	Opponent	Home/Away	Result
April 10	Cleveland Fusion	Home	Lost 7-18
April 17	West Michigan Mayhem	Away	Lost 0-71
April 24	Detroit Dark Angels	Home	Lost 6-7
May 8	Dayton Diamonds	Away	Won 7-0
May 15	Cleveland Fusion	Away	Lost 0-62
May 22	West Michigan Mayhem	Home	Lost 0-64
June 12	Detroit Dark Angels	Away	Lost 0-20
June 19	Columbus Comets	Home	Lost 0-65

== 2011 ==
=== Standings ===
2011 North Central 2 Division
	W	L	T	PCT	PF	PA	DIV	GB	STK
y-Detroit Dark Angels	6	2	0	0.750	242	82	3-1	---	W4
Toledo Reign	4	4	0	0.500	209	161	3-1	2.0	L3
Dayton Diamonds	0	8	0	0.000	24	462	0-4	5.5	L8

=== Season schedule ===
Date	Opponent	Home/Away	Result
April 2	Dayton Diamonds	Away	Won 61-0
April 9	Kentucky Karma	Home	Won 23-0
April 16	West Michigan Mayhem	Away	Lost 12-54
April 30	Detroit Dark Angels	Home	Won 19-6
May 7	Dayton Diamonds	Home	Won 63-0
May 14	Indy Crash	Home	Lost 0-34
June 4	Detroit Dark Angels	Away	Lost 6-33
June 18	Cincinnati Sizzle	Away	Lost 25-34

== 2012 ==
=== Standings ===
2012 Division 5
	W	L	T	PCT	PF	PA	DIV	GB	STK
Toledo Reign-y	3	5	0	0.375	136	237	3-1	---	L1
Derby City Dynamite	4	4	0	0.500	128	100	3-1	---	W1
Cincinnati Sizzle	0	8	0	0.000	66	333	0-4	3	L8

=== Season schedule ===
Date	Opponent	Home/Away	Result
April 14	Cincinnati Sizzle	Home	Won 68-14
April 21	Detroit Dark Angels	Home	Lost 35-0
April 28	West Michigan Mayhem	Away	Lost 41-13
May 12	Pittsburgh Passion	Away	Lost 71-14
May 19	Derby City Dynamite	Away	Lost 20-18
June 2	Cincinnati Sizzle	Away	Won 14-6
June 9	Derby City Dynamite	Home	Won 32-22
June 16	Indy Crash	Home	Lost 28-7
June 23	Indy Crash	Away	Lost 52-35

== 2013 ==
=== Standings ===
2013 Division 3
	W	L	T	PCT	PF	PA	DIV	GB	STK
Cleveland Fusion-y	8	0	0	1.000	322	18	6-0	---	W8
Cincinnati Sizzle	4	4	0	0.500	186	264	3-3	3	W1
Derby City Dynamite	3	5	0	0.375	136	238	2-4	4	W3
Toledo Reign	1	7	0	0.125	65	278	1-5	5	L3

=== Season schedule ===
Date	Opponent	Home/Away	Result
April 6	Cincinnati Sizzle	Away	Lost 36-14
April 13	Pittsburgh Passion	Home	Lost 42-0
April 20	Cleveland Fusion	Home	Lost 36-6
May 4	Columbus Comets	Away	Lost 56-7
May 11	Derby City Dynamite	Home	Won 28-26
May 18	Cleveland Fusion	Away	Lost 50-0
June 1	Derby City Dynamite	Away	Lost 14-0
June 8	Cincinnati Sizzle	Home	Lost 20-12

== 2014 ==
=== Standings ===
2014 Mideast Division
	W	L	T	PCT	PF	PA	DIV	GB	STK
Toledo Reign-y	6	2	0	0.750	135	106	2-0	---	W2
Derby City Dynamite	4	5	0	0.444	242	186	1-1	1	W3
Cincinnati Sizzle	0	8	0	0.000	6	431	0-2	2	L8

=== Season schedule ===
Date	Opponent	Home/Away	Result
April 5	Derby City Dynamite	Away	Won 26-6
April 19	Central Maryland Seahawks	Away	Won 1-0 (Forfeit)
April 26	Cincinnati Sizzle	Home	Won 33-0
May 3	Pittsburgh Force	Home	Won 35-6
May 10	Columbus Comets	Away	Lost 48-0
May 17	Cleveland Fusion	Home	Lost 46-0
May 31	Pittsburgh Force	Away	Won 37-0
June 7	Central Maryland Seahawks	Home	Won 1-0 (Forfeit)
June 14	Columbus Comets	Away	Lost 22-0
