= Pittsburgh Force =

- Founded: 2008
- League: Women's Football Alliance
- Team history: NWFA (pre-2009 season); WFA (2009-2014)
- Based in: Munhall, Pennsylvania
- Stadium: William V. Campbell Athletic Field
- Colors: Black, Vegas Gold, White
- Owner: Kathy Ferrari
- Head coach: Kathy Ferrari
- Championships: 0

The Pittsburgh Force is an inactive women's American football team based in Pittsburgh, Pennsylvania. Home games were last played at William V. Campbell Athletic Field in nearby Munhall.

In the early planning stages, the Force was originally planning to play in the National Women's Football Association, but after the NWFA folded, they decided to join the upstart Women's Football Alliance.

== History ==
On March 10, 2008, the Pittsburgh Force was announced as an expansion team in the NWFA. Robert Gold was selected as the team's first head coach. They held tryouts in Ambridge, Cranberry, and Chartiers Valley for their inaugural 2009 season. From 2009 to 2011 they played their home games at Rubenstein Stadium in suburban Ambridge, Pennsylvania. In 2012, the Force moved their home field to William V. Campbell Athletic Field in suburban Munhall, Pennsylvania. In 2013, the Force went on a re-building hiatus. They returned for the 2014 season in the WFA.

Coaches W/L Records:

- Robert Gold (2009) 2-6
- Tim Schaup (2010) 1-2
- Jason Mignanelli (2010) 4-1
- Adam Santuro (2011) 1-5
- Kathy Ferrari (2011-2014) 6-10

== Season-by-season ==
Season records
Season	W	L	T	Finish	Playoff results
2009	2	6	0	4th National Mid-Atlantic	--
2010	5	3	0	2nd National Mid-Atlantic	--
2011	2	6	0	4th National Mid-Atlantic	--
2012	1	7	0	3rd National Division 4	--
2014	4	2	0	3rd Northeast Division	--
Total	14	24	0		

== Roster ==
2014 Pittsburgh Force roster
Quarterbacks: 12 Lisa Anantarow; 19 Cheronda Ransaw; Running backs: 5 Kayla Pauvlinch; 22 Nicole Lollo; 36 Kia Reddick; Wide receivers: 1 Tanya Jackson; 8 Miashonti Smith; 17 Brittney Rivers; Tight ends: 10 Sophronia Sallard; 72 Denise Williams; Offensive/Defensive Line: 7 Kelley Malovich; 13 Christina Englert; 16 Ashley Sopata; 27 Cynthia Zigler; 34 Kris Walsh; 39 Katrina Owens; 42 Brittany Whitlock; 52 Goldette Shields; 58 Sarah Courtney; 66 Justice Nixon; 67 Tiffany Hollibaugh; 73 Connie Howard; 87 Adrienne Honaker; 95 Deidra Peer; Linebackers: 24 LaToya Pitts; 28 Brittany Johnson; 30 Victoria Roberts; 44 Shelby Tinklepaugh; 45 Tonyarae Berry; 55 Kristina Howell; 86 Tatijana Lewis; Defensive backs: 11 Sheila Shields; 23 Siroya Mitchell	Injured reserve: None	Inactive: None; Coaches: Kathy Ferrari, Head Coach; Steve Sekelik, Offensive Coordinator; Everette Vereen, DL/ST Coach; Larry Fielder, RB/OL Coach; Dan Wagner, Asst. Coach	Management & Field staff: Kathy Ferrari, Owner; Craig McFeaters, CFO; Brigette Butler, General Mgr.; Michelle Longstreth, Website Mgr.; Kathy Oszewski, Game Day Operations; Sue Wilhelm, Concessions; Jenna Wilhelm, Concessions; Marijayne Peer, Event and Fundraiser Coordinator; Bonnie Caldwell, Merchandise Coordinator; Dr. Sam Akhavan Team Doctor (Allegheny Orthopedic); Vincent Morreale, Chiropractor; Jon Parsons, Team Photographer; Christina Englert, Program Designer

== 2009 ==
=== Season schedule ===
Date	Opponent	Home/Away	Result
April 18	Columbus Comets	Away	Lost 0-49
April 25	Cleveland Fusion	Away	Won 34-28
May 9	Cincinnati Sizzle	Home	Won 36-18
May 16	Columbus Comets	Home	Lost 0-38
May 23	Kentucky Karma	Home	Lost 6-8
May 30	Cleveland Fusion	Home	Lost 16-34
June 6	Cincinnati Sizzle	Away	Lost 8-14
June 20	Kentucky Karma	Away	Lost 20-46

== 2010 ==
=== Season schedule ===
Date	Opponent	Home/Away	Result
April 10	Dayton Diamonds	Home	Won 9-8
April 17	Columbus Comets	Home	Loss 0-68
April 24	Cleveland Fusion	Away	Loss 3-60
May 8	Columbus Comets	Away	Loss 0-58
May 22	Detroit Dark Angels	Home	Win 32-14
June 5	Dayton Diamonds	Away	Win 12-6 (2 OT)
June 12	Cincinnati Sizzle	Home	Win 48-0
June 19	Dayton Diamonds	Away	Win 13-0

== 2011 ==
=== Season schedule ===
Date	Opponent	Home/Away	Result
April 2	Pittsburgh Passion	Home	Lost 0-30
April 9	Columbus Comets	Away	Lost 0-55
April 16	Erie Illusion	Home	win by DQ
May 7	Cleveland Fusion	Home	Lost 0-54
May 14	Pittsburgh Passion	Away	Lost 0-45
June 4	Cleveland Fusion	Away	Lost 0-76
June 11	Erie Illusion	Away	Win by DQ
June 18	Columbus Comets	Home	Lost 0-64

Note: Erie was disqualified for the season and forfeited their wins against the Pittsburgh Force.

== 2012 ==
=== Season schedule ===
Date	Opponent	Home/Away	Result
April 14	Detroit Dark Angels	Home	Lost 6-35
April 21	Cleveland Fusion	Away	Lost 6-33
May 5	Derby City Dynamite	Away	Lost 2-8
May 12	Cleveland Fusion	Home	Lost 6-14
May 19	Pittsburgh Passion	Home	Lost 0-66
June 2	Detroit Dark Angels	Away	Lost 6-54
June 9	Cincinnati Sizzle	Away	Won 21-16
June 16	Keystone Assault	Home	Lost 15-50

== 2014 ==
=== Season schedule ===
Date	Opponent	Home/Away	Result
April 5	Baltimore Burn	Home	Won 30-8
April 12	Central Maryland Seahawks	Away	Won by Forfeit
May 3	Toledo Reign	Away	Lost 6-35
May 10	Central Maryland Seahawks	Home	Won by Forfeit
May 24	Cincinnati Sizzle	Away	Won 26-0
May 31	Toledo Reign	Home	Lost 0-37
