= Dayton Diamonds =

- Founded: 2008
- League: Women's Football Alliance
- Team history: NWFA (2008); WFA (2009-present)
- Based in: Clayton, Ohio
- Stadium: Northmont High School
- Colors: Black, turquoise
- President: Tanya Jackson
- Head coach: Todd Edwards
- Championships: 0

The Dayton Diamonds are a charter member of the Women's Football Alliance which began play in 2008. Based in Dayton, Ohio, home games are played on the campus of Northmont High School in nearby Clayton.

In their inaugural season, the Diamonds competed in the National Women's Football Association.

The Diamonds have partnered with The Miami County Post, a news and information website based in Troy, Ohio to rebroadcast home and road games on a taped delay.

The Diamonds remained dormant for 4 seasons and the team's fate was uncertain throughout that period. However, it was announced that they would return for the 2016 WFA season.

== Season-by-season ==
Season records
Season	W	L	T	Finish	Playoff results
Dayton Diamonds (NWFA)
2008	1	7	0	3rd Northern Midwest	--
Dayton Diamonds (WFA)
2009	1	7	0	5th National Central	--
2010	0	8	0	3rd National Mid Atlantic	--
2011	0	8	0	3rd National North Central	--
Totals	2	30	0		

== 2008 ==
=== Season schedule ===
Date	Opponent	Home/Away	Result
April 19	Fort Wayne Flash	Home	Lost 0-59
May 3	West Michigan Mayhem	Away	Lost 0-82
May 10	Cincinnati Sizzle	Away	Lost 6-54
May 17	Indianapolis Chaos	Home	Won 14–8
May 24	Fort Wayne Flash	Away	Lost 0-62
June 7	Cincinnati Sizzle	Home	Lost 0-61
June 14	West Michigan Mayhem	Home	Lost 0-68
June 21	Indianapolis Chaos	Away	Lost 6–12

== 2009 ==
=== Season schedule ===
Date	Opponent	Home/Away	Result
April 18	Indiana Speed	Away	Lost 8-62
May 2	West Michigan Mayhem	Home	Lost 0-56
May 9	Fort Wayne Flash	Home	Lost 0-29
May 30	Toledo Reign	Away	Lost 8-20
June 6	Indiana Speed	Home	Lost 0-56
June 13	West Michigan Mayhem	Away	Lost 0-55
June 20	Fort Wayne Flash	Away	Lost 20–68
June 27	Toledo Reign	Home	Won 6–0

== 2010 ==
=== Season schedule ===
Date	Opponent	Home/Away	Result
April 10	Pittsburgh Force	Away	Lost 8–9
April 24	Columbus Comets	Away	Lost 0-43
May 8	Toledo Reign	Home	Lost 0–7
May 15	Detroit Dark Angels	Away	Lost 0-54
May 22	Indiana Speed	Away	Lost 0-45
June 5	Pittsburgh Force	Home	Lost 6–12
June 12	Columbus Comets	Home	Lost 0-48
June 19	Pittsburgh Force	Home	Lost 0–13

== 2011 ==
=== Standings ===
2011 North Central 2 Division
	W	L	T	PCT	PF	PA	DIV	GB	STK
y-Detroit Dark Angels	6	2	0	0.750	242	82	3-1	---	W4
Toledo Reign	4	4	0	0.500	209	161	3-1	2.0	L3
Dayton Diamonds	0	8	0	0.000	24	462	0-4	5.5	L8

=== Season schedule ===
Date	Opponent	Home/Away	Result
April 2	Toledo Reign	Home	Lost 0-61
April 16	St. Louis Slam	Away	Lost 0-70
April 30	Cincinnati Sizzle	Home	Lost 12–51
May 7	Toledo Reign	Away	Lost 0-63
May 14	Detroit Dark Angels	Away	Lost 0-69
May 21	West Michigan Mayhem	Home	Lost 0-63
June 4	Kentucky Karma	Away	Lost 12–28
June 11	Detroit Dark Angels	Home	Lost 0-57
