= Indiana Speed =

- Founded: 2002
- League: Women's Football Alliance
- Team history: WPFL 2002–2007; WFA 2009–2010
- Based in: Indianapolis, Indiana
- Arena: Park Tudor School
- Colors: Blue, Orange
- Owners: 2002 - 2004: Charleen Daniels and Kim Wright. 2005 - 2010: Sandi Ballard and April Priest
- Head coach: Sam "Woody" Wood
- Championships: 0

The Indiana Speed was a football team that played in the National Conference of the Women's Professional Football League, and later in the National Conference of the Women's Football Alliance.

== Season results ==
Season records
Season	W	L	T	Finish	Playoff results
Indiana Speed (WPFL)
2002	3	5	0	3rd National	–
2003	6	4	0	2nd American North	–
2004	3	7	0	4th National North	–
2005	7	3	0	2nd National	Lost National Conference Qualifier (Minnesota)
2006	7	1	0	1st National North	Lost National Conference Qualifier (Wisconsin)
2007	4	4	0	1st National North	Lost National Conference Qualifier (Wisconsin)
2008	Did not play				
Indiana Speed (WFA)
2009	6	2	0	2nd National Central	Lost National Conference Semifinal (Philadelphia)
2010	5	3	0	2nd National Central	–
Totals	41	33	0	(including playoffs)	

== Season schedules ==
=== 2009 ===
Date	Opponent	Home/Away	Result
April 18	Dayton Diamonds	Home	Won 62–8
April 25	Fort Wayne Flash	Away	Won 52–0
May 2	Toledo Reign	Away	Won 60–0
May 16	West Michigan Mayhem	Home	Lost 15–20
May 30	Fort Wayne Flash	Home	Won 14–7
June 6	Dayton Diamonds	Away	Won 56–0
June 20	Toledo Reign	Home	Won 57–0
June 27	West Michigan Mayhem	Away	Lost 0–21
July 11	Philadelphia Liberty Belles (National Conference Semifinal)	Away	Lost 9–19

=== 2010 ===
Date	Opponent	Home/Away	Result
April 10	Kentucky Karma	Home	Won 41–0
April 17	Cincinnati Sizzle	Away	Won 40–0
April 24	St. Louis Slam	Home	Lost 6–13
May 1	West Michigan Mayhem	Away	Lost 13–45
May 8	Kentucky Karma	Away	Won 54–6
May 22	Dayton Diamonds	Home	Won 54–0
June 5	Cincinnati Sizzle	Home	Won 62–0
June 19	St. Louis Slam	Away	Lost 13–16
