= Boston Renegades (WFA) =

Women's american football team

- Founded: 2015
- League: WFA (2015–2025)
- Team history: Boston Renegades (2015–2025); Boston Militia (2008–2014); Bay State Warriors/Boston Rampage (2002–2007); Massachusetts Mutiny (2001–2007)
- Based in: Revere, Massachusetts
- Stadium: Harry Della Russo Stadium
- Colors: red, black, white
- Owner: Molly Goodwin
- Head coach: John Johnson
- General manager: Ben Brown
- Championships: 5 (2018, 2019, 2021, 2022, 2023)
- Conference titles: 7 (2017, 2018, 2019, 2021, 2022, 2023, 2024)
- Division titles: 7 (2015, 2017, 2018, 2019, 2021, 2022, 2023)
- Website: bostonrenegadesfootball.org

The Boston Renegades are an inactive tackle football team in the Women's Football Alliance.

== Formation ==
On January 5, 2015, three-time national women's tackle football champions the Boston Militia announced they were discontinuing operations. To ensure that women's football would continue in Boston, three former players secured a transfer of ownership of the team from Militia president Ernie Boch, Jr. Molly Goodwin, Mia Brickhouse, and Erin Baumgartner incorporated as Boston Women's Football, LLC, and reorganized the team under the name Boston Renegades.

== Season-by-season ==
Season records
Season	W	L	T	Finish	Playoff results
Boston Renegades (WFA)
2015	3	2	0	1st New England Division	Won National Conference Quarterfinal (West Michigan); Lost National Conference Semifinal (Chicago)
2016	5	3	0	3rd National Conference (Tier 1)	Won National Conference Quarterfinal (Cleveland); Won National Conference Semifinal (Chicago); Lost National Conference Final (D.C.)
2017	7	0	0	1st National Conference (Tier 1)	Won National Conference Semifinal (D.C.); Won National Conference Final (Chicago); Lost WFA National Championship (Dallas)
2018	6	2	0	3rd National Conference (Tier 1)	Won National Conference Semifinal (Pittsburgh); Won National Conference Final (D.C.); Won WFA National Championship (Los Angeles)
2019	8	0	0	1st National Conference (Tier 1)	Won National Conference Final (D.C.); Won WFA National Championship (Los Angeles)
2020	0	0	0		Season cancelled due to global pandemic.
2021	5	0	0	1st National Conference (Tier 1)	Won National Conference Final (Tampa Bay); Won WFA National Championship (Minnesota)
2022	6	0	0	1st National Conference (Tier 1)	Won National Conference Semifinal (D.C.); Won National Conference Final (Pittsburgh); Won WFA National Championship (Minnesota)
2023	6	0	0	1st National Conference (Tier 1)	Won National Conference Semifinal (D.C.); Won National Conference Final (Alabama); Won WFA National Championship (St. Louis)
Totals	64	10	0	(including playoffs)	

== 2015 ==
=== Recap ===
The new Renegades organization turned to former Boston Militia assistant coach Don Williams to lead the team as head coach in its inaugural season. Former Militia assistant coaches Michael Muccio and Brie-El Parker stepped into the coordinator positions, and the coaching staff was rounded out with both experienced and new coaches. Notably, former players Molly Goodwin and Jennifer "Coco" Edwards joined the defensive staff as rookie coaches. During the course of the season, the team added former New England Intensity Head Coach Johnny Johnson and former New England Patriots player Patrick Pass as assistant coaches.

Geographically isolated from other teams in the Northeast Region of the Women's Football Alliance (WFA), the Renegades were alone in the New England Division, and played only five scheduled regular season games instead of the customary eight. A sixth game, an interleague match with Independent Women's Football League (IWFL) team the Montreal Blitz, had been cancelled.

The Boston Renegades opened their inaugural season on April 18, 2015, with a home win against the Central Maryland Seahawks 57–0. The Renegades finished with a 3–2 regular-season record. In the WFA National Conference quarterfinals, Boston defeated the West Michigan Mayhem 59–12 at Dilboy Stadium. Then the Renegades hosted a Conference semifinal game against the Chicago Force, but lost 49–18.

=== Standings ===
2015 WFA New England Division
	W	L	T	PCT	PF	PA	DIV	GB	STK
y,z - Boston Renegades	3	2	0	.600	166	132	0-0	---	L1

y - clinched division title
z - clinched playoff berth

=== Games ===
Date	Opponent	Home/Away	Result
April 18	Central Maryland Seahawks	Home	Won 36–32
May 2	D.C. Divas	Home	Lost 32–27
May 16	Cleveland Fusion	Away	Won 24–20
May 30	Chicago Force	Away	Won 30–24
June 13	D.C. Divas	Away	Lost 56–28
June 27	West Michigan Mayhem (National Conference Quarterfinal)	Home	Won 59–12
July 11	Chicago Force (National Conference Semifinal)	Home	Lost 49–18

== 2016 ==
=== Recap ===
Following a season as an assistant coach, John Johnson was appointed head coach of the Renegades. Patrick Pass stepped into the defensive coordinator and defensive backs coach positions. Former Boston Militia coach Vernon Crawford returned after a season away to serve as offensive coordinator and assistant head coach. 2015 kicking coach Cliff Ashley was promoted to Special Teams Coordinator. The Renegades added several new coaches, including former Massachusetts Mutiny and Boston Militia player Susan Burtoft.

The Renegades were assigned to the Colonial Division along with the D.C. Divas, Keystone Assault, Philadelphia Phantomz, and Richmond Black Widows. But the deployment this season of a tiered playoff system with seeding determined solely by Massey Ratings made geographical assignments as such irrelevant. More meaningful was Boston's inclusion in the top tier of the league, known as Division I or WFA1, where they would compete with D.C., the Chicago Force, Pittsburgh Passion, Atlanta Phoenix, and Cleveland Fusion on the conference level. The proximity of the Philadelphia Phantomz, however, enabled the Renegades to play a customary eight-game schedule by adding home and away dates with the new Division II team.

With a 51–32 victory over Pittsburgh on May 17, Renegades quarterback Allison Cahill reached a new milestone in sports by becoming the first quarterback to attain 100 victories playing exclusively in women's football leagues.

The Renegades finished with a 5–3 regular-season record, and claimed the third seed in the WFA National Conference playoff bracket. In the conference quarterfinals, Boston defeated the Cleveland Fusion 19–13 at Dilboy Stadium. The Renegades traveled for their conference semifinal match, upsetting the Chicago Force 17–13. Boston was unable to overcome the D.C. Divas in the conference final.

=== Standings ===
2016 WFA Division 1 — National Conference (Regular Season)
CR	NR		W	L	T	PCT	PF	PA	SOS	STK
1	2	x,y - D.C. Divas	7	1	0	.875	366	150	1	W7
2	3	x,y - Chicago Force	7	1	0	.875	432	106	3	W3
3	5	x - Boston Renegades	5	3	0	.625	273	242	2	L2
4	6	x,y - Pittsburgh Passion	6	2	0	.750	358	122	8	L1
5	13	x,y - Atlanta Phoenix	5	3	0	.625	296	136	15	W1
6	16	x - Cleveland Fusion	4	4	0	.500	181	149	11	W3

x - clinched playoff berth
y - clinched division title

=== Games ===
Date	Opponent	Home/Away	Result
April 2	Philadelphia Phantomz	Away	Won 40–25
April 9	Cleveland Fusion	Away	Won 28–7
April 16	D.C. Divas	Home	Lost 35–32
April 30	Philadelphia Phantomz	Home	Won 54–12
May 7	Cleveland Fusion	Home	Won 47–18
May 14	Pittsburgh Passion	Away	Won 51–32
May 21	Chicago Force	Home	Lost 58–14
June 4	D.C. Divas	Away	Lost 55–7
June 11	Cleveland Fusion (National Conference Quarterfinal)	Home	Won 19–13
June 25	Chicago Force (National Conference Semifinal)	Away	Won 17–13
July 9	D.C. Divas (National Conference Final)	Away	Lost 47–21

== 2017 ==
=== Recap ===
John Johnson continued to lead the Renegades as head coach while also taking over defensive coordinator responsibilities. Vernon Crawford and Cliff Ashley continued in their established roles as offensive coordinator and special teams coordinator, respectively. The Renegades changed their venue to James R. O'Connor Stadium at Catholic Memorial School in Boston.

Boston continued to compete in the highest tier of the league, WFA1. Like 2016, the Renegades were assigned to the nominal "Colonial Division" in the Northeast Region of the National Conference. An influx of new teams to the region added new competition in Boston's schedule from the Montreal Blitz who joined the WFA from the IWFL.

Four players — Steph Jeffers, Vicky Eddy, Adrienne Smith, and Rese Woodfine — were named to the U.S. Women's National Football Team. Jeffers and Eddy, along with former player Emily Weinberg, played in the 2017 IFAF Women's World Championship tournament in Canada, and won the gold medal.

The Renegades finished the regular season undefeated with a 7–0 record, and claimed the top seed in the WFA National Conference playoff bracket, securing home field advantage. Following a bye in the quarterfinals, Boston defeated the D.C. Divas 27–24 in the conference semifinal. The Renegades then defeated the visiting Chicago Force 47–33 in the conference title game. The final score of the 2017 WFA National Championship, named The W Bowl II, was Dallas Elite 31, Boston Renegades 21.

=== Standings ===
2017 WFA Division 1 — National Conference (Regular Season)
CR	NR		W	L	T	PCT	PF	PA	SOS	STK
1	1	^{x,y} Boston Renegades	7	0	0	1.000	232	123	1	W7
2	2	^{x,y} Chicago Force	7	1	0	.875	285	66	4	W1
3	3	^{x,y} Pittsburgh Passion	6	2	0	.750	320	145	3	W1
4	4	^{x} D.C. Divas	5	3	0	.625	202	162	2	W3
5	7	^{x} Cleveland Fusion	5	3	0	.625	205	105	7	W1
6	12	^{x} Atlanta Phoenix	6	2	0	.750	352	127	22	L1

x - clinched playoff berth
y - clinched division title

=== Games ===
Date	Opponent	Home/Away	Result
April 8	Philadelphia Phantomz	Away	Won 41–6
April 22	D.C. Divas	Away	Won 26–22
April 29	Montreal Blitz	Home	Won 54–19
May 6	D.C. Divas	Home	Won 26–0
May 13	Pittsburgh Passion	Home	Won 33–28
May 20	Chicago Force	Away	Won 25–24
June 3	Philadelphia Phantomz	Home	Won 27–24
June 17	D.C. Divas (National Conference Semifinal)	Home	Won 27–24
July 8	Chicago Force (National Conference Final)	Home	Won 47–33
July 22	Dallas Elite (WFA National Championship)	Neutral (Pittsburgh, Pa.)	Lost 31–21

== 2018 ==
=== Recap ===
John Johnson continued to lead the Renegades as head coach and defensive coordinator. Vernon Crawford and Cliff Ashley also continued in their established roles respectively as assistant head coach/offensive coordinator and special teams coordinator. The Renegades changed their venue to Harry Della Russo Stadium in Revere, Massachusetts.

Boston continued to compete in the highest tier of the league, WFA1. The Renegades competed in the Northeast Region of the National Conference with the D.C. Divas and the Pittsburgh Passion. The 2018 schedule included the Philadelphia Phantomz, the New York Sharks and the Baltimore Nighthawks. Boston had not faced the Sharks since 2013 or the Nighthawks since 2009.

The Renegades finished the regular season with a 6–2 record, and claimed the #3 seed in the WFA National Conference playoff bracket. Boston upset the #2 ranked Pittsburgh Passion 63–26 in the conference semifinal, and the #1 ranked D.C. Divas 34–32 in the conference title game. Boston defeated the Los Angeles Warriors in the league championship game 42–18 at Fifth Third Bank Stadium, Kennesaw State University in Kennesaw, Georgia. The Renegades became the first team since 2006 (Atlanta Xplosion, IWFL) to capture a Division I national title by winning three consecutive games away from home. They also became the first team since 2007 (So Cal Scorpions, WPFL) to win a Division I national title despite having two losses on their season record.

=== Standings ===
2018 WFA Division 1 — National Conference (Regular Season)
CR	NR		W	L	T	PCT	PF	PA	SOS	STK
1	1	^{x,y} D.C. Divas	6	2	0	.750	272	119	2	W5
2	2	^{x} Pittsburgh Passion	7	1	0	.875	321	111	3	W1
3	3	^{x} Boston Renegades	6	2	0	.750	239	110	1	W2
4	7	^{x} Atlanta Phoenix	6	1	0	.857	162	26	6	W5

x - clinched playoff berth
y - clinched division title

=== Games ===
Date	Opponent	Home/Away	Result
April 7	Philadelphia Phantomz	Away	Won 21–12
April 14	D.C. Divas	Home	Won 21–14
April 21	Pittsburgh Passion	Away	Lost 41–44
April 28	Cleveland Fusion	Home	Won by forfeit
May 12	New York Sharks	Away	Won 21–0
May 19	D.C. Divas	Away	Lost 35–40
June 2	Baltimore Nighthawks	Home	Won 42–0
June 9	Philadelphia Phantomz	Home	Won 56–0
June 30	Pittsburgh Passion (National Conference Semifinal)	Away	Won 63–26
July 14	D.C. Divas (National Conference Final)	Away	Won 34–32
July 28	Los Angeles Warriors (WFA National Championship)	Neutral (Atlanta, Ga.)	Won 42–18

== 2019 ==
=== Recap ===
John Johnson, Vernon Crawford, and Cliff Ashley continued in their established roles respectively as head coach/defensive coordinator, assistant head coach/offensive coordinator, and special teams coordinator.

Boston continued to compete in the highest tier of the league, WFA1. The Renegades competed in the Northeast Region of the National Conference with the D.C. Divas, and the 2019 schedule included the Baltimore Nighthawks, Philadelphia Phantomz, New York Wolves, and the Tampa Bay Inferno.

The Renegades finished the regular season with a 8–0 record, claiming the #1 seed in the WFA National Conference playoff bracket. Boston drubbed their rival the D.C. Divas 66–20 in the conference title game, then went on to defeat the Cali War, capturing their second consecutive national title. The National Championship game was held on July 13 at the Colorado School of Mines in Golden, Colorado.

=== Standings ===
2019 WFA Division 1 — National Conference (Regular Season)
CR	NR		W	L	T	PCT	PF	PA	SOS	STK
1	1	^{x,y} Boston Renegades	8	0	0	1.000	490	104	2	W8
2	3	^{x} D.C. Divas	6	2	0	.750	395	216	1	L1

x - clinched playoff berth
y - clinched division title

=== Games ===
Date	Opponent	Home/Away	Result
April 6	Tampa Bay Inferno	Away	Won 61–7
April 13	New York Wolves	Home	Won 68–14
April 27	D.C. Divas	Away	Won 37–32
May 4	New York Wolves	Away	Won 40–13
May 18	Baltimore Nighthawks	Home	Won 68–0
June 1	Philadelphia Phantomz	Home	Won 91–0
June 8	Baltimore Nighthawks	Away	Won 63–6
June 15	D.C. Divas	Home	Won 62–32
June 29	D.C. Divas (National Conference Final)	Home	Won 66–20
July 13	Cali War (WFA National Championship)	Neutral (Golden, Co.)	Won 52–24

== 2020 ==
=== Recap ===
The 2020 season of the Women's Football Alliance was cancelled in its entirety due to health and safety concerns in regards to the COVID-19 (Coronavirus) pandemic. Although regular season games were scheduled, none were played. The Renegades were able to participate in a preseason practice and scrimmage with the Baltimore Nighthawks before social distancing practices were adopted nationally to combat the spread of COVID-19.

On July 1, a film documenting the 2018 season of the Boston Renegades, "Born To Play" was aired nationally on ESPN. It was aired internationally on ABC Network on July 18. The film, directed by Viridiana Lieberman and produced by Park Pictures, received widespread critical acclaim.

=== Games ===
Date	Opponent	Home/Away	Result
April 11	New York Wolves	Away	Not played
April 18	D.C. Divas	Away	Not played
April 25	Minnesota Vixen	Home	Not played
May 2	Detroit Dark Angels	Home	Not played
May 9	Cleveland Fusion	Away	Not played
May 16	D.C. Divas	Home	Not played
May 30	St. Louis Slam	Away	Not played
June 6	New York Wolves	Home	Not played

== 2021 ==
=== Recap ===
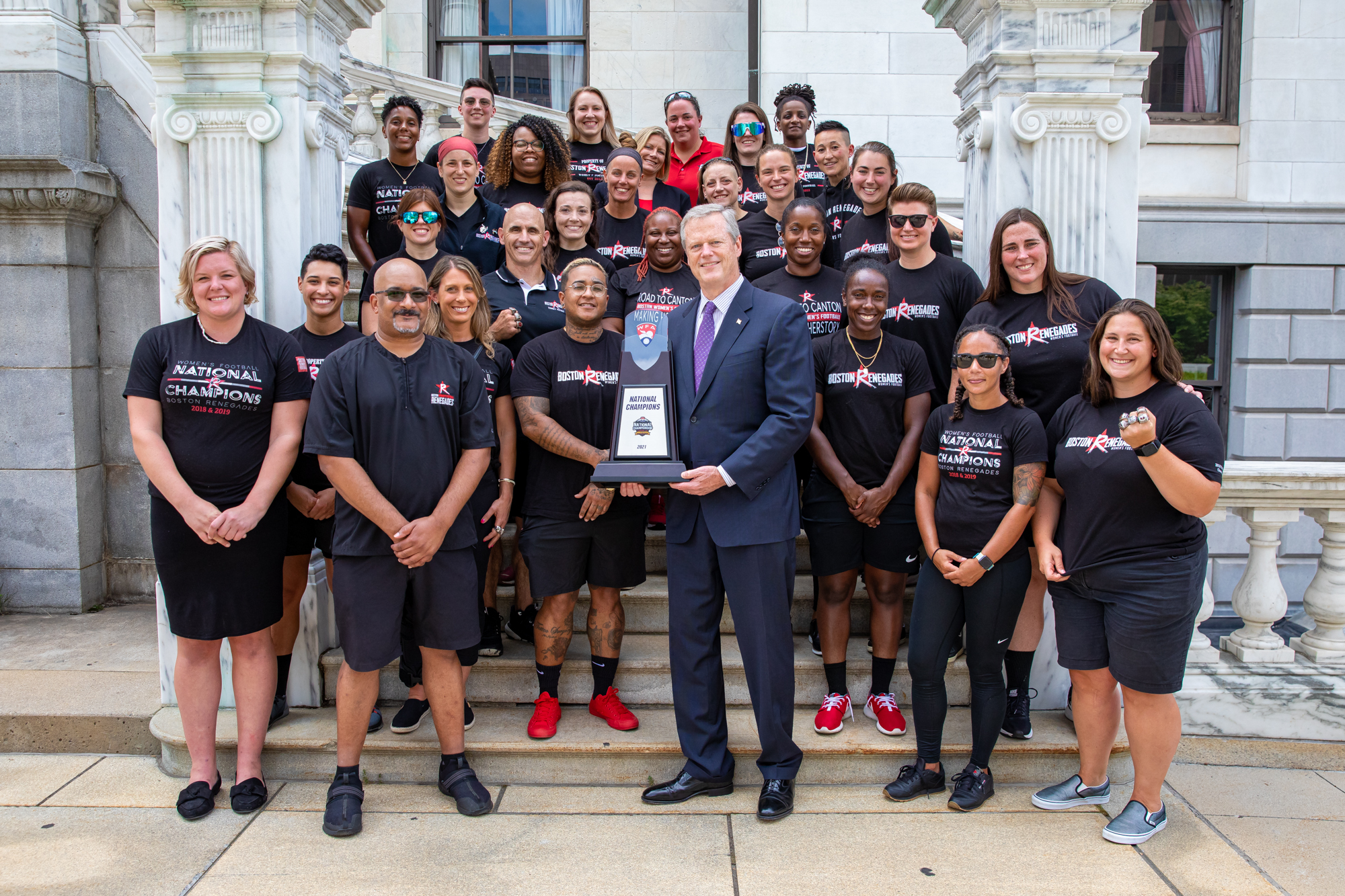
Renegades celebrate their champion season with Massachusetts Governor Charlie Baker

After the 2020 season was cancelled due to a global pandemic, the Women's Football Alliance returned to play in 2021 with a shortened season. The Renegades played a five-game regular season instead of the customary eight. Boston finished the regular season undefeated. They defeated the Tampa Bay Inferno in the conference championship and then won the national championship game 42–26 over the Minnesota Vixen. By doing so, the Renegades became the first team in WFA history to complete a "threepeat," which is winning a championship three years in a row. Quarterback Allison Cahill was named the game's Most Valuable Player. Cahill's autographed game jersey and a game ball signed by the team were curated by the Pro Football Hall of Fame.

Cahill was also named the National Conference Most Valuable Player of the Year for the fourth time in her career. She became the first Quarterback lead a women's tackle football team to 6 national titles (2010, 2011, 2014, 2018, 2019, 2021), surpassing the mark of five set by Kim Grodus of the Detroit Demolition (2002, 2003, 2004, 2005, 2007). Defensive End Danielle Fournier was named National Conference Defensive Player of the Year.

The Renegades were surprised by NFL team owner Robert Kraft who offered to have the team flown to the WFA National Championship Game aboard the New England Patriots team plane. The event went viral on social media, providing exposure and publicity to the team and the sport of women's tackle football.

"Born To Play," a film documenting the 2018 season of the Boston Renegades, was made widely available through video-on-demand platforms including Hulu, Apple TV, VUDU, and Netflix.

=== Standings ===
2021 WFA Division 1 — National Conference (Regular Season)
CR	NR		W	L	T	PCT	PF	PA	SOS	STK
1	1	^{x} Boston Renegades	5	0	0	1.000	291	9	2	W5
2	2	^{x} D.C. Divas	1	3	0	.250	57	140	1	L3
3	4	^{x} Tampa Bay Inferno	6	0	0	1.000	237	20	21	W6
2021 WFA Division 1 — American Conference (Regular Season)
1	3	^{x} Minnesota Vixen	6	0	0	1.000	162	26	29	W6
2	7	^{x} Cali War	6	1	0	.857	202	48	17	W2
3	10	^{x} Arlington Impact	4	2	0	.666	130	82	11	L2
4	22	^{x} Dallas Elite	3	3	0	.500	96	149	23	L1

x - clinched playoff berth

=== Games ===
Date	Opponent	Home/Away	Result
May 8	Detroit Dark Angels	Home	Won 62–0
May 15	D.C. Divas	Home	Won 56–6
May 22	Baltimore Nighthawks	Home	Won 62–0
June 5	D.C. Divas	Away	Won 70–0
June 19	Detroit Dark Angels	Away	Won 41–3
July 10	Tampa Bay Inferno (National Conference Final)	Home	Won 63–3
July 24	Minnesota Vixen (WFA National Championship)	Neutral (Canton, Ohio)	Won 42–26

== 2022 ==
=== Recap ===
The Renegades played a six-game regular season, finishing the regular season undefeated. Over the course of the regular season, Boston celebrated its milestone 50th franchise victory and wide receiver Adrienne Smith became the WFA's all-time receiving yards leader. Quarterback Allison Cahill was named the WFA National Conference Most Valuable Player for the 2022 season.

In the postseason, Boston defeated the D.C. Divas in the National Conference semifinal, the Pittsburgh Passion in the National Conference championship, and then won the national championship game 32–12 over the Minnesota Vixen. By doing so, the Renegades became the first team in WFA history to complete a "fourpeat," winning a championship an unprecedented four years in a row. Chanté Bonds was named the MVP of the championship game which was televised on ESPN2.

=== Standings ===
2022 WFA Pro — National Conference (Regular Season)
CR	NR		W	L	T	PCT	PF	PA	SOS	STK
1	1	^{x} Boston Renegades	6	0	0	1.000	320	85	6	W6
2	5	^{x} Tampa Bay Inferno	5	1	0	.833	234	67	16	W4
3	8	^{x} Pittsburgh Passion	4	2	0	.666	160	100	5	W1
4	11	^{x} D.C. Divas	2	4	0	.333	177	198	1	L1
5	12	Detroit Venom	4	2	0	.666	113	127	4	W3
2022 WFA Pro — American Conference (Regular Season)
1	2	^{x} Minnesota Vixen	4	2	0	.666	231	86	9	W1
2	3	^{x} Arlington Impact	5	1	0	.833	192	103	8	W2
3	4	^{x} Cali War	5	1	0	.833	190	120	7	W1
4	6	^{x} Nevada Storm	4	2	0	.666	179	114	2	W1
5	7	St. Louis Slam	4	2	0	.666	161	132	3	W1
6	25	Dallas Elite	2	4	0	.333	100	153	12	W1

x - clinched playoff berth

=== Games ===
Date	Opponent	Home/Away	Result
April 16	D.C. Divas	Away	Won 69–28
April 23	Tampa Bay Inferno	Away	Won 47–0
April 30	Detroit Venom	Home	Won 49–0
May 7	Pittsburgh Passion	Home	Won 46–8
May 14	St. Louis Slam	Away	Won 49–21
May 21	D.C. Divas	Home	Won 60–28
June 11	D.C. Divas (National Conference Semifinal)	Home	Won 69–32
June 25	Pittsburgh Passion (National Conference Final)	Home	Won 42–24
July 10	Minnesota Vixen (WFA National Championship)	Neutral (Canton, Ohio)	Won 32–12

== 2023 ==
=== Recap ===
The Renegades played a six-game regular season, once again finishing undefeated.

In the postseason, Boston defeated the D.C. Divas in the National Conference semifinal, the Alabama Fire in the National Conference championship, and then won the national championship game 35–7 over the St. Louis Slam, with DL Whitney Zelee earning MVP honors. With this victory, the Renegades became the first team in WFA history to complete a "fivepeat," winning a championship an unprecedented five consecutive seasons.

=== Games ===
Date	Opponent	Home/Away	Result
April 29	D.C. Divas	Home	Won 63–6
May 6	Detroit Venom	Away	Won 56–0
May 13	Pittsburgh Passion	Home	Won 61–0
May 20	D.C. Divas	Away	Won 84–25
June 3	Tampa Bay Inferno	Home	Won 69–0
June 10	Pittsburgh Passion	Away	Won 32–12
June 24	D.C. Divas (National Conference Semifinal)	Home	Won 70–14
July 8	Alabama Fire (National Conference Final)	Home	Won 58–6
July 22	St. Louis Slam (WFA National Championship)	Neutral (Canton, Ohio)	Won 35–7
