= Kentucky Karma =

Women's Football Alliance team

- Founded: 2005
- Folded: 2011
- League: Women's Football Alliance
- Team history: NWFA (2005–2008); WFA (2009–2011)
- Based in: Crestwood, Kentucky
- Stadium: South Oldham High School
- Colors: Sky blue, purple, white
- Owner: Thomas Hawkins, Sr. & Mary Hawkins
- Head coach: Thomas Hawkins, Sr.
- Championships: 0

The Kentucky Karma was a team in the Women's Football Alliance. Based in Louisville, the Karma played their home games at South Oldham High School in Crestwood, Kentucky, approximately 20 miles northeast of Louisville. From 2005 to 2008, the Karma played in the National Women's Football Association. In 2009, they changed leagues and played in the Women's Football Alliance for 2 years, and subsequently folded in 2011.

== Season-by-season ==
Season records
Season	W	L	T	Finish	Playoff results
Kentucky Karma (NWFA)
2005	5	3	0	8th North	–
2006	5	3	0	2nd South Central	Lost NWFA First Round (St. Louis)
2007	4	4	0	3rd South North	–
2008	6	2	0	1st South East	Won Southern Conference Quarterfinal (Pensacola); Forfeited Southern Conference Semifinal (Los Angeles)
Kentucky Karma (WFA)
2009	5	3	0	2nd National Mid-Atlantic	–
2010	2	6	0	3rd National Central	–
2011	1	7	0	3rd National North Central 1	–
Totals	29	30	0	(including playoffs)	

== 2009 ==
=== Season schedule ===
Date	Opponent	Home/Away	Result
April 18	Cleveland Fusion	Away	Lost 14–38
April 25	Cincinnati Sizzle	Home	Won 22–14
May 16	Cleveland Fusion	Home	Won 20–12
May 23	Pittsburgh Force	Away	Won 8–6
May 30	Cincinnati Sizzle	Away	Won 22–0
June 13	Columbus Comets	Away	Lost 8–23
June 20	Pittsburgh Force	Home	Won 46–20
June 27	Columbus Comets	Home	Lost 12–21

== 2010 ==
=== Season schedule ===
Date	Opponent	Home/Away	Result
April 10	Indiana Speed	Away	Lost 0–41
April 17	Cleveland Fusion	Home	Lost 6–54
April 24	Cincinnati Sizzle	Home	Won 6–0
May 1	St. Louis Slam	Away	Lost 0–50
May 8	Indiana Speed	Home	Lost 6–54
May 22	St. Louis Slam	Home	Lost 6–70
June 5	Columbus Comets	Away	Lost 0–66
June 19	Cincinnati Sizzle	Away	Won 20–14

== 2011 ==
=== Standings ===
2011 North Central 1 Division
	W	L	T	PCT	PF	PA	DIV	GB	STK
y-Indy Crash	6	2	0	0.750	321	147	4-0	---	L1
Cincinnati Sizzle	4	4	0	0.500	222	169	2-2	2.0	W2
Kentucky Karma	1	7	0	0.125	34	318	0-4	5.0	L2

=== Season schedule ===
Date	Opponent	Home/Away	Result
April 2	Detroit Dark Angels	Away	Lost 0–14
April 9	Toledo Reign	Away	Lost 0–23
April 30	Indy Crash	Away	Lost 0–77
May 14	Cincinnati Sizzle	Home	Lost 0–42
May 21	Indy Crash	Home	Lost 0–77
June 4	Dayton Diamonds	Home	Won 28–12
June 11	Cincinnati Sizzle	Away	Lost 6–67
June 18	St. Louis Slam	Home	Lost 0–6**

** = Forfeited
