= Fusing =

Fusing, as a joining process, may refer to:

- Fusing (manufacturing), type of manufacturing process for joining or terminating electrical magnet wire
- Stained glass fusing, technique used to join glass pieces together

Fusing as a place may refer to:

- Fusing, Changhua, Taiwan
- Fuxing District, Handan, district of Handan, Hebei, China
- Fuxing District, Taoyuan, Taoyuan City, Taiwan

== See also ==
- Fuse (disambiguation)
- Fusion (disambiguation)
