= Fort Wayne Flash =

- Founded: 2007
- League: National Women's Football Association 2007–2008; Women's Football Alliance 2009
- Team history: Fort Wayne Flash 2007–2011
- Based in: Woodburn, Indiana
- Stadium: Woodlan Junior/Senior High School
- Colors: Red, Gold
- Head coach: Scott Floyd
- Championships: 0
- Cheerleaders: Flashettes

The Fort Wayne Flash was a full-contact women's outdoor football team of the Women's Football Alliance based in Fort Wayne, Indiana. The team started its exhibition season in 2006 and officially became part of the National Women's Football Association and began playing league games in 2007. Home games for the 2008 season were played at Bishop John M. D’Arcy Stadium on the University of Saint Francis campus, however, starting in 2009, the team played on the campus of Woodlan Senior/Junior High School in nearby Woodburn.

In 2008, the Flash clinched their first ever playoff berth and won the Midwest Division title. However, their playoff run was one-and-done, as they lost to the Columbus Comets 14–7.

Beginning in 2009, the Flash played in the Women's Football Alliance.

For 2010, the Flash were taking the season off to reorganize and cope with the death of player Karen O'Boyle and since then have never been heard of again.

== Season-By-Season ==
Season records
Season	W	L	T	Finish	Playoff results
Fort Wayne Flash (NWFA)
2007	4	4	0	2nd North West	–
2008	5	3	0	1st North Midwest	Lost First Round (Columbus)
Fort Wayne Flash (WFA)
2009	4	4	0	3rd National Central	–
Totals	13	12	0	(including playoffs)	

== 2009 Season Schedule ==
Date	Opponent	Home/Away	Result
April 18	West Michigan Mayhem	Away	Lost 0–41
April 25	Indiana Speed	Home	Lost 0–52
May 9	Dayton Diamonds	Away	Won 29–0
May 17	Toledo Reign	Away	Won 47–0
May 30	Indiana Speed	Away	Lost 7–14
June 6	West Michigan Mayhem	Home	Lost 0–35
June 13	Toledo Reign	Home	Won 38–0
June 20	Dayton Diamonds	Home	Won 68–20

== See also ==
- History of sports in Fort Wayne, Indiana
