= Missouri Phoenix =

- Founded: 2009
- League: Women's Spring Football LeagueWomen's Football Alliance
- Team history: NWFA (pre-2009); WFA (2009-2010)
- Based in: Kansas City, Kansas
- Stadium: Piper High School
- Colors: Navy, Orange, & Yellow
- President: Leilani Denney manager = Jessica Wagner
- Championships: 0
- Mascot: PHOENIX

The Kansas Phoenix, formerly called the Missouri Phoenix, was a professional women's American football team based in Kansas City, Kansas. The team was originally part of the National Women's Football Association before moving to the Women's Spring Football League for the 2009–10 season. Home games were played on the campus of Piper High School.

== Season-by-season ==
Season records
Season	W	L	T	Finish	Playoff results
2009	0	8	0	5th American Midwest	--

== 2009 Season Schedule ==
Date	Opponent	Home/Away	Result
April 18	Iowa Thunder	Home	Lost 0-54
April 25	St. Louis Slam	Home	Lost 0-6**
May 2	Minnesota Machine	Away	Lost 0-56
May 9	Kansas City Storm	Home	Lost 0-6
May 30	Iowa Thunder	Away	Lost 0-65
June 6	Kansas City Storm	Away	Lost 0-6
June 13	St. Louis Slam	Away	Lost 0-51
June 20	Minnesota Machine	Home	Lost 0-61

** = Game cancelled due to weather, St. Louis won by forfeit
