= Tri-State Bruisers =

- Founded: 2008
- League: Women's Spring Football League (2011-present)
- Team history: West Virginia Bruisers (2008-2011); Tri-State Bruisers (2012-present)
- Based in: Kenova, West Virginia
- Stadium: Ward-Craycraft Stadium
- Colors: Green and Black
- Owner: Brenda Graves
- Head coach: Tony Douglas
- Championships: 0

The Tri-State Bruisers were a women's semi-professional football team based in the Huntington–Ashland, WV–KY–OH, Metropolitan Statistical Area. As members of the Women's Spring Football League, the Bruisers play their home games at the historic Ward-Craycraft Stadium in Kenova, West Virginia, former home of the Ceredo-Kenova Wonders, a 12-time state Class AA Champion. They will be sharing their home field with the Ceredo-Kenova Crash, a men's semi-professional team.

The Bruisers came into existence as the West Virginia Bruisers in late 2008 and were originally an expansion team for the NWFA league, which later folded the same year. The following year, they announced entry into the Women's Football Alliance for 2010, but problems with the league caused them to push back their full-slate inaugural season and switch leagues. Brenda Graves, a former player in the NWFA, is the team owner and plays on the Defensive Line.

The West Virginia Bruisers became the only women's football team from the state of West Virginia to have ever won a divisional championship by winning the Mid States Division in 2011.

== Season-by-season ==
Season records
Season	W	L	T	Finish	Playoff results
2011	4	1	0	--	--
