= St. Louis Slam =

St. Louis based women's American football team

- Founded: 2003
- League: Women's Football Alliance
- Team history: NWFA (2003–2008); WFA (2009–present)
- Based in: St. Louis, Missouri
- Stadium: St. Mary's High School
- Colors: Black, Orange, White
- Owner: Quincy Davis
- Coaches: Quincy Davis, Myrt Davis, James Moore, Immanuel Gamble, Adam Hamilton
- Championships: 6 (2009, 2016, 2017, 2019, 2024, 2025 Pro WFA)

The St. Louis Slam is a women's professional American football team based in St. Louis, Missouri. They play in the Pro Division of the Women's Football Alliance (WFA), and won the WFA Pro national title in 2024 and 2025.

Home games are played at St. Mary's High School in St. Louis, Missouri. The team is coached by Quincy Davis.

== History ==
The Slam played in the National Women's Football Association from their inception in 2003 until 2008. In 2009 they joined WFA. On August 15, 2009, the Slam won the first Women's Football Alliance league championship game, defeating the West Michigan Mayhem 21–14 at Pan American Stadium in New Orleans, Louisiana. They won three more championships while competing in Division 2 of the WFA (2016, 2017, 2019).

In 2021, they elevated to the Pro Division of the WFA — the most competitive field of teams in the sport women's football. The Slam won their first Pro Division Championship in July 2024 when they defeated the 5 time national champions, Boston Renegades, on ESPN2.

== Season-by-season ==
Season records
Season	W	L	T	Finish	Playoff results
St. Louis Slam (NWFA)
2003	3	5	0	3rd Midwest Division	–
2004	5	3	0	2nd South Midwest	–
2005	5	3	0	7th North Division	–
2006	6	2	0	1st South Central	Won NWFA first round (Kentucky); Lost NWFA Quarterfinal (Massachusetts Mutiny)
2007	7	1	0	1st South North	Won Southern Conference Quarterfinals (Phoenix); Lost Southern Conference Semifinals (Oklahoma City)
2008	8	0	0	1st South Midwest	First-round bye for Southern Conference Quarterfinals; Lost Southern Conference Semifinals (H-Town)
St. Louis Slam (WFA)
2009	8	0	0	1st American Midwest Division	Won American Conference Semifinal (Las Vegas); Won American Conference Championship (Jacksonville); Won WFA national championship (West Michigan)
2010	8	0	0	1st National Central Division	Won National Conference Quarterfinal (Cleveland); Won National Conference Semifinal (Jacksonville); Lost National Conference Championship (Columbus)
2011	5	3	0	2nd National Central Division	–
2012	5	3	0	2nd American Division 11	Won Midwest Regional Quarterfinal (Minnesota); Lost Midwest Regional semifinal (Kansas City Titans)
2013	5	3	0	1st American Great Plains Division	Won Midwest Regional Quarterfinal (Acadiana Zydeco); Won Midwest Regional semifinal (Kansas City Titans); Lost Midwest Regional Final (Dallas Diamonds)
2014	0	0	0	Inactive	
2015	6	2	0	1st American Great Plains Division	Lost Conference Quarterfinal (Dallas Elite)
2016	4	2	0	1st American Conference (Tier 2)	Won Conference Quarterfinal (Houston Power); Won Conference Semifinal (Sin City Trojans); Won Division 2 Championship (Tampa Bay)
2017	7	1	0	1st American Conference (Tier 2)	Won Conference Quarterfinal (Madison Blaze); Won Conference Semifinal (Mile High Blaze); Won Division 2 Championship (Tampa Bay)
2018	0	0	0	Inactive	
2019	8	0	0	1st American Conference (Tier 2)	Won Conference Quarterfinal (Minnesota); Won Conference Semifinal (Mile High Blaze); Won Division 2 Championship (Detroit)
2020	0	0	0	Season cancelled (COVID-19)	
2021	0	0	0	Inactive	
2022	4	2	0	*	Did not make playoffs
2023	8	1	0	1st D1 American Conference	Won Conference Quarterfinal (Cali War); Won Conference Semifinal (Minnesota Vixen); Lost Pro Championship (Boston)
2024	9	0	0	1st WFA Pro American Conference	Won Conference Quarterfinal (Cali War); Won Conference Semifinal (Minnesota Vixen); Won Pro Championship (Boston)
2025	9	0	0	1st WFA Pro American Conference	Won Conference Quarterfinal (Nebraska Pride); Won Conference Semifinal (Minnesota Vixen); Won Pro Championship (D.C.)
Totals	133	38	0	(including playoffs)	

* = Current standing

== 2009 ==
=== Season schedule ===
Date	Opponent	Home/Away	Result
April 18	Kansas City Storm	Away	Won 77–0
April 25	Missouri Phoenix	Away	Won 6–0**
May 9	Minnesota Machine	Away	Won 28–0
May 16	Iowa Thunder	Home	Won 35–7
May 30	Kansas City Storm	Home	Won 88–0
June 6	Minnesota Machine	Home	Won 42–7
June 13	Missouri Phoenix	Home	Won 51–0
June 27	Iowa Thunder	Away	Won 40–10
July 11	Las Vegas Showgirlz (American Conference Semifinal)	Home	Won 30–12
July 25	Jacksonville Dixie Blues (American Conference Championship)	Home	Won 40–32
August 15	West Michigan Mayhem (WFA national championship)	Neutral (New Orleans)	Won 21–14

== 2010 ==
=== Season schedule ===
Date	Opponent	Home/Away	Result
April 10	Cincinnati Sizzle	Away	Won 35–0
April 17	Minnesota Machine	Home	Won 34–0
April 24	Indiana Speed	Away	Won 13–6
May 1	Kentucky Karma	Home	Won 50–0
May 8	Cincinnati Sizzle	Home	Won 57–0
May 22	Kentucky Karma	Away	Won 70–6
June 5	Iowa Thunder	Away	Won 37–14
June 19	Indiana Speed	Home	Won 16–14
June 26	Cleveland Fusion (National Conference Quarterfinal)	Home	Won 50–23
July 10	Jacksonville Dixie Blues (National Conference Semifinal)	Away	Won 52–26
July 17	Columbus Comets (National Conference Semifinal)	Away	Lost 14–21

== 2011 ==
=== Standings ===
2011 Central Division
	W	L	T	PCT	PF	PA	DIV	GB	STK
y-Chicago Force	8	0	0	1.000	413	84	4-0	---	W8
St. Louis Slam	5	3	0	0.625	261	140	2-2	3.0	W2
West Michigan Mayhem	3	5	0	0.375	173	204	0-4	5.0	L3

=== Season schedule ===
Date	Opponent	Home/Away	Result
April 9	Indy Crash	Home	Won 43–6
April 16	Dayton Diamonds	Home	Won 70–0
April 30	Chicago Force	Away	Lost 7–29
May 7	West Michigan Mayhem	Away	Won 36–6
May 14	Kansas City Tribe	Away	Lost 34–37
May 21	Chicago Force	Home	Lost 24–55
June 4	West Michigan Mayhem	Home	Won 41–7
June 18	Kentucky Karma	Away	Won 6–0**

** = Won by forfeit

== 2012 ==
=== Season schedule ===
Date	Opponent	Home/Away	Result
April 14	Iowa Xplosion	Home	
April 21	Kansas City Tribe	Away	
April 28	Kansas City Spartans	Home	
May 5	Chicago Force	Away	
May 19	Iowa Xplosion	Away	
June 2	Kansas City Spartans	Away	
June 9	Memphis Dynasty	Home	
June 16	Kansas City Tribe	Home	

== 2016 ==
=== Season schedule ===
Date	Opponent	Home/Away	Result
April 2	Derby City Dynamite	Away	Won 71–0
April 9	Kansas City Titans	Away	Loss 36–26**
April 23	Chicago Force	Away	Loss 46–6
April 30	Indy Crash	Home	Won 35–18
May 14	Derby City Dynamite	Home	Won 23–6
May 28	Kansas City Titans	Home	Won 32–0
June 25	Houston Power (WFA Playoffs Round 1)	Home	Won 53–0
July 9	Sin City Trojans (WFA Playoffs Round 2)	Away	Won 44–6
August 15	Tampa Bay Inferno (WFA national championship)	Neutral (Pittsburgh, Pennsylvania)	Won 38–7

== 2017 ==
=== Season schedule ===
Date	Opponent	Home/Away	Result
April 1	INDY CRASH	Away	Won 31–6
April 8	MADISON BLAZE	Home	Won 55–0
April 22	Kansas City Titans	Away	Won 34–6
May 6	Nebraska Stampede	Home	Won 1–0* Forfeit
May 13	Kansas City Titans	Home	Won 42–8
May 20	INDY CRASH	Home	Won 41–8
May 27	Minnesota Vixens	Away	Won 35–21
June 3	Chicago Force	Away	Lost 20–44
June 13	MADISON BLAZE (WFA Playoffs Round 2)	Home	Won 69–8
July 8	Mile High Blaze (WFA Playoffs Round 3)	Home	Won 43–21
