= Phoenix Prowlers =

Former women's football team

- Founded: 2007
- League: Women's Football Alliance
- Team history: Phoenix Prowlers (NWFA)
- Based in: Mesa, Arizona
- Stadium: Mesa Community College
- Colors: Black, purple, silver
- Owner: Bryant Sewall
- Head coach: Bryant Sewall
- Championships: 0

The Phoenix Prowlers were a professional football team that played in the Women's Football Alliance. Based in Phoenix, Arizona, the Prowlers played their home games in nearby Mesa at Mesa Community College.

Before joining the WFA in 2009, the Prowlers played two seasons in the National Women's Football Association. Their inaugural season of 2007 saw them finish with a perfect 8–0 regular season record (outscoring opponents 241–0, no points allowed) and winning South Division and Western Conference titles; however, they were upset in the semi-final round of the playoffs, losing to the St. Louis Slam by a score of 33–29. Despite finishing 5–3 in 2008 and second place in the Southern Conference West Division, the Prowlers missed the playoffs (only division winners qualified that year).

== Season-by-season ==
Season records
Season	W	L	T	Finish	Playoff results
Phoenix Prowlers (NWFA)
2007	8	0	0	1st West South	Lost semi-final (St. Louis)
2008	5	3	0	2nd South West	––
Phoenix Prowlers (WFA)
2009	3	5	0	3rd American Pacific	––
Totals	16	8	0	(including playoffs)	

== 2009 season schedule ==
Date	Opponent	Home/Away	Result
April 18	Marana She Devils	Away	Won 6–0**
May 9	California Lynx	Away	Lost 20–27
May 16	Marana She Devils	Home	Won 6–0**
May 23	Las Vegas Showgirlz	Home	Lost 14–26
May 30	Las Vegas Showgirlz	Away	Lost 8–47
June 6	California Lynx	Home	Lost 6–41
June 13	Marana She Devils	Away	Won 6–0**
June 20	Las Vegas Showgirlz	Home	Lost 8–35

** = Won by forfeit
