= Joyal =

Joyal is a surname. Notable people with the surname include:

- André Joyal (born 1943), Canadian mathematician
- André Joyal (economist), Canadian economist
- Dave Joyal (born 1983), American rock drummer
- Eddie Joyal (born 1940), Canadian ice hockey player
- Glenn Joyal, Manitoba judge
- Serge Joyal (born 1945), Canadian senator

== See also ==
- Fusing
