= West Michigan Mayhem =

Women's professional American football team

- Founded: 2002
- League: Women's Football Alliance
- Team history: Southwest Michigan Jaguars (NWFA) (2002–2005); West Michigan Mayhem (NWFA) (2006–2008); West Michigan Mayhem (WFA) (2009-Present)
- Based in: Kalamazoo, Michigan
- Stadium: Roy Davis Field
- Colors
- President: JP Plummer
- Head coach: Snoopy Shuster
- Championships: 0
- Mascot: Major Mayhem

The West Michigan Mayhem is a women's professional American football team based in Kalamazoo, Michigan. They play in the Women's Football Alliance. The Mayhem played in the National Women's Football Association from their inception in 2002 until 2008 (from 2002 to 2005 they were based in Otsego and known as the Southwest Michigan Jaguars). Home games are played at Roy Davis Field in Schoolcraft, Michigan.

== Season-By-Season ==
Season records
| Season | W | L | T | Finish | Playoff results |
|---|---|---|---|---|---|
Southwest Michigan Jaguars (NWFA)
| 2002 | 3 | 5 | 0 | 3rd Great Lakes Division | -- |
| 2003 | 4 | 4 | 0 | 3rd Great Lakes Division | -- |
| 2004 | 6 | 2 | 0 | 2nd North Great Lakes | Won Northern Conference Quarterfinal (Philadelphia); Lost Northern Conference Semifinal (D.C.) |
| 2005 | 7 | 1 | 0 | 4th North Division | Won Northern Conference Quarterfinal (Columbus); Lost Northern Conference Semifinal (Detroit) |
West Michigan Mayhem (NWFA)
| 2006 | 7 | 1 | 0 | 1st North West | Lost NWFA First Round (Columbus) |
| 2007 | 6 | 2 | 0 | 1st North West | Won Northern Conference Quarterfinal (Baltimore); Lost Northern Conference Semifinal (Pittsburgh) |
| 2008 | 8 | 0 | 0 | 1st North North | First-round bye for Northern Conference Quarterfinal; Won Northern Conference Semifinal (New York); Won Northern Conference Championship (Philadelphia); Lost NWFA Championship (H-Town) |
West Michigan Mayhem (WFA)
| 2009 | 8 | 0 | 0 | 1st National Central | Won National Conference Semifinal (Columbus); Won National Conference Championship (Philadelphia); Lost WFA National Championship (St. Louis) |
| 2010 | 7 | 1 | 0 | 1st National North Central | Lost National Conference Quarterfinal (Philadelphia) |
| 2011 | 3 | 5 | 0 | 3rd National Central | -- |
| 2012 | 4 | 4 | 0 | 3rd WFA National 6 | -- |
| 2013 | 4 | 5 | 0 | 1st round of Playoffs | -- |
| 2014 | 2 | 6 | 0 | 2nd round of Playoffs | -- |
| 2015 | 6 | 2 | 0 | 1st round of Playoffs | -- |
| Totals | 83 | 48 | 0 | (including playoffs) | |

* = current standing

== 2009 ==
=== Season schedule ===
| Date | Opponent | Home/Away | Result |
|---|---|---|---|
| April 18 | Fort Wayne Flash | Home | Won 41-0 |
| April 25 | Toledo Reign | Away | Won 47-0 |
| May 2 | Dayton Diamonds | Away | Won 56-0 |
| May 9 | The Toledo Reign | Home | Won 57-0 |
| May 16 | Indiana Speed | Away | Won 20-15 |
| June 6 | Fort Wayne Flash | Away | Won 35-0 |
| June 13 | Dayton Diamonds | Home | Won 55-0 |
| June 27 | Indiana Speed | Home | Won 21-0 |
| July 11 | Columbus Comets (National Conference Semifinal) | Home | Won 41-12 |
| July 25 | Philadelphia Liberty Belles (National Conference Championship) | Home | Won 28-21 |
| August 15 | St. Louis Slam (WFA National Championship) | Neutral (New Orleans) | Lost 14-21 |

== 2010 ==
=== Season schedule ===
| Date | Opponent | Home/Away | Result |
|---|---|---|---|
| April 10 | Detroit Dark Angels | Away | Won 52-0 |
| April 17 | Toledo Reign | Home | Won 71-0 |
| May 1 | Indiana Speed | Home | Won 45-13 |
| May 8 | Cleveland Fusion | Home | Won 55-0 |
| May 15 | Columbus Comets | Away | Lost 31-36 |
| May 22 | Toledo Reign | Away | Won 64-0 |
| June 12 | Cleveland Fusion | Away | Won 66-14 |
| June 19 | Detroit Dark Angels | Home | Won 73-0 |
| June 26 | Philadelphia Liberty Belles (National Conference Quarterfinal) | Away | Lost 33-35 |

== 2011 ==
=== Standings ===
2011 Central Division
| | W | L | T | PCT | PF | PA | DIV | GB | STK |
|---|---|---|---|---|---|---|---|---|---|
| y-Chicago Force | 8 | 0 | 0 | 1.000 | 413 | 84 | 4-0 | --- | W8 |
| St. Louis Slam | 5 | 3 | 0 | 0.625 | 261 | 140 | 2-2 | 3.0 | W2 |
| West Michigan Mayhem | 3 | 5 | 0 | 0.375 | 173 | 204 | 0-4 | 5.0 | L3 |

=== Season schedule ===
| Date | Opponent | Home/Away | Result |
|---|---|---|---|
| April 2 | Cincinnati Sizzle | Away | Won 20-0 |
| April 16 | Toledo Reign | Home | Won 54-12 |
| May 7 | St. Louis Slam | Home | Lost 6-36 |
| May 14 | Chicago Force | Away | Lost 6-15 |
| May 21 | Dayton Diamonds | Away | Won 63-0 |
| June 4 | St. Louis Slam | Away | Lost 7-41 |
| June 11 | Chicago Force | Home | Lost 3-76 |
| June 18 | Detroit Dark Angels | Home | Lost 14-24 |

== 2012 ==
=== Season schedule ===
| Date | Opponent | Home/Away | Result |
|---|---|---|---|
| April 14 | Cleveland Fusion | Away | |
| April 21 | Cincinnati Sizzle | Home | |
| April 28 | Toledo Reign | Home | |
| May 5 | Detroit Dark Angels | Away | |
| May 12 | Chicago Force | Away | |
| May 19 | Indy Crash | Home | |
| June 9 | Indy Crash | Away | |
| June 16 | Chicago Force | Home | |
