= Fusion =

Fusion, or synthesis, is the process of combining two or more distinct entities into a new whole.

Fusion may also refer to:

== Science and technology ==
=== Physics ===
- Nuclear fusion, multiple atomic nuclei combining to form one or more different atomic nuclei and subatomic particles
  - Fusion power, power generation using controlled nuclear fusion reactions
  - Cold fusion, a hypothesized type of nuclear reaction that would occur at or near room temperature
- Heat fusion, a welding process for joining two pieces of a thermoplastic material
- Melting, or transitioning from solid to liquid form

=== Biology and medicine ===
- Binaural fusion, the cognitive process of combining the auditory information received by both ears
- Binocular fusion, the cognitive process in binocular vision of combining the visual information received by both eyes
- Cell fusion, a process in which several uninuclear cells combine to form a multinuclear cell
- Gene fusion, a genetic event and molecular biology technique
- Lipid bilayer fusion, a part of several cellular processes
- Spinal fusion, a surgical technique used to combine two or more vertebrae
- Tooth fusion, a dental abnormality in which two teeth are joined

=== Computing ===
==== Computing techniques ====
- Image fusion, a process of combining relevant information from two or more images into a single image
- Loop fusion, a compiler program-optimization transformation that replaces multiple loops with a single one
- Sensor fusion, the combining of sensory data from disparate sources

==== Application software ====
- Autodesk Fusion, a product development CAD, CAM and CAE program by Autodesk (formerly Fusion 360)
- Blackmagic Fusion, a visual effects package
- BT Fusion, a defunct UK voice-over-IP service
- Lucidworks Fusion, a search engine platform
- NetObjects Fusion, a web design program

==== Middleware and operating system components ====
- Compiz Fusion, a community-maintained set of plugins for the Compiz Window Manager
- IBRIX Fusion, a parallel file system
- Oracle Fusion Middleware, a portfolio of standards-based software products that spans multiple services
- VMware Fusion, a virtual machine software product

== Arts and media ==
=== Comics ===
- Fusion (Eclipse Comics)
- Fusion (Marvel Comics), the name of two supervillains
- Fusion (Marvel/Top Cow), a crossover between Marvel and Top Cow Productions

=== Film and television ===
- "Fusion" (Star Trek: Enterprise), a first-season episode of Star Trek: Enterprise
- Fusion (TV channel), an American cable and satellite news channel

=== Gaming ===
- Dancing Stage Fusion, a 2004 music video game by Konami
- Fuzion, a merger of Interlock System and Hero System
- Metroid Fusion, a 2002 Game Boy Advance game
- Philadelphia Fusion, a E-sports gaming team
- Fusion (video game), 1988

=== Magazines ===
- Fusion (Kent State University)
- Fusion (music magazine), an American music magazine, 1967 to 1974
- Fusion Magazine (political magazine), founded and edited by Glenn Beck
- Fusion Magazine (scientific magazine), predecessor to 21st Century Science and Technology magazine

=== Music and dance ===
- Jazz fusion, genre that combines rock and jazz, starting in 1960s
- Fusion dance, a type of partner dance that combines two or more dance styles
- Fusion (Jimmy Giuffre 3 album), 1961
- Fusion (Jeremy Steig album), 1972
- Fusion (Sawthis album), 2006
- Fusion Festival, a music festival in Lärz, Germany
- Guardian (band), a Christian rock band formerly called Fusion
- Fusion, a British band whose members included Nik Kershaw and Reg Webb

== Businesses and organizations ==
=== Non-profit and political organizations ===
- Fusion Party, a name for multiple political parties in American history
- Fusion Party (Australia)
- Fusion Energy Foundation, a defunct American non-profit think tank co-founded by Lyndon LaRouche in 1974
- Fusion International, an Australian-based Christian organisation
- Fusion of Haitian Social Democrats, a Haitian political party
- Fusion – Sarvodaya ICT4D Movement, Information and Communications Technology for Development, Sri Lanka

=== Sports teams ===
- Cleveland Fusion, a women's American football team in the NWFA
- Fort Wayne Fusion, Arena football team
- Miami Fusion, a professional soccer club in Fort Lauderdale
- Philadelphia Fusion, an American esports team

=== Other organizations ===
- Fusion Academy, a private alternative school in several U.S. cities
- Fusion Media Group, a division of Univision Communications

== Law and politics ==
- Fusion of powers, a feature of some parliamentary forms of government
- Fusionism (politics), the combination of libertarianism and various types of conservatism
- Electoral fusion, an arrangement where two or more political parties support a common candidate
- Fusion of law and equity, combining the rules of equity and common law into one set of rules
- Fusion of the legal profession, the elimination of the distinction between barristers and solicitors

== Products ==
- AMD Fusion, a combined microprocessor and GPU design, now branded as AMD Accelerated Processing Unit
- Ford Fusion (Americas), a mid-sized car produced by Ford Motor Company
- Ford Fusion (Europe), a mini MPV produced by Ford Motor Company
- Schumacher Fusion, a radio-controlled car
- Gillette Fusion, a safety razor by Gillette
- Fusion, a brand name of computer hardware used by Arctic

== Other uses ==
- Fusion (phonetics), the merger of phonological features of two speech segments into one feature
- Fusion cuisine, the combination of elements of various culinary traditions
- Fusional language or inflected language, a type of language
- Information fusion, the merging of information from disparate sources

== See also ==
- Fuse (disambiguation)
- Fusing (disambiguation)
- Cold fusion (disambiguation)
- Fission (disambiguation), opposite of fusion
