= Tennessee Train =

- Sport: Women's American football
- Founded: 2013
- League: Independent Women's Football League (2015–present); Women's Football Alliance (2013–14)
- Conference: Midwest (2016–present); Eastern (2015)
- Division: South Atlantic (2015)
- Team history: Tennessee Train (2015–present)
- Based in: Chattanooga, Tennessee
- Stadium: Chattanooga Central High School (2015–present); Hixson High School (2013–14)
- Colors: Red, white, blue
- President: Starlisa Horton
- Head coach: Nathaniel Billingsley
- Championships: none
- Website: Official website

The Tennessee Train are a women's American football team of the Independent Women's Football League (IWFL). They are located in Chattanooga, Tennessee, and play their home games at Chattanooga Central High School. The team was founded in 2013 as a member of the Women's Football Alliance. The Train became members of the IWFL in 2015.

== Season-by-season records ==
Season records
Season	W	L	T	Finish	Playoff results
2014	5	3	0	—	—
2015	3	5	0	—	did not qualify
Totals	8	8	0	—	—
