= Cold junction =

Cold junction may refer to:

- Cold junction (thermocouple), a contact of a thermocouple
- Cold junction (soldering), a cold soldering joint in soldering

== See also ==
- Cold fusion (disambiguation)
- Cold contact (disambiguation)
- Cold joint
