= Cleveland Fusion =

Women's American football team in Ohio

- Founded: 2002
- League: Women's Football Alliance
- Team history: NWFA (2002–2008); WFA (2009–Present)
- Based in: Cleveland, Ohio
- Stadium: Maple Heights Mustang Stadium
- Colors: Seal Brown, Orange, White
- President: T.J. Monachino
- Head coach: Erik Keister
- Championships: 0

The Cleveland Fusion is a women's professional American football team based in Cleveland, Ohio, United States. They play in the Women's Football Alliance. The Fusion played in the National Women's Football Association from their inception in 2002 until 2008. Home games are played at Mustang Stadium at Maple Heights High School.

== History ==
The Cleveland Fusion were founded in 2002. They joined the Women's Football Alliance in 2009 after seven seasons in the National Women's Football Association.

The team used to play at Bedford High School's Bearcat Stadium, as well as at Byers Field in Parma, Ohio. A number of players have been drawn from Cleveland-area colleges, including Case Western Reserve University.

T.J. Monachino took over the team before the 2017 season.

Multiple organizations have praised the Fusion for promoting gay pride and breaking down gender roles.

== Season-by-season results ==
Season records
Season	W	L	T	Finish	Playoff results
Cleveland Fusion (NWFA)
2002	6	3	0	2nd Great Lakes	Lost League Quarterfinal (Massachusetts)
2003	7	3	0	2nd Northern Great Lakes	Won Northern Conference Quarterfinal (Baltimore); Lost Northern Conference Semifinal (Detroit)
2004	3	5	0	4th Northern Great Lakes	–
2005	5	3	0	10th Northern	–
2006	8	2	0	1st Northern North Central	Won League Wild Card (Philadelphia); Lost League Quarterfinal (Oklahoma City)
2007	8	3	0	3rd Northern Central	Won Northern Conference Quarterfinal (Connecticut); Won Northern Conference Semifinal (Massachusetts); Lost Northern Conference Championship (Pittsburgh)
2008	5	3	0	2nd Northern Central	–
Cleveland Fusion (WFA)
2009	4	4	0	3rd National Mid-Atlantic	–
2010	6	3	0	2nd National North Central	Lost National Conference Quarterfinal (St. Louis)
2011	5	3	0	2nd National Mid-Atlantic	–
2012	2	6	0	2nd National Mideast	–
2013	9	1	0	1st National North Central	Won National Conference Wild Card (West Michigan); Lost National Conference Quarterfinal (Chicago)
2014	7	3	0	2nd National Northeast	Won National Conference Wild Card (Indy); Lost National Conference Quarterfinal (Boston)
2015	6	3	0	2nd National Mid-Atlantic	Lost National Conference Quarterfinal (Chicago)
2016	4	5	0	6th National	Lost National Conference Quarterfinal (Boston)
Totals	85	50	0	(including playoffs)	

== 2015 roster ==
Cleveland Fusion roster
Quarterbacks: 49 Keri Palma; Running backs: 31 Mercedes Ephraim; 38 Andrea Mixon; Wide receivers: 81 Maria Jackson; 19 Kanisha Coward; Tight ends: 83 Valerie Riley	Offensive & Defensive Line: 35 Jacque Martin; 56 Tiffany Johnson; 60 Britney Wallace; 61 Daniece Harris; 63 Tania Torres; 66 Yermesha Kyle; 77 Shanolen Kendall; 78 Elizabeth Dillow; 91 Caprita Bell; 93 Kathy Dougherty; Linebackers: 21 Stefanie Russo; 23 Desiree Alexander; 45 Veronica Rucker; 51 Christine Mason; 52 Chelsea Biggers	Defensive backs: 26 Angela Mason; 32 Amanda Cooch; 44 Katie Green; Kickers: 86 Lauren Acker	Injured Reserve: 63 Marie "Pony" Vibbert; Exempt List: currently vacant; Practice squad: currently vacant; rookies in italics; Roster updated December 2015; 26 Active, 0 Inactive, 0 PS

== 2009 ==
=== Season Schedules ===
Date	Opponent	Home/Away	Result
April 18	Kentucky Karma	Home	Won 38–14
April 25	Pittsburgh Force	Home	Lost 28–34
May 9	Columbus Comets	Away	Lost 12–30
May 16	Kentucky Karma	Away	Lost 12–20
May 30	Pittsburgh Force	Away	Won 34–16
June 6	Columbus Comets	Home	Lost 7–20
June 13	Cincinnati Sizzle	Home	Won 36–18
June 27	Cincinnati Sizzle	Away	Won 48–14

== 2010 ==
=== Season Schedules ===
Date	Opponent	Home/Away	Result
April 10	Toledo Reign	Away	Won 18–7
April 17	Kentucky Karma	Away	Won 54–6
April 24	Pittsburgh Force	Home	Won 60–3
May 1	Detroit Dark Angels	Home	Won 39–12
May 8	West Michigan Mayhem	Away	Lost 0–55
May 15	Toledo Reign	Home	Won 62–0
June 5	Detroit Dark Angels	Away	Won 34–14
June 19	West Michigan Mayhem	Home	Lost 14–66
June 26	St. Louis Slam (National Conference Quarterfinal)	Home	Lost 23–50

== 2011 ==
=== Standings ===
2011 Mid Atlantic Division
	W	L	T	PCT	PF	PA	DIV	GB	STK
y-Pittsburgh Passion	8	0	0	1.000	270	35	8-0	---	W8
Cleveland Fusion	5	3	0	0.625	267	90	5-3	3.0	L1
Columbus Comets	5	3	0	0.625	191	60	5-3	3.0	W2
Pittsburgh Force	2	6	0	0.000	8	364	2-6	6.0	L1
Erie Illusion	0	8	0	0.250	68	255	0-8	8.0	L8

=== Season Schedules ===
Date	Opponent	Home/Away	Result
April 2	Columbus Comets	Away	Lost 13–16
April 16	Pittsburgh Passion	Home	Lost 8–26
April 30	Erie Illusion	Home	Won 50–0
May 7	Pittsburgh Force	Away	Won 54–0
May 14	Columbus Comets	Home	Won 16–6
May 21	Erie Illusion	Away	Won 50–0
June 4	Pittsburgh Force	Home	Won 76–0
June 11	Pittsburgh Passion	Away	Lost 0–42

== 2012 ==
=== Standings ===
2012 Division 4
	W	L	T	PCT	PF	PA	DIV	GB	STK
Detroit Dark Angels	8	0	0	1.000	248	46	4-0	---	W8
Cleveland Fusion	2	5	0	0.333	60	168	2-1	3	L1
Pittsburgh Force	0	6	0	0.000	26	210	0-4	5	L6

=== Season schedule ===
Date	Opponent	Home/Away	Result
April 14	West Michigan Mayhem	Home	Lost 7–23
April 21	Pittsburgh Force	Home	Won 33–6
April 28	Detroit Dark Angels	Away	Lost 6–14
May 5	Pittsburgh Passion	Away	Lost 0–49
May 12	Pittsburgh Force	Away	Won 14–6
May 19	Chicago Force	Home	Lost 0–48
June 2	Columbus Comets	Away	Lost 0–22
June 9	Detroit Dark Angels	Home	Lost 14–17

== 2013 ==
=== Standings ===
2013 Division 3
	W	L	T	PCT	PF	PA	DIV	GB	STK
Cleveland Fusion-y	8	0	0	1.000	322	18	6-0	---	W8
Cincinnati Sizzle	4	4	0	0.500	186	264	3-3	3	W1
Derby City Dynamite	3	5	0	0.375	136	238	2-4	4	W3
Toledo Reign	1	7	0	0.125	65	278	1-5	5	L3

=== Season schedule ===
Date	Opponent	Home/Away	Result
April 13	Derby City Dynamite	Home	Won 44–0
April 20	Toledo Reign	Away	Won 36–6
April 27	Derby City Dynamite	Away	Won 40–0
May 4	Central Maryland	Home	Won 42–0
May 11	Cincinnati Sizzle	Away	Won 47–6
May 18	Toledo Reign	Home	Won 50–0
June 1	Cincinnati Sizzle	Home	Won 55–6
June 8	Central Maryland	Away	Won 48–0

== 2014 ==
=== Standings ===
2014 WFA Northeast Division
	W	L	T	PCT	PF	PA	DIV	GB	STK
y - Boston Militia	7	0	0	1.000	199	92	2-0	---	W7
z - Cleveland Fusion	6	2	0	0.750	224	121	0-2	2	W4
Pittsburgh Force	3	2	0	0.600	64	80	0-0	5	L1

y - clinched division title
z - clinched playoff berth

=== Season schedule ===
Date	Opponent	Home/Away	Result
April 5	Columbus Comets	Home	Won 27–7
April 19	Boston Militia	Away	Lost 7–47
April 26	Indy Crash	Home	Won 7–0
May 3	Boston Militia	Home	Lost 7–48
May 10	Cincinnati Sizzle	Away	Won 71–0
May 17	Toledo Reign	Away	Won 46–0
May 31	Columbus Comets	Away	Won 23–12
June 7	West Michigan Mayhem	Home	Won 33–8

== 2015 ==
=== Season schedule ===
Date	Opponent	Home/Away	Result
April 11	Central Maryland Seahawks	Away	Won 35–0
April 18	Columbus Comets	Home	Won 49–0
April 25	Indy Crash	Home	Won 35–0
May 9	Columbus Comets	Away	Won 47–6
May 16	Boston Renegades	Home	Lost 20–24
May 30	Detroit Dark Angels	Away	Won 35–0
June 6	DC Divas	Away	Lost 7–27
June 13	West Michigan Mayhem	Home	Won 42–12

== 2016 ==
=== Season schedule ===
Date	Opponent	Home/Away	Result
April 2	Columbus Comets	Away	Lost 13–16
April 16	Pittsburgh Passion	Home	Lost 8–26
April 30	Erie Illusion	Home	Won 50–0
May 7	Pittsburgh Passion	Away	Won 54–0
May 14	Columbus Comets	Home	Won 16–6
May 21	Erie Illusion	Away	Won 50–0
June 4	Pittsburgh Passion	Home	Won 76–0
June 11	Pittsburgh Passion	Away	Lost 0–42

== Logos ==
Cleveland Fusion (2002-2007)

Cleveland Fusion (2008–present)
