= Rubenstein Stadium =

Sporting venue

Coordinates: 40.5912°N 80.2267°W

Rubenstein Stadium, also known as "Moe Rubenstein Stadium", is a sports stadium in Ambridge, Pennsylvania, in the western suburbs of Pittsburgh. It was the home of the Pittsburgh Passion women's football team from 2004 to 2005 and the Pittsburgh Force from 2009 to 2011. It is the historical home of Ambridge Area High School football with a capacity of nearly 10,000 today.
