= Dry contact =

Type of electronic contact

Dry contact may mean any of the following in electronics:

- No current: A dry contact is the synonym of volt free — it is not "wetted" by a voltage source. Dry contact can refer to a secondary set of contacts of a relay circuit which does not make or break the primary current being controlled by the relay. Usually some other contacts or devices have the job of starting or stopping the primary current being controlled. For example, a reed relay matrix switch is normally switched with all contacts dry. After the contacts are all connected, a wire spring relay is energized and connects a supervisory scan point, or main switch, through which the primary current being controlled then flows. Dry contacts are primarily employed in extra-low voltage (less than 50 V AC) distribution circuits.
- No mercury: The wet contact of a mercury-wetted relay gives certain operational advantages. Dry contacts means a relay that does not use mercury-wetted contacts.
- Dry joint: A dry contact can be confused with a dry joint, which is a type of poorly soldered joint in which the solder failed to wet the metal. These are liable to fail electrically. The term dry joint is also used less precisely to mean any sort of unsatisfactorily soldered joint.

== See also ==
- Cold contact (disambiguation)
