= Chicago Force =

Women's American football team

- Founded: 2003
- League: IWFL (2003–2010); WFA (2011–2017)
- Team history: Chicago Force (2003–2017)
- Based in: Chicago, Illinois
- Stadium: Lane Stadium; Winnemac Stadium; Holmgren Athletic Complex; Lazier Field
- Colors: black, red, white
- President: Linda Bache
- Head coach: John Konecki
- Championships: 1 (2013 WFA)
- Dancers: Chicago Spirit Brigade
- Mascot: Taylor Malloy
- Website: www.chicagoforcefootball.com

The Chicago Force was a women's American football team. Founded in 2003 by Lisa Cole, the team played at De La Salle HS & St. Rita HS – both on Chicago's South side; Lane Stadium at Lane Technical College Prep High School, Holmgren Athletic Complex at North Park University on Chicago's North Side, and at Winnemac Stadium.

The Force played its inaugural game on March 29, 2003, defeating the Detroit Blaze 49–0 at De La Salle Institute.

The team played the 2012–2014 seasons at Lazier Field on the campus of Evanston Township High School, and for the 2015 season onward, back at Lane Tech.

From their inaugural season until 2010, the Chicago Force was part of the Independent Women's Football League. Following that, the team moved to the Women's Football Alliance. The Chicago Force ceased operations after the 2017 season.

== Season-By-Season ==
Season records
Season	W	L	T	Finish	Playoff results
Chicago Force (IWFL)
2003	9	0	0	1st Western Southwest	Won Western Conference Semifinal (Corvallis); Lost Western Conference Championship (Sacramento)
2004	6	2	0	2nd Eastern Mid-Atlantic	Lost Eastern Conference Semifinal (New York)
2005	8	2	0	1st Western Midwest	Lost Western Conference Semifinal (Tacoma)
2006	6	2	0	2nd Western Midwest	Lost Western Conference Semifinal (Detroit)
2007	5	3	0	2nd Western Midwest	–
2008	8	0	0	1st Eastern Midwest	Won Eastern Conference Semifinal (Detroit); Won Eastern Conference Championship (Pittsburgh); Lost IWFL Championship (Dallas)
2009	6	2	0	2nd Western Midwest	Won Western Conference Semifinal (Seattle); Lost Western Conference Championship (Kansas City)
2010	7	1	0	2nd Western Midwest	Lost Western Conference Semifinal (Dallas)
Chicago Force (WFA)
2011	8	0	0	1st National Central	Won National Conference Quarterfinal (Pittsburgh); Lost National Conference Semifinal (Boston)
2012	8	0	0	1st National Great Lakes	Won National Conference Quarterfinal (Indy); Won National Conference Semifinal (Jacksonville); Won National Conference Championship (Boston); Lost WFA Championship (San Diego)
2013	8	0	0	1st National Great Lakes	Won National Conference Quarterfinal (Cleveland); Won National Conference Semifinal (Atlanta); Won National Conference Championship (Boston); Won WFA Championship (Dallas)
2014	6	1	0	1st National Great Lakes	Won National Conference Quarterfinal (West Michigan); Won National Conference Semifinal (Miami); Lost National Conference Championship (Boston)
2015	7	1	0	1st National Great Lakes	Won National Conference Quarterfinal (Cleveland); Won National Conference Semifinal (Boston); Lost National Conference Championship (D.C.)
2016	7	1	0	2nd National	Lost National Conference Semifinal (Boston)
2017	7	1	0	2nd National	Won National Conference Semifinal (Pittsburgh); Lost National Conference Championship (Boston)
Totals	123	16	0	(including playoffs)	

== 2009 ==
=== Season schedule ===
Date	Opponent	Home/Away	Result
April 11	Iowa Crush	Away	Won 54–0
April 18	Wisconsin Warriors	Home	Won 38–20
April 25	Minnesota Vixen	Away	Won 55–0
May 2	Kansas City Tribe	Home	Won 28–6
May 16	Detroit Demolition	Away	Lost 19–21
May 23	Minnesota Vixen	Home	Won 53–0
May 30	Kansas City Tribe	Away	Lost 14–30
June 13	Detroit Demolition	Home	Won 26–6
June 27	Seattle Majestics (Western Conference Semifinal)	Away	Won 28–14
July 11	Kansas City Tribe (Western Conference Championship)	Away	Lost 16–40

== 2010 ==
=== Season schedule ===
Date	Opponent	Home/Away	Result
April 3	Wisconsin Warriors	Home	Won 42–0
April 10	Wisconsin Wolves	Home	Won 62–0
April 17	Wisconsin Warriors	Away	Won 30–7
May 1	Kansas City Tribe	Home	Won 14–12
May 8	Minnesota Vixen	Away	Won 56–0
May 15	Wisconsin Wolves	Away	Won 49–0
May 22	Pittsburgh Passion	Home	Won 7–0
June 5	Kansas City Tribe	Away	Lost 12–30
June 12	Dallas Diamonds (Western Conference Semifinal)	Away	Lost 20–27

== 2011 ==
=== Standings ===
2011 Central Division
	W	L	T	PCT	PF	PA	DIV	GB	STK
y-Chicago Force	8	0	0	1.000	413	84	4-0	---	W8
St. Louis Slam	5	3	0	0.625	261	140	2-2	3.0	W2
West Michigan Mayhem	3	5	0	0.375	173	204	0-4	5.0	L3

=== Season schedule ===
Date	Opponent	Home/Away	Result
April 9	Minnesota Machine	Home	Won 69–0
April 16	Wisconsin Wolves	Away	Won 58–0
April 30	St. Louis Slam	Home	Won 29–7
May 7	Kansas City Tribe	Home	Won 34–26
May 14	West Michigan Mayhem	Home	Won 15–6
May 21	St. Louis Slam	Away	Won 55–24
June 11	West Michigan Mayhem	Away	Won 76–3
June 18	Indy Crash	Away	Won 77–18
June 25	Pittsburgh Passion (National Conference Quarterfinal)	Home	Won 41–31
July 9	Boston Militia (National Conference Semifinal)	Home	Lost 23–50

== 2012 ==
=== Season schedule ===
Date	Opponent	Home/Away	Result
April 14	Kansas City Tribe	Away	Won 21–14
April 21	Columbus Comets	Home	Won 47–0
April 28	Indy Crash	Away	Won 72–0
May 5	St. Louis Slam	Home	Won 57–14
May 12	West Michigan Mayhem	Home	Won 54–0
May 19	Cleveland Fusion	Away	Won 48–0
June 2	Indy Crash	Home	Won 71–0
June 16	West Michigan Mayhem	Away	Won 55–6
