= Cold fusion (disambiguation) =

Cold fusion is a hypothesized type of nuclear reaction that would occur at or near room temperature.

Cold fusion may also refer to:

== In science ==
- Muon-catalyzed fusion, before Fleischmann and Pons, was sometimes called cold fusion
- Pyroelectric fusion, first achieved in 2005, uses a pyroelectric crystal to accelerate ions to fusion energies with room temperature equipment
- Polywell fusion, uses inertial electrostatic confinement to attract and confine ions so densely that they fuse
- Nuclear fusion where the product nuclei have a relatively low excitation energy of around 10 to 20 MeV (this meaning is used mostly in the field of the synthesis of superheavy elements)

== In culture ==
- Cold Fusion (novel), 1996 novel by Lance Parkin, based on the sci-fi TV series Doctor Who
- "Cold Fusion" (The Twilight Zone), an episode of the 2002 TV series
- Cold Fusion (2001 film), a documentary film about skiing and snowboarding by Warren Miller
- Cold Fusion (2011 film), a sci-fi film starring Adrian Paul and William Hope

== In computing ==
- Adobe ColdFusion, application server and development framework for computer software
- ColdFusion Markup Language, CFML, scripting programming language for the Adobe server

== See also ==
- Cold contact (disambiguation)
- Cold joint
- Cold junction (disambiguation)
- Cold welding
- Fusion (disambiguation)
