= Fission =

Fission, a splitting of something into two or more parts, may refer to:

- Fission (biology), the division of a single entity into two or more parts and the regeneration of those parts into separate entities resembling the original
- Nuclear fission, when the nucleus of an atom splits into smaller parts
- Fission (band), a Swedish death metal band
- Fission (album), by Jens Johansson
- Fission, a splinter group of Atomwaffen Divsion

== See also ==
- Fusion (disambiguation)
