= National Women's Football Association =

Full contact American football league

- Sport: American football
- Founded: 2000
- Folded: 2008
- Country: United States
- Last champion: H-Town Texas Cyclones (now in WFA)

The National Women's Football Association (NWFA) was a full-contact American football league for women headquartered in Nashville, Tennessee. The league was founded by Catherine Masters in 2000, as the two benchmark teams, the Alabama Renegades and the Nashville Dream played each other six times in exhibition games. The opening season was in 2001 featuring ten teams. The NWFA did not officially field any teams for the 2009 season.

The NWFA was originally called the National Women's Football League, but changed its name after the 2002 season. The name change came after pressure from the National Football League. The NFL also required the league to change the logos of some teams whose logos resembled those of NFL teams.

League founder Catherine Masters was inducted into the American Football Association's Semi Pro Football Hall of Fame in 2006.

== League rules ==
NWFA teams played according to standard National Football League rules with the following notable exceptions:

- TDY-sized football
- only one foot in-bounds is required for a reception
- no blocking below the waist downfield

== List of teams ==
Team	Post-2009 status	Notes
Alabama Renegades	joined IWFL	became the Tennessee Valley Tigers
Antelope Valley Bombers	defunct	
Arizona Wildfire	defunct	
Asheville Assault	defunct	
Atlanta Leopards	defunct	
Austin Outlaws	joined WFA	
Baltimore Burn	joined WSFL	
Chattanooga Locomotion	joined IWFL	
Cincinnati Sizzle	joined WFA	
Cleveland Fusion	joined WFA	
Clinton County Chaos	joined WSFL	
Columbus Comets	joined WFA	
Connecticut Crushers	joined IWFL	
D.C. Divas	joined WFA	
Dayton Diamonds	joined WFA	
Detroit Danger, Detroit Demolition	joined IWFL	
East Texas SaberKats	joined WFA	had planned to play in NWFA for 2009
Emerald Coast Barracudas	joined WFA	
Erie Illusion	joined IWFL	
Evansville Express	defunct	
Fort Wayne Flash	joined WFA	
Gulf Coast Herricanes	defunct	
H-Town Texas Cyclones	joined WFA	
Indiana Thunder	defunct	
Indianapolis Chaos	defunct	
Iowa Thunder	joined WSFL	
Jacksonville Dixie Blues	joined WFA	had planned to play in NWFA for 2009
Jersey Justice	joined IWFL	had planned to play in NWFA for 2009
Junction City Jaguars	defunct	
Kansas City Krunch	defunct	
Kentucky Karma	joined WFA	
Keystone Assault	joined WFA	had planned to play in NWFA for 2009
Knoxville Summit	defunct	
Knoxville Tornadoes	defunct	
Lone Star Mustangs	joined WFA	had planned to play in NWFA for 2009
Los Angeles Amazons	joined IWFL	
Maine Freeze	defunct	
Marana She-Devils	joined WFA	had planned to play in NWFA for 2009
Memphis Belles	joined WFA	
Minnesota Vixen	joined IWFL	
Missouri Phoenix	joined WSFL	renamed as the Kansas Phoenix
Modesto Maniax	joined IWFL	
Muscle Shoals SmasHers	defunct	
Nashville Dream	defunct	
New Jersey Titans	joined WFA	
New Orleans Blaze	joined WFA	
New York Nemesis	joined IWFL	
Oklahoma City Lightning	joined WFA	
Pensacola Power	joined WFA	became the Gulf Coast Riptide
Philadelphia Phoenix	joined IWFL	now the Philadelphia Firebirds
Phoenix Prowlers	joined WFA	
Pittsburgh Force	joined WFA	had planned to play in NWFA for 2009
Pittsburgh Passion	joined IWFL	
Richmond Dream	defunct	
Roanoke Revenge	defunct	
Rochester Raptors	defunct	
South Bend GoldenHawks	defunct	
St. Louis Slam	joined WFA	
Tennessee Venom	defunct	
Tidewater Floods	defunct	
Tree Town Spitfire	defunct	
Ventura Black Widows	joined WSFL	had planned to play in NWFA for 2009
West Michigan Mayhem	joined WFA	
West Virginia Bruisers	joined WSFL	had planned to play in NWFA for 2009
West Virginia Wonders	joined WSFL	became the West Virginia Wildfire
Wisconsin Riverters	defunct	

- IWFL = Independent Women's Football League
- WFA = Women's Football Alliance
- WSFL = Women's Spring Football League

== Championship games ==
- 2001 Philadelphia Liberty Belles 40, Pensacola Power 7
- 2002 Detroit Danger 48, Massachusetts Mutiny 30
- 2003 Detroit Demolition 28, Pensacola Power 21
- 2004 Detroit Demolition 52, Oklahoma City Lightning 0
- 2005 Detroit Demolition 74, Pensacola Power 0
- 2006 D.C. Divas 28, Oklahoma City Lightning 7
- 2007 Pittsburgh Passion 32, Columbus Comets 0
- 2008 H-Town Texas Cyclones 39, West Michigan Mayhem 10

== See also ==
- Women's football in the United States
- Women's American football
- List of leagues of American football
- Women's National Basketball Association
