= Cold contact =

Cold contact may refer to:

- Cold contact (marketing), a sales strategy also known as cold calling
- Cold contact (switch), a particular switch or relay contact
- Cold contact (soldering), a cold soldering joint

== See also ==
- Cold junction (disambiguation)
- Cold fusion (disambiguation)
- Cold joint
- Dry contact
