= Muscle Shoals SmasHers =

- Founded: 2004
- League: National Women's Football Association
- Team history: Muscle Shoals SmasHers
- Based in: Muscle Shoals, Alabama
- Stadium: Colbert County High School
- Colors: Blue and white

The Muscle Shoals SmasHers were a full-contact women's outdoor football team of the National Women's Football Association. The team officially became part of the NWFA and began playing league games in 2004.

Home games for the SmasHers were played at the Colbert County High School football stadium in Muscle Shoals, Alabama.
