= Fusing (manufacturing) =

For the art, see stained glass fusing.

Fusing is a type of manufacturing process for joining or terminating electrical magnet wire, that is coated with a varnish (film) type insulation, to itself or some type of electrical terminal, without prior removal of the insulation. During the fusing process, the varnish film insulation is vaporized automatically. The entire process takes between a quarter of a second to 50 seconds, depending upon the geometry of the wires being joined.
