= Pittsburgh Passion =

Pittsburgh, Pennsylvania based women's sports team

- Founded: 2002
- League: NWFA (2003–2007); IWFL (2008–2010); WFA (2011–2013); IWFL (2014–2015); WFA (2016–present)
- Team history: Pittsburgh Passion (2003–present)
- Based in: Pittsburgh, Pennsylvania
- Stadium: Mihalik-Thompson Stadium; Slippery Rock, Pennsylvania
- Colors: Black & Gold, White
- Owner: Teresa Conn, Anthony Misitano & estate of Franco Harris
- Head coach: Teresa Conn
- Championships: 3 (NWFA: 2007; IWFL: 2014, 2015)

The Pittsburgh Passion are a women's professional American football team based in the Pittsburgh metropolitan area. The Passion compete in the Women's Football Alliance (WFA) as a member of the National Conference. Founded in 2002, the Passion are the sixth-oldest franchise in the WFA, and second oldest in the National Conference.

The Passion is currently owned by Teresa Conn, Anthony Misitano, and the family of Franco Harris.

They currently play their home games at Mihalik-Thompson Stadium in Slippery Rock, Pennsylvania, which also host the Slippery Rock University football team. Prior to Mihalik-Thompson Stadium, the Passion had played at several high schools in the Pittsburgh-area including Belle Vernon, Moe Rubenstein Stadium, George K. Cupples Stadium and West Allegheny High School.

== History ==
In 2003, the Passion played its home games at Belle Vernon Area High School. The team finished its inaugural season with a 2–6 record. The average attendance at each of their four home games that season was between 2,500 and 3,000 fans.

In 2004 season, the Passion changed its home stadium to Ambridge High School's Moe Rubenstein Stadium. The team improved its regular season record to 6–2, just missing the playoffs as a Northern Conference wildcard team. The Passion led the league in attendance for 2004 with crowds approaching 4,000 fans per game.

In 2005, the Passion carried an active roster of 55 players along with a practice squad.

In 2006, the Passion have played its home games at George K. Cupples Stadium (formerly "South Stadium") in the South Side of Pittsburgh.

In 2007, the Passion recorded an undefeated regular season going 8–0. After winning all three of their home playoff games, the team improved to 11-0 after victories over Erie, the West Michigan Mayhem, and Cleveland. The team then won the National Championship Game on July 21, 2007, against the Columbus Comets by a score of 32–0.

In 2008, the Passion recorded their second consecutive perfect regular season, finishing 8–0, winning the North Atlantic Division title, and defeating the Orlando Mayhem in the Eastern Conference Semifinal. However, they lost the Eastern Conference Championship to the Chicago Force by a score of 8–7, ending their 23-game winning streak that dated back to 2006.

In 2009, the Passion finished 7–1, good for the Eastern Conference wild card spot. However, they lost the Eastern Conference Semifinal to eventual conference champion D.C. Divas 27–17.

In 2010, the Passion finished 4-4, missing the playoffs for the first time since 2006.

For 2011, the Passion joined the Women's Football Alliance. They finished their inaugural regular season with a perfect 8-0 and won the Mid-Atlantic Division title before losing to the Chicago Force in the National Conference quarterfinal game.

The Passion returned to the IWFL for the 2014 season, finishing with the regular season with an 8-0 record and winning their second championship. In 2015, the Passion completed their second straight undefeated season, winning another IWFL championship.

For the 2016 season, the Passion returned to the WFA, winning their fourth consecutive division title, and sixth in team history.

Despite several strong seasons since their return to WFA, the Passion were moved down to the WFA's second division for the 2019 season.

The 2020 season of the Women's Football Alliance was cancelled in its entirety due to health and safety concerns in regard to the COVID-19 pandemic. The Passion would remain on hiatus through the 2021 WFA season before returning to play in 2022, once again in WFA's Pro Division.

During the 2023 WFA playoffs, the league announced that the WFA National Championship Trophies would be named for Passion co-owner Franco Harris, who had died the previous December.

The Passion finished the 2024 season with a 6-0 record, the sixth unbeaten season in team history and first since 2015. Despite this strong season, the Passion lost to the Boston Renegades in the National Conference Championship Game, 41-0. Passion quarterback Marcelina Chavez was named Most Valuable Player of the National Conference, with Teresa Conn named WFA Coach of the Year.

The Passion reached their second consecutive National Conference Championship Game, losing to the DC Divas, 35-34. Passion wide receiver Jana Meister and safety Danasha Harris were named the National Conference Offensive and Defensive Players of the Year, respectively. During the 2025 Championship Weekend, the Passion won the inaugural WFA Flag National Championship, defeating the Cali War, 26-14, earning a $10,000 cash prize and an automatic bid to the USA Flag National Tournament.

In 2026, the Passion would win their first WFA National Conference Championship, defeating the DC Divas 35-23. Pittsburgh would lose in the WFA Pro National Championship Game to the Minnesota Vixen, 42-14. Running back/wide receiver Ellisyn Knapo was named National Conference Offensive Player of the Year, the second consecutive season a Passion player earned the award. Co-head coach Lisa Horton was named the 2026 National Conference Player of the Year.

== Notable achievements ==
- First women's football franchise in history to broadcast games on a major television network (Fox Sports Net)
- First franchise to be featured in Sports Illustrated
- First franchise to be featured on ESPN
- Awarded a permanent fixture in the Heinz History Center's Western Pennsylvania Sports Museum in association with the Smithsonian Institution.
- Won the Dapper Dan Charities Sportswoman of the Year Award for 2011.
- Franchise was selected to host the WFA National Championship Game slated for August 4 in Pittsburgh.
- The W Bowl National Championship weekend, hosted by the Women's Professional Sports Services, on July 21–23, 2016 in Pittsburgh, PA.

== Season-by-season ==
Season records
Season	W	L	T	Finish	Playoff results
National Women's Football Association (2003-07)
2003	2	6	0	4th Mid-Atlantic Division	--
2004	6	2	0	2nd North Mid-Atlantic	--
2005	5	3	0	9th North Division	--
2006	5	3	0	3rd North Central	--
2007	8	0	0	1st North Central	Won NWFA Championship (Columbus)
Independent Women's Football League (2008-10)
2008	8	0	0	1st East North Atlantic	Lost Eastern Conference Championship (Chicago)
2009	7	1	0	2nd East Mid Atlantic	Lost Eastern Conference Semifinal (D.C.)
2010	4	4	0	3rd East Northeast	--
Women's Football Alliance (2011-13)
2011	8	0	0	1st National Mid-Atlantic	Lost National Conference Quarterfinal (Chicago)
2012	7	1	0	2nd National Division 3	Lost National Conference Quarterfinal (D.C.)
2013	7	3	0	1st National Division 2	Lost National Conference First Round (Boston)
IWFL (2014-15)
2014	8	0	0	1st Mid Atlantic Division	Won IWFL Championship (Houston)
2015	8	0	0	1st Mid Atlantic Division	Won IWFL Championship (Utah)
WFA (2016-present)
2016	6	2	0	1st National Central North	Lost National Conference Semifinal (D.C.)
2017	7	2	0	3rd National Northeast	Lost National Conference Semifinal (Chicago)
2018	7	1	0	1st National Northeast	Lost National Conference Semifinal (Boston)
2019	7	3	0	1st National Northeast	Lost National Conference Final (Detroit)
2022	4	2	0	-	Lost National Conference Final (Boston)
2023	3	3	0	3rd National	Lost National Conference Semifinal (Alabama)
2024	6	0	0	1st National	Lost National Conference Final (Boston)
2025	5	1	0	1st National	Lost National Conference Final (DC)
2026	7	1	0	1st National	Lost National Championship Game (Minnesota)
Totals	150	50	0	(including playoffs)	

* = current standing

== Roster ==
Pittsburgh Passion Roster 2025
Quarterbacks: 11 Marcelina Chavez; 28 Emma Gurley; Running Backs: 4 Kierra Jackson; 10 Sarah Paladin; 20 Arielle Smith; 31 Qualin Pitts; 52 Devan Sanders; Tight Ends: 26 Lindsay Baughman; 35 Fanica Payne; 86 Kodie Johnson; Wide Receivers: 5 Melissa Hall; 22 Ellisyn Mularski; 40 Paije Bragg; 41 Angela Cardillo; 43 Davonna Jennings; 81 Bethany Meyer; 83 Lauryn Franklin; 89 Grace Dadzaa	Offensive Line: 29 Brandy Polinick; 57 Kylie Roebuck; 61 Nicki Kellogg; 62 Home Schreiber; 65 Jacqueline Cook; 73 Lauren Ferragonio; 87 Emalee Tunney; 90 Abigail Haynie; 97 Shantal Villalobos; Defensive Tackles: 24 Denise Taylor; 55 Teona Cash; 63 Paige Cox; 66 Kayla Bickerton; 70 Amanda Pearson; 71 Brandi Clyde; 75 Michelle Smiley; 77 Kaitlain Niedermeyer; 92 Valerie Blochberger; Defensive Ends: 44 Kellie Bell; 56 Tyra Grant; 98 Kimberly Zubovic; Linebackers: 20 Chelsea Zahn; 33 Katelyn Polenik; 45 Jennifer Bova; 54 Kayla Pierce; 58 Tia Montgomery; 79 Fawntema Willis; 80 Christina Garayua	Defensive Backs: 9 Rebecca Ehrgood; 12 Danasha Harris; 13 Angela Hayden; 15 Lakeitha Barrett; 18 Santana Ramsey; 25 Nikky Hartman; 30 Eveldora Wheeler; 31 Gennifer Washington; 37 Ashley Dicicco; 42 Richelle Nestler; Multiple Positions: 1 Courtney Smith (LB/RB); 19 Maddison Miller (K/LB); 23 Devon Peace (RB/S); 27 Alyssa George (DE/QB); 85 Jana C. Meister (RB/WR); 92 Dionjaleah Jones (DT/OL)

== Honors ==
=== Team ===
- League Championships (3)
  - National Women's Football Association (1): 2007
  - Independent Women's Football League (2): 2014, 2015
  - WFA Flag Championship (1): 2025
- Conference Championships (1)
  - NWFA Northern Conference Championship (1): 2007
  - WFA Pro National Conference Championship (1): 2026
- Division Championships (12)
  - NWFA (1): 2007
  - IWFL (3): 2008, 2014, 2015
  - WFA (8): 2011, 2013, 2016, 2018, 2019, 2024, 2025, 2026

=== Players ===
Award	Player Name	Season
WFA National Conference MVP	Marcelina Chavez	2024
WFA National Conference Offensive Player of the Year	Jana Meister	2025
WFA National Conference Offensive Player of the Year	Ellisyn Knapo	2026
WFA National Conference Defensive Player of the Year	Danasha Harris	2025

=== Coach ===
Award	Player Name	Season
WFA Coach of the Year	Teresa Conn	2024
WFA Coach of the Year	Lisa Horton	2026
