= Columbus Comets =

American women's football team

- Founded: 2003
- Folded: 2020
- League: NWFA (2003-2008); WFA (2009–2015); WFA Division 2 (2016–2019)
- Team history: Columbus Flames (2003); Columbus Comets (2004–2020)
- Based in: Grove City, Ohio
- Stadium: Grove City Christian School
- Colors: Black, Royal Blue, White
- Owner: HP Sports, INC.
- Head coach: Hank 'The Hammer' Patterson
- Championships: 0

The Columbus Comets were a women's professional American football team based in Columbus, Ohio. They played in the Women's Football Alliance. The Comets played in the National Women's Football Association from their inception in 2003 until 2008 (in 2003 they were known as the Columbus Flames). Their home games were played at Grove City Christian School in Grove City, Ohio.

== History ==
The Columbus Comets were founded as the Columbus Flames in 2003 as part of the National Women's Football Association. The founder was Donna Ford, but she sold the team for the second year and the team name was changed to the Comets by new owner Lori Davis.

In 2004, the Comets became the first Women's Professional Football team to play at an National Football League stadium, when they defeated the Cleveland Fusion at Cleveland Browns Stadium 20-7.

The team played in the 2007 NWFA Championship, but lost to the Pittsburgh Passion.

The team began playing their games at Grove City Christian School's Huffaker Community Sports Complex in 2008.

=== Move to the WFA ===
The team joined the Women's Football Alliance in 2009 following the disbanding of their previous league and long-time head coach Hank Patterson, purchased the team. The team made the WFA Championship in 2010, but lost to the Lone Star Mustangs 12-16, in their only loss of the season.

In 2016, the team dropped to WFA Division II and remained in the division until they folded following the cancelation of the 2020 season due to the COVID-19 pandemic.

== Season-by-season results ==
Season	League	Record	Div. Position	Playoffs
2003	NWFA	6-3	3rd (Northern Mid-Atlantic)	
2004	NWFA	7-3	2nd (Northern Great Lakes)	W Massachusetts; L Detroit
2005	NWFA	6-3	5th (Northern)	L Southwest Michigan
2006	NWFA	7-4	2nd (Northern North Central)	W West Michigan; W Pensacola; L D.C.
2007	NWFA	9-4	2nd (Southern North)	W Pensacola; W Chattanooga; W Oklahoma City; L Pittsburgh
2008	NWFA	7-3	1st (Northern Central)	W Fort Wayne; L Philadelphia
2009	WFA	9-1	1st (National Mid-Atlantic)	L West Michigan
2010	WFA	11-1	1st (National Mid-Atlantic)	W Baltimore; W Philadelphia; W St. Louis; L Lone Star
2011	WFA	5-3	3rd (National Mid-Atlantic)	
2012	WFA	2-6	3rd (National Mid-Atlantic)	
2013	WFA	6-5	3rd (National Mid-Atlantic)	W New York; L D.C.
2014	WFA	5-5	2nd (National Mid-Atlantic)	W Toledo; L D.C.
2015	WFA	2-6	3rd (National Mid-Atlantic)	
2016	WFA2	5-5	3rd (WFA2 National Northeast)	W Indy; L Philadelphia
2017	WFA2	4-4	4th (WFA2 National Northeast)	
2018	WFA2	6-2	3rd (WFA2 National Northeast)	W Philly; L New York
2019	WFA2	6-3	2nd (WFA2 National Northeast)	L Detroit
