= Cincinnati Sizzle =

Women's football team in Ohio, U.S.

- Founded: 2003
- League: United States Women's Football League
- Team history: NWFA (2005–2008); WFA (2009–2014); USWFL (2015–2016); WFA (2017–present)
- Based in: Cincinnati, Ohio
- Stadium: Woodward High School
- Colors: Purple, Orange, Gold
- Owner: Steven Sherman
- Head coach: Lamonte Springs
- Championships: 1

The Cincinnati Sizzle is a women's professional full-contact/tackle football team from Cincinnati, Ohio. The team was established in 2003, by former Cincinnati Bengals running back Ickey Woods. Steve Sherman is the current owner of the Cincinnati Sizzle, as of the 2018 season, with Michelle Terrell continues in her 15th year as general manager. The regular season spans from April to July. Currently the home games are played at Walnut Hills High School (Cincinnati).

The Sizzle played in the National Women's Football Association (NWFA) for 4 seasons 2005 to 2008. Later joined the Women's Football Alliance (WFA) in 2009 to 2014. In the 2013 WFA season the Cincinnati Sizzle made its first ever playoff appearance as a first-round wild-card match-up against the Pittsburgh Passion. By the 2014 season the Women's Football Alliance (WFA) had 63 teams across the United States making it the largest-ever women's tackle football league in the world.

In 2015, the Cincinnati Sizzle joined the United States Women's Football League (USWFL) formerly the Women's Spring Football League (WSFL) and won the semi-finals playoff rival game against West Virginia. In 2016, the Cincinnati Sizzle ranked no. 2 at the beginning of the post season and hosted their first ever semifinal playoff game against Memphis Tn Legacy at Woodward High School. The Cincinnati Sizzle beat the New England Nightmare 30-6 and claimed their first national title in the 2016 United States Women's Football League Championship Game played on Saturday, July 30, 2016, in Horn Lake, Mississippi. As of 2017, Cincinnati Sizzle plays in the Women's Football Alliance (WFA).

== Season-by-season ==
Season records
Season	W	L	T	Finish	Playoff results
Cincinnati Sizzle (NWFA)
2005	2	6	0	15th Northern	--
2006	3	5	0	2nd Northern Northwest	--
2007	0	8	0	4th Southern North	--
2008	4	4	0	3rd Southern East	--
Cincinnati Sizzle (WFA)
2009	1	7	0	5th National Mid-Atlantic	--
2010	0	8	0	4th National Central	--
2011	4	4	0	3rd National North Central	--
2012	0	8	0	3rd National North Central	--
2013	4	5	0	2nd National North Central	Lost National Conference Wild Card (Pittsburgh)
2014	0	8	0	3rd National Mideast	--
2017	3	0	0	North Atlantic Division	--
Cincinnati Sizzle (USWFL)
2015	3	4	0	3rd Northern	Won Freedom Bowl (West Virginia)
2016	8	1	0		Won League Semifinal (TN); Won USWFL Championship (New England)
Totals	31	68	0		

== 2016 ==
=== Season schedule ===
Date	Opponent	Home/Away	Result
April 30	West Virginia Wildfire	Home	W
May 7	Erie Illusion	Home	W
May 14	West Virginia Wildfire	Away	W
May 21	Bye	Bye	
June 4	Memphis Tn Legacy	Home	W
June 11	Southern Indiana Storm	Home	W
June 18	Erie Illusion	Away	W
June 25	Memphis Tn Legacy	Away	L

=== Post Season schedule ===
Date	Opponent	Home/Away	Result
July 16	BYE	Bye	
July 23	Memphis Tn Legacy	Home	W

=== Championship schedule ===
Date	Opponent	Home/Away	Result
July 30	New England Nightmare	Away	W 30-16

== 2017 ==
=== Season schedule ===
Date	Opponent	Home/Away	Result
April 1	Tennessee Train	Home	W 46-12
April 8	Music City Mizfits	Away	W 36-8
April 15	Bye	Bye	
April 22	Derby City Dynamite	Home	W 50-34
April 29	Flint City Riveters	Home	
May 6	Music City Mizfits	Home	
May 13	Bye	Bye	
May 20	Derby City Dynamite	Away	
May 27	Flint City Riveters	Away	
June 3	Huntsville Tigers	Away	W 1-0

=== Post Season schedule ===
Date	Opponent	Home/Away	Result
