= Women's Football Alliance =

American tackle football league

Women’s Football Alliance
- Current season, competition or edition: 2025 Women's Football Alliance Season
- Sport: Women's gridiron football
- Founded: 2009; 17 years ago
- First season: 2009
- No. of teams: 60 active
- Country: United States
- Most recent champions: Pro – Minnesota Vixen; Div. 2 – Baltimore Nighthawks; Flag – Tampa Bay Inferno
- Most titles: Boston (7 titles)
- Website: wfaprofootball.com

The Women's Football Alliance (WFA) is a semi-pro full-contact women's American football league in the United States. Founded in 2009, it is the largest 11-on-11 football league for women in the world, and the longest running active women's football league in the U.S. Since 2016, the league has operated with three competitive levels: Pro, Division 2, and Division 3. The league is owned and operated by Jeff King and Lisa Gibbons King of Exeter, California. Lisa King is also a wide receiver for the WFA's Cali War.

In addition to operating annual national championship seasons in the U.S., the league also operates the WFA International program, which organizes international competitions for its own Team United and Team World against each other and all-star teams from other nations. The program also supports international player exchanges and provides logistical support to women's tackle football leagues in Central and South America, Europe, and Africa.

== League history ==
The Women's Football Alliance was established in 2009 and began its inaugural season with 36 teams. Many of the teams were already established teams from other leagues such as Women's Professional Football League, Independent Women's Football League and National Women's Football Association, while others began their inaugural season of play in the WFA.

=== 2009 ===
The first season of play ended with a championship game, which was played in the rebuilding (post-Katrina) city of New Orleans, Louisiana and was hosted by the New Orleans Blaze. The game was between the St. Louis Slam (American Conference – St. Louis, MO) and the West Michigan Mayhem (National Conference – Kalamazoo, MI). St. Louis became the first WFA National Champions with a final game score of 21–14. Additionally, there was an International Game played between the Aguilas Regias of Monterrey, Mexico and the hosting team, New Orleans Blaze. The Blaze won this game 12–0.

=== 2010 ===
The WFA grew in the second year (2010) to have over 40 teams competing for the national championship. The national championship for the 2010 season was accompanied by the first All-American game. The term All-American is used by the WFA to represent the best players at all positions from all WFA teams. The teams were chosen partly based on statistics and partly based on the vote of head coaches. The All-American game was played just before the championship game in Las Vegas, Nevada and was hosted by the Las Vegas Showgirlz. The All-American game was won by the American Conference. The second championship in the WFA would again come down to the last few plays and have a score differential of only four points. The Lone Star Mustangs (American Conference – Dallas/Fort Worth) defeated the Columbus Comets (National Conference – Columbus, Ohio) to become the second National Champions of the WFA by a score of 16–12.

=== 2011 ===
As the Women's Football Alliance prepared for the 2011 season, they were scheduled to have over 60 teams playing across the United States. They again grew due in part to new teams starting and in part due to established teams moving in from other leagues, most notably the New York Sharks, D.C. Divas, Chicago Force, Dallas Diamonds, and Kansas City Tribe. In the 2011 WFA championship, which was held in Bedford, Texas, the Boston Militia defeated the San Diego Surge 34–19 to claim the title.

=== 2012 ===
The WFA opened the season with 64 teams. The 2012 WFA National Championship game took place at Heinz Field in Pittsburgh, Pennsylvania, home stadium of the NFL franchise Pittsburgh Steelers; it was the first women's football championship game to be played in an NFL stadium. After losing the title game in the previous season, the San Diego Surge returned to win the 2012 championship 40–36 over the Chicago Force.

=== 2013 ===
The WFA opened the season with 50 teams. Running back Whitney Zelee (Boston Militia) made headlines in 2013 by becoming the league's first player to surpass 2,000 rushing yards in a football season, setting a league record of 2,128 yards. After losing the title game in the previous season, the Chicago Force returned to win the 2013 championship over the Dallas Diamonds 81–34 at Balboa Stadium, San Diego, California.

=== 2014 ===
The WFA opened the season with 42 teams. The preseason was capped by the inaugural WFA International Bowl, in which the Mexican All-Stars defeated the Austin Outlaws in exhibition. The Boston Militia became the league's first two-time champion in 2014, winning 69–34 in a title rematch with the San Diego Surge at Lane Tech Stadium in Chicago, Illinois. During championship weekend, the league introduced a new mid-major bowl game: the Alliance Bowl. The Seattle Majestics of the American Conference faced the Indy Crash of the National Conference in a contest to "showcase of the depth of quality teams that exist in the Women's Football Alliance." The Indy Crash prevailed 26–12. This season was also notable for the introduction of Kenneth Massey Ratings into the league's playoffs system.

=== 2015 ===
The WFA opened the season with 40 teams, the fewest since the league was first established in 2009. The preseason concluded with the second WFA International Bowl Game Series, in which the Mexican All-Stars went 1–1, defeating the Tacoma Trauma before falling to the Seattle Majestics. On August 8, 2015, the D.C. Divas defeated the Dallas Elite 30–26 in the WFA National Championship game at Los Angeles (Calif.) Southwest College Stadium. The Central Cal War Angels beat the Atlanta Phoenix 28–8 in the Alliance Bowl, an invitational bowl game also held during championship weekend.

=== 2016 ===
WFA executives launched a new, tiered league structure consisting of three divisions, similar to that of NCAA Football. The league opened the season with 43 teams (11 in Division 1, 16 in Division 2, and 16 in Division 3). The WFA also announced the W Bowl as their new brand for the WFA National Championship game. With a 28–26 victory over the Dallas Elite, the D.C. Divas won the inaugural W Bowl and their second national championship in as many years. The St. Louis Slam downed the Tampa Bay Inferno 38–7 to claim the Division 2 championship. The Acadiana Zydeco defeated the Richmond Black Widows 20–18 in the Division 3 title game. All three games were played at Joe P. Michaela Stadium in Imperial, Pa.

Allison Cahill of the Boston Renegades reached a new milestone in sports by becoming the first quarterback to attain 100 victories playing exclusively in women's football leagues.

=== 2017 ===
The league expanded to 65 teams (15 in Division 1, 19 in Division 2, and 31 in Division 3). On July 22, the Dallas Elite claimed the Division 1 National Championship, dubbed W Bowl II, with a 31–21 outcome against the Boston Renegades at Highmark Stadium in Pittsburgh, Pennsylvania. The St. Louis Slam repeated as Division 2 champions after a rematch in the title game against Tampa Bay finished 42–15. The Arkansas Wildcats beat the Orlando Anarchy 42–26 to claim the Division 3 trophy.

=== 2018 ===
The league opened the season with 67 teams (9 in Division 1, 16 in Division 2, and 39 in Division 3). On July 28, the Boston Renegades won the Division 1 National Championship game 42–18 over the Los Angeles Warriors at Fifth Third Bank Stadium, Kennesaw State University in Kennesaw, Georgia. The game was broadcast on ESPN3. The New York Sharks claimed the Division 2 title with a 27–21 victory over the Minnesota Vixen. In a rematch of the 2017 Division 3 championship game, the Orlando Anarchy defeated the Arkansas Wildcats 46–0.

=== 2019 ===
The league opened with 62 teams (6 in Division 1, 18 in Division 2, and 38 in Division 3). The Boston Renegades repeated as league champions, matching the feat first accomplished by the D.C. Divas (2015, 2016). On July 13, Boston beat the Cali War 52–24 at the Colorado School of Mines in Golden, Colorado. The game was broadcast on ESPN3. The St. Louis Slam won their third Division 2 title in four years by downing the Detroit Dark Angels 34–0. The Orlando Anarchy made their third consecutive trip to the Division 3 championship game but fell to the Nevada Storm 62–45.

=== 2020 ===
The 2020 season of the Women's Football Alliance was cancelled in its entirety due to health and safety concerns in regards to the COVID-19 (Coronavirus) pandemic. Although regular season games were scheduled, none were played.

The WFA signed deals with Eleven Sports/FTF Next Sports Network to broadcast ten 'WFA Game of the Week' events and eight games from the 2019 season on its cable network, streaming channels and website. They also established partnerships with Secret, Xenith, Wilson, Glazier Clinics, and Florida State University Interdisciplinary Center for Athletic Coaching.

The WFA established the Women's Football Coaching Alliance (WFCA), and the 'WFA Gives Campaign'. The league also witnessed the release of two feature films focused on its players, "Born To Play," directed by Viridiana Lieberman, and "Open Field," directed by Kathy Kuras. "Born To Play" aired nationally on ESPN and internationally on ABC to widespread critical acclaim.

=== 2021 ===
In February, the WFA announced a five-year agreement with the Hall of Fame Resort and Entertainment Company for the league's championship games to be played at Tom Benson Hall of Fame Stadium at Hall of Fame Village in Canton, Ohio. The league resumed play after a 2020 season lost to global pandemic. Scheduling challenges and safety concerns necessitated a delayed start (May instead of April) and a shortened season (6 regular season games instead of 8). The 2021 season opened with 49 teams (7 in Division 1, 12 in Division 2, and 30 in Division 3). On July 24, the Boston Renegades collected their third consecutive league title with a 42–26 victory over the Minnesota Vixen. The Nevada Storm defeated the Detroit Dark Angels 42–18 to win the Division 2 title. The Derby City Dynamite claimed the Division 3 crown with a 30–20 victory over the Arizona Outkast. All three championship games and the 2021 All-American game were broadcast on Next Level Sports television channel and FTF Next streaming channel.

=== 2022 ===
Heading into the 2022 season, the WFA rebranded Division 1 as the Pro Division and labeled the level as "WFA Pro." The league started the season with 59 teams: 11 in the Pro Division, 12 in Division 2, and 27 in Division 3. The league also added a developmental level that launched with nine teams.

The league's championship games again took place at Tom Benson Hall of Fame Stadium at Hall of Fame Village in Canton, Ohio. On July 10, the Boston Renegades collected their fourth consecutive league title with a 32–12 victory over the Minnesota Vixen. On July 9, the Mile High Blaze defeated the Derby City Dynamite 21–20 to win the Division 2 title, and the Oklahoma City Lady Force claimed the Division 3 crown with a 25–0 victory over the Capital City Savages. The National Conference won the All-American Game 14–12.

For the first time, the WFA Pro National Championship Game was broadcast on ESPN2. AdeNation was the name sponsor for the championship game while Xenith sponsored the WFA All-American Game. The WFA also signed a multi-year licensing deal with Fathead and brought back "The Road To Canton" television show for a second season. The 2023 season began April 22 with 14 teams.

=== 2023 ===
Following the success of the 2022 WFA Pro Championship Game broadcast, WFA reached a deal to air the 2023 Pro Championship on ESPN2. The WFA began the 2023 season with 60 teams: 14 in the Pro Division, 16 in Division 2, 24 in Division 3, and 6 in the Developmental Division.

The regular season ran from April 22 to June 10, with the championship games played on July 22. The Boston Renegades defeated the St. Louis Slam in the WFA Pro National Championship Game 35-7 to win their fifth consecutive championship and seventh overall. In the Division 2 Championship, the New York Wolves defeated the Oklahoma City Lady Force 21-0 for their first championship, and the Division 3 Championship saw the West Palm Beach Coyotes handily beat the New Mexico Banitas 58-6.

The WFA Pro National Championship Game garnered 174,000 live viewers, leading to the WFA securing a primetime slot for the 2024 championship on ESPN2.

On July 7, the WFA announced the National Championship Trophies would be renamed in honor of the late Franco Harris, a co-owner of the Pittsburgh Passion and member of the Pro Football Hall of Fame, citing his contributions to the league and women's football.

=== 2024 ===
The 2024 WFA season saw an overall decrease in the number of teams, with 54 total: 14 in WFA Pro, 15 in Division 2, and 29 in Division 3. The regular season ran from April 27 to June 15, with most teams play 6 games over 8 weeks.

In the WFA Pro National Championship Game, the St. Louis Slam defeated the Boston Renegades, 30-27, ending the latter's streak of five straight championships. The Nebraska Pride won the Division 2 championship over the West Palm Beach Coyotes, 32-6, while the Cincinnati Cougars took the Division 3 title over the New Mexico Banitas, 48-26.

== Teams ==
=== WFA Pro ===
Team	Location	Founded	Joined	Head coach
National Conference
Alabama Fire	Birmingham, Alabama	2015	2023	Cedric Lane
Boston Renegades	Boston, Massachusetts	2015	2015	John Johnson
Cali War	Los Angeles, California	2018	2019	Jeff King
D.C. Divas	Washington, D.C.	2000	2011	Allysea Marfull
New York Wolves	New York, New York	2018	2019	Fabian Alesandro
Pittsburgh Passion	Pittsburgh, Pennsylvania	2002	2016	Teresa Conn
Tampa Bay Inferno	Tampa, Florida	2009	2010	Arlo Henderson
American Conference
Arlington Impact	Arlington, Texas	2011	2023	Jimmie Hughes
Dallas Elite Mustangs	Dallas, Texas	2014	2015	Kristian Scott
Houston Energy	Houston, Texas	2000	2019	Brian Wiggins
Mile High Blaze	Denver, Colorado	2013	2015	Rob Sandlin
Minnesota Vixen	St. Paul, Minnesota	1999	2017	Connor Jo Lewis
Nevada Storm	Reno, Nevada	2011	2019	Chris Garza
St. Louis Slam	St. Louis, Missouri	2003	2009	Quincy Davis

=== Division 2 ===
Team	Location	Founded	Joined	Head coach
National Conference
Atlanta Rage	Atlanta, Georgia	2022	2023	Blair Clark
Baltimore Nighthawks	Baltimore, Maryland	2007	2017	Mike Lynn
Capital City Savages	Lansing, Michigan	2017	2019	Andre Broach
Carolina Phoenix	Greensboro, North Carolina	2006	2017	Maria V. Ormond
Columbus Chaos	Columbus, Ohio	2021	2022	Mike Kandler
Derby City Dynamite	Louisville, Kentucky	2011	2012	Tracy Logan
Detroit Venom	Detroit, Michigan	2011	2012	Andre Harlon
Grand Rapids Tidal Waves	Grand Rapids, Michigan	2017	2018	Stacey Davis
Jacksonville Dixie Blues	Jacksonville, Florida	2001	2009	Michelle Robinson
Miami Fury	Miami, Florida	2000	2011	Raul Camaliche
Tri-State Warriors	New Brunswick, New Jersey	2021	2022	Rich Harrigan
West Palm Beach Coyotes	West Palm Beach, Florida	2019	2023	Paul Gonsalves
American Conference
Austin Outlaws	Austin, Texas	2001	2009	Jason Barlow
Nebraska Pride	Omaha, Nebraska	2023	2023	Nancy Javaux-Major
Oklahoma City Lady Force	Oklahoma City, Oklahoma	2014	2021	Leonard Bulock
Portland Fighting Shockwave	Portland, Oregon	2002	2013	TBD
Sun City Stealth	El Paso, Texas	2019	2021	Marcus Riley
Vegas NVaders	Las Vegas, Nevada	2023	2024	Erik Garcia

=== Division 3 ===
Region	Team	Location	Founded	Joined	Head coach
National Conference
Northeast Region	Connecticut Nightmare	Windsor, Connecticut	2009	2017	Bruce Haney
Northeast Region	Harrisburg Havoc	Harrisburg, Pennsylvania	2021	2022	Jeff Thomas
Northeast Region	Maine Mayhem	Portland, Maine	2015	2017	Bryant Oja
Northeast Region	New Hampshire Rebellion	Manchester, New Hampshire	2021	2022	Arasi Chau
Northeast Region	New York Knockout	Troy, New York	2012	2017	Lou Butts
Northeast Region	Upstate Lady Predators	Rochester, New York	2023	2024	Jessica Coluzzi
Southeast Region	Cincinnati Cougars	Cincinnati, Ohio	2022	2023	Izaah Burks Sr.
Southeast Region	East Tennessee Valkyrie	Elizabethton, Tennessee	2021	2022	Shannon Simpson
Southeast Region	Music City Mizfits	Nashville, Tennessee	2016	2017	Donald Ragsdale
Southeast Region	Orlando Anarchy	Orlando, Florida	2009	2010	Sherman Harlow
Southeast Region	Raleigh Express	Raleigh, North Carolina	2022	2023	Brent Fisher
Southeast Region	Richmond Black Widows	Richmond, Virginia	2015	2016	Steve Baxter
Southeast Region	Virginia Panthers	Williamsburg, Virginia	2022	2023	James Lancaster
American Conference
Midwest Region	Cedar Raptors	Cedar Rapids, Iowa	2023	2024	Quinton Ray
Midwest Region	Iowa Phoenix	Des Moines, Iowa	2018	2019	Ricky Jimenez-Dragoni
Midwest Region	Midwest Mountain Lions	Waukegan, Illinois	2019	2022	Jahamal Hardy
Midwest Region	Minnesota Minx	Minneapolis, Minnesota	2021	2022	Grand Palmer
Midwest Region	Oklahoma Rage	Tulsa, Oklahoma	2022	2023	Tarrion Adams
Midwest Region	Sioux Falls Snow Leopards	Sioux Falls, South Dakota	2021	2021	Riley Key
Midwest Region	Zydeco Spice	Lafayette, Louisiana	2009	2010	Josh Edison
Pacific Region	Arizona Outkast	Phoenix, Arizona	2011	2019	TBD
Pacific Region	Capital Pioneers	Salem, Oregon	2019	2021	TBD
Pacific Region	Central Valley Chaos	Bakersfield, California	2021	2023	Andrew Blanton
Pacific Region	New Mexico Banitas	Las Cruces, New Mexico	2022	2023	Brian Bartlett
Pacific Region	Oregon Cougars	Eugene, Oregon	2021	2022	Chuck Hoffman
Pacific Region	Rocky Mountain Thunderkatz	Colorado Springs, Colorado	2012	2017	Demareo Pruitt
Pacific Region	Wasatch Warriors	Salt Lake City, Utah	2019	2023	Abel Tenorio

=== Developmental ===
Team	Location	Founded	Joined	Head coach
Florida Legacy	Fort Myers, Florida	2023	2024	Madison Schmatz

== WFA Pro Championship Game results ==
Year	Winner	Loser	Score
2009	St. Louis Slam	West Michigan Mayhem	21–14
2010	Lone Star Mustangs	Columbus Comets	16–12
2011	Boston Militia	San Diego Surge	34–19
2012	San Diego Surge	Chicago Force	40–36
2013	Chicago Force	Dallas Diamonds	81–34
2014	Boston Militia	San Diego Surge	69–34
2015	D.C. Divas	Dallas Elite	30–26
2016	D.C. Divas	Dallas Elite	28–26
2017	Dallas Elite	Boston Renegades	31–21
2018	Boston Renegades	Los Angeles Warriors	42–18
2019	Boston Renegades	Cali War	52–24
2020	Season cancelled due to the COVID-19 pandemic		
2021	Boston Renegades	Minnesota Vixen	42–26
2022	Boston Renegades	Minnesota Vixen	32–12
2023	Boston Renegades	St. Louis Slam	35–7
2024	St. Louis Slam	Boston Renegades	30–27
2025	St. Louis Slam	D.C. Divas	26–14
2026	Minnesota Vixen	Pittsburgh Passion	42–14

== WFA Division II Championship Game results ==
Year	Winner	Loser	Score
2016	St. Louis Slam	Tampa Bay Inferno	38–7
2017	St. Louis Slam	Tampa Bay Inferno	42–15
2018	New York Sharks	Minnesota Vixen	27–21
2019	St. Louis Slam	Detroit Dark Angels	34–0
2020	Season cancelled due to the COVID-19 pandemic		
2021	Nevada Storm	Detroit Dark Angels	42–18
2022	Mile High Blaze	Derby City Dynamite	21–20
2023	New York Wolves	Oklahoma City Lady Force	21–0
2024	Nebraska Pride	West Palm Beach Coyotes	32–6
2025	Salt Lake Wildcats	Baltimore Nighthawks	19–0
2026	Baltimore Nighthawks	Oklahoma City Lady Force	22–20

== WFA Division III Championship Game results ==
Year	Winner	Loser	Score
2016	Acadiana Zydeco	Richmond Black Widows	20–18
2017	Arkansas Wildcats	Orlando Anarchy	42–26
2018	Orlando Anarchy	Arkansas Wildcats	46–0
2019	Nevada Storm	Orlando Anarchy	62–45
2020	Season cancelled due to the COVID-19 pandemic		
2021	Derby City Dynamite	Arizona Outkast	30–20
2022	Oklahoma City Lady Force	Capital City Savages	25–0
2023	West Palm Beach Coyotes	New Mexico Banitas	58–6
2024	Cincinnati Cougars	New Mexico Banitas	48–26
2025	Richmond Black Widows	Oklahoma Rage	25–7

== WFA Flag Championship Game results ==
Year	Winner	Loser	Score
2025	Pittsburgh Passion	Cali War	26–14
2026	Tampa Bay Inferno	Philadelphia Phantomz	33–19

== Alliance Bowl results ==
Year	Winner	Loser	Score
2014	Indy Crash	Seattle Majestics	26–12
2015	Central Cal War Angels	Atlanta Phoenix	28–8

== Alliance Bowl Midwest Region results ==
Year	Winner	Loser	Score
2015	Houston Power	Acadiana Zydeco	9–6

== See also ==
- American football in the United States
- List of female American football players
- List of leagues of American football
  - United States Women's Football League
  - Women's National Football Conference
  - X League
- Women's football in the United States
- Women's sports in the United States
