= Orlando Anarchy =

Women's American football team

- Founded: 2010
- League: Women's Football Alliance
- Team history: Central Florida Anarchy (2010); Orlando Anarchy (2011-present)
- Based in: Orlando, Florida
- Stadium: Lake Howell High School
- Colors: Black, green, silver, white
- Head coach: Britney Stinson
- Championships: 2

The Orlando Anarchy are a women's American football team based in the Orlando metropolitan area. They currently play in the Women's Football Alliance. They play their home games at Lake Howell High School in the city of Winter Park, FL.

The team was founded in 2010 as the Central Florida Anarchy, starting play in the first year of the WFA. They filled a void in women's football in Orlando left by the demise of the Independent Women's Football League's Orlando Mayhem.

After many seasons of struggling the Orlando Anarchy became the 2017 WFA Tier III National Conference Champions. The Orlando Anarchy made it to the WFA Bowl Weekend in Pittsburgh, PA in 2017. They were defeated in the Tier III Championship game by the Arkansas Wildcats.

The Orlando Anarchy's 2023 roster boasted several All-Americans.

== Season-by-season ==
Season records
Season	W	L	T	Finish	Playoff results
Central Florida Anarchy (WFA)
2010	4	4	0	2nd National South Central	Lost NC Quarterfinal (Jacksonville)
Orlando Anarchy (WFA)
2011	5	3	0	2nd National South Atlantic	--
2012	1	2	0	3rd WFA National 9	--
2013	0	8	0		--
2014	1	7	0		--
2015	0	8	0	Season not completed due to injuries	--
2016	0	8	0		--
2017*	8	3	0	2017 WFA Tier III National Conference Champions	Lost in WBOWL Tier III Championship Game (Arkansas Wildcats)
2018	11	1	0	2018 WFA Tier III National Conference Champions	Won in WBOWL Tier III Championship Game (Arkansas Wildcats)
2019	9	2	0	2019 WFA Tier III National Conference Champions	Lost in WBOWL Tier III Championship Game (Nevada Storm)
2020	0	0	0	2020 season cancelled due to Covid	
2021	2	4	0		
2022	4	1	0		
2023	5	1	0		
Totals	50	52	0	(including playoffs)	

* = Current standing

== 2010 ==
=== Season schedule ===
Date	Opponent	Home/Away	Result
April 10	Jacksonville Dixie Blues	Home	Lost 13-41
April 17	Jacksonville Dixie Blues	Away	Lost 7-29
April 24	Carolina Raging Wolves	Away	Won 35-14
May 8	Tampa Bay Pirates	Away	Won 14-0
May 15	Jacksonville Dixie Blues	Away	Lost 13-47
June 5	Carolina Raging Wolves	Home	Won 26-6
June 12	Tampa Bay Pirates	Home	Lost 9-14
June 19	Tampa Bay Pirates	Home	Won 19-0
June 26	Jacksonville Dixie Blues (Conference Quarterfinal)	Away	Lost 13-47

== 2011 ==
=== Standings ===
2011 South Atlantic Division
	W	L	T	PCT	PF	PA	DIV	GB	STK
y-Jacksonville Dixie Blues	8	0	0	1.000	328	70	4-0	---	W8
Orlando Anarchy	5	3	0	0.625	168	139	2-2	3.0	W3
Gulf Coast Riptide	3	5	0	0.375	174	216	0-4	5.0	W1

=== Season schedule ===
Date	Opponent	Home/Away	Result
April 2	Tampa Bay Pirates	Away	Lost 0-6
April 9	Savannah Sabers	Home	Won 36-14
April 16	Jacksonville Dixie Blues	Home	Lost 7-42
May 7	Gulf Coast Riptide	Home	Won 41-14
May 14	Jacksonville Dixie Blues	Away	Lost 0-49
June 4	Gulf Coast Riptide	Away	Won 26-14
June 11	Carolina Raging Wolves	Away	Won 30-0
June 18	Atlanta Heartbreakers	Home	Won 28-0

== 2012 ==
=== Season schedule ===
Date	Opponent	Home/Away	Result
April 14	Tampa Bay Inferno	Home	Lost 25-0
April 21	Jacksonville Dixie Blues	Away	Lost 31-3
April 28	Miami Fury	Home	Won 34-8
May 12	Palm Beach Punishers	Away	Lost 14-13
May 19	Jacksonville Dixie Blues	Home	Lost 33-6
June 2	Savannah Sabers	Home	Lost 34-20
June 9	Tampa Bay Inferno	Away	Lost 42-20
June 16	Carolina Raging Wolves	Away	Won 41-8

== 2013 ==
=== Season schedule ===
Date	Opponent	Home/Away	Result
April 6	Miami Fury	Away	Lost 32-0
April 13	Tampa Bay Inferno	Home	Lost 34-14
April 20	Jacksonville Dixie Blues	Home	Lost 48-13
April 27	Tampa Bay Inferno	Away	Lost 60-7
May 4	Miami Fury	Home	Lost 52-0
May 18	Jacksonville Dixie Blues	Away	Lost 39-0
May 25	Tallahassee Jewels	Away	Lost 47-20
June 1	Miami Fury	Away	Lost 46-0

== 2014 ==
=== Season schedule ===
Date	Opponent	Home/Away	Result
April 5	Miami Fury	Away	Lost 56-0
April 19	Daytona Breakers	Home	Lost 32-13
April 26	Tampa Bay Inferno	Home	Lost 68-0
May 3	Savannah Sabers	Away	Won 20-14
May 10	Miami Fury	Home	Lost 41-0
May 17	Tampa Bay Inferno	Away	Lost 57-0
May 31	Jacksonville Dixie Blues	Away	Lost 48-7
June 7	Tennessee Train	Home	Lost 24-14

== 2015 ==
=== Season schedule ===
Date	Opponent	Home/Away	Result
April 18	Daytona Wave Runners	Away	Lost 22-6
April 25	Miami Fury	Away	Lost 42-0
May 2	Atlanta Phoenix	Home	Lost 1-0^
May 9	Jacksonville Dixie Blues	Away	Lost 1-0^
May 23	Jacksonville Dixie Blues	Home	Lost 1-0^
May 30	Miami Fury	Away	Lost 1-0^
June 6	Tampa Bay Inferno	Away	Lost 1-0^
June 13	Daytona Wave Runners	Home	Lost 1-0^

^ = Forfeit

== 2016 ==
=== Season schedule ===
Date	Opponent	Home/Away	Result
April 2	Jacksonville Dixie Blues	Away	Lost 56-0
April 16	Daytona Wave Runners	Home	Lost 29-0
April 23	Tampa Bay Inferno	Away	Lost 49-0
April 30	Jacksonville Dixie Blues	Away	Lost 56-7
May 7	Tampa Bay Inferno	Home	Lost 44-6
May 14	Daytona Wave Runners	Away	Lost 36-19
May 21	Jacksonville Dixie Blues	Home	Lost 47-0
June 4	Daytona Wave Runners	Home	Lost 28-7

== 2017 ==
=== Season schedule ===
Date	Opponent	Home/Away	Result
April 1	Daytona Wave Runners	Away	Won 37-0
April 8	Central Florida Shine	Home	Won 1-0^
April 15	North Florida Puma	Away	Won 46-0
April 22	Central Florida Shine	Away	Won 1-0^
May 6	Jacksonville Dixie Blues	Home	Won 23-8
May 13	Daytona Wave Runners	Home	Won 1-0^
May 27	Miami Fury	Home	Lost 42-13
June 3	Tampa Bay Inferno	Away	Lost 52-3
June 17	Cincinnati Sizzle	Home Playoff	Won 57-6
July 8	Toledo Reign	Away Playoff	Won 27-20
July 21	Arkansas Wildcats	Away Championship	Lost 42-26

^ = Forfeit

== 2018 ==
=== Season schedule ===
Date	Opponent	Home/Away	Result
March 24	North Florida Puma	Away	Won 33-0
April 7	Daytona Wave Runners	Home	Won 55-0
April 21	Savannah Hurricanes	Home	Won 55-0
April 28	Tampa Bay Inferno	Away	Won 45-42
May 5	Savannah Hurricanes	Away	Won 70-0
May 19	Jacksonville Dixie Blues	Away	Won 35-28
May 26	Daytona Wave Runners	Away	Won 42-0
June 2	Miami Fury	Home	Won 40-6
June 9	Tampa Bay Inferno	Home	Lost 14-38
June 16	Derby City Dynamite	Home Playoff	Won 38-14
June 30	Mississippi Royality	Away Playoff	Won 61-20
July 27	Arkansas Wildcats	Away Championship	Won 46-0

== 2019 ==
=== Season schedule ===
Date	Opponent	Home/Away	Result
April 6	Jacksonville Dixie Blues	Home	Won 33-0
April 13	South Carolina Smash	Home	Won 48-6
April 20	Tampa Bay Inferno	Away	Won 38-36
April 27	Jacksonville Dixie Blues	Away	Won 81-0
May 11	Miami Fury	Home	Won 36-26
May 18	Daytona Waverunners	Away	Won 78-0
June 1	Miami Fury	Away	Won 46-13
June 8	Tampa Bay Inferno	Home	Lost 12-20
June 15	Derby City Dynamite	Home Playoff	Won 43-8
June 29	Columbus Vanguard	Home Playoff	Won 55-8
July 12	Nevada Storm	Away Championship	Lost 62-45

== 2020 ==
=== Season schedule ===
Date	Opponent	Home/Away	Result
2020	WFA Season	Canceled Due to Covid	

== 2021 ==
=== Season schedule ===
Date	Opponent	Home/Away	Result
May 1	Tampa Bay Inferno	Away	Lost
May 8	Miami Fury	Home	Lost 0-1^
May 22	Tampa Bay Inferno	Away	Lost 0-1^
May 29	Jacksonville Dixie Blues	Home	Lost
June 12	Miami Fury	Away	Won
June 19	Daytona Waverunners	Away	Won

^ = Forfeit

== 2022 ==
=== Season schedule ===
Date	Opponent	Home/Away	Result
April 16	Daytona Waverunners	Home	Won 52 - 6
April 23	Jacksonville Dixie Blues	Away	Won 18 - 14
April 30	Tampa Bay Inferno	Away	Lost 20- 42
May 7	North Carolina Fierce	Home	Won 48 - 0
May 21	Carolina Phoenix	Home	Cancelled
May 28	Daytona Waverunners	Away	Won 70 - 0

== 2023 ==
=== Season schedule ===
Date	Opponent	Home/Away	Result
April 23	Daytona Waverunners	Home	Won 54-0
April 29	Miami Fury	Away	Won 40-6
May 6	Jacksonville Dixie Blues	Away	Won 32-0
May 13	Daytona Waverunners	Away	Won 42-0
May 20	West Palm Beach Coyotes	Home	Won 36-26
June 3	West Palm Beach Coyotes	Away	Lost 20-40
