= Derby City Dynamite =

American football team in Kentucky

- Founded: 2011
- League: Women's Football Alliance
- Team history: Derby City Dynamite (2012–present)
- Based in: Louisville, Kentucky
- Stadium: John Hardin High School
- Colors: Black, Red, White
- President: TBanks
- Head coach: M.Suber
- Championships: 1 (2021)
- Mascot: Dynamite man

The Derby City Dynamite is a women's professional full-contact/tackle football team of the Women's Football Alliance that began play in 2012. Based in Louisville, Kentucky, the Dynamite's home venue is John Hardin High School in Elizabethtown.

== Season-by-season ==
Season records
Season	W	L	T	Finish	Playoff results
Derby City Dynamite (WFA)
2012	4	4	0	1st National North Central	–
2013	3	5	0	3rd National North Central	–
2014	4	6	0	2nd National Mideast	Lost National Conference Wild Card (West Michigan)
2015	0	8	0	5th National Great Lakes	–
2016	3	6	0	4th WFA2 National Southeast	–
Totals	14	29	0	(including playoffs)	

Season Statistics
Year	W	L	T	PCT	PF	PA	Home	Road	Conf	NonConf
2012	4	4	0	0.500	128	100	3–1–0	1–3–0	3–1–0	1–3–0
2013	3	5	0	0.375	136	238	2–2–0	1–3–0	3–5–0	0–0–0
2014	4	6	0	0.400	264	216	3–2–0	1–4–0	1–1–0	3–5–0
2015	0	8	0	0.000	50	247	0–4–0	0–4–0	0–8–0	0–0–0
2016	2	6	0	0.250	42	264	1–3–0	1–3–0	2–6–0	0–0–0

== 2012 ==
=== Season schedule ===
Date	Opponent	Home/Away	Result	Record
April 14	Indy Crash	Away	L 0–2	0–1
April 28	Cincinnati Sizzle	Away	W 6–0	1–1
May 5	Pittsburgh Force	Home	W 8–2	2–1
May 12	Indy Crash	Home	L 14–18	2–2
May 19	Toledo Reign	Home	W 20–18	3–2
June 2	Memphis Dynasty	Away	L 6–12	3–3
June 9	Toledo Reign	Away	L 22–32	3–4
June 16	Cincinnati Sizzle	Home	W 52–16	4–4

== 2013 ==
=== Season schedule ===
Date	Opponent	Home/Away	Result	Record
April 6	Indy Crash	Home	L 6–48	0–1
April 13	Cleveland Fusion	Away	L 0–44	0–2
April 20	Cincinnati Sizzle	Away	L 20–24	0–3
April 27	Cleveland Fusion	Home	L 0–40	0–4
May 11	Toledo Reign	Away	L 24–26	0–5
May 18	Cincinnati Sizzle	Home	W 58–56	1–5
June 1	Toledo Reign	Home	W 14–0	2–5
June 8	Tennessee Train	Away	W 14–0	3–5

== 2014 ==
=== Season schedule ===
Date	Opponent	Home/Away	Result	Record
April 5	Toledo Reign	Home	L 6–26	0–1
April 12	West Michigan Mayhem	Home	L 6–15	0–2
April 19	Columbus Comets	Away	L 0–42	0–3
April 26	Detroit Dark Angels	Away	L 22–52	0–4
May 10	Detroit Dark Angels	Home	W 22–20	1–4
May 17	Indy Crash	Away	L 0–19	1–5
May 24	Non-League Opponent	Home	W 72–0	2–5
May 31	Tennessee Train	Home	W 40–12	3–5
June 7	Cincinnati Sizzle	Away	W 74–0	4–5
Postseason
June 14	West Michigan Mayhem	Away	L 22–30	4–6

== 2015 ==
=== Season schedule ===
Date	Opponent	Home/Away	Result	Record
April 11	Atlanta Phoenix	Home	L 10–34	0–1
April 18	Indy Crash	Home	L 6–31	0–2
April 25	West Michigan Mayhem	Away	L 0–36	0–3
May 9	Detroit Dark Angels	Away	L 8–38	0–4
May 16	St. Louis Slam	Away	L 8–26	0–5
May 30	West Michigan Mayhem	Home	L 0–15	0–6
June 6	Detroit Dark Angels	Home	L 18–26	0–7
June 13	Indy Crash	Away	L 0–41	0–8

== 2016 ==
=== Season schedule ===
Date	Opponent	Home/Away	Result	Record
April 2	St. Louis Slam	Away	L 0–71	0–1
April 9	Atlanta Phoenix	Away	L 0–74	0–2
April 16	Alabama Fire	Home	L 8–38	0–3
April 23	Huntsville Tigers	Home	W 14–0	1–3
April 30	Toledo Reign	Home	L 6–12	1–4
May 14	St. Louis Slam	Home	L 6–23	1–5
May 21	Huntsville Tigers	Away	W 8–6	2–5
June 4	Alabama Fire	Away	L 0–40	2–6

== See also ==
- Sports in Louisville, Kentucky
