= Barracudas =

Barracudas may refer to:

- Barracuda, a large, predatory ray-finned fish

== Music ==
- The Barracudas, an English surf rock band

== Sport ==
- Birmingham Barracudas, a Canadian football team in Alabama
- Boston Barracudas, an English speedway team
- Brisbane Barracudas, an Australian water polo club
- Brunei Barracudas, a basketball team
- Burlington Barracudas, a women's ice hockey team in Ontario, Canada
- CenTex Barracudas, an indoor football team in Belton, Texas
- Emerald Coast Barracudas, a women's American football team in Panama City Beach, Florida
- Jacksonville Barracudas, an ice hockey team in Florida
- Long Beach Barracudas, a baseball team in California
- Pensacola Barracudas (arena football), an American football team in Florida
- Pensacola Barracudas (soccer), a soccer team in Florida
- San Diego Barracudas, an inline hockey team in California
