= Gulf Coast Riptide =

- Founded: 2001
- League: Women's Spring Football League
- Team history: Pensacola Power (NWFA) 2001–2008; Gulf Coast Riptide (WFA) 2009–2012; Gulf Coast Riptide (WSFL) 2012–present
- Based in: Pensacola, Florida
- Arena: Emmitt Smith Stadium, Escambia High School
- Colors: Navy, white
- Head coach: Mike Thomas
- Championships: 0
- Dancers: Riptide Cheerleaders

The Gulf Coast Riptide was a women's American football full contact football team in the Women's Spring Football League founded in 2001 as the Pensacola Power of the National Women's Football Association. The WFA plays under NFL rules with minor modifications such as ball size and kick off placement. Their home field was Escambia High School in West Pensacola. This team no longer plays.

== History ==
=== Pensacola Power ===
==== 2001 Season ====
The team's history started one cool Saturday morning in February 2001. That's when Catherine Masters (NWFA CEO & founder) held tryouts for the first women's football team in Pensacola. Ray Quinn (Head Coach & owner of the Alabama Renegades) and Tim Smart (Power Head Coach Candidate) were on hand to greet the first batch of football hopefuls. Over 120 women tried out for the team over the next three weekends but only 60 could make the squad. After a laborious selection process, 60 women were chosen and the team was ready to get started.

The Power had less than 2 months to select a team, get in shape, order equipment and learn the fundamentals of the game. Expectations for the first season were understandably moderate. With 4 games against teams from Nashville and Huntsville, (teams with 8 games under their belts) the Power was optimistically hoping for a 4–4 season.

The Power burst on the NWFA scene with a vengeance setting records for attendance ranging from a reported 2,500 to 5,000 fans per game. No one was disappointed. During the course of their first season the Power recorded the first ever undefeated regular season, earned the Southern Division Title with the 2nd ranked defense and the 2nd ranked offense in the league led by team captain and starting quarterback (Julie Moss), they had the leagues first and only 1,000 yard rusher (Jill Penderghest), the league leader in interceptions (Jodi Albright), the leagues’ best punter and field goal kicker (Emily Morgan) and earned a berth in the first ever National Women's Football Association National Championship game. While the Power lost the championship game to nerves and the overwhelming size and strength of the Philadelphia Liberty Belles, no one could have asked for a better start.

==== 2002 Season ====
The 2002 season began with concerns. After an 8-1 inaugural season and then management changes, the Power was given new management and ownership. Under new ownership, the Power prepared for the 2002 season. With about 25 returning veterans the Power had an existing core to build on. The NWFA had added another 10 teams to the league and had reorganized itself into five conferences. The Power was put in the new Gulf Coast Division with teams from Biloxi, Panama City and New Orleans. The Power used experience and power to beat divisional opponents and wrapped up its second consecutive undefeated season and divisional title. They outscored their opponents 421–19. They had the #1 rated offense and the #2 rated defense in the league. The Power defeated the Alabama Renegades 12–8 in the first round of the playoffs but fell to the eventual National Champion, the Detroit Danger by a score of 14–7. The Power have a 17-2 (.894 winning percentage) record over the last two years.

Unlike the 2001 season the 2002 season was a success on and off the field. With new management and solid financial controls the Power ended the year with zero debt and the ability to start the 2003 season with a small balance in the bank.

==== 2003 Season ====
Head Coach Tim Smart - who is a retired Air Force Officer currently coaching the 2006 champions (the D.C. Divas) receives orders and is unable to complete the season. The Power warms up with a home pre-season game against the Nashville Dream, winning 37–12. Coach Smart takes the Power to a regular season 7–0 record before he has to pack up. Coach Mike Thomas (defensive coordinator) takes over as head coach and the transition is smooth. Coach Thomas' first official game as head coach is a victory and seals up an incredible record of 8-0 for the season outscoring opponents 480–10. The Power is now undefeated in regular season play for the third consecutive year.

Entering the playoffs with an official Bye and home field advantage, the Power is ranked No. 1. The first match-up was against the Alabama Renegades. With a victory of 32–12, the Power advanced to play Oklahoma City Lightning. Again, the Power was successful with a victory of 26-14 and went on to the Championship in Nashville TN. Although the Power played a head to head game at Vanderbilt against the Detroit Demolition, Detroit made wise use of the clock and went on to win the Championship Title with a score of 28–21. The Power holds a record of 10-1 for the 2003 Season and are the reigning Gulf Coast Division Champions and Southern Conference Champions. For the 2003 season, the Power were rated #1 Defense and #2 Offense in the NWFA according to Massy Ratings. The franchise record stands at 27-3 (.894), not including pre-season scrimmages. The National Title has so far managed to slip out of their grasp, but the Power has without a doubt established themselves as a national contender.

==== 2004 Season ====
With Coach Mike Thomas leading the way, the Power saw some new competition, as their favorite rival the Alabama Renegades were shifted into a different division. Although the games were tougher as the competition gets more experienced, the Power had their 4th consecutive 8–0 regular season. New playoff rules put into place made the scenario such that you must beat each opponent by more than 30 points to ultimately gain the home field advantage. Teams who were given forfeits automatically were credited with a 30-point spread win. Although 8–0 and outscoring their opponents 398–57, the Power lost the home field advantage, was seeded #3 and had to travel for 2 out of 3 playoff games. The Power breezed their way through the first round defeating the Ashville Assault 61–0. The team met the always competitive Chattanooga Locomotion in the next round. This was the first time the two teams had met again since the 2001 season. The game began slowly with both teams showing some strengths and weaknesses but the Power opened things up in the second half and defeated the Locomotion 35–20. The final playoff game and Southern Conference Championship was against the Lightning in Oklahoma City. The Power was disappointed as they weren't able to take the team to the final game with a loss to OKC. The franchise record after this season is 36–4 (.894) not including pre-season scrimmages.

==== 2005 season ====
This time, riding another 8–0 season, the Power beat OKC in overtime earning a third appearance at the Championships. They traveled to Louisville, Kentucky to play the Detroit Demolition for the NWFA Championship but they were literally out of their league as they were overpowered by a painful 74–0 loss.

==== 2006 season ====
Limping home after their loss, the Power never quite recovered and suffered their first regular season loss in the franchise history to the Austin Outlaws. They ended the 2006 season 6-2 but still captured their Southeast Division Title. The Power were beaten by the Columbus Comets in the 2nd round of playoffs to end their 2006 season.

==== 2007 season ====
Despite capturing a 7–1 record and another Southeast Division Title, the Power were eliminated in the first round of the playoffs by the Columbus Comets once again.

==== 2008 season ====
Once again, the Power finished 6-2 and won the Southeast Division championship. Likewise, the Power were eliminated in the first round, losing 6–0 to the Kentucky Karma.

=== Gulf Coast Riptide ===
==== 2009 season ====
For the 2009 season, the Power moved to the Women's Football Alliance and changed their name to the Gulf Coast Riptide. Despite another well-played season and another 6–2 record, for the first time in franchise history, the Riptide missed the playoffs. This is because of the WFA's new playoff system which did not allow for any wildcards from the American Conference and because of the Riptide's two losses to the Jacksonville Dixie Blues.

==== 2010 season ====
The Riptide took the 2010 season off to reorganize.

==== 2011 season ====
The 2011 season continued the downfall of their previous season. For only the second time in team history, the Riptide failed to win the division title or play any postseason games; also for the first time in team history, the team finished with a losing record at 3–5.

== Season-by-season ==
Season records
Season	W	L	T	Finish	Playoff results
Pensacola Power (NWFA)
2001	8	0	0	1st Unknown Division	Lost NWFA Championship (Philadelphia)
2002	8	0	0	1st Gulf Coast	Won First Round (Alabama); Lost Semifinal (Detroit)
2003	8	0	0	1st South	First-round bye Won Conference Semifinal (Alabama); Won Conference Championship (Oklahoma City); Lost NWFA Championship (Detroit)
2004	8	0	0	1st South Gulf Coast	Won Southern Conference Quarterfinal (Asheville); Won Southern Conference Semifinal (Chattanooga); Lost Southern Conference Championship (Oklahoma City)
2005	8	0	0	T-1st South	Won South Division Semifinal (Chattanooga); Won South Division Championship (Oklahoma City); Lost NWFA Championship (Detroit)
2006	6	2	0	1st South East	First-round bye Lost NWFA Quarterfinal (Columbus)
2007	7	1	0	1st South South	Lost Southern Conference Quarterfinal (Columbus)
2008	6	2	0	1st South Southeast	Lost Southern Conference Quarterfinal (Kentucky)
Gulf Coast Riptide (WFA)
2009	6	2	0	2nd American Southeast	--
2010	Did not play				
2011	3	5	0	3rd South Atlantic	--
2012*	1	3	0	3rd WFA National 8	--
Totals	76	23	0	(including playoffs)	

* = current standing

Pensacola Power (2001–2008)

Preliminary Gulf Coast Riptide logo (pre-2009)

Former Gulf Coast Riptide logo (2009)

New Gulf Coast Riptide logo (2011–present)

== 2009 ==
=== Season schedule ===
Date	Opponent	Home/Away	Result
April 25	New Orleans Blaze	Home	Won 28–0
May 2	Emerald Coast Barracudas	Away	Won 66–8
May 9	New Orleans Blaze	Away	Won 20–10
May 16	Memphis Belles	Home	Won 55–8
May 30	Jacksonville Dixie Blues	Home	Lost 36–49
June 13	Memphis Belles	Away	Won 54–20
June 20	Emerald Coast Barracudas	Home	Won 6–0**
June 27	Jacksonville Dixie Blues	Away	Lost 14–37

== 2011 ==
=== Standings ===
2011 South Atlantic Division
	W	L	T	PCT	PF	PA	DIV	GB	STK
y-Jacksonville Dixie Blues	8	0	0	1.000	328	70	4-0	---	W8
Orlando Anarchy	5	3	0	0.625	168	139	2-2	3.0	W3
Gulf Coast Riptide	3	5	0	0.375	174	216	0-4	5.0	W1

=== Season schedule ===
Date	Opponent	Home/Away	Result
April 2	Atlanta Heartbreakers	Away	Won 64–6
April 9	Miami Fury	Away	Lost 14–52
April 30	Jacksonville Dixie Blues	Home	Lost 14–21
May 7	Central Florida Anarchy	Away	Lost 14–41
May 14	Tampa Bay Pirates	Home	Won 18–13
May 21	Jacksonville Dixie Blues	Away	Lost 0-43
June 4	Central Florida Anarchy	Home	Lost 14–26
June 18	Carolina Raging Wolves	Home	Won 36–14

== 2012 ==
=== Season schedule ===
Date	Opponent	Home/Away	Result
April 14	New Orleans Blaze	Home	
April 21	Acadiana Zydeco	Away	
May 5	Tallahassee Jewels	Home	
May 12	Acadiana Zydeco	Home	
May 19	Tallahassee Jewels	Away	
June 2	Atlanta Phoenix	Away	
June 9	Miami Fury	Home	
June 16	New Orleans Blaze	Home	

** = Won by forfeit
