= Louisville Belles =

- Founded: 2008
- League: IWFL (2009–2010); WSFL (2011–present)
- Team history: Louisville Nightmare (2009–2010); Louisville Belles (2011–present)
- Based in: Louisville, Kentucky
- Stadium: Ballard High School
- Colors: Red, silver
- President: Mary Clark
- Championships: 0

The Louisville Belles are a team of the Women's Spring Football League based in Louisville, Kentucky. Home games are played at the campuses of Seneca High School and Ballard High School.

During their first two seasons, the Belles were known as the Louisville Nightmare and played in the Independent Women's Football League.

== Season-by-season ==
Season records
| Season | W | L | T | Finish | Playoff results |
|---|---|---|---|---|---|
Louisville Nightmare (IWFL)
| 2009 | 0 | 8 | 0 | 26th Tier II | -- |
| 2010 | 0 | 7 | 0 | 6th Tier II West Midwest | -- |
Louisville Belles (WSFL)
| 2011 | -- | -- | -- | -- | -- |
| Totals | 0 | 15 | 0 | | |

== Season schedules ==
=== 2009 ===
| Date | Opponent | Home/Away | Result |
|---|---|---|---|
| April 11 | Carolina Phoenix | Away | Lost 7-32 |
| April 25 | Clarksville Fox | Away | Lost 7-37 |
| May 9 | Carolina Queens | Home | Lost 0–2** |
| May 16 | Tennessee Valley Tigers | Away | Lost 0-53 |
| May 23 | Cape Fear Thunder | Home | Lost 14–34 |
| May 30 | Tennessee Valley Tigers | Home | Lost 0-54 |
| June 6 | Clarksville Fox | Home | Lost 0–12 |
| June 13 | Chattanooga Locomotion | Away | Lost 0–2** |

** = Forfeited

=== 2010 ===
| Date | Opponent | Home/Away | Result |
|---|---|---|---|
| April 3 | Memphis Belles | Home | Lost 0–2** |
| April 17 | Clarksville Fox | Home | Lost 0–2** |
| April 24 | Carolina Phoenix | Home | Lost 0-58 |
| May 8 | Erie Illusion | Away | Lost 8-47 |
| May 15 | Clarksville Fox | Away | Lost 0-40 |
| May 22 | Tennessee Valley Tigers | Home | Lost 0–1** |
| May 29 | Tennessee Valley Tigers | Away | Lost 8-25 |

** = Forfeited
