= Dallas Rage =

Dallas Rage logo

The Dallas Rage was an expansion team in the National Women's Football Association.

In its 2005 inaugural season, the Dallas Rage compiled a 6–2 regular season record including an upset defeat of the previously undefeated Oklahoma City Lightning. The Dallas Rage made it to the first round of playoffs in their first season, losing 14–16 to the Chattanooga Locomotion.

In 2006, the team compiled only a 4–4 regular season record but featured the league's leading passer (Jennifer Hull) and leading sacker (Twyla Smith), who were both nominated as finalists for the league's overall offensive and defensive MVPs, respectively.

In 2007, the team amassed a 2–6 record but shut down before completing the 2007 regular season.

In 2008, the Dallas Rage became the North Texas Fury and played in the National Women's Football Association. The North Texas Fury organization completed the 2008 season, but then ceased to exist. Many of the core players from the North Texas Fury then became a part of a new organization known as the Lone Star Mustangs. The Lone Star Mustangs play in the Women's Football Alliance.

== Season-By-Season ==
Season records
Season	W	L	T	Finish	Playoff results
Dallas Rage (NWFA)
2005	6	3	0	5th Southern	Lost Southern Conference Quarterfinal (Chattanooga)
2006	4	4	0	3rd Southern Southwest	--
2007	2	6	0	3rd Southern West	--
North Texas Fury (NWFA)
2008	1	6	1	4th Southern Central	--
Totals	13	19	1	(including playoffs)	
