= Miami Fury =

US Women's Football Alliance team

- Founded: 2000
- League: WPFL (2000–2001); IWFL (2003–2010); WFA (2011–present)
- Team history: Miami Fury (2000–present)
- Based in: Miami, Florida
- Stadium: North Miami Athletic Stadium
- Colors: Aqua, orange, white, black
- Owner: Gayla Harrington
- Head coach: Thomas Fanakos
- Championships: 0

The Miami Fury are a football team in the Women's Football Alliance. Based in Miami, Florida, the Fury play their home games at Carter Park.

== History ==
=== 2000 ===
The Fury were formed as a charter member of the Women's Professional Football League when they started full-league play in 2000 (previously, it had just been a barnstorming venture between the Lake Michigan Minx and the Minnesota Vixen). The Fury were placed in the National Conference South Division alongside their in-state rivals the Daytona Beach Barracudas and the Tampa Tempest. In their inaugural season, the Fury finished with a 3–4 record, in-between the undefeated Barracudas (6–0) and the winless Tempest (0–6).

=== 2001 ===
2001 was a much better year for the Fury, as the team started with a 3–1 record. However, due to the September 11 attacks, the remainder of the regular season was cancelled, and despite four forfeit wins in the Fury's favor, they did not get a chance to compete for the Championship. The official record books show 7–1 as the Fury's final record.

=== 2002 ===
The Fury took the year off to reorganize and get ready for their move to the Independent Women's Football League.

=== 2003 ===
In their first season in the IWFL, the Fury finished with a 5–1 record which was good for the Eastern Conference South Atlantic Division title, finishing ahead of their rivals the Tampa Bay Terminators and Orlando Starz. However, for undetermined reasons, the Fury forfeited their first-round playoff game to the Bay State Warriors.

=== 2004 & 2005: The X-Team Years ===
In 2004 and 2005, the Fury played as an IWFL exhibition team ("X-Team"). Not much is known about their time in the X-Team circuit.

=== 2006 ===
2006 marked the Fury's return to full-time seasonal play. They picked up right where they left off, finishing with a 7–1 record good for second place in the South Atlantic Division. Their playoff run would end soon after it began after a 14–8 loss to their old WPFL rivals the New York Sharks in the first round.

=== 2007 ===
The Fury finished third place in the South Atlantic Division with a 3–5 record.

=== 2008 ===
Once again, the Fury finished third place in the South Atlantic Division with a 3–5 record.

=== 2009 ===
Yet again, the Fury finished third place in the South Atlantic Division, only this time with a 6–2 record.

=== 2010 ===
For the fourth consecutive season, the Fury finished third place in the Southeast Division, with a 5–3 record this time around.

=== 2011 ===
For the 2011 season, the Fury joined the Women's Football Alliance, joining the Jacksonville Dixie Blues, Gulf Coast Riptide, Orlando Anarchy, and Tampa Bay Pirates as teams representing the Sunshine State. Also, longtime IWFL rival the Palm Beach Punishers made the move to the WFA.

That season proved to be a return to their dominant ways, winning the Coastal Division title with a 7–1 record (their first title since 2003) and reaching the playoffs for the first time since 2006. However, their playoff run was as short-lived as before, losing to the Jacksonville Dixie Blues in the first round by a score of 20–18.

=== 2018 ===
Posted on April 7, 2018, The Miami Fury kickoff its first game of the season on April 14. The first game was on the road in Tampa, Florida,. This year the team was able to bring back the majority of its veteran players while adding a few new rookies to the roster.

Dwyer Stacy 3 Fort Lauderdale, FL----- White Sherry 4 Fort Lauderdale, FL---- Cortes Jennifer 5 Miami, FL---- Wilson Lacharmer 6 Miami, FL---- Childers Jessica 7 Hallandale, FL---- Greeg Keondra 11 Miami, FL---- Matthews Jordean 13 Pleasantville, NJ---- Ballard Natrasha 15 Miami, FL---- Cofield Ternisha 19 Miami, FL---- Lee Courtney 20 Deerfield Beach, FL---- Villar Jenecil 21 Miami Springs, FL---- Frye Nadia 23 Loxahatchee, FL---- Sumlin Dianna 25 Fort Lauderdale, FL---- Swain Erica 28 Fort Lauderdale, FL---- Baptiste Sabrina 31 North Miami, FL---- Bernard Sasha 34 Delray Beach, FL---- Watson Alessandra 40 Miami, FL---- Brent-Harris Dionne 45 Miramar, FL---- Sharpe Quisqueya 60 Miami, FL---- Montanez Jessica 61 Miramar, FL---- Cardova Blanca 64 Miami, FL---- Haywood Michelle 65 Pembroke Pines, FL---- Wright Nicole 75 Miami, FL---- Johnson Brittani 44 Fort Lauderdale, FL---- Rogers Danitra 92 Miami, FL---- McDonald Keisha 95 Miami, FL----

== Season-By-Season ==
Season records
Season	W	L	T	Finish	Playoff results
Miami Fury (WPFL)
2000	3	4	0	2nd NC South	--
2001	7	1	0	1st NC South	Playoffs Cancelled due to September 11 attacks
2002	Did not play				
Miami Fury (IWFL)
2003	5	1	0	1st EC South Atlantic	Forfeited Divisional Playoffs (Bay State)
2004	X-Team: Results Unknown/Not Counted				
2005	X-Team: Results Unknown/Not Counted				
2006	7	1	0	2nd EC South Atlantic	Lost EC First Round (New York)
2007	3	5	0	3rd EC South Atlantic	--
2008	3	5	0	3rd EC South Atlantic	--
2009	6	2	0	3rd EC South Atlantic	--
2010	5	3	0	3rd EC Southeast	--
Miami Fury (WFA)
2011	7	1	0	1st NC Coastal	Lost National Conference Quarterfinal (Jacksonville)
2012	0	8	0	5th National Division 9	
Totals	46	34	0	(including playoffs, not including X-Team seasons)	

== 2011 roster ==
Miami Fury roster
Quarterbacks: 13 Deniele Barbosa; 7 Jessica Childers; Running backs: 4 Ke'Shia Miller; 21 Shirley Moise; 25 Ronkia Toombs; Wide receivers: 82 Terica Hill; 83 Lenora Harris	Offensive line: 60 Shamieka Melvin; 61 Jessica Montanez (C); 65 Tammy Carey; 69 Shawnee Sumpter; 77 Barbara Palmer; Defensive line: 67 Darlene Chatman (DE); 74 Carolina Levy (DT); 75 Kristina Williams (DT); 91 Jermerica Boykin (DE); 92 Danitra Rogers (DT); Linebackers: 1 Kalondra Mckenzie; 24 Priscila Freitas; 34 Allison Dunne; 38 Natrasha Ballard; 55 Tonian Malcolm; 95 Keisha McDonald	Defensive backs: 3 Stacy Dwyer; 20 Alexis Wilson; 31 Sabrina Baptiste (CB); 6 Lacharmer Wilson (CB); Special teams: 2 Claudia Apey (K); 6 Lacharmer Wilson (CB); Multiple Positions: 11 Keondra Greer (QB/DB); 7 Sharlene White (FB/QB); 40 Rebekah Gray (LB/TE); 71 Cheryl Walker (OL/DL)	Injured reserve: 2 Milagrito Cruz (DB); 9 Gayla Harrington (DE); Exempt List: currently vacant; Practice squad: currently vacant; rookies in italics; Roster updated June 20, 2011; 32 Active, 0 Inactive, 0 PS

== 2009 ==
=== Season schedule ===
Date	Opponent	Home/Away	Result
April 11	Orlando Mayhem	Away	Won 21–0
April 25	Palm Beach Punishers	Home	Won 44–0
May 2	Houston Energy	Away	Won 21–0
May 16	Orlando Mayhem	Home	Won 27–6
May 23	Atlanta Xplosion	Home	Lost 12–16
May 30	Dallas Diamonds	Away	Lost 8–41
June 6	Orlando Mayhem	Home	Won 18–0
June 13	Palm Beach Punishers	Away	Won 53–0

== 2010 ==
=== Season schedule ===
Date	Opponent	Home/Away	Result
April 3	Palm Beach Punishers	Away	Won 40–9
April 17	H-Town Texas Cyclones	Home	Won 2–0**
April 24	Atlanta Xplosion	Away	Lost 0–39
May 2	Palm Beach Punishers	Home	Won 41–0
May 8	Houston Energy	Away	Lost 0–1***
May 16	Palm Beach Punishers	Home	Won 55–0
May 30	Atlanta Xplosion	Home	Lost 0–1***
June 5	Palm Beach Punishers	Away	Won 14–6

** = Won by forfeit *** = Forfeited

== 2011 ==
=== Standings ===
2011 Coastal Division
	W	L	T	PCT	PF	PA	DIV	GB	STK
y-Miami Fury	7	1	0	0.875	302	89	4-0	---	W1
Palm Beach Punishers	5	3	0	0.625	164	96	2-2	2.0	L1
Tampa Bay Pirates	2	6	0	0.250	95	160	0-4	5.0	L6

=== Season schedule ===
Date	Opponent	Home/Away	Result
April 2	Carolina Raging Wolves	Home	Won 62–0
April 9	Gulf Coast Riptide	Home	Won 52–14
April 16	Atlanta Heartbreakers	Away	Won 72–0
April 30	Tampa Bay Pirates	Away	Won 32–0
May 14	Palm Beach Punishers	Home	Won 12–9
May 21	Tampa Bay Pirates	Home	Won 34–21
June 11	Jacksonville Dixie Blues	Away	Lost 24–45
June 18	Palm Beach Punishers	Away	Won 14–0
June 25	Jacksonville Dixie Blues (National Conference Quarterfinal)	Away	Lost 18–20

== 2012 ==
=== Season schedule ===
Date	Opponent	Home/Away	Result
April 14	Jacksonville Dixie Blues	Home	Lost 20–0
April 21	Atlanta Phoenix	Home	Lost 48–32
April 28	Orlando Anarchy	Away	Lost 34–8
May 5	Palm Beach Punishers	Home	Lost 1–0**
May 12	Tallahassee Jewels	Away	Lost 16–8
May 19	Palm Beach Punishers	Away	Lost 44–28
June 2	Tampa Bay Inferno	Home	Lost 1–0**
June 16	Jacksonville Dixie Blues	Away	Lost 1–0**
