= Birmingham Steel Magnolias =

- Founded: 2002
- Folded: 2003
- League: Women's Football Association
- Conference: Central
- Based in: Birmingham, Alabama
- Stadium: Lawson Field
- Owner: Alta Svoboda

Birmingham Steel Magnolias was a women's American football team based in Birmingham, Alabama. The team played in the Central Conference of the professional Women's Football Association in the 2002–03 season. The team finished the regular season with a 5–5 record but lost the conference championship to the Indianapolis Vipers.

The Steel Magnolias' home games were played at Lawson Field. The owner was Alta Svoboda.

== Schedule ==
Key: Win Loss Bye

=== Regular season ===
Week	Day	Date	Opponent	Results		Location
Week	Day	Date	Opponent	Score	Record	Location
1	Saturday	October 12	Indianapolis Vipers	L 20–14	0–1	Lawson Field
2	Saturday	October 19	at Georgia Enforcers	W 20–8	1–1	Atlanta, GA
3	Saturday	October 26	New Orleans Voodoo Dolls	W 3–0 (forfeit)	2–1	Lawson Field
4	Saturday	November 2	Jacksonville Dixie Blues	L 40–16	2–2	Lawson Field
5	Saturday	November 9	at Indianapolis Vipers	L 14–8	2–3	Arlington High School
6	Saturday	November 16	Orlando Fire	L 35–0	2–4	Lawson Field
7	Saturday	November 23	at New Orleans Voodoo Dolls	W 3–0 (forfeit)	3–4	New Orleans, LA
8	BYE					
9	Saturday	December 7	Georgia Enforcers	W 3–0 (forfeit)	4–4	Lawson Field
10	Saturday	December 14	at Tampa Bay Force	W 3–0 (forfeit)	5–4	Tampa Bay, FL
11	Saturday	December 21	at Orlando Fire	L 3–0 (forfeit)	5–5	Orlando, FL

=== Post-season ===
Game	Day	Date	Opponent	Results		Location
Game	Day	Date	Opponent	Score	Record	Location
Conference Championship	Saturday	January 11	at Indianapolis Vipers	L 38–6	0–1	Indianapolis, IN
