= Carolina Phoenix =

- Founded: 2006
- League: Women's Football Alliance
- Team history: Carolina Phoenix (2007–present)
- Based in: Greensboro, North Carolina
- Stadium: Simeon Stadium
- Colors: Black, Yellow, White
- Head coach: Maria Ormond
- Championships: 1 Founders Bowls 3

The Carolina Phoenix is a football team in the Women's Football Alliance (WFA) based in the Triad of North Carolina. Home games are played at Simeon Stadium in High Point, North Carolina.

After finishing 5–1 in their 2007 debut season as an X-Team, the Phoenix began full-time play in 2008 as a member of Tier II. The success continued there, as the Phoenix finished 7–1, winning the Tier II South Atlantic division title before losing to the eventual Tier II champion Montreal Blitz in the semifinal round of the playoffs.

Key Players: Mikayla Tanner

== Season-by-season ==
Logo from 2007 to 2008

Season records
Season	W	L	T	Finish	Playoff results
2007	5	1	0	X-Team	--
2008	7	2	0	1st IWFL2 Southern South Atlantic	Lost IWFL2 League Semifinal (Montreal)
2009	8	2	0	1st IWFL2	Won IWFL2 League Quarterfinal (Carolina Queens); Lost IWFL2 League Semifinal (Wisconsin)
2010	9	1	0	1st IWFL2 Eastern Southeast	Won IWFL2 Eastern Conference Semifinal (Chattanooga); Lost IWFL2 Eastern Conference Championship (Montreal)
2011	7	1	0	1st Eastern Mid-Attantic	Won Eastern Conference Semifinal (Montreal); Lost Eastern Conference Championship (Atlanta)
2012	7	1	0	2nd Eastern Mid South	Won Founders Bowl Tournament Quarterfinal (Arlington); Won Founders Bowl Tournament Semifinal (New England); Won Founders Bowl Tournament Championship (Portland)
2013	11	0	0	1st Eastern Southeast	Won Eastern Conference Semifinal (Philadelphia); Won Eastern Conference Championship (New England); Won IWFL Championship (Houston)
2014	4	5	0	1st Eastern South Atlantic	Lost Eastern Conference Semifinal (New York)
2015	8	3	0	1st Eastern South Atlantic	Won Eastern Conference Semifinal (Carolina Queens); Lost Eastern Conference Championship (Pittsburgh); Won Founders Bowl (Madison)
2016	9	1	0	2nd Eastern Atlantic	Won Founders Bowl Tournament Semifinal (Madison); Won Founders Bowl Tournament Championship (Carson)
Totals	75	17	0	(including playoffs)	

== Recent seasons ==
As of 2026, the Carolina Phoenix compete in the Women's Football Alliance (WFA) Division III within the American Conference, with scheduled games for the 2026 season.

== Season schedule ==
=== 2009 ===
Date	Opponent	Home/Away	Result
April 11	Louisville Nightmare	Home	Won 32-7
April 18	Erie Illusion	Home	Won 6-0
May 2	Orlando Mayhem	Home	Won 42-15
May 9	Cape Fear Thunder	Away	Won 48-0
May 23	Palm Beach Punishers	Away	Won 14-9
May 30	Carolina Queens	Home	Won 8-0
June 6	Cape Fear Thunder	Away	Won 55-8
June 13	Carolina Queens	Away	Lost 20-36
June 27	Carolina Queens (Tier II Quarterfinal)	Away	Won 26-16
July 11	Wisconsin Warriors (Tier II Semifinal)	Away	Lost 6-28

=== 2010 ===
Date	Opponent	Home/Away	Result
April 3	Carolina Queens	Away	Won 26-2
April 10	Palm Beach Punishers	Home	Won 49-0
April 24	Louisville Nightmare	Away	Won 58-0
May 1	Chattanooga Locomotion	Home	Won 56-0
May 8	Carolina Queens	Home	Won 48-0
May 15	Tennessee Valley Tigers	Away	Won 72-0
May 22	Palm Beach Punishers	Away	Won 74-14
June 5	Baltimore Nighthawks	Home	Won 22-20
