= Wisconsin Warriors =

Former football team

- Founded: 2008
- League: Independent Women's Football League
- Team history: Wisconsin Warriors (2008-2015)
- Based in: Greendale, Wisconsin
- Stadium: Greendale High School
- Colors
- Owner: Jodi vonSpreckelsen
- Coaches: Scott Flood, Thomas Handziak, Nate Harris, Norm Killion
- Championships: 1 (2009 Tier II)

The Wisconsin Warriors were a football team in the Independent Women's Football League. Based in Greendale, the Warriors played their home games on the campus of Greendale High School. The Warriors were the defending IWFL North American Champions of 2009.

== History ==
=== 2008 ===
The Warriors were formed in 2007, continuing a legacy of women's football in SE Wisconsin perpetuated by the Wisconsin Riveters and Northern Ice among other teams. Their inaugural season was a struggle, as the Warriors only finished 2-6 and fourth place in the Midwest Division.

=== 2009 ===
In 2009 (after they had already been assigned a Tier I-strength schedule), the Warriors opted to move to Tier II. Though they had only finished 4-4 on the regular season, their team rating/strength of schedule (being the only Tier II team to pick up two wins against Tier I-both vs. the Minnesota Vixen), the Warriors wrapped up home-field advantage throughout the playoffs. In the first round, the Warriors dominated the Chattanooga Locomotion with a 32-6 victory. that task was not much more difficult in the following round; thanks to a 28-6 win over the Carolina Phoenix, the Warriors won the Regional Championship. On July 25, the Warriors won the IWFL Tier II North American Championship, defeating the defending champion Montreal Blitz, 42-14, at Round Rock ISD Athletic Stadium in Round Rock, Texas (a suburb of Austin).

=== 2010 ===
They finished 6-4 in 2010, won their division and beat the Memphis Belles in the quarterfinals of the Tier II playoffs but did not win the Tier that year as they lost in the semifinals.

=== 2011 ===
They moved up to Tier I in 2011. The Warriors were featured on Fox 6 twice. They would finish 8-0 that year, their first ever undefeated season, claimed the Midwest division title and made the Tier I playoffs where they would win a quarterfinal. But once again, they lost in the semifinals and wouldn't win the Tier title in 2011.

== Season-By-Season ==
Season records
Season	W	L	T	Finish	Playoff results
2008	2	6	0	4th East Midwest	--
2009	7	4	0	1st Tier II	Won Tier II Quarterfinal (Chattanooga); Won Tier II Semifinal (Carolina); Won Tier II Championship (Montreal)
2010	6	4	0	2nd Tier II West	Won Tier II Midwest Division (Memphis)
2011	9	1	0	2nd Tier I West	Won Tier I Midwest Division
2012*	9	1	0	2nd Tier I West	Won Midwest Division
Totals	33	16	0	(including playoffs)	

* = Current Standing

== Season Schedules ==
=== 2009 ===
Date	Opponent	Home/Away	Result
April 11	Detroit Demolition	Away	Lost 6-34
April 18	Chicago Force	Away	Lost 20-38
April 25	Iowa Crush	Home	Won 30-0
May 2	Minnesota Vixen	Away	Won 54-16
May 9	Kansas City Tribe	Away	Lost 0-58
May 23	Iowa Crush	Home	Won 42-0
May 30	Minnesota Vixen	Home	Won 38-8
June 6	Kansas City Tribe	Home	Lost 12-19
June 27	Chattanooga Locomotion (Tier II Quarterfinal)	Home	Won 32-6
July 11	Carolina Phoenix (Tier II Semifinal)	Home	Won 28-6
July 25	Montreal Blitz (Tier II Championship)	Neutral (Round Rock)	Won 42-14

=== 2010 ===
Date	Opponent	Home/Away	Result
April 3	Chicago Force	Away	Lost 0-42
April 17	Chicago Force	Home	Lost 7-30
April 24	Erie Illusion	Home	Won 19-0
May 1	Wisconsin Wolves	Away	Won 50-12
May 8	Kansas City Tribe	Away	Lost 0-44
May 15	Iowa Crush	Home	Won 40-0
May 22	Minnesota Vixen	Home	Won 55-0
June 5	Iowa Crush	Away	Won 28-0
June 12 - Midwest Division	Memphis Belles	Home	Won 36-6
July 10 - Western Conference	Bay Area Bandits	Away	Lost 2-35
