= Detroit Dark Angels =

Women's American football team

- Founded: 2010
- Folded: reorganized as the Venom
- League: Women's Football Alliance
- Team history: Detroit Dark Angels (2010-2021)
- Stadium: The Hawk Community Center
- Colors: black, crimson, white
- Owner: DDA Football, Inc.
- President: Alecia Sweeney
- Head coach: Keith Thomas
- Championships: 0
- Conference titles: 2 (2019, 2021)
- Mascot: Dark Angel

The Detroit Dark Angels were a women's semi-professional American football team founded in 2010 by Chuck Lauber and Aaron Brothers. In 2014, the team was purchased and reorganized as a 501(c)3 corporation DDA Football Inc., by a group that included former Detroit Demolition players Alecia Sweeney and Yarlen Henry along with Coach Keith Thomas.

Based in the Detroit, Michigan area, the Dark Angels played their home games at Southfield HS and The Hawk Community Center Farmington Hills, Michigan. The Dark Angels were members of the Women's Football Alliance (WFA) and competed in Division 2 of the WFA's three-tier structure.

== History ==
The Detroit Dark Angels were founded in 2010 by Chuck Lauber and Aaron Brothers following the discontinuation of the Detroit Demolition. Players from the Demolition formed the core of the new team. Former Demolition players included linebackers Kim Walters and Misty Findley, tackles Lisa Miles and Mindy Corby, running back Aisha Moore, center Alecia Sweeney, wide receiver Kristine Vidojevski and lineman Catherine Moss. The team was led by Head Coach Tony Gaisser (3-5) in their first season.

In 2011, Darrin Wubbenhorst (22-20) was named Head Coach, a position he held through 2015.

In 2016, the team was purchased and reorganized as a 501(c)3 corporation DDA Football Inc., by a group that included former Detroit Demolition player Alecia Sweeney. Keith Thomas (25-19), a long-time member of the coaching staff, was named Head Coach.

Westland John Glenn High School was established as the Dark Angels's home venue in its inaugural season, until 2016. The team then changed home stadiums several times, moving to Wayne Memorial High School in 2017, Southfield Lathrup High School in 2018, and the HAWK Community Center in Farmington Hills in 2021.

== Highlights ==
Highlights for the team include the 2012 season when they went undefeated 8–0 in the regular season. They were eliminated in the playoffs by the Pittsburgh Passion.

The Dark Angels got revenge on Pittsburgh when they eliminated the Passion in the 2019 WFA Division 2 National Conference Championship Game. The victory propelled the team to their first national championship game, but they fell to the St. Louis Slam.

In 2021, the team's final season, the Dark Angels again reached the WFA Division 2 National Championship Game but lost to the Nevada Storm.

== Season-by-season ==
Season records
Season	W	L	T	Finish	Playoff results
2010	3	5	0	3rd National North Central	--
2011	6	2	0	2nd National North Central	--
2012	8	1	0	1st National Mideast	Lost National Conference Wild Card (Pittsburgh)
2013	2	6	0	3rd National Great Lakes	--
2014	4	4	0	3rd National Great Lakes	--
2015	2	6	0	4th National Great Lakes	--
2016	3	5	0	4th National Great Lakes	--
2017	4	4	0	8th National Conference (Tier 2)	--
2018	5	3	0	5th National Conference (Tier 2)	--
2019	6	2	0	3rd National Conference (Tier 2)	Won Regional Final (Columbus Comets); Won National Conference Final (Pittsburgh); Lost WFA Division 2 Championship (St. Louis)
2021	3	3	0	1st National Conference (Tier 2)	Won Regional Final (Baltimore); Won National Conference Final (Jacksonville); Lost WFA Division 2 Championship (Nevada Storm)
Totals	50	44	0		

== 2010 ==
=== Season Schedules ===
Date	Opponent	Home/Away	Result
April 10	West Michigan Mayhem	Home	Lost 0-52
April 24	Toledo Reign	Away	Won 7-6
May 1	Cleveland Fusion	Away	Lost 12-39
May 15	Dayton Diamonds	Home	Won 45-0
May 22	Pittsburgh Force	Away	Lost 14-31
June 5	Cleveland Fusion	Home	Lost 14-34
June 12	Toledo Reign	Home	Won 20-0
June 19	West Michigan Mayhem	Away	Lost 0-73

== 2011 ==
=== Standings ===
2011 North Central 2 Division
	W	L	T	PCT	PF	PA	DIV	GB	STK
y-Detroit Dark Angels	6	2	0	0.750	242	82	3-1	---	W4
Toledo Reign	4	4	0	0.500	209	161	3-1	2.0	L3
Dayton Diamonds	0	8	0	0.000	24	462	0-4	5.5	L8

=== Season Schedules ===
Date	Opponent	Home/Away	Result
April 2	Kentucky Karma	Home	Won 14-0
April 9	Cincinnati Sizzle	Home	Won 33-7
April 16	Indy Crash	Away	Lost 6-33
April 30	Toledo Reign	Away	Lost 6-19
May 14	Dayton Diamonds	Home	Won 69-0
June 4	Toledo Reign	Home	Won 33-6
June 11	Dayton Diamonds	Away	Won 57-0
June 18	West Michigan Mayhem	Away	Won 24-14

== 2012 ==
=== Standings ===
2012 Division 4
	W	L	T	PCT	PF	PA	DIV	GB	STK
Detroit Dark Angels	8	0	0	1.000	248	46	4-0	---	W8
Cleveland Fusion	2	5	0	0.333	60	168	2-1	3	L1
Pittsburgh Force	0	6	0	0.000	26	210	0-4	5	L6

=== Season schedule ===
Date	Opponent	Home/Away	Result
April 14	Pittsburgh Force	Away	Won 35-6
April 21	Toledo Reign	Away	Won 35-0
April 28	Cleveland Fusion	Home	Won 14-6
May 5	West Michigan Mayhem	Home	Won 26-14
May 12	Wisconsin Dragons	Home	Won 60-0
May 19	Columbus Comets	Away	Won 7-0
June 2	Pittsburgh Force	Home	Won 54-6
June 9	Cleveland Fusion	Away	Won 17-14
June 23	Pittsburgh Passion	Away	Loss 0-34

== 2013 ==
=== Season Schedules ===
Date	Opponent	Home/Away	Result
April 6	Chicago Force	Away	Lost 0-62
April 13	Indy Crash	Away	Lost 6-22
April 20	West Michigan Mayhem	Home	Lost 0-40
May 4	Indy Crash	Home	Won 6-0
May 11	Chicago Force	Home	Lost 0-61
May 18	West Michigan Mayhem	Away	Win 19-13
June 1	Columbus Comets	Home	Lost 0-24
June 8	Pittsburgh Passion	Away	Lost 0-31

=== Roster ===
Jersey Number	Name	Position	Height	Weight	Years	Experience	Hometown
2	Davidson, Enika	DB	5'7"	150	8	8	N/A
3	Leduc, Andrea	WR	5'4"	125	1	Rookie	Dearborn Heights (Albion)
4	Dietrich, Bri	LB	5'8"	180	2	2	Romeo, MI (Wayne State University)
5	Mathews, Dominique	RB	4'9"	128	1	2	Detroit, MI (University of Michigan)
6	Russell, Leilani	FS	5'5"	130	2	2	Detroit, MI (Renaissance)
7	Beier, Nicole	QB	6'2"	175	1	4	Fort Wayne, IN (St. Marys)
8	Vidojevski, Kristine	QB/WR	5'7"	120	13	13	Riverview, MI (Wayne State University)
9	Kosanic, Brooke	WR/RB	5'7"	120	5	5	Grand Haven (Michigan State University)
10	Lachlainn, Sabreena	DL/P	5'9"	180	4	8	Drummond, MT (Northern Michigan University)
11	Barc, Amanda	DB	5'7"	125	2	2	Madison Heights, MI
12	McKay, Laquetia	RB	5'4"	150	3	3	Detroit, MI (Murray Wright)
13	Wilber, Kendra	FS	5'8"	175	1	1	Onronagon, MI (Finlandia University)
14	Castillo, Alyssa	TE	5'10"	180	1	1	Hamilton, MI (Albion)
15	Kuhl, Dawn	WR	5'6"	125	1	Rookie	Adrian, MI (Stautzenburger College)
20	Mooney, Kristen	RB/WR	5'5"	130	2	2	Canada
21	Carter, Keontay (ke-ke)	RB	5'7"	150	2	2	Detroit, MI (Eastern Michigan University)
22	Tucker, Cortney	LB	5'7"	197	4	4	Royal Oak, MI (Madonna University)
23	Wahl, Katelin	LB	5'6"	170	2	2	Clinton, MI (Siena Heights University)
24	Floyd, LaToyia	LB	5'7"	150	8	8	Detroit, MI
25	Raboczkay, Melissa	WR	5'5"	117	1	1	Taylor, MI (Eastern Michigan University)
26	Barney, Monique	LB	5'5"	170	1	Rookie	Detroit, MI (RIT)
28	Nugent, Andrea	DB	5'7"	150	6	6	N/
29	Wiechers, Kimberly	FS/DB	5'7"	140	1	1	Rhode Island (Wayne State University)
30	Williams, Ajae’sha	DT	5'3"	165	1	1	Jackson, MI (Eastern Michigan University)
31	Bacchus, Jennifer	WR	5'8"	150	2	4	Kinston, NC (Mt. Olive College)
32	LaFrance, Deidre	FB	5'8"	216	3	10	Detroit, MI (Western Illinois)
33	Ballard, Jessica	DB	5'5"	124	1	1	Dexter, MI (Washtenaw Community College)
35	Salkeld, Konstantine	LB/DB	5'5"	150	2	2	Madison Heights, MI (University of Michigan)
36	Clark, Stacia	RB	5'9"	200	2	2	Chicago, IL (Eastern Michigan University)
42	Doughty, Delainey	LB	5'8"	150	2	2	Midland, MI (Madonna University)
43	McGowan, Erin	DE	5'7"	150	2	2	Brown City, MI (Michigan State University)
44	Guyton, Cheron	LB/RB	5'8"	160	2	2	Highland Park, MI (Oakland University)
45	Halloway, Ebony	SS	5'11"	167	1	Rookie	Detroit, MI (Henry Ford)
48	Hall, Christina	TE	5'6"	190	1	1	Detroit, MI (Henderson State University)
50	Allen, Dominique	DT/DE	5'10"	208	1	1	Detroit, MI (Wayne State University)
51	Adams, Ciara	xxxxx	xxxxx	xxxxx	xxxxx	xxxxx	xxxxx
52	Mann, Cornice	OL	5'7"	205	1	1	(Le Cordon Bleu)
53	Wunderlich, Jana	OL	5'11"	185	1	1	Chemnitz, MI (Tech College)
54	Moore, Taylor	OL	5'8"	200	1	2	Lansing, MI (Middle Tennessee State)
62	Adams, Caelin	OL	5'9"	175	1	Rookie	N/A
63	Cherry, Yolanda	OL	5'8"	200	8	8	Highland, MI
66	Brewer, Brandy	OL	5'3"	185	4	10	Saline, MI (Central Michigan University)
68	Mundy, Annquenetta	OL	N/A	N/A	1	Rookie	Lenox, MI
74	Sweeney, Alecia	C	5'8"	N/A	9	9	Royal Oak, MI (Western Michigan University)
75	Robinson, Celeste	OL	5'11"	250	2	4	Southfield, MI (New York University)
76	Seay, Maricka	C	5'11"	185	1	1	Detroit (Macomb Community College)
77	Toure, Lisa	OL	5'4"	185	5	5	Army Brat (Wayne State University)
78	Dewey, Annie	OL	5'9"	225	2	2	Clarkston (Central Michigan University)
83	Luther, Cheryl	WR	5'6"	138	12	12	Flatrock, MI (Life University)
88	Witchen, Kelly	WR	N/A	N/A	2	2	N/A (Ohio State)
92	Moss, Catherine (Cat)	DT	5'2"	175	9	9	Imlay, MI (Wayne State University)
93	Henry, Yarlen	DE	5'10"	169	4	10	Miami, FL (Webber International University)
96	Corby, Mindy	OL	5'10"	N/A	5	5	Marysville, MI
97	Crosby, Erika	LB	5'6"	166	1	1	Goodrich (Michigan State University)
98	George, Takanta	DT	5'8"	200	10	10	Romulus, MI
