= Savannah Sabers =

- Founded: 2010; 16 years ago
- League: Women's Football Alliance
- Team history: Savannah Sabers (2011-future)
- Based in: Savannah, Georgia
- Stadium: Memorial Stadium
- Colors: Black and Orange
- Owner: Andi Pigneri
- Head coach: Paul Snider
- Championships: 0

The Savannah Sabers were a team of the Women's Football Alliance which began play in 2011. Based in Savannah, Georgia, the Sabers played their home games in Savannah at Memorial Stadium.

The Sabers played for four seasons from 2011 to 2014.

== Season-by-season ==
Season records
| Season | W | L | T | Finish | Playoff results |
|---|---|---|---|---|---|
| 2011 | 1 | 7 | 0 | 3rd National Atlantic | – |
| 2012* | 5 | 3 | 0 | 2nd WFA National 7 | – |
| Totals | 6 | 10 | 0 | | |

* = current standing

== 2012 ==
=== Standings ===
2012 Atlantic Division
| | W | L | T | PCT | PF | PA | DIV | GB | STK |
|---|---|---|---|---|---|---|---|---|---|
| y-Atlanta Phoenix | 7 | 1 | 0 | 0.875 | 306 | 98 | 4-0 | --- | W2 |
| Savannah Sabers | 5 | 3 | 0 | 0.625 | 210 | 206 | 3-1 | 2.0 | L1 |
| Carolina Raging Wolves | 0 | 8 | 0 | 0.000 | 50 | 355 | 0-5 | 7.0 | L8 |

=== Season schedule ===
| Date | Opponent | Home/Away | Result |
|---|---|---|---|
| April 14 | Palm Beach Punishers | Home | Won 33–28 |
| April 21 | Carolina Raging Wolves | Away | Won 28–0 |
| April 28 | Atlanta Phoenix | Away | Lost 13–57 |
| May 12 | Tampa Bay Inferno | Away | Lost 0–46 |
| May 19 | Carolina Raging Wolves | Home | Won 47–0 |
| June 2 | Orlando Anarchy | Away | Won 34–20 |
| June 9 | Carolina Raging Wolves | Home | Won 41–14 |
| June 16 | Atlanta Phoenix | Home | Lost 14–41 |

== 2011 ==
=== Standings ===
2011 Atlantic Division
| | W | L | T | PCT | PF | PA | DIV | GB | STK |
|---|---|---|---|---|---|---|---|---|---|
| y-Atlanta Heartbreakers | 4 | 4 | 0 | 0.500 | 122 | 270 | 4-0 | --- | L1 |
| Carolina Raging Wolves | 1 | 7 | 0 | 0.125 | 84 | 249 | 1-3 | 3.0 | L2 |
| Savannah Sabers | 1 | 7 | 0 | 0.125 | 84 | 249 | 1-3 | 3.0 | L4 |

=== Season schedule ===
| Date | Opponent | Home/Away | Result |
|---|---|---|---|
| April 2 | Jacksonville Dixie Blues | Home | Lost 6–52 |
| April 9 | Orlando Anarchy | Away | Lost 14–36 |
| April 16 | Palm Beach Punishers | Away | Lost 0–38 |
| May 7 | Carolina Raging Wolves | Home | Won 7–6 |
| May 14 | Atlanta Heartbreakers | Away | Lost 19–22 |
| May 21 | Palm Beach Punishers | Home | Lost 0–35 |
| June 4 | Carolina Raging Wolves | Away | Lost 13–32 |
| June 11 | Atlanta Heartbreakers | Home | Lost 25–28 |
