= Atlanta Heartbreakers =

Women's American football team

- Founded: July 2, 2010
- League: Women's Football Alliance (2011); Women's Spring Football League (2013-2015)
- Team history: Atlanta Heartbreakers (2011, 2013-2015)
- Based in: Atlanta, Georgia
- Stadium: Henry W. Grady Stadium
- Colors: Black, Hot Pink, Silver
- President: Marq Williams
- Head coach: Marq Williams
- Championships: 0
- Dancers: Heart Stoppers

The Atlanta Heartbreakers are a team of the Women's Spring Football League which began play for the 2011 season. Based in Atlanta, Georgia, home games are played on the campus of Pebblebrook High School in nearby Mableton. They were members of the Women's Football Alliance for their inaugural season before leaving for the WSFL for the 2013 season.

== Season-by-season ==
Season records
| Season | W | L | T | Finish | Playoff results |
|---|---|---|---|---|---|
| 2011 | 4 | 4 | 0 | 1st National Atlantic | Lost National Conference Quarterfinal (Indy) |
| 2013 | 0 | 3 | 0 | 4th League | -- |
| 2014 | 0 | 4 | 0 | 3rd East | -- |
| 2015 | 0 | 6 | 0 | 4th South | -- |
| Totals | 4 | 18 | 0 | (including playoffs) | |

== 2011 ==
=== Standings ===
2011 Atlantic Division
| | W | L | T | PCT | PF | PA | DIV | GB | STK |
|---|---|---|---|---|---|---|---|---|---|
| y-Atlanta Heartbreakers | 4 | 4 | 0 | 0.500 | 122 | 270 | 4-0 | --- | L1 |
| Carolina Raging Wolves | 1 | 7 | 0 | 0.125 | 84 | 249 | 1-3 | 3.0 | L2 |
| Savannah Sabers | 1 | 7 | 0 | 0.125 | 84 | 249 | 1-3 | 3.0 | L4 |

=== Season schedule ===
| Date | Opponent | Home/Away | Result |
|---|---|---|---|
| April 2 | Gulf Coast Riptide | Home | Lost 6-64 |
| April 16 | Miami Fury | Home | Lost 0-72 |
| April 30 | Carolina Raging Wolves | Away | Won 28-14 |
| May 14 | Savannah Sabers | Home | Won 22-19 |
| May 21 | Carolina Raging Wolves | Home | Won 32-14 |
| June 4 | Palm Beach Punishers | Away | Lost 6-34 |
| June 11 | Savannah Sabers | Away | Won 28-25 |
| June 18 | Orlando Anarchy | Away | Lost 0-28 |
| June 25 | Indy Crash (National Conference Quarterfinal) | Away | Lost 0-47 |
