= Clarksville Fox =

American women's football team

- Founded: 2007
- League: Independent Women's Football League
- Team history: Clarksville Fox (WFL) (2007); Clarksville Fox (IWFL) (2008-present)
- Based in: Clarksville, Tennessee
- Stadium: Northwest High School
- Colors: Yellow, black, white
- Owner: Trish Brown
- Head coach: Ron "Gator" Graham
- Championships: 0
- Mascot: Trixy

The Clarksville Fox is a football team in the Independent Women's Football League. Based in Clarksville, Tennessee, the Fox play their home games on the campus of Northwest High School.

== History ==
=== 2007 ===
The Fox were formed in 2007 as a member of the Women's Football League. Their inaugural season was successful, finishing 4-2 on the regular season and earning a berth in the Championship Game, where the Fox lost to the Jacksonville Dixie Blues by a score of 49-6.

=== 2008 ===
After the WFL went moribund, the Fox applied for, and were subsequently accepted into, full membership in the IWFL. Playing in the Tier II Mid-South Division alongside the Shreveport Aftershock and Louisiana Fuel, the Fox finished 7-1 and won the Mid-South Division title and a spot in the Tier II playoffs. Following their 32-0 victory over the New England Intensity in the semifinals, the Fox advanced to the IWFL Tier II Championship Game, where they lost 29-6 to the Montreal Blitz.

== Season-by-season ==
Season records
Season	W	L	T	Finish	Playoff results
Clarksville Fox (WFL)
2007	4	3	0	2nd League	Lost WFL Championship (Jacksonville)
Clarksville Fox (IWFL2)
2008	8	2	0	1st Southern Mid South	Won IWFL2 Semifinal (New England); Lost IWFL2 Championship (Montreal)
2009	4	4	0	17th IWFL2	--
2010	5	3	0	3rd Western Midwest	--
Clarksville Fox (IWFL)
2011	3	5	0	3rd Eastern Mid South	--
Totals	24	17	0	(including playoffs)	

== Season schedules ==
=== 2009 ===
Date	Opponent	Home/Away	Result
April 11	Atlanta Xplosion	Away	Lost 0-43
April 25	Louisville Nightmare	Home	Won 37-7
May 2	Iowa Crush	Away	Won 14-0
May 16	Kansas City Tribe	Away	Lost 6-48
May 23	Tennessee Valley Tigers	Home	Lost 0-23
May 30	Chattanooga Locomotion	Home	Lost 0-28
June 6	Louisville Nightmare	Away	Won 12-0
June 13	Iowa Crush	Home	Won 22-12

=== 2010 ===
Date	Opponent	Home/Away	Result
April 3	Tennessee Valley Tigers	Home	Won 36-6
April 10	Chattanooga Locomotion	Home	Won 30-14
April 24	Memphis Belles	Home	
May 1	Tennessee Valley Tigers	Away	
May 15	Louisville Nightmare	Home	
May 29	Atlanta Xplosion	Away	
June 5	Memphis Belles	Away	
TBD	Louisville Nightmare	Away	
