= Tampa Bay Inferno =

Team of the Women's Football Alliance

- Founded: 2012
- League: Women's Football Alliance
- Team history: Tampa Bay Admirals (pre–2010); Tampa Bay Pirates (2010–2011); Tampa Bay Inferno (2012–present)
- Based in: Tampa, Florida
- Stadium: Sickles High School
- Colors: red, black, white
- Owner: Jennifer Moody
- Championships: 0

The Tampa Bay Inferno are a team in the Women's Football Alliance that began play for the 2012 season and are based in Tampa, Florida. Home games are played at Sickles High School.

== Season-by-season ==
Season records
Season	W	L	T	Finish	Playoff results
Tampa Bay Pirates (WFA)
2010	4	4	0	3rd National South Central	–
2011	2	6	0	3rd National Coastal	–
Tampa Bay Inferno (WFA)
2012*	7	1	0	2nd WFA National 9	–
2013	5	3	0		–
2014	7	1	0	Nat'l Conference South Atlantic Division Champions	0–1
2015	5	3	0		–
2016	8	0	0	Nat'l Conference South Atlantic Division Champions, Nat'l Conference Div II Champions	2–1
Totals	39	18	0		

== 2010 ==
=== Season schedule ===
Date	Opponent	Home/Away	Result
April 17	Carolina Raging Wolves	Home	Won 42–36
April 24	Jacksonville Dixie Blues	Home	Lost 0–63
May 8	Central Florida Anarchy	Away	Lost 0–14
May 15	Carolina Raging Wolves	Home	Won 8–0
May 22	Carolina Raging Wolves	Away	Won 26–20
June 5	Jacksonville Dixie Blues	Away	Lost 6–42
June 12	Central Florida Anarchy	Away	Won 14–9
June 19	Central Florida Anarchy	Home	Lost 0–19

== 2011 ==
=== Standings ===
2011 Coastal Division
	W	L	T	PCT	PF	PA	DIV	GB	STK
y-Miami Fury	7	1	0	0.875	302	89	4-0	---	W1
Palm Beach Punishers	5	3	0	0.625	164	96	2-2	2.0	L1
Tampa Bay Pirates	2	6	0	0.250	95	160	0-4	5.0	L6

=== Season schedule ===
Date	Opponent	Home/Away	Result
April 2	Orlando Anarchy	Home	Won 6–0
April 9	Carolina Raging Wolves	Away	Won 26–6
April 30	Miami Fury	Home	Lost 0–32
May 7	Palm Beach Punishers	Away	Lost 8–16
May 14	Gulf Coast Riptide	Away	Lost 13–18
May 21	Miami Fury	Away	Lost 21–34
June 11	Palm Beach Punishers	Home	Lost 14–20
June 18	Jacksonville Dixie Blues	Home	Lost 7–34

== 2012 ==
=== Season schedule ===
Date	Opponent	Home/Away	Result
April 14	Orlando Anarchy	Away	Won 25–0
April 28	Palm Beach Punishers	Home	Won 40–0
May 5	Jacksonville Dixie Blues	Home	Lost 6–35
May 12	Savannah Sabers	Home	Won 46–0
May 19	Atlanta Phoenix	Away	Won 26–25
June 2	Miami Fury	Away	Won 1–0**
June 9	Orlando Anarchy	Home	Won 42–20
June 16	Palm Beach Punishers	Away	Won 1–0**

== 2013 ==
=== Season schedule ===
Date	Opponent	Home/Away	Result
April 6	Savannah Sabers	Away	Won 40–14
April 13	Orlando Anarchy	Away	Won 34–14
April 20	Tallahassee Jewels	Away	Won 62–22
April 27	Orlando Anarchy	Home	Won 60–7
May 11	Tallahassee Jewels	Home	Won 47–0
May 18	Miami Fury	Home	Lost 6–22
May 25	Jacksonville Dixie Blues	Home	Won 21–12
June 8	Miami Fury	Away	Lost 0–28
June 15	Atlanta Phoenix	Away	Lost 19–24

== 2014 ==
=== Season schedule ===
Date	Opponent	Home/Away	Result
April 5	Atlanta Phoenix	Away	Won 32–25
April 12	Savannah Sabers	Home	Won 55–6
April 26	Orlando Anarchy	Away	Won 68–0
May 3	Daytona Breakers	Home	Won 77–0
May 10	Jacksonville Dixie Blues	Away	Won 49–0
May 17	Orlando Anarchy	Home	Won 57–0
May 24	Miami Fury	Home	Won 14–13
June 7	Miami Fury	Away	Lost 2–14

=== Postseason Games ===
Date	Opponent	Home/Away	Result
June 14	Atlanta Phoenix	Home	Lost 7–15

== 2015 ==
=== Season schedule ===
Date	Opponent	Home/Away	Result
April 11	Jacksonville Dixie Blues	Home	Won 17–9
April 18	Miami Fury	Home	Won 21–13
May 2	Daytona Wave Runners	Home	Won 54–0
May 9	Atlanta Phoenix	Away	Lost 19–26
May 16	Jacksonville Dixie Blues	Away	Lost 6–37
May 30	Daytona Wave Runners	Away	Won 35–0
June 6	Orlando Anarchy	Home	Won *
June 13	Miami Fury	Away	Lost 0–26

== 2016 ==
=== Season schedule ===
Date	Opponent	Home/Away	Result
April 2	Atlanta Phoenix	Away	Won 17–14
April 9	Daytona Wave Runners	Home	Won 38–12
April 16	Jacksonville Dixie Blues	Away	Won 45–27
April 23	Orlando Anarchy	Home	Won 49–6
April 30	Daytona Wave Runners	Away	Won 31–0
May 7	Orlando Anarchy	Home	Won 44–6
May 21	Daytona Wave Runners	Home	Won 41–8
June 4	Jacksonville Dixie Blues	Home	Won 31–3

=== Postseason Games ===
Date	Opponent	Home/Away	Result
June 25	Alabama Fire	Home	Won 50–12
July 9	Philadelphia Phantomz	Away	Won 38–28
July 22	St. Louis Slam	Away	Lost 7–38
