= Carolina Raging Wolves =

- Founded: 2010
- League: Women's Football Alliance
- Team history: Carolina Raging Wolves (2010–2012)
- Based in: St. Pauls, North Carolina
- Stadium: St. Pauls High School
- Colors: Black, Carolina blue, silver, white
- President: Ann McClellan
- Head coach: Mark Parker
- Championships: 0

The Carolina Raging Wolves were a team of the Women's Football Alliance that played from 2010 through 2012. Home games were played on the campus of St. Pauls High School in St. Pauls, North Carolina, southwest of Fayetteville.

== Season-by-season ==
Season records
Season	W	L	T	Finish	Playoff results
2010	0	8	0	4th National South Central	–
2011	1	7	0	2nd National Atlantic	–
2012	0	8	0	3rd National Southeast	–
Totals	1	23	0		

== 2010 ==
=== Season schedule ===
Date	Opponent	Home/Away	Result
April 17	Tampa Bay Pirates	Away	Lost 36–42
April 24	Central Florida Anarchy	Home	Lost 14–35
May 1	Jacksonville Dixie Blues	Away	Lost 6–45
May 8	Jacksonville Dixie Blues	Home	Lost 16–48
My 15	Tampa Bay Pirates	Away	Lost 0–8
May 22	Tampa Bay Pirates	Home	Lost 20–26
June 5	Central Florida Anarchy	Away	Lost 6–26
June 12	Jacksonville Dixie Blues	Home	Lost 6–48

== 2011 ==
=== Standings ===
2011 Atlantic Division
	W	L	T	PCT	PF	PA	DIV	GB	STK
y-Atlanta Heartbreakers	4	4	0	0.500	122	270	4-0	---	L1
Carolina Raging Wolves	1	7	0	0.125	84	249	1-3	3.0	L2
Savannah Sabers	1	7	0	0.125	84	249	1-3	3.0	L4

=== Season schedule ===
Date	Opponent	Home/Away	Result
April 2	Miami Fury	Away	Lost 0–62
April 9	Tampa Bay Pirates	Home	Lost 6–26
April 30	Atlanta Heartbreakers	Home	Lost 14–28
May 7	Savannah Sabers	Away	Lost 6–7
May 21	Atlanta Heartbreakers	Away	Lost 14–32
June 4	Savannah Sabers	Home	Won 32–13
June 11	Orlando Anarchy	Home	Lost 0–30
June 18	Gulf Coast Riptide	Away	Lost 14–36

== 2012 ==
=== Season schedule ===
Date	Opponent	Home/Away	Result
April 14	Atlanta Phoenix	Away	
April 21	Savannah Sabers	Home	
April 28	Tallahassee Jewels	Away	
May 5	Atlanta Phoenix	Home	
May 19	Savannah Sabers	Away	
June 2	Jacksonville Dixie Blues	Home	
June 9	Savannah Sabers	Away	
June 16	Orlando Anarchy	Home	
