= Women's Football Association (2002–03) =

Women's American football league

The Women's Football Association was a women's American football league formed in 2002 and which folded in 2003. Many of the league's members had been part of the Women's American Football League.

== Teams ==
Central Conference

- Birmingham Steel Magnolias
- Georgia Enforcers
- Indianapolis Vipers
- New Orleans Voodoo Dolls

Southern Conference

- Carolina Crusaders
- Jacksonville Dixie Blues
- Orlando Fire
- Tampa Bay Force

== Championship game ==
- 2002–03 season — Jacksonville Dixie Blues won 68–20 over the Indianapolis Vipers.

== See also ==
- List of leagues of American football
- Women's football in the United States
