= Detroit Demolition =

Sports team

- Founded: 2002
- Team history: Detroit Danger (NWFL) (2002); Detroit Demolition (NWFA) (2003-2005); Detroit Demolition (IWFL) (2006-2009)
- Colors: orange, black, white
- Championships: 5 (4 NWFA: 2002, 2003, 2004, 2005) (1 IWFL: 2007)

The Detroit Demolition was a women's American football team based in the Detroit, Michigan area. During their most recent season, home games were played at Franklin High School in Livonia. They joined the National Women's Football Association (NWFA) in 2002 as the Detroit Danger, winning a national championship. Their only loss that year was in the regular season to the Cleveland Fusion by a score of 14–3.

== History ==
Founded by entrepreneur Kris Dreyer in 2002 as a member of the National Women's Football League (NWFA), the Detroit Danger posted a 10-1 inaugural season under Head Coach Tony Blankenship, winning the national championship against the Massachusetts Mutiny 48–30.

Former Demolition logo.

Local businessman Mitch Rosen took ownership of the Detroit Danger and changed the team's name to the Detroit Demolition prior to the 2003 season. The team continued to thrive under Head Coach Tony Blankenship, winning three more NWFA championship titles consecutively (2003–2005), going undefeated in each of those three seasons. In 2005, the team played a special Mother's Day exhibition game at Ford Field, home of the Detroit Lions.

In 2006, the Demolition sought membership into the Independent Women's Football League (IWFL) and was subsequently accepted. Detroit reached the 2006 IWFL championship game but were upset by the Atlanta Xplosion 21–14. It was only the team's second loss in the franchise's five-year history. Jeff "J.R." Rose took a controlling interest in the ownership of the franchise amidst financial struggles for the team following the 2006 season. The Detroit Demolition bounced back to win the 2007 IWFL championship game, taking the title back from Atlanta Xplosion 17–7.

With a stream of player retirements — including star quarterback Kim Grodus — and the rising competitiveness of its IWFL opponents like the Chicago Force, D.C. Divas and Pittsburgh Passion, the team's fortunes on the field fell. The Demolition posted a 7–2 record in 2008 and a 4–4 record in 2009. Al Seden, who took over team ownership in 2009, was unable to launch a 2010 season.

The Demolition played their home games at Livonia Franklin High School and Livonia Stevenson High School.

== Legacy ==
The franchise was the first in the modern era of women's pro football (1999–present) to win five national championships. They also held 20-year-long record of consecutive wins with 50, until the Texas Elite Spartans of the Women’s National Football Conference (WNFC) won their 51st consecutive game in 2024.

== Season-by-season ==
Season records
| Season | W | L | T | Finish | Playoff results |
|---|---|---|---|---|---|
Detroit Danger (NWFL)
| 2002 | 10 | 1 | 0 | 1st Great Lakes | Won League Quarterfinal (Nashville); Won League Semifinal (Pensacola); Won NWFL Championship (Massachusetts) |
Detroit Demolition (NWFA)
| 2003 | 11 | 0 | 0 | 1st Northern Great Lakes | Won Northern Conference Semifinal (Cleveland); Won Northern Conference Championship (Philadelphia); Won NWFA Championship (Pensacola) |
| 2004 | 11 | 0 | 0 | 1st Northern Great Lakes | Won Northern Conference Semifinal (Columbus); Won Northern Conference Championship (D.C.); Won NWFA Championship (Oklahoma City) |
| 2005 | 11 | 0 | 0 | 1st Northern | Won Northern Conference Semifinal (Southwest Michigan); Won Northern Conference Championship (D.C.); Won NWFA Championship (Pensacola) |
Detroit Demolition (IWFL)
| 2006 | 10 | 1 | 0 | 1st Western Midwest | Won Western Conference Semifinal (Chicago); Won Western Conference Championship (Sacramento); Lost IWFL Championship (Atlanta) |
| 2007 | 10 | 1 | 0 | 1st Western Midwest | Won Western Conference Semifinal (Kansas City); Won Western Conference Championship (Sacramento); Won IWFL Championship (Atlanta) |
| 2008 | 7 | 2 | 0 | 2nd Eastern Midwest | Lost Eastern Conference Semifinal (Chicago) |
| 2009 | 4 | 4 | 0 | 3rd Eastern Mid-Atlantic | -- |
| Totals | 74 | 9 | 0 | (including playoffs) | |

== Season schedules ==
=== 2009 ===
| Date | Opponent | Home/Away | Result |
|---|---|---|---|
| April 11 | Wisconsin Warriors | Home | Won 34-6 |
| April 18 | Pittsburgh Passion | Away | Lost 6-29 |
| April 25 | D.C. Divas | Home | Lost 0-35 |
| May 2 | Baltimore Nighthawks | Away | Won 13-0 |
| May 16 | Chicago Force | Home | Won 21-19 |
| May 23 | Pittsburgh Passion | Home | Lost 12-34 |
| June 6 | Erie Illusion | Away | Won 33-7 |
| June 13 | Chicago Force | Away | Lost 6-26 |
