= Orlando Mayhem =

Football team

- Founded: 2002
- League: Independent Women's Football League
- Team history: Orlando Starz (2002-2004); Orlando Mayhem (2004-present)
- Based in: Clermont, Florida
- Stadium: East Ridge High School
- Colors: Silver, red, blue
- Owner: Richard White
- Head coach: Tony Chaves
- Championships: 0

The Orlando Mayhem is a football team in the Independent Women's Football League based in Orlando, Florida. Home games are played on the campus of East Ridge High School in nearby Clermont.

From their inaugural season of 2002 until the middle of 2004, the Mayhem was known as the Orlando Starz.

== Season-by-season ==
Season records
Season	W	L	T	Finish	Playoff results	2002	4	1	0	2nd East Division	--
2003	1	8	0	3rd East South Atlantic	--						
-	2004	2	6	0	3rd East South Atlantic	--					
Orlando Mayhem (IWFL)
2005	0	10	0	3rd East South Atlantic	--						
2006	5	3	0	3rd East South Atlantic	--						
2007	6	2	0	2nd East South Atlantic	--						
2008	7	1	0	1st Tier II East South Atlantic	Lost Eastern Conference Semifinal (Pittsburgh)						
2009	2	6	0	7th Tier II	--						
Totals	25	40	0	(including playoffs)							

== 2009 season schedule ==
Date	Opponent	Home/Away	Result
April 11	Miami Fury	Home	Lost 0-21
April 18	Palm Beach Punishers	Away	Lost 6-21
April 25	Houston Energy	Home	Won 28-7
May 2	Carolina Phoenix	Away	Lost 15-42
May 16	Miami Fury	Away	Lost 6-27
May 30	Palm Beach Punishers	Home	Won 41-25
June 6	Miami Fury	Away	Lost 0-18
June 13	Atlanta Xplosion	Home	Lost 14-19
