= Tallahassee Jewels =

- Founded: 2011
- League: Women's Football Alliance
- Team history: Tallahassee Jewels (2012-2013)
- Based in: Tallahassee, Florida
- Stadium: Godby High School
- Colors: Purple, Blue, White
- Owners: Lynnette Alvarado
- Coaches: Lynnette Alvarado
- Championships: 0

The Tallahassee Jewels were an expansion team of the Women's Football Alliance that began play in the 2012 season. Based in Tallahassee, Florida, the Jewels played their home games on the campus of Godby High School.

== Season-by-season ==
Season records
Season	W	L	T	Finish	Playoff results
2012*	4	1	0	1st WFA National 8	--

* = current standing

== 2012 ==
=== Season schedule ===
Date	Opponent	Home/Away	Result
April 14	Acadiana Zydeco	Home	W 8-6
April 21	Palm Beach Punishers	Away	L 6-14
April 28	Carolina Raging Wolves	Home	W 42-21
May 5	Gulf Coast Riptide	Away	W 26-20
May 12	Miami Fury	Home	W 16-8
May 19	Gulf Coast Riptide	Home	W 1-0 Forfeit
June 9	Gulf Coast Riptide	Away	W 1-0 Forfeit
June 16	Acadiana Zydeco	Away	L 6-18
June 23	Atlanta Phoenix	Away	L 0-55
