= Chattanooga Locomotion =

US women's American football team

- Founded: 2001
- League: Independent Women's Football League
- Team history: NWFA (2001–2008); IWFL (2009–2011, 2013–2014)
- Based in: Chattanooga, Tennessee
- Stadium: Red Bank High School
- Colors: Purple, red, silver, white
- President: Cheryl Jacobs
- Head coach: Steve Lewis
- Championships: 0

The Chattanooga Locomotion was a team in the Independent Women's Football League based in Chattanooga, Tennessee. The Home games of the team were played on the campus of Red Bank High School.

From their inception in 2001 until 2008, the Locomotion played in the National Women's Football Association.

== Season-by-season ==
Season records
Season	W	L	T	Finish	Playoff results
Chattanooga Locomotion (NWFA)
2001	1	7	0	5th Southern	--
2002	4	4	0	3rd Central	--
2003	11	1	0	1st Southern Central	Lost Southern Conference Semifinal (Oklahoma City)
2004	6	2	0	1st Southern South	Lost Southern Conference Semifinal (Pensacola)
2005	8	3	0	4th Southern	Won Southern Conference Quarterfinal (Dallas); Lost Southern Conference Semifinal (Pensacola)
2006	6	3	0	2nd Southern Southeast	Won League Wild Card (Austin); Lost League Quarterfinal (D.C.)
2007	8	1	0	1st Southern Central	Lost Southern Conference Semifinal (Columbus)
2008	5	3	0	2nd Southern East	--
Chattanooga Locomotion (IWFL)
2009	6	3	0	6th IWFL2	Lost IWFL2 Quarterfinal (Wisconsin)
2010	4	4	0	2nd IWFL2 Eastern Southeast	Lost IWFL2 Quarterfinal (Carolina Phoenix)
2011	8	3	0	2nd Eastern Mid South	Won Founders Bowl Tournament Quarterfinal (North Texas); Lost Founders Bowl Tournament Semifinal (New England)
2013	1	6	0	4th Eastern Southeast	--
2014	0	7	0	4th Eastern South Atlantic	--
Totals	68	47	0	(including playoffs)	

== Season schedules ==
=== 2009 ===
Date	Opponent	Home/Away	Result
April 11	Tennessee Valley Tigers	Home	Won 46-0
April 18	Tennessee Valley Tigers	Away	Won 32-14
April 25	Atlanta Xplosion	Away	Lost 6-28
May 2	Shreveport Aftershock	Home	Won 62-0
May 16	Cape Fear Thunder	Home	Won 60-0
May 23	Carolina Queens	Away	Lost 12-30
May 30	Clarksville Fox	Away	Won 28-0
June 13	Louisville Nightmare	Home	Won 2-0
June 27	Wisconsin Warriors (Tier II Quarterfinal)	Away	Lost 6-32

=== 2010 ===
Date	Opponent	Home/Away	Result
April 3	Atlanta Xplosion	Home	loss
April 10	Clarksville Fox	Away	loss
April 17	Memphis Belles	Away	win
April 24	Tennessee Valley Tigers	Home	win
May 1	Carolina Phoenix	Away	loss
May 8	Memphis Belles	Home	win
May 22	Carolina Queens	Away	win
June 5	Carolina Queens	Home	win
June 19	Carolina Phoenix (Tier II Quarterfinals)	Away	loss

=== 2011 ===
Date	Opponent	Home/Away	Result
April 2	Clarksville Fox	Away	Win 30-0
April 16	Atlanta Ravens	Away	Loss 0-34
April 23	Memphis Belles	Home	Win 56-12
May 7	Clarksville Fox	Away	Win 42-0
May 21	Memphis Belles	Away	Win 26-20 (OT)
May 28	Tennessee Valley Tigers	Home	Win 2-0 (forfeit)
June 4	Atlanta Ravens	Home	Loss 0-49
June 18	Memphis Belles	Home	Win 54-0
June 25	North Texas Knockouts (Tier II Quarterfinals)	Home	Win 24-20
July 16	New England Intensity (Tier II Semifinals)	Home	Loss 0-20

== Players Honored ==
Schandra "Sunshine" Loveless, Loco #43, played on the inaugural United States national women's football team in 2010. The US team won the gold medal at the IFAF Women's World Championship while not allowing any opponents to score against them.

2011 IWFL All-Stars: Coach - Steve Lewis; Alternates - #5 Amanda Cunningham, #66 Starlisa Horton, #24 Denisha Montgomery, #14 Tiffany Newcomb, #54 Crystal Vaughan

== Former players ==
On September 1, 2006, Kristin Reese, a player for the Chattanooga Locomotion was killed in a motorcycle accident. The loss of one of their own has greatly shook them, but they promised to play harder than they ever played before, in her memory. Before the first game of the 2007 Season, the Locomotion also lost Jeff Ellis, an important member of the team performing many managerial functions.
