= Indy Crash =

Football team

- Founded: 2010
- League: Women's Football Alliance
- Team history: Indy Crash (2011–2017)
- Based in: Indianapolis, Indiana
- Stadium: Roncalli High School
- Colors
- Owner: April Priest
- Head coach: April Priest
- Championships: 0
- Mascot: Rosie the Rhino

The Indy Crash was a women's full contact football team of the Women's Football Alliance based in Indianapolis, Indiana. Home games were played at Roncalli High School.

== Season-by-season ==
Season records
Season	W	L	T	Finish	Playoff results
2011	6	2	0	1st National North Central 1	Won National Conference Quarterfinal (Atlanta); Won National Conference Semifinal (Jacksonville); Lost National Conference Championship (Boston)
2012	5	3	0	2nd National 4	Won Division Wildcard; Lost Division Championship (Chicago)
2013	2	6	0		
2014	5	4	0	2nd Great Lakes Division	Lost to (Cleveland) 38–32
2015*	3	2	0		
Totals	21	17	0		(including playoffs)

* = current standing

=== 2014 ===
2014 season records
Date	Opponent	Home/Away	Result
April 12	Chicago Force	Away	6–48 (Loss)
April 19	Detroit Dark Angels	Home	36–6 (Win)
April 26	Cleveland Fusion	Away	0–7 (Loss)
May 3	Chicago Force	Home	6–36 (Loss)
May 10	West Michigan Mayhem	Away	33–13 (Win)
May 17	Derby City Dynamite	Home	19–0 (Win)
May 31	Cincinnati Sizzle	Home	68–0 (Win)
June 7	Detroit Dark Angels	Away	35–7 (Win)
June 14	Cleveland Fusion	Away	32–38 (Loss)

=== 2012 ===
2012 season records
Date	Opponent	Home/Away	Result
April 14	Derby City Dynamite	Home	2–0 (Win)
April 28	Chicago Force	Home	0–72 (Loss)
May 5	Cincinnati Sizzle	Home	56–0 (Win)
May 12	Derby City Dynamite	Away	18–14 (Win)
May 19	West Michigan Mayhem	Away	33–39 (Loss)
June 2	Chicago Force	Away	0–71 (Loss)
June 9	West Michigan Mayhem	Home	34–7 (Win)
June 16	Toledo Reign		28–7 (Win)
June 23	Toledo Reign		52–35 (Win)
June 30	Chicago Force		14–70 (Loss)

=== 2011 ===
2011 North Central 1 Division
	W	L	T	PCT	PF	PA	DIV	GB	STK
y-Indy Crash	6	2	0	0.750	321	147	4-0	---	L1
Cincinnati Sizzle	4	4	0	0.500	222	169	2-2	2.0	W2
Kentucky Karma	1	7	0	0.125	34	318	0-4	5.0	L2

2011 season records
Date	Opponent	Home/Away	Result
April 9	St. Louis Slam	Away	Lost 6–43
April 16	Detroit Dark Angels	Home	Won 36–6
April 23	Cincinnati Sizzle	Away	Won 60–21
April 30	Kentucky Karma	Home	Won 77–0
May 14	Toledo Reign	Away	Won 34–0
May 21	Kentucky Karma	Away	Won 77–0
June 4	Cincinnati Sizzle	Home	Won 13–0
June 18	Chicago Force	Home	Lost 18–77
June 25	Atlanta Heartbreakers (National Conference Quarterfinal)	Home	Won 47–0
July 9	Jacksonville Dixie Blues (National Conference Semifinal)	Away	Won 42–0
July 16	Boston Militia (National Conference Championship)	Away	Lost 18–46
