= Oklahoma City Lightning =

Full-contact women's American football team

- Founded: 2002
- League: Women's Football Alliance
- Team history: IWFL 2002; NWFA 2002-2008; WFA 2010; Women's Spring Football League 2010-2011
- Based in: Oklahoma City, Oklahoma
- Stadium: Taft Stadium
- Colors: Green, Gold
- President: Jan Demery
- Head coach: Previous coaches= Leonard "Coco" Bullock, "Big" Mike Harris (2002-2007) Present= Kentrell Smith
- Championships: 0

The Oklahoma City Lightning is a full-contact women's American football team in the Women's Spring Football League based in Oklahoma City, Oklahoma. Home games are played at Taft Stadium.

Formerly a member of the Independent Women's Football League in their inaugural season of 2002, and then the National Women's Football Association from 2003 until 2008, they have made the playoffs in six of seven seasons played so far, losing four times in the Conference Championship Game (two to the Pensacola Power in 2003 and 2005 and once to the Austin Outlaws in 2002 and the Columbus Comets in 2007) and losing twice in the NWFA Championship Game (to the Detroit Demolition in 2004 and to the D.C. Divas in 2006).

After sitting out the 2009 season, the Lightning were blown out 62-0 by the Lone Star Mustangs in their first game of 2010. The following week, the Lightning left the WFA and almost folded, however, they have since joined the Women's Spring Football League, where they will play the remainder of 2010 and beyond.

== Season-By-Season ==
Season records
Season	W	L	T	Finish	Playoff results
Oklahoma City Lightning (IWFL)
2002	5	3	0	3rd Western	--
Oklahoma City Lightning (NWFA)
2003	7	1	0	1st South Midwest	Won Southern Conference Quarterfinal (Nashville); Won Southern Conference Semifinal (Chattanooga); Lost Southern Conference Championship (Pensacola)
2004	8	0	0	1st South Southwest	First-Round Bye in Southern Conference Quarterfinal; Won Southern Conference Semifinal (Kansas City); Won Southern Conference Championship (Pensacola); Lost NWFA Championship (Detroit)
2005	7	1	0	3rd South	Won Southern Division Quarterfinal (New Orleans); Won Southern Conference Semifinal (Nashville); Lost Southern Conference Championship (Pensacola)
2006	8	0	0	1st South West	First-Round Bye in NWFA First Round; Won NWFA Quarterfinal (Cleveland); Won NWFA Semifinal (Mass.); Lost NWFA Championship (D.C.)
2007	7	1	0	1st South West	Won Southern Conference Quarterfinal (New Orleans); Won Southern Conference Semifinal (St. Louis); Lost Southern Conference Championship (Columbus)
2008	6	2	0	2nd South Central	Lost Southern Conference Quarterfinal (H-Town)
Oklahoma City Lightning (WFA)
2009	Did not play				
2010	0	2	0	--	--
Oklahoma City Lightning (WSFL)
2010	--	1	--	--	--
2011	--	--	--	--	--
Totals	58	16	0	(including playoffs)	

== 2010 Season Schedule ==
Date	Opponent	Home/Away	Result
April 10	Lone Star Mustangs	Away	Lost 0-62
April 17	Memphis Soul	Away	Lost 0-6**
April 24	Kansas City Storm	Away	
May 8	Topeka Mudcats	Away	Lost 0-6 Forfeit
May 15	Kansas City Storm	Home	
May 22	Kansas City Storm	Away	
May 29	Topeka Mudcats	Home	
June 12	Kansas City Storm	Home	
July 3	Topeka Mudcats	Away	
July 10	Topeka Mudcats	Home	

** = Forfeited
