= Palm Beach Punishers =

Women's football team in Florida, United States

- Founded: 2007
- League: IWFL (2007-2010); WFA (2011-present)
- Team history: Palm Beach Punishers (2007-present)
- Based in: Wellington, Florida
- Stadium: Palm Beach Central High School
- Colors: Black, gold, white
- Championships: 0

The Palm Beach Punishers are a football team in the Women's Football Alliance based in Palm Beach County, Florida. Home games are played on the campus of Palm Beach Central High School in nearby Wellington. The team's name and logo are a reference to comic book character The Punisher, who resided in Palm Beach in the 2004 film of the same name (in the comic series, The Punisher lives in New York City).

From their inaugural season in 2007 until 2010, the Punishers played in the Independent Women's Football League.

== Season-by-season ==
Season records
Season	W	L	T	Finish	Playoff results
Palm Beach Punishers (IWFL)
2007	1	7	0	4th East South Atlantic	--
2008	0	8	0	4th Tier II East South Atlantic	--
2009	2	6	0	11th Tier II	--
2010	1	7	0	5th Tier II East Southeast	--
Palm Beach Punishers (WFA)
2011	5	3	0	2nd National Coastal	--
2012*	--	--	--	--	--
Totals	9	31	0		

* = Current standing

== 2009 ==
=== Season schedule ===
Date	Opponent	Home/Away	Result
April 18	Orlando Mayhem	Home	Won 21–6
April 24	Miami Fury	Away	Lost 0-44
May 2	Carolina Queens	Away	Lost 14–26
May 9	Louisiana Fuel	Home	Won 28–0
May 16	Atlanta Xplosion	Away	Lost 7-77
May 23	Carolina Phoenix	Home	Lost 9–14
May 30	Orlando Mayhem	Away	Lost 25–41
June 13	Miami Fury	Home	Lost 0-53

== 2010 ==
=== Season schedule ===
Date	Opponent	Home/Away	Result
April 3	Miami Fury	Home	Lost 9-40
April 10	Carolina Phoenix	Away	Lost 0-49
April 17	Carolina Queens	Home	Lost 3–13
April 24	Louisiana Fuel	Away	Won 26–20
May 1	Miami Fury	Away	Lost 0-41
May 15	Miami Fury	Away	Lost 0-55
May 22	Carolina Phoenix	Home	Lost 14–71
June 5	Miami Fury	Home	Lost 6–14

== 2011 ==
=== Standings ===
2011 Coastal Division
	W	L	T	PCT	PF	PA	DIV	GB	STK
y-Miami Fury	7	1	0	0.875	302	89	4-0	---	W1
Palm Beach Punishers	5	3	0	0.625	164	96	2-2	2.0	L1
Tampa Bay Pirates	2	6	0	0.250	95	160	0-4	5.0	L6

=== Season schedule ===
Date	Opponent	Home/Away	Result
April 9	Jacksonville Dixie Blues	Away	Lost 12–42
April 16	Savannah Sabers	Home	Won 38–0
May 7	Tampa Bay Pirates	Home	Won 16–8
May 14	Miami Fury	Away	Lost 9–12
May 21	Savannah Sabers	Away	Won 35–0
June 4	Atlanta Heartbreakers	Home	Won 34–6
June 11	Tampa Bay Pirates	Away	Won 20–14
June 18	Miami Fury	Home	Lost 0–14

== 2012 ==
=== Season schedule ===
Date	Opponent	Home/Away	Result
April 14	Savannah Sabers	Away	Lost 28–33
April 21	Tallahassee Jewels	Home	Won 14–6
April 28	Tampa Bay Inferno	Away	Lost 0-40
May 5	Miami Fury	Away	
May 12	Orlando Anarchy	Home	
May 19	Miami Fury	Home	
June 9	Jacksonville Dixie Blues	Away	
June 16	Tampa Bay Inferno	Home	

== 2013 ==
Date	Opponent	Home/Away	Result

== 2014 ==
Date	Opponent	Home/Away	Result
