= Atlanta Xplosion =

- Founded: 2003
- League: Independent Women's Football League
- Team history: Atlanta Xplosion (2003-2010, 2012-2013); Atlanta Ravens (2011)
- Based in: Smyrna, Georgia
- Stadium: Campbell High School
- Colors: Black, red, white
- Championships: 2 (2006, 2011)

The Atlanta Xplosion, known as the Atlanta Ravens for the year of 2011, was a football team in the Independent Women's Football League. Based in Atlanta, Georgia, the Xplosion played their home games in nearby Smyrna, Georgia at Campbell High School.

== History ==
=== 2003 ===
The Xplosion was formed in 2003 as an IWFL exhibition team ("X-Team") from the players and staff of the defunct Atlanta Leopards team which played the NWFA. The Beniamino family was involved in all aspects of the team; in addition to the breadwinner Phil owning the team, his wife Denise played for the Xplosion (she played her husband's typical position of linebacker and wore his #33 uniform number). Even their daughter Kylie had her own unique role, as she was the one who first thought up the Xplosion name.

Coached by Phil, Marcus Dawson, Craig Couchoud and John Singleton and playing on the campus of Clark Atlanta University, the Xplosion had a successful exhibition season, finishing with a 9–1 record.

=== 2004 ===
2004 was the Xplosion's first year as a fully licensed IWFL team. Adding Zeric Foster and Adrian "ACE" Carney to the coaching staff, the Xplosion finished 5–3, good for second place in the South Atlantic Division and a playoff spot. Their playoff run would end soon after it began with a 21-8 divisional playoff loss to their South Atlantic divisional rivals the Tampa Bay Terminators, who had beaten the Xplosion twice in the regular season but would go on to lose to the eventual IWFL Champion New York Sharks in the Eastern Conference Finals.

=== 2005 ===
In ths year 2005 there were many changes witnessed by the Xplosion. Additionally moving to Campbell High School in nearby Smyrna, the Xplosion moved on without past coaches Marcus Dawson and John Singleton, hiring Charlene Vance, Craig Couchoud, and offensive line (who would later be head) coach Mario D'Ella. On the field, the Xplosion did even better than they had done in '04, finishing the regular season at a perfect 10–0, winning their first division title (Eastern Conference, South Central), and clinching a first-round playoff home game. Their playoff run also saw success, winning the Eastern Conference Semifinal over the Jacksonville Dixie Blues by a score of 26-12 and later dethroning the reigning IWFL Champion New York Sharks 3-0 for the Eastern Conference Championship and the right to advance to the IWFL Championship Game in Manchester, New Hampshire (hosted by the Manchester Freedom). Unfortunately, the title game was not as successful, as the Xplosion lost to the Sacramento Sirens, 9–6.

=== 2006 ===
In 2006, Phil Beniamino sold the Xplosion to Takela Corbitt, who herself had played running back and fullback for the team for three years. Beniamino and his staff would remain as coaches, leading the Xplosion to a season even better than the one before it. Not only did they finish the regular season 7–1, win another division title (South Atlantic), and win the Eastern Conference Semifinals (over the Bay State Warriors, 41–0) and Finals (over the New York Sharks, 35–14), but they also made history in the following IWFL Championship in Long Beach, California (hosted by the Long Beach Aftershock). Their opponent, the Detroit Demolition, had won 42 consecutive games dating back to their inaugural season of 2002, and had won four straight NWFA championships before joining the IWFL. Needless to say, the Xplosion put that streak to a quick end, defeating the Demolition 21-14 and becoming 2006 IWFL World Champions.

=== 2007 ===
2007, like the seasons before it, was a year of change. Moving into Roswell High School, the Xplosion promoted offensive line coach Mario D'Ella to head coach, leading to a revamping of the coaching staff; gone were Beniamino, Vance, and Couchoud, leaving only Zeric Foster from the previous coaching staff and adding Charmaine Chin, Ronald Rankin, Jody Kerse and Marco McInness. Otherwise, not much had changed from prior seasons; again finishing 8–0, winning the South Atlantic Division title, and breezing through the Eastern Conference Semifinals (defeating the D.C. Divas) and Championship (for the third straight year, defeating the New York Sharks) to advance to the IWFL Championship Game which this time they were hosting against their opponent from the year before, the Detroit Demolition. Though it was the highest-attended title game in IWFL history, the Xplosion were not as successful this time around, losing 17–7 to the Demolition (who avenged their defeat in the previous year's game).

=== 2008 ===
2008 was a disappointing year by Xplosion standards; despite finishing with a solid 6–2 record, for the first time since 2005, the Xplosion failed to win the conference title, for the first time since 2004, failed to win the division title, and for the first time since becoming a fully licensed team, failed to make the playoffs.

=== 2009 ===
For 2009, the Xplosion moved to their new home of James R. Hallford Stadium in Clarkston and their new head coach Maurice Tyler. Once again, despite a strong 7–1 record, the Xplosion failed to make the playoffs once again because of a lower Team Rating than the wild-card winners Pittsburgh Passion.

=== 2010 ===
Once again, the Xplosion finished at 7–1, which was the best record in the division. However, because of the IWFL's Team Ratings system, the 5-3 D.C. Divas won the Southeast Division title. The two teams will play in the first round of the playoffs on June 12.

=== 2011 ===
In March 2011, the team announced that the name of the team was changed from the Atlanta Xplosion to the Atlanta Ravens. The Ravens were undefeated the entire year to win a world championship.

=== 2012 ===
2012 was a rebuilding year for the Xplosion. With a strong rookie class, a few dedicated veterans, and the addition of coach Vinson Brown (Defensive Line Coach), the team went 5–2 on the season, winning their division and making the first round of the playoffs.

=== 2013 ===
The team enters the 2013 season with a largely young roster. Head coach Zeric Foster has returned, and the coaching staff has been expanded with the addition of offensive coordinator Gerald "Boo" Mitchell and returning coach Vinson Brown.

== Season-by-season ==
Season records
Season	W	L	T	Finish	Playoff results
2003	9	1	0	X-Team	--
2004	5	4	0	2nd Eastern Conference South Atlantic	Lost Eastern Conference Semifinal (Tampa Bay)
2005	12	1	0	1st Eastern Conference Southern Central	Won Eastern Conference Semifinal (Jacksonville); Won Eastern Conference Championship (New York); Lost IWFL Championship (Sacramento)
2006	10	1	0	1st Eastern Conference South Atlantic	Won Eastern Conference Semifinal (Bay State); Won Eastern Conference Championship (New York); Won IWFL Championship (Detroit)
2007	10	1	0	1st Eastern Conference South Atlantic	Won Eastern Conference Semifinal (D.C.); Won Eastern Conference Championship (New York); Lost IWFL Championship (Detroit)
2008	6	2	0	2nd Eastern Conference South Atlantic	--
2009	7	1	0	2nd Eastern Conference South Atlantic	--
2010	7	2	0	2nd Eastern Conference Southeast	Lost Eastern Conference Semifinal (D.C.)
2011	11	0	0	1st Eastern Conference Mid South	Won Eastern Conference Semifinal (Houston); Won Eastern Conference Championship (Carolina); Won IWFL Championship (California)
2012	5	2	0	1st Eastern Conference Mid South	Lost Eastern Conference Semifinal (Houston)
2013	3	1	0	2nd Eastern Conference Southeast	--
Totals	85	16	0		

== Season schedules ==
=== 2009 ===
Date	Opponent	Home/Away	Result
April 11	Clarksville Fox	Home	Won 43-0
April 18	Houston Energy	Away	Won 38-7
April 25	Chattanooga Locomotion	Home	Won 28-6
May 2	Dallas Diamonds	Home	Lost 7-32
May 16	Palm Beach Punishers	Home	Won 77-7
May 23	Miami Fury	Away	Won 16-12
June 6	Tennessee Valley Tigers	Away	Won 63-0
June 13	Orlando Mayhem	Away	Won 19-14

=== 2010 ===
Date	Opponent	Home/Away	Result
April 3	Chattanooga Locomotion	Away	Won 65-0
April 10	Carolina Queens	Away	Won 54-7
April 24	Miami Fury	Home	Won 39-0
May 1	Houston Energy	Home	Won 21-20
May 8	Dallas Diamonds	Away	Lost 3-23
May 15	Carolina Queens	Home	Won 56-0
May 22	Miami Fury	Away	Won 1-0**
May 29	Clarksville Fox	Home	Won 56-0
June 12	D.C. Divas (Southeast Division Championship)	Away	

** Won by forfeit
