= Carolina Queens =

Women's Tackle Football Team

- Founded: 2004
- League: Independent Women's Football League
- Team history: Carolina Queens WPFL (2004–2007); Carolina Queens (IWFL) (present) AWFL
- Based in: Charlotte, North Carolina
- Stadium: Hopewell High School
- Colors: Black, red, yellow gold, white
- Owner: Ebony Kimbrough
- Head coach: Ebony Kimbrough, Ron Cartier, Miriam Key-Parker, Lawrence Brewton
- Championships: 3

The Carolina Queens is a women's American tackle football team based out of Charlotte, North Carolina playing in the American Women's Football League and owned by Ebony Kimbrough. Home games are played on the campus of Rocky River High School

From 2004 to 2007, the Queens were part of the Women's Professional Football League. They have also played in the Independent Women’s Football League (IWFL). They currently play in the Apex Division of the Southwest Conference of the American Women's Football League.

== Season-by-season ==
Season records
Season	W	L	T	Finish	Playoff results
Carolina Queens (WPFL)
2005	0	6	0	4th National North	--
2006	2	6	0	3rd National North	--
2007	1	6	0	3rd National North	--
Carolina Queens (IWFL)
2008	4	4	0	2nd IWFL2 Southern South Atlantic	--
2009	7	2	0	1st IWFL2	Lost IWFL2 League Quarterfinal (Carolina Phoenix)
2010	1	7	0	6th IWFL2 Eastern Southeast	--
2012	6	1	0	Affiliate Team	Won Tier III Bowl (Colorado)
2013	5	4	0	Affiliate Team	Won Tier III Bowl (San Antonio)
2014	6	3	0	2nd Eastern South Atlantic	Won Legacy Bowl (Minnesota)
2015	7	3	0	2nd Eastern South Atlantic	Won Eastern Conference Quarterfinal (Toledo); Lost Eastern Conference Semifinal (Carolina Phoenix)
2016	4	4	0	4th Eastern Atlantic	--
Totals	43	46	0	(including playoffs)	

== Season schedules ==
=== 2009 ===
Date	Opponent	Home/Away	Result
April 11	Cape Fear Thunder	Away	Won 66-0
April 18	Cape Fear Thunder	Home	Won 59-0
April 25	Jersey Justice	Away	Won 28-20
May 2	Palm Beach Punishers	Home	Won 26-14
May 9	Louisville Nightmare	Away	Won 2-0**
May 23	Chattanooga Locomotion	Home	Won 30-12
May 30	Carolina Phoenix	Away	Lost 0-8
June 13	Carolina Phoenix	Home	Won 36-20
June 27	Carolina Phoenix (Tier II Quarterfinal)	Home	Lost 16-26

** = Won by forfeit

=== 2010 ===
Date	Opponent	Home/Away	Result
April 3	Carolina Phoenix	Home	Lost 2-26
April 10	Atlanta Xplosion	Home	Lost 7-54
April 17	Palm Beach Punishers	Away	Won 13-3
May 1	Baltimore Nighthawks	Home	
May 8	Carolina Phoenix	Away	
May 15	Atlanta Xplosion	Away	
May 22	Chattanooga Locomotion	Home	
June 5	Chattanooga Locomotion	Away	
