= Emerald Coast Barracudas =

- Founded: 2002
- League: Women's Football Alliance
- Team history: Panama City Beach Rumble (NWFA) 2002–2003; Emerald Coast Sharks (NWFA) 2005; Emerald Coast Barracudas (NWFA) 2006–2008; Emerald Coast Barracudas (WFA) 2009–present
- Based in: Panama City Beach, Florida
- Arena: Pete Edwards Field
- Colors: Blue, silver, white
- President: David L. Freeland
- Head coach: David L. Freeland
- Championships: 0

The Emerald Coast Barracudas were a women's American football team in the Women's Football Alliance. Previously a member of the National Women's Football Association and known as the Panama City Beach Rumble and the Emerald Coast Sharks, they were based in Panama City, Florida (along Florida's Emerald Coast). They played their home games at Pete Edwards Field.

== Season-By-Season ==
Season records
Season	W	L	T	Finish	Playoff results
Panama City Beach Rumble (NWFA)
2002	1	7	0	4th South	--
2003	4	4	0	3rd Southern	--
2004	Did not play				
Emerald Coast Sharks (NWFA)
2005	0	8	0	14th Southern	--
Emerald Coast Barracudas (NWFA)
2006	1	7	0	4th Southern Southeast	--
2007	0	8	0	4th Southern South	--
2008	0	8	0	4th Southern Southeast	--
Emerald Coast Barracudas (WFA)
2009	0	8	0	5th American Southeast	--
Totals	6	50	0		

== 2009 Season Schedule ==
Date	Opponent	Home/Away	Result
April 18	Jacksonville Dixie Blues	Home	Lost 16-64
April 25	Memphis Belles	Away	Lost 0-50
May 2	Gulf Coast Riptide	Home	Lost 8-66
May 16	New Orleans Blaze	Home	Lost 20-39
May 30	Memphis Belles	Home	Lost 12-44
June 6	Jacksonville Dixie Blues	Away	
June 20	Gulf Coast Riptide	Away	
June 27	New Orleans Blaze	Away	
