= Memphis Belles =

- Founded: 2008
- League: Independent Women's Football League
- Team history: NWFA (2008); WFA (2009); IWFL (2010-future)
- Based in: Memphis, Tennessee
- Colors: Red, black, silver
- Championships: 0

The Memphis Belles were a women's professional tackle football team and members of the Independent Women's Football League. Based in Memphis, Tennessee, the Memphis Belles played their 2010 home games at Halle Stadium football field in Memphis, Tennessee.

In their inaugural season (2008), the Memphis Belles played in the National Women's Football Association. When the NWFA folded in 2009, the Memphis Belles moved to the Women's Football Alliance. In 2010, the Memphis Belles moved to the Independent Women's Football League, where they made the Midwest Divisional Playoffs. The team has since folded.

== Season-by-season ==
Season records
Season	W	L	T	Finish	Playoff results
Memphis Belles (NWFA)
2008	3	4	1	2nd South Midwest	--
Memphis Belles (WFA)
2009	4	4	0	3rd American Southeast	--
Memphis Belles (IWFL)
2010	5	3	0	1st West Midwest	--
Totals	12	11	1	(including playoffs)	

* = Current Standing

== Season schedules ==
=== 2009 ===
Date	Opponent	Home/Away	Result
April 18	New Orleans Blaze	Home	Won 46-7
April 25	Emerald Coast Barracudas	Home	Won 50-0
May 9	Jacksonville Dixie Blues	Away	Lost 20-34
May 16	Gulf Coast Riptide	Away	Lost 8-50
May 30	Emerald Coast Barracudas	Away	Won 44-12
June 6	New Orleans Blaze	Away	Won 32-26
June 13	Gulf Coast Riptide	Home	Lost 20-54
June 20	Jacksonville Dixie Blues	Home	Lost 6-34

=== 2010 ===
Date	Opponent	Home/Away	Result
April 10	Tennessee Valley Tigers	Away	Won 28-0
April 17	Chattanooga Locomotion	Home	Lost 0-14
April 24	Clarksville Fox	Away	Win 18-12
May 1	Dallas Diamonds	Home	Lost 6-49
May 8	Chattanooga Locomotion	Away	Lost 16-22
May 22	H-Town Texas Cyclones	Home	Win 1-0
June 5	Clarksville Fox	Home	Win 8-6
April 3	Louisville Nightmare	Away	win 1-0
