= Orlando Starz =

The Orlando Starz were a franchise in the Independent Women's Football League from 2000 to 2004 based in Orlando, Florida. The team won a division championship in 2001, but struggled in 2003, compiling a 1-7 record. However, the Starz received media attention due to Charlotte Chambers, at that time, a 69-year-old defensive back dubbed the "Gridiron Granny."

Her story received play in multiple media outlets, and she appeared on numerous sports talk shows, including "The Best Damn Sports Show, Period" where she tackled Tom Arnold. She also appeared on Jimmy Kimmel where she tackled Ryan Seacrest, The Steve Harvey Show The Wayne Brady Show, CBS Early Show, David Letterman and many more.

The Starz were off to a 2-1 start in 2004 when owner Marsha Beatty suspended operations in April 2004 due to "internal conflict."

From 1999 until 2002 there was another "Orlando Starz" football team-this team was a men's Adult Semi Professional football team. The men's Starz donned uniforms much like the NFL Dallas Cowboys with blue and silver.
