= Atlanta Phoenix =

Women's tackle football team

- Founded: 2011
- League: Women's National Football Conference
- Team history: Atlanta Phoenix (2012–present)
- Based in: Atlanta, Georgia
- Stadium: Decatur High Stadium
- Colors: Blue Flame, Orange Flame, White
- Owners: April Christler, Moncrief Hart, Evin Felder, Carla Odom
- Coaches: Moncrief Hart, Craig Davis, Avis Womba, Christopher Harden, Jamal Walton, Edward Boone, Jordan Peck, Will Black, Denee Walker
- Championships: 0
- Mascot: Phoenix

The Atlanta Phoenix was a women’s tackle football team of the Women's National Football Conference that began play in 2012. Based in Atlanta, Georgia, the team plays its home games at Decatur High Stadium in Downtown Decatur, Georgia.

== Season-by-season ==
Season records
Season	W	L	T	Finish	Playoff results
2012	8	2	0	1st National Southeast	Won National Conference Wild Card (Tallahassee); Lost National Conference Quarterfinal (Jacksonville)
2013	10	1	0	1st National Southeast	Won National Conference Wild Card (Tampa Bay); Won National Conference Quarterfinal (Miami); Lost National Conference Semifinal (Chicago)
2014	7	3	0	1st National Southeast	Won National Conference Wild Card (Tampa Bay); Lost National Conference Quarterfinal (Miami)
2015	6	5	0	2nd National North Atlantic	Won National Conference Quarterfinal (Jacksonville); Lost National Conference Semifinal (D.C.); Lost Alliance Bowl (Central Cal)
2016	5	4	0	5th National	Lost National Conference Quarterfinal (Pittsburgh)
Totals	36	15	0		

== 2012 ==
=== Season schedule ===
Date	Opponent	Home/Away	Result
April 14	Carolina Raging Wolves	Home	W 48–7
April 21	Miami Fury	Away	W 48–32
April 28	Savannah Sabers	Home	W 57–13
May 5	Carolina Raging Wolves	Away	W 62–0
May 12	Memphis Dynasty	Away	W 19–6
May 19	Tampa Bay Inferno	Home	L 25–26
June 2	Gulf Coast Riptide	Home	W 1–0
June 16	Savannah Sabers	Away	W 41–14
