= Jacksonville Dixie Blues =

American women's football team

- Sport: Women's Professional Tackle Football
- Founded: 2001
- League: Women's Football Alliance
- Team history: WAFL (2001); WFA (2002); IWFL (2004–2005); WFL (2006–2007); WFA (2009–present)
- Based in: Jacksonville, Florida
- Stadium: University Christian School
- Colors: Royal Blue, White, Neon Green
- President: Brandi Bass
- Head coach: Darin Damron
- Championships: 3 (2002, 2006, 2007)
- Website: www.dixiebluesfootball.com

The Jacksonville Dixie Blues are a women's American football team based in Jacksonville, Florida. Founded in 2001, they are currently members of the Women's Football Alliance (WFA), playing their home games on the campus of University Christian School.

== History ==
The Dixie Blues were former members of the now disbanded Women's American Football League, where they were runners-up in the first championship game in 2001 and won the title in 2002. After the league disbanded, they joined the Women's Football Association; they won the league championship in 2003. The league folded after that single season and the team spent the next two seasons in the Independent Women's Football League. The Dixie Blues then moved to the Women's Football League, where they won the 2006 and 2007 titles.

They were planning to join the National Women's Football Association in 2009, but have instead become one of the charter franchises in the Women's Football Alliance. So far, the Dixie Blues' WFA tenure has been extremely successful, winning three straight division titles. Until 2013, the Dixie Blues were the only WFA charter member never to have lost a regular-season game in league play. As of the end of the 2017 regular season, their current record stands at 136–24. The Dixie Blues begin their 18th season in April 2018.

== Season-by-season ==
Season records
Season	W	L	T	Finish	Playoff results
Jacksonville Dixie Blues (WAFL)
2001	5	5	0	3rd South Atlantic	Won Atlantic Conference Semifinal (Indianapolis); Won Atlantic Conference Championship (Tampa Bay); Lost WAFL Championship (California)
Jacksonville Dixie Blues (WFA (2002))
2002	9	1	0	--	Won Southern Conference Final (Orlando Fire); Won WFA Championship (Indianapolis)
Jacksonville Dixie Blues (IWFL)
2004	5	1	0	X-Team	--
2005	8	2	0	1st East South Atlantic	Lost Eastern Conference Semifinal (Atlanta)
Jacksonville Dixie Blues (WFL)
2006	10	0	0	1st League	Won WFL Semifinal (Mississippi); Won WFL Championship (Tennessee)
2007	6	0	0	1st League	Won WFL Championship (Clarksville)
2008	Did not play				
Jacksonville Dixie Blues (WFA)
2009	8	0	0	1st American Southeast	Won American Conference Semifinal (Austin); Lost American Conference Championship (St. Louis)
2010	8	0	0	1st National South Central	Won National Conference Quarterfinal (Central Florida); Lost National Conference Semifinal (St. Louis)
2011	8	0	0	1st National South Atlantic	Won National Conference Quarterfinal (Miami); Lost National Conference Semifinal (Indy)
2012	8	0	0	1st WFA National 9	Won National Conference Quarterfinal (Atlanta); Lost National Conference Semifinal (Chicago)
Totals	86	15	0	(including playoffs)	

* = current standing

== 2009 ==
=== Season schedule ===
Date	Opponent	Home/Away	Result
April 18	Emerald Coast Barracudas	Home	Won 64-16
May 2	New Orleans Blaze	Away	Won 46-0
May 9	Memphis Belles	Home	Won 34-20
May 30	Gulf Coast Riptide	Away	Won 49-36
June 6	Emerald Coast Barracudas	Home	Won 1-0**
June 13	New Orleans Blaze	Home	Won 42-0
June 20	Memphis Belles	Away	Won 34-6
June 27	Gulf Coast Riptide	Home	Won 37-14
July 11	Austin Outlaws (American Conference Semifinal)	Home	Won 55-14
July 25	St. Louis Slam (American Conference Championship)	Away	Lost 32-40

** = Won by forfeit

== 2010 ==
=== Season schedule ===
Date	Opponent	Home/Away	Result
April 10	Central Florida Anarchy	Away	Won 41-13
April 17	Central Florida Anarchy	Home	Won 29-7
April 24	Tampa Bay Pirates	Away	Won 63-0
May 1	Carolina Raging Wolves	Home	Won 45-6
May 8	Carolina Raging Wolves	Away	Won 48-16
May 15	Central Florida Anarchy	Home	Won 47-13
June 5	Tampa Bay Pirates	Home	Won 42-5
June 12	Carolina Raging Wolves	Away	Won 48-6
June 26	Central Florida Anarchy (National Conference Quarterfinal)	Home	Won 47-13
July 10	St. Louis Slam (National Conference Semifinal)	Home	Lost 26-52

== 2011 ==
=== Standings ===
2011 South Atlantic Division
	W	L	T	PCT	PF	PA	DIV	GB	STK
y-Jacksonville Dixie Blues	8	0	0	1.000	328	70	4-0	---	W8
Orlando Anarchy	5	3	0	0.625	168	139	2-2	3.0	W3
Gulf Coast Riptide	3	5	0	0.375	174	216	0-4	5.0	W1

=== Season schedule ===
Date	Opponent	Home/Away	Result
April 2	Savannah Sabers	Away	Won 52-6
April 9	Palm Beach Punishers	Home	Won 42-12
April 16	Orlando Anarchy	Away	Won 42-7
April 30	Gulf Coast Riptide	Away	Won 21-14
May 14	Orlando Anarchy	Home	Won 49-0
May 21	Gulf Coast Riptide	Home	Won 43-0
June 11	Miami Fury	Home	Won 45-24
June 18	Tampa Bay Pirates	Away	Won 34-7
June 25	Miami Fury (National Conference Quarterfinal)	Home	Won 20-18
July 9	Indy Crash (National Conference Semifinal)	Home	Lost 0-42

== 2012 ==
=== Season schedule ===
Date	Opponent	Home/Away	Result
April 14	Miami Fury	Away	Won 20-0
April 21	Orlando Anarchy	Home	Won 31-3
April 28	Gulf Coast Riptide	Home	Won 49-6
May 5	Tampa Bay Inferno	Away	Won 35-6
May 19	Orlando Anarchy	Away	Won 33-6
June 2	Carolina Raging Wolves	Away	Won 46-0
June 9	Palm Beach Punishers	Home	Won 1-0**
June 16	Miami Fury	Home	Won 1-0**
June 30	Atlanta Phoenix (National Conference Quarterfinal)	Home	Won 49-41
July 7	Chicago Force (National Conference Semifinal)	Away	Lost 67-14
