= Huntsville Tigers =

Women's American football team

The Huntsville Tigers is a women's American football team located in Huntsville, Alabama. The Tigers played their first season of full-contact football in the spring of 2012. This was the Tigers' first season as a new team. The team consists of former Alabama Renegades and Tennessee Valley Tigers players as well as a number of new players.

== History ==
=== Alabama Renegades ===
Women's football has existed in the Huntsville area since the fall of 2000 when the Alabama Renegades first came into existence. The Renegades were one of the founding teams of the National Women's Football Association (NWFA). In the fall 2000, the Alabama Renegades and the Nashville Dream played a six-game exhibition season to determine the viability of a women's full-contact football league. The exhibition games were a huge success and the National Women's Football Association (NWFA) expanded to 12 teams in its first full season of play in the spring of 2001. Ray Quinn was the man who first brought full-contact football to Huntsville and he owned the team for two years.

Nancy Byrd, a Renegades player, took over the team from Quinn in 2003. Byrd continued to play for the Renegades while owning the team. At the end of the 2008 season Byrd retired from playing and put the team up for sale. Byrd later stated: "I decided to retire from playing and no one was willing to take on the responsibility of running this team. I appreciate the opportunity Ray and Catherine Masters (NWFA founder) gave me to play football", stated Byrd. The NWFA league ceased operations that same year.

=== Tennessee Valley Tigers ===
Huntsville Tigers
- Colors: Black, Silver, Purple
- Owner: Carlos Mathews

Carlos Mathews, the former offensive coordinator for the Renegades, realized the potential for women's football in the Huntsville area and decided to explore ways to bring the game back for a 2009 season. Mathews researched several leagues but only found one with the stability needed to support women's football in the Huntsville Area. The Tigers officially joined the Independent Women's Football League (IWFL) on August 12, 2008, as a Tier II team. On October 24, 2011, after learning that Carlos Matthews wasn't bringing the team back, former player Carmelesia Sullivan looked into forming a team.

=== Huntsville Tigers ===
Sullivan formed the Huntsville Tigers from former Tennessee Valley Tigers players. In the first season of play, the Tigers finished with a 5–3 record, losing twice to the Chattanooga Locomotion - another Tier II team - and once to the Atlanta Xplosion - a Tier I team in 2009. The Tigers also defeated then ranked number seven Clarksville Fox who in the 2008 season had competed for the Independent Women's Football League Tier II championship. The Tigers played their home games at Milton Frank Stadium in Huntsville, Alabama. Because of the devastating effects of the 2011 Super Outbreak, the Tigers had to forfeit their final two regular-season games. On August 30, the Tigers announced they had left the IWFL to join the WSFL.

== Season-by-season ==
Season records
Season	W	L	T	Finish	Playoff results
2000	3	3	0	Exhibition Season	--
2001	5	3	0	2nd Southern	--
2002	7	2	0	1st Central	Lost Southern Conference Semifinal (Pensacola)
2003	7	4	0	2nd Southern Central	Won Southern Conference Quarterfinal (Asheville); Lost Southern Conference Semifinal (Pensacola)
2004	6	3	0	2nd Southern Gulf Coast	--
2005	5	3	0	7th Southern	--
2006	4	4	0	3rd Southern Southeast	--
2007	3	5	0	3rd Southern Central	--
2008	2	6	0	4th Southern East	--
Totals	42	33	0		

Season records
Season	W	L	T	Finish	Playoff results
Tennessee Valley Tigers (IWFL)
2009	5	3	0	10th Tier II	--
2010	4	4	0	3rd Tier II East Southeast	--
2011	1	7	0	5th East Mid-South	--
Tennessee Valley Tigers (WSFL)
2012*	--	--	--	--	--
Totals	10	14	0		

* = Current Standing

== 2011 schedule ==
Date	Opponent	Home/Away	Time	Event title	Result
April 9	Memphis Belles	Away	7pm	N/A	L, 12-16
April 16	Clarksville Fox	Away	7pm	N/A	L, 6-32
April 23	Georgia Peachez	Home	7pm	TBA	W, 2-0**
April 30	Bye				
May 7	Memphis Belles	Home	4pm	TBA	L, 6-32
May 14	Clarksville Fox	Home	7pm	N/A	L, 6-12
May 21	Clarksville Fox	Home	7pm	TBA	L, 6-22
May 28	Chattanooga Locomotion	Away	7pm	Battle for the Border Rivalry Game	L, 0-2***
June 4	Bye				
June 11	Atlanta Xplosion	Home	7pm	TBA	L, 0-2

** = Won by forfeit *** = Forfeited

== Single season records ==
Date	Name	Record	Result
2009	Alber, Marty	Season Passing Leader	917 yards
2009	Alber, Marty	Season Passing TD Leader	15
2009	Bady, Starry	Season Receiving TD Leader	4
2009	Harvey, Stephanie	Season Receiving Leader	210 yards
2009	Suttles, Marsheka	Season Rushing TD Leader	6
2009	White, Katie	Field Goal Leader	2
2009	White, Katie	Extra Point Completed	16
2009	Bady, Starry	Interception Yards	55 yards
2009	Hendrix, Danielle	Leading Tackler	41
2009	Team Offense	Most Points in a Single Game	68
2009	Team Defense	Most shutouts in a season	4
2010	White, Katie	Longest Kickoff Return for TD	70 yards
2010	Eatman, Dionne	Season Rushing Yards Leader	496 yards
2010	Eatman, Dionne	Single Game Rushing Yards	174 yards

== 2011 roster ==
Player	Position	Number
Carmela Sullivan	DB	22
Carmelesia Sullivan	DB	23
Carson Wakefield	OL	84
Cheronda "Rock" Phillips	RB	50
Christina Whitney	DB/K	51
Lauren "LC" Coleman	DB	9
Sharessa "TJ" Allen	DB	82
Sonia Leggs	RB/WR	34
Franchesca Atkins	QB/WR/CB	
Nina Cook	RB/WR	TBA
Shelley Drake	DE	TBA
Chasity Herron	WR/LB	TBA
Becky Hensel	QB/WR	TBA
Hayley Howard	LB	55
Monique Jefferson	OL/DT	TBA
Shana Levett	CB	TBA
Heidi McQuire	DL/OL/FB	TBA
Mosheda Pettus	TE/DE	TBA
Yvette Price	TBA	TBA
Aisha Robinson	C/OL	TBA
Jayme Truitt	WR/CB	TBA
Liz Wilson	QB/WR/CB	TBA

=== 2012 season ===
Reg Schedule	Home	Away	Score
4/28	Huntsville Tigers	Memphis Dynasty	16-6 L
5/28	Huntsville Tigers	Arkansas Rampage	32-0 W
5/12	Carolina Queens	Huntsville Tigers	22-19 L
6/2	Arkansas Rampage	Huntsville Tigers	41-0 W
6/9	Cape Fear Thunder	Huntsville Tigers	40-0 W
6/23	Huntsville Tigers	Cape Fear Thunder	50-0 W
6/30	Tri-State Bruisers	Huntsville Tigers	2-0 W
7/7	Huntsville Tigers	Tri-State Bruisers	2-0 W
Playoffs
7/21	Game won due to forfeit of other team		2-0 W
7/28	New Jersey Titans	Huntsville Tigers	26-6 L

== Staff ==
- Owner/Offensive Coordinator - Carlos Mathews
- Offensive Line Coach - Ella Banghart
- Assistant Defensive Coach - JJ Johnson
- Delegate - Brady Wakefield
- Marketing/Sales - Jamie Flynt
- Acting General Manager - Carson Wakefield
