= Nashville Dream =

Professional women's American football team

- Founded: 2000
- League: National Women's Football Association
- Team history: NWFA (2000–2007)
- Based in: Nashville, Tennessee
- Colors: Blue, red, silver
- Head coach: Ben Eakin
- Championships: 0

The Nashville Dream was a women's professional American football team based in Nashville, Tennessee. They were one of the founding teams of the National Women's Football Association. The team was active from 2000 to 2007 and last played at the Glencliff High School football field.

== History ==
The Nashville Dream was established by Catherine Masters in 2000 as one of the two founding teams of the National Women's Football Association. The first season consisted of six exhibition games between the Nashville Dream and the Alabama Renegades, with each team winning three games. Masters sold the team in 2001 to team quarterback Christie Trost. After a disappointing 2001 season, the team qualified for the league playoffs every year until 2006, although they never made it to a championship game. Despite their successful record, the franchise was plagued by low attendance and financial insolvency. In December 2005, Head Coach Ben Eakin bought the team from Trost and attempted to resuscitate attendance levels by lowering ticket prices and increasing marketing efforts. The franchise folded two years later.

== Season-by-season results ==
Year	Division	Reg. season	Playoffs
2007	Southern - Central	2–6–0	Did not qualify
2006	South Central	0–8–0	Did not qualify
2005	Southern	8–0–0	0–1–0
2004	Southern	7–1–0	0–1–0
2003	Southern	5–3–0	0–1–0
2002	Southern	7–1–0	0–1–0
2001	Southern	2–7–0	Did not qualify
