= Boston Militia =

Women's American football team

- Founded: 2007
- Disbanded: 2015
- League: IWFL (2008-2010); WFA (2011-2015)
- Team history: Boston Militia (2008-2015)
- Based in: Somerville, Massachusetts
- Stadium: Dilboy Stadium, Somerville High School
- Colors: Red, Black, white
- President: Ernie Boch, Jr.
- Head coach: Derrick Beasley
- Championships: 3; 2010 (IWFL); 2011, 2014 (WFA)

The Boston Militia were a women's full-contact football team in the Women's Football Alliance of which they were two-time champions (2011, 2014). Previously, the Militia played in the Independent Women's Football League from 2008 until 2010, winning the IWFL championship in 2010. Based in Boston, Massachusetts, the Militia played its home games at Dilboy Stadium in nearby Somerville.

On January 5, 2015, the team announced they were discontinuing operations due to a lack of teams to play against in the region. Following a transfer of ownership, the team has been reorganized as the Boston Renegades.

== Season-by-season ==
Season records
Season	W	L	T	Finish	Playoff results
Boston Militia (IWFL)
2008	6	2	0	T-2nd Tier 1 Eastern North Atlantic	--
2009	8	0	0	1st Tier 1 Eastern North Atlantic	Won Eastern Conference Semifinal (Dallas); Lost Eastern Conference Championship (D.C.)
2010	8	0	0	1st Tier 1 Eastern Northeast	Won Eastern Conference Semifinal (New York); Won Eastern Conference Championship (D.C.); Won IWFL World Championship (Sacramento)
Boston Militia (WFA)
2011	7	1	0	1st National North	Won National Conference Quarterfinal (D.C.); Won National Conference Semifinal (Chicago); Won National Conference Championship (Indy); Won WFA National Championship (San Diego)
2012	8	0	0	1st National Division 2	Won National Conference Quarterfinal (New York); Won National Conference Semifinal (D.C.); Lost National Conference Championship (Chicago)
2013	8	0	0	1st National Division 1	Won National Conference Quarterfinal (Pittsburgh); Won National Conference Semifinal (D.C.); Lost National Conference Championship (Chicago)
2014	7	0	0	1st National Northeast	Won National Conference Quarterfinal (Cleveland); Won National Conference Semifinal (D.C.); Won National Conference Championship (Chicago); Won WFA National Championship (San Diego)
Totals	68	6	0	(including playoffs)	

== 2008 ==
=== Recap ===
The Boston Militia opened their inaugural season on April 12, 2008, with a home win against the D.C. Divas 27–22. The Militia finished with a 6–2 regular-season record in the Independent Women's Football League (IWFL).

=== Schedule ===
Date	Opponent	Home/Away	Result
April 12	D.C. Divas	Home	Won 27–22
April 26	Pittsburgh Passion	Away	Lost 8-34
May 3	Central PA Vipers	Away	Won 48–0
May 10	New York Sharks	Home	Lost 24–25
May 17	New York Sharks	Away	Won 28–14
May 31	Manchester Freedom	Home	Won 38–7
June 7	Montreal Blitz	Home	Won 30–20
June 14	Baltimore Nighthawks	Away	Won 28–6

=== Standings ===
2008 IWFL North Atlantic Division
	W	L	T	PCT	PF	PA	DIV	GB	STK
y - Pittsburgh Passion	8	0	0	1.000	290	81	6-0	---	W8
Boston Militia	6	2	0	0.750	231	129	4-2	2	W4
New York Sharks	6	2	0	0.750	226	122	6-2	2	W2
D.C. Divas	4	4	0	0.500	230	108	4-4	4	L1
Baltimore Nighthawks	2	6	0	0.250	156	212	1-6	6	L1
Central PA Vipers	0	8	0	0.000	0	346	0-7	8	L8

y - clinched division title
z - clinched playoff berth

The Boston Militia finished the season with the league's fifth highest Massey Rating of 1.38.

== 2009 ==
=== Recap ===
In their second season, the Militia went undefeated in the regular season with an 8–0 record. In the divisional playoffs round, Boston defeated the defending IWFL champion Dallas Diamonds 34–14 at Dilboy Stadium. Then the Militia also hosted the Conference Championship, but lost to the D.C. Divas 21–27, ending Boston's season just one victory short of the league title game.

=== Schedule ===
Date	Opponent	Home/Away	Result
April 18	Manchester Freedom	Home	Won 42–0
April 25	New York Sharks	Away	Won 21–7
May 2	Connecticut Crushers	Home	Won 47–0
May 9	Montreal Blitz	Away	Won 39–0
May 16	Philadelphia Firebirds	Home	Won 60–0
May 30	Baltimore Nighthawks	Away	Won 68–0
June 6	New York Nemesis	Home	Won 49–12
June 13	New England Intensity	Away	Won 60–0
June 27	Dallas Diamonds (Eastern Conference Semifinal)	Home	Won 34–14
July 11	D.C. Divas (Eastern Conference Championship)	Home	Lost 21–27

=== Standings ===
2009 IWFL North Atlantic Division
	W	L	T	PCT	MR	OR	DIV	GB	STK
y - Boston Militia	8	0	0	1.000	2.014	3.914	4-0	---	W8
New York Sharks	4	4	0	0.500	1.269	2.598	3-1	4	W1
New York Nemesis	5	3	0	0.625	0.848	2.148	2-2	3	W1
Philadelphia Firebirds	1	7	0	0.125	0.058	1.083	1-3	7	L6
Connecticut Crushers	1	7	0	0.125	-0.619	-0.169	0-4	7	W1

y - clinched division title
z - clinched playoff berth The Boston Militia finished with the league's third highest Massey Rating of 1.67.

== 2010 ==
=== Recap ===
In their third season, the Boston Militia posted an 8–0 record in the regular season (with one victory coming by forfeit). They then hosted a divisional playoff game versus the New York Sharks, prevailing 26–6. After shutting out the D.C. Divas 28–0 at Dilboy Stadium in the Eastern Conference championship game, the Militia defeated the Sacramento Sirens 39–7 on July 24, 2010, in Round Rock, Texas to win the IWFL World Championship. It is the franchise's first national championship title.

=== Schedule ===
Date	Opponent	Home/Away	Result
April 3	New York Nemesis	Away	Won 56–6
April 10	Connecticut Crushers	Home	Won 59–10
April 24	Pittsburgh Passion	Home	Won 27–0
May 1	D.C. Divas	Away	Won 42–35
May 8	New York Nemesis	Away	Won 40–0
May 15	New York Sharks	Home	Won 31–0
May 22	Philadelphia Firebirds	Away	Won by forfeit
June 5	D.C. Divas	Home	Won 52–36
June 12	New York Sharks (Northeast Division Championship)	Home	Won 26–6
July 10	D.C. Divas (Eastern Conference Championship)	Home	Won 28–0
July 24	Sacramento Sirens (IWFL World Championship)	Neutral (Round Rock, TX)	Won 39–7

=== Standings ===
2010 IWFL Northeast Division
	W	L	T	PCT	MR	OR	DIV	GB	STK
y - Boston Militia	8	0	0	1.000	1.816	2.816	5-0	---	W8
z - New York Sharks	6	2	0	0.778	1.271	2.049	3-1	2	W2
Pittsburgh Passion	4	4	0	0.500	0.704	1.204	1-3	4	L2
New York Nemesis	3	5	0	0.375	0.086	0.461	1-2	5	W1
Philadelphia Firebirds	1	7	0	0.125	-0.736	-0.611	0-4	7	L2

y - clinched division title
z - clinched playoff berth The Boston Militia finished the season with a Massey Rating of 2.14.

== 2011 ==
=== Recap ===
In their fourth season, the Militia joined the Women's Football Alliance (WFA) and finished the regular season at 7–1 to earn a playoff berth. Boston defeated the D.C. Divas 37–24 on the road in a conference quarterfinal game. The Militia then traveled to Chicago to defeat the Chicago Force 50–23 in a conference semifinal game. By virtue of an upset in the other conference semifinal game, Boston was able to host the WFA National Conference Championship against the Indy Crash. Boston prevailed 46–18 to earn its second consecutive trip to a league title game. On July 30, 2011, in Bedford, Texas, the Boston Militia toppled the previously undefeated San Diego Surge 34–19 to win the WFA National Championship. Halfback Whitney Zelee was named the game's Most Valuable Player. It is the franchise's second national championship title.

Head Coach Derrick Beasley received the WFA Coach of the Year Award, and quarterback Allison Cahill received the WFA National Conference Offensive Player of the Year Award.

=== Schedule ===
Date	Opponent	Home/Away	Result
April 2	D.C. Divas	Away	Lost 20–35
April 16	New York Sharks	Home	Won 28–7
April 30	Northeastern Nitro	Home	Won 72–0
May 7	New England Nightmare	Away	Won 62–0
May 14	Northeastern Nitro	Away	Won 42–0
May 21	New York Sharks	Away	Won 43–6
June 4	Philadelphia Liberty Belles	Home	Won 70–8
June 11	D.C. Divas	Home	Won 27–16
June 25	D.C. Divas (National Conference Quarterfinal)	Away	Won 37–24
July 9	Chicago Force (National Conference Semifinal)	Away	Won 50–23
July 16	Indy Crash (National Conference Championship)	Home	Won 46–18
July 30	San Diego Surge (WFA National Championship)	Neutral (Bedford, TX)	Won 34–19

=== Standings ===
2011 WFA North Division
	W	L	T	PCT	PF	PA	DIV	GB	STK
y - Boston Militia	7	1	0	0.875	364	72	5-0	---	W7
z - New York Sharks	5	3	0	0.625	212	177	3-2	2.0	L1
Northeastern Nitro	4	4	0	0.500	46	243	2-3	3.0	L1
New England Nightmare	0	8	0	0.000	28	264	0-5	7.0	L8

y - clinched division title
z - clinched playoff berth The Boston Militia finished the season with the league's highest Massey Rating of 2.27.

== 2012 ==
=== Recap ===
In their fifth season, the Boston Militia posted an 8–0 record in the regular season. After defeating the New York Sharks 47–6 at home in a conference quarterfinal game, Boston faced the D.C. Divas in the conference semifinals, prevailing at Dilboy Stadium 55–34. The Militia then traveled to Lazier Field to meet the Chicago Force in the WFA National Conference championship. Emerging from halftime facing a 21-point deficit, a remarkable comeback by the Militia fell short by a missed extra point attempt. The final score was 34–35, ending Boston's season just one victory short of the league title game.

=== Schedule ===
Date	Opponent	Home/Away	Result
April 14	New York Sharks	Home	Won 64–6
April 21	Philadelphia Liberty Belles	Away	Won 59–0
April 28	Keystone Assault	Away	Won 31–0
May 12	Philadelphia Liberty Belles	Home	Won 62–0
May 19	D.C. Divas	Home	Won 44–7
June 2	Maine Lynx	Home	Won 65–0
June 9	D.C. Divas	Away	Won 32–25
June 16	New York Sharks	Away	Won 55–12
June 30	New York Sharks (National Conference Quarterfinal)	Home	Won 47–6
July 7	D.C. Divas (National Conference Semifinal)	Home	Won 55–34
July 21	Chicago Force (National Conference Final)	Away	Lost 34–35

=== Standings ===
2012 WFA Division 2
	W	L	T	PCT	PF	PA	DIV	GB	STK
y - Boston Militia	8	0	0	1.000	458	139	4-0	---	W8
z - New York Sharks	4	4	0	0.500	104	227	2-2	4	W2
Philadelphia Liberty Belles	2	6	0	0.250	30	234	0-3	6	L3

y - clinched division title
z - clinched division title The Boston Militia finished the season with the league's second highest Massey Rating of 2.31.

== 2013 ==
=== Recap ===
In their sixth season, the Boston Militia posted an 8–0 record in a regular season highlighted by two record-setting performances. The Boston Militia and the D.C. Divas shattered the women's football record for most combined points in a single game, with an 81–54 final score on May 18, 2013. And Militia running back Whitney Zelee eclipsed the 2,000-yard benchmark and set new league records of 2,138 rushing yards over the eight-game regular season and 2,832 rushing yards over the entire championship season. Zelee's achievements earned her the National Conference MVP Award. After defeating the Pittsburgh Passion 63–28 at home in the National Conference quarterfinals, Boston faced the D.C. Divas in the conference semifinals, prevailing at Dilboy Stadium 58–34. The Militia then traveled to Lazier Field to meet the Chicago Force in the WFA National Conference championship. The Militia fell to the favored Force team 27–46, ending Boston's season just one victory short of the league title game for the second year in a row.

=== Schedule ===
Date	Opponent	Home/Away	Result
April 13	New York Sharks	Home	Won 70–0
April 20	Montreal Blitz	Home	Won 56–22
April 27	D.C. Divas	Away	Won 56–35
May 4	New York Sharks	Away	Won 47–0
May 11	Pittsburgh Passion	Away	Won 42–28
May 18	D.C. Divas	Home	Won 81–54
June 1	Central Maryland Seahawks	Home	Won 56–0
June 8	Montreal Blitz	Away	Won 50–0
June 22	Pittsburgh Passion (National Conference Quarterfinal)	Home	Won 63–28
July 13	D.C. Divas (National Conference Semifinal)	Home	Won 58–34
July 20	Chicago Force (National Conference Final)	Away	Lost 27–46

=== Standings ===
WFA 2013 Division 1
	W	L	T	PCT	PF	PA	DIV	GB	STK
y - Boston Militia	8	0	0	1.000	412	50	4-0	---	W8
z - New York Sharks	4	4	0	0.500	172	223	2-2	4	L1
Central Maryland Seahawks	2	6	0	0.250	23	247	0-4	6	L1

y - clinched division title
z - clinched division title The Boston Militia finished the season with the league's second highest Massey Rating of 2.21.

== 2014 ==
=== Recap ===
In their seventh season, the Boston Militia posted a 7–0 record in a regular season highlighted by two narrow victories over the D.C. Divas and first-ever regular-season contests against the Chicago Force and the Cleveland Fusion. Boston's regular-season victory over Chicago at a neutral location (Munhall, Pennsylvania, hosted by the Pittsburgh Force) ultimately gave the Militia home field advantage in the playoffs. After defeating the Cleveland Fusion 47–6 in the National Conference quarterfinals at Dilboy Stadium, Boston outpaced the D.C. Divas at home in the highest scoring postseason game in women's tackle football history 72–56. The Militia next hosted the WFA National Conference Championship where they handed the Chicago Force their biggest losing margin in their 11-year history 69–14. On August 2, 2014, in Chicago, Illinois, the Boston Militia trounced the San Diego Surge 69–34 to win their second WFA National Championship. Halfback Whitney Zelee was named the game's Most Valuable Player. With the victory, the Boston Militia are the only team to date who have won multiple WFA championships. It is the franchise's third national championship title overall (2010, 2011, 2014).

Head Coach Derrick Beasley received the WFA Coach of the Year Award, quarterback Allison Cahill received the WFA National Conference Most Valuable Player Award and linebacker Noriko Kokura received the WFA National Conference Defensive Player of the Year Award.

=== Schedule ===
Date	Opponent	Home/Away	Result
April 5	D.C. Divas	Home	Won 36–32
April 19	Cleveland Fusion	Home	Won 47–7
April 26	Central Maryland Seahawks	Away	Won by forfeit
May 3	Cleveland Fusion	Away	Won 47–7
May 10	Baltimore Burn	Away	Won by forfeit
May 17	Chicago Force	Neutral (Munhall, PA)	Won 35–18
June 7	D.C. Divas	Away	Won 29–28
June 21	Cleveland Fusion (National Conference Quarterfinal)	Home	Won 47–6
July 5	D.C. Divas (National Conference Semifinal)	Home	Won 72–56
July 13	Chicago Force (National Conference Final)	Home	Won 63–14
August 2	San Diego Surge (WFA National Championship)	Neutral (Chicago, IL)	Won 69–34

=== Standings ===
2014 WFA Northeast Division
	W	L	T	PCT	PF	PA	DIV	GB	STK
y - Boston Militia	7	0	0	1.000	199	92	2-0	---	W7
z - Cleveland Fusion	6	2	0	0.750	224	121	0-2	2	W4
Pittsburgh Force	3	2	0	0.600	64	80	0-0	5	L1

y - clinched division title
z - clinched playoff berth The Boston Militia finished the season with the league's highest Massey Rating of 2.56.

== Roster ==
Boston Militia Championship Roster (2014)
Quarterbacks: 7 Allison Cahill; Running backs: 8 Asia Landrum; 14 Stacey Tiamfook; 33 Whitney Zelee; 39 Dorothy Donaldson; Wide receivers: 2 Lucia Robinson-Griggs; 10 Adrienne Smith; 15 Kathryn Tylander; 28 Abby Pelletier (TE); 85 Emily Weinberg (TE); Offensive line: 50 Amanda Alpert; 54 Torrance Brown; 64 Shana Segers; 65 Kehinda Oshodi; 66 Stephanie Jeffers; 76 Sherese Woodfine; 99 Beth Kaleta	Defensive line: 42 Riss Nardelli; 62 Michelle Vachon-Breden; 68 Mamenasha Tesfaye; 71 Nakita Bowman; 75 Coco Edwards; 77 Tinisha Ponzo; 78 Gladys Ponzo; 80 Tomi Gibson; Linebackers: 18 Noriko Kokura; 25 Jennifer Oliveri; 30 Erin Diette; 36 Charlene Casey; 54 Jennifer Nguyễn; 45 Vicky Eddy; 52 Deirdre Hiort; 55 Tiana Lui; 67 Kristen Sarson; 82 Lisa Vincent-Horta	Defensive backs: 3 Katie McFadden; 13 Mocha Torres; 19 Elizabeth Calkins; 22 Emily Holland; 24 Briannah Gallo; 26 Heather Crocker; 53 Shauntay Stewart; 83 Deanna Walsh; 89 Joy Burge; Special teams: 8 Asia Landrum (KR/PR); 10 Adrienne Smith (PR/KR); 14 Stacey Tiamfook (PR); 18 Noriko Kokura (LS); 22 Emily Holland (PK); 45 Vicky Eddy (H); 50 Amanda Alpert (LS); 85 Emily Weinberg (K/P); rookies in italics; 44 Active, 3 Inactive, 0 Practice Squad; Roster updated November 16, 2014; Source:
