= Manchester Freedom =

Football team in the Independent Women's Football League

- Founded: 2001
- League: Independent Women's Football League
- Team history: New Hampshire Freedom (2001-2004); Manchester Freedom (2005-2011)
- Based in: Manchester, New Hampshire
- Stadium: West Memorial Field
- Colors: green, gold, black
- Owner: Ray Simoneau
- Head coach: Jim Gallatto
- Championships: 0

The Manchester Freedom was an American football team in the Independent Women's Football League based in Manchester, New Hampshire. Home games were played at West Memorial Field on the campus of Manchester High School West.

Russian women's national hockey team member Yekaterina Pashkevich played several seasons for the club.

Julie Carignan and Jen Pirog were attached to the team in 2010, when they played for the U.S. team that won the nation's first International Federation of American Football Women’s World Championship. Despite the presence of national team players on its roster, the team only won one game in the 2010 season.

The team improved to 4-4 in 2011. The Freedom disbanded after the 2011 season.

Freedom running back and linebacker Kimberly Boroyan was named to the league's All-Star team in 2007, 2009, and 2011.

== Season-by-season ==
Season records
Season	W	L	T	Finish	Playoff results
New Hampshire Freedom (IWFL)
2001	Results Unknown				
2002	2	6	0	6th East Division	--
2003	3	5	0	3rd East North Atlantic	--
2004	4	3	1	3rd East Mid-Atlantic	--
Manchester Freedom (IWFL)
2005	3	7	0	4th East Mid-Atlantic	--
2006	3	4	0	2nd East North Atlantic	--
2007	6	2	0	1st East Northeast	Lost Eastern Conference Qualifier (New York)
2008	4	4	0	3rd Tier II North Atlantic	--
2009	4	5	0	8th Tier II	Lost Tier II Quarterfinal (Montreal)
2010	0	3	0	5th Tier II East Northeast	
2011	4	4	0	3rd East North Atlantic	
New Hampshire Freedom (IWFL)
2012	3	5	0	3rd East North Atlantic	
Totals	36	50	1	(including playoffs)	

== Season schedules ==
=== 2009 ===
Date	Opponent	Home/Away	Result
April 11	Connecticut Crushers	Away	Won 27-15
April 18	Boston Militia	Away	Lost 42-0
April 25	Central PA Vipers	Home	Won 47-0
May 2	New England Intensity	Away	Lost 13-0
May 9	New England Intensity	Home	Lost 20-8
May 16	Southern Maine Rebels	Away	Won 13-8
May 30	Erie Illusion	Home	Lost 20-13
June 13	Southern Maine Rebels	Away	Won 19-6
June 27	Montreal Blitz (Tier II Quarterfinal)	Away	Lost 68-0

=== 2010 ===
Date	Opponent	Home/Away	Result
April 3	Jersey Justice	Away	Lost 32-0
April 10	New England Intensity	Away	Lost 25-6
April 17	Montreal Blitz	Away	Lost 41-14
May 1	Holyoke Hurricanes	Home	Won 2-0
May 8	New England Intensity	Home	Lost 20-0
May 15	Southern Maine Rebels	Home	Won 21-0
May 22	Connecticut Crushers	Away	Lost 46-0
June 5	New York Nemesis	Home	Lost 38-0

=== 2011 ===
Date	Opponent	Home/Away	Result
April 9	Montreal Blitz	Away	Lost 12-6
April 16	Jersey Justice	Home	Won 8-0
April 30	New England Intensity	Away	Lost 27-7
May 7	Montreal Blitz	Home	Lost 25-13
May 14	Southern Maine Rebels	Home	Won 40-8
May 21	New England Intensity	Home	Lost 7-0
June 4	Southern Maine Rebels	Away	Won 37-0
June 11	Philadelphia Firebirds	Home	Won 26-0
