= Holyoke Hurricanes =

Defunct team of Independent Women's Football League

- Founded: 2008
- League: Independent Women's Football League
- Team history: Holyoke Hurricanes (2008-2009)
- Based in: Ware, Massachusetts
- Stadium: Ware Junior Senior High School
- Colors: Green, orange, white
- President: Debra Midgley
- Head coach: n/a
- Championships: 0

The Holyoke Hurricanes are a now defunct team of the Independent Women's Football League. Based out of Holyoke, Massachusetts, the Hurricanes played their home games at Ware High School in nearby Ware.

The Hurricanes forfeited the final two games of the 2009 season, and all of the 2010 season.

== Season-by-season ==
Season records
Season	W	L	T	Finish	Playoff results
2008	2	6	0	4th Tier II North Atlantic	
2009	0	8	0	24th Tier II	--
Totals	2	14	0		

== Season schedules ==
=== 2009 ===
Date	Opponent	Home/Away	Result
April 11	New England Intensity	Away	Lost 0-34
April 25	Southern Maine Rebels	Home	Lost 0-14
May 2	Montreal Blitz	Home	Lost 0-48
May 16	New England Intensity	Home	Lost 0-53
May 17	Montreal Blitz	Away	Lost 0-2
June 6	Central PA Vipers	Away	Lost 0-48
June 13	Montreal Blitz	Home	Lost 0-2**
June 20	Erie Illusion	Away	Lost 0-2**

** = Forfeited

=== 2010 ===
Date	Opponent	Home/Away	Result
April 3	New England Intensity	Away	
April 17	Southern Maine Rebels	Home	
April 24	Montreal Blitz	Away	
May 1	Manchester Freedom	Away	
May 8	Southern Maine Rebels	Away	
May 15	New England Intensity	Home	
May 22	Jersey Justice	Away	
May 29	Binghamton Tiger Cats	Home	
