= Richmond Black Widows =

American football team

- Founded: 2015
- League: WFA (2016-present)
- Team history: 2015-Present
- Based in: Richmond, Virginia
- Stadium: Hermitage H.S.
- Colors: Black, Red, White
- Owner: Liane Schkeeper
- Head coach: Steve Baxter
- Championships: 2025
- Mascot: Betty
- Founder: Sarah Schkeeper

The Richmond Black Widows are a women's American football team playing out of Richmond, Virginia. They are a member of the Women's Football Alliance (WFA). They are the first women's football team in Richmond, and currently the only team in Virginia. They played their inaugural season in April 2016.

For the 2022 season, Richmond Black Widows' games are held at Hermitage High School.

== Staff ==
As of 2025 the coaching staff include:

- Head coach - Steve Baxter
- Offensive Coordinator - Willie Burns
- Defensive Coordinator - Tyrone King
- Assistant coach - Tamika Howard
- QB/DB/Assistant Coach - Tamaris Reynolds
- DB/WR Coach - Kris Holland

== History ==
=== Women's Football in Richmond ===
The Richmond Black Widows was founded in 2015 by Sarah Schkeeper with the express goal of, not only promoting women's football in the area, but providing young girls and women the opportunity to play a sport they have been denied and growing the confidence of young girls by showing them what can be achieved with drive and determination. At least once, prior to Sarah Schkeeper founding the Richmond Black Widows, a women's football team was attempted in Richmond. It fizzled before it ever started a season. Having played for 5 years for the New York Sharks and competing in 2013 on the US Women's National Team that participated in the IFAF Women's World Championship, Schkeeper moved to Richmond, Virginia and started the journey of bringing women's football to Richmond, Virginia.

As there was no foundation for football in the area, Sarah Schkeeper had to use alternative means to spread the word, creating a MeetUp group. Currently the team has a strong roster of over 40 women and a knowledgeable coaching staff.

== Season-by-season ==
Season records
Season	W	L	T	Finish	Playoff results
Richmond Black Widows (WFA)
2016	5	3	0	T–2nd Colonial Division	Tier III National Conference Champions
2017	4	3	0	3rd DIII Northeast Region	
2018	5	2	0	3rd DIII Northeast Region	DIII Semifinals
2019	4	3	0	4th DIII Northeast Region	
2021	1	5	0	4th DIII Northeast Region	
2022	3	3	0	--	
2023	2	4	0	11th DIII National Conference	
2024	2	4	0	6th DIII Southeast Region	
2025	6	0	0	1st DIII National Conference	
Totals	35	29	0	(including playoffs)	

* = current standing

== Roster ==
Richmond Black Widows Roster
Quarterbacks: 7 Mary Allison; Running backs: 3 Marisha Berry; 5 Shawnisa Estep; 16 Jazmine Beard; 17 Chanera Thomas; 31 JaMesha Worthington (FB); Receivers: 1 Takayla Tk Graham; 10 Tay Willis; 12 Tiara Stovall; 14 Tracy Wright; 23 Tatiana Johnson; 24 Keona Moore	Offensive line: 6 Charvae Woodson; 20 Manuela Curtis; 29 Myake Bogle; 58 Donna Pegram; 62 Aleshia Jackson; 77 Shaquilla Holland; Defensive line: 27 Cynthia Williams; 45 Alexis Lawrence; 50 Destiny Crenshaw; 76 Angela Denice Hoskins; 98 Cherika Barcliff; Linebackers: 2 Jenna DeSantis; 4 DZhiya DJ Thompson; 13 Chiquita Nathaniel; 21 Melanie Rouse; 32 Markashia Washington; 35 Sha Maclin; 88 Alix Barnette; 95 LaDonna Roane; 99 LaToya Parrish	Defensive backs: 22 Jada Holland; Special teams Multiple/Unknown positions: Currently vacant	Injured reserve

== Season schedules ==
=== 2016 ===
Date	Opponent	Home/Away	Result
April 2	Tri Cities Thunder	Away	Won 48-12
April 9	Fayetteville Fierce	Away	Won 28-0
April 16	Philadelphia Phantomz	Home	Lost 6-42
April 23	DC Divas	Home	Lost 6-48
April 30	Fayatteville Fierce	Home	Won 32-8
May 7	Philadelphia Phantomz	Away	Lost 0-48
May 14	BYE		
May 21	Keystone Assault	Away	Won 12-0
May 28	BYE		
June 4	Tri Cities Thunder	Home	Forfeit 2-0
June 25 Playoff	Keystone Assault	Home	Win 14-8
July 22 Championship	Acadiana Zydeco	Home	Lost 18-20

=== 2017 ===
Date	Opponent	Home/Away	Result
April 1	New York Sharks	Home	Lost 0–18
April 8	Connecticut Hawks	Away	Won 32–12
April 15	Hampton Roads Lady Gators	Home	Won 14–6
April 22	Carolina Phoenix	Away	Lost 0–40
April 29	Keystone Assault	Home	Won 40–0
May 6	BYE		
May 13	BYE		
May 20	Baltimore Nighthawks	Away	Lost 30–62
May 28	BYE		
June 3	Hampton Roads Lady Gators	Away	Won 28–14

=== 2018 ===
Date	Opponent	Home/Away	Result
April 7	Maine Mayhem	Away	Won 24–0
April 14	South Carolina Smash	Away	Won 28–0
April 21	BYE		
April 28	Keystone Assault	Away	Won 50–0
May 5	BYE		
May 12	DC Divas	Home	Lost 12–61
May 19	BYE		
May 26	South Carolina Smash	Home	Won 62–40
June 2	Philly Phantomz	Away	Lost 6–30
June 9	Connecticut Hawks	Away	Won 33–6
June 16 Playoff	Columbus Vanguards	Home	Won 34–0
June 30 Playoff	Toledo Reign	Away	Won 12–6
July 14 Playoff	Orlando Anarchy	Away	Lost 14–27

=== 2019 ===
Date	Opponent	Home/Away	Result
April 6	Baltimore Nighthawks	Away	Lost 22–61
April 13	BYE		
April 20	Philly Phantomz	Away	Lost 0–33
April 27	New York Knockout	Home	Won 18–14
May 4	South Carolina Smash	Home	Won 52–34
May 11	BYE		
May 18	Connecticut Hawks	Away	Won 22–18
May 25	BYE		
June 1	DC Divas	Home	Lost 8–70
June 8	Rock Hill Lady Raiders	Away	Forfeit 2–0

=== 2021 ===
Date	Opponent	Home/Away	Result
May 1	Baltimore Nighthawks	Away	Lost 0–45
May 8	Carolina Phoenix	Away	Lost 6–13
May 15	BYE		
May 22	New York Knockout	Away	Lost 14–34
May 29	Carolina Phoenix	Home	Won 8–0
June 5	Baltimore Nighthawks	Home	Lost 16–25
June 12	New York Knockout	Home	Lost 14–20

=== 2022 ===
Date	Opponent	Home/Away	Result
April 9	Carolina Phoenix	Away	Lost 33–59
April 16	Virginia Lady Firehawks	Away	Lost 7–42
April 23	East Tennessee Valkyrie	Home	Lost 18–42
April 30	South Carolina Dames	Home	Won 19–0
May 7	BYE		
May 14	Harrisburg Havoc	Home	Won 39–16
May 21	South Carolina Dames	Away	Forfeit 2–0

=== 2023 ===
Date	Opponent	Home/Away	Result
April 22	Virginia Panthers	Away	Lost 0–50
April 29	Carolina Phoenix	Away	Lost 12–34
May 6	BYE		
May 13	South Carolina Dames	Home	Won 18–0
May 20	Harrisburg Havoc	Home	Lost 19–20
June 3	Virginia Panthers	Home	Lost 0–52
June 10	North Conn Nightmare	Away	Won 24–16

=== 2024 ===
Date	Opponent	Home/Away	Result
April 27	East Tennessee Valkyrie	Home	Lost 14–24
May 4	Raleigh Express	Away	Lost 0–21
May 11	BYE		
May 18	Virginia Panthers	Away	Lost 0–6
May 25	BYE		
June 1	East Tennessee Valkyrie	Away	Lost 8–38
June 8	Carolina Phoenix	Home	Won 53–0
June 15	Music City Mizfits	Home	Won 26–6

=== 2025 ===
Date	Opponent	Home/Away	Result
April 26	Harrisburg Havoc	Away	Won 49–0
May 3	BYE		
May 10	Music City Mizfits	Home	Won 27–6
May 17	Carolina Phoenix	Home	Won 40–0
May 24	BYE		
May 31	Virginia Panthers	Away	Won 21–0
June 7	Raleigh Express	Home	Forfeit 2–0
June 14	Music City Mizfits	Away	Won 13–6
June 28 Playoff	Upstate Lady Predators	Home	Won 27–0
July 12 Playoff	Connecticut Ambush	Home	Won 45-14
July 25 Championship	Oklahoma Rage	Home	Won 25-7
