= Jersey Justice =

- Founded: 2008
- League: none
- Team history: Jersey Justice (IWFL) (2009-2010); Jersey Justice (Independent) (2011)
- Based in: Holmdel Township, New Jersey
- Stadium: St. John Vianney High School
- Colors: Black, pink
- President: Bill Lockward
- Head coach: Gene Basile/Bill Lockward
- Championships: 0

The Jersey Justice were an Independent Women's Tackle Football Team based in Carteret, New Jersey. The team was formed in 2008 with many former players and staff from the New Jersey Titans. Home games in 2011 are to be played on the campus of St. John Vianney High School in Holmdel Township, New Jersey. Prior to 2011 they played all home games at Carteret High School. The Justice elected to not finish the 2011 season after playing only 3 games and are defunct.

== History ==
The Justice were established in late 2008 and originally planning to be a member of the National Women's Football Association. Once the NWFA folded, however, the Justice began play in the spring 2009 season as a member of the Independent Women's Football League. In the team's inaugural season, they earned a spot in the league's Divisional Playoff Game, defeating the New England Intensity by a score of 30-7 and advanced to the league's Regional Championship Game (Tier II Semifinal), losing to the Montreal Blitz by a score of 9–8.

2010 proved to be an even better season record-wise, as the Justice finished 6–1. However, because of the IWFL's playoff method, the Justice were left out of the postseason (only two teams per division got to go, and the Justice finished third behind the Montreal Blitz and New England Intensity-coincidentally the same two teams they faced in the previous year's postseason).

For the 2011 season, the Justice played as an Independent team.

== Season-by-season ==
Season records
Season	W	L	T	Finish	Playoff results
Jersey Justice (IWFL)
2009	5	3	0	7th Tier II	Won Tier II Quarterfinal (New England); Lost Tier II Semifinal (Montreal)
2010	6	1	0	3rd Tier II East Northeast	
Jersey Justice (INDEPENDENT)
2011	1	6	0	--	--
Totals	13	11	0	(including playoffs)	

== Season schedules ==
=== 2009 ===
Date	Opponent	Home/Away	Result
April 11	Erie Illusion	Away	Won 8-6
April 18	New York Nemesis	Away	Lost 0-40
April 25	Carolina Queens	Home	Lost 20-28
May 2	Southern Maine Rebels	Away	Won 40-14
May 9	Central PA Vipers	Home	Won 34-0
May 16	Baltimore Nighthawks	Away	Lost 6-32
May 30	Southern Maine Rebels	Home	Won 28-8
June 13	Erie Illusion	Home	Won 36-16
June 27	New England Intensity (Tier II Quarterfinal)	Away	Won 30-7
July 11	Montreal Blitz (Tier II Semifinal)	Away	Lost 8-9

=== 2010 ===
Date	Opponent	Home/Away	Result
April 3	Manchester Freedom	Home	Won 32-0
April 10	Southern Maine Rebels	Away	Won 26-8
April 24	Binghamton Tiger Cats	Home	Won 40-0
May 1	New York Sharks	Home	Lost 8-50
May 8	Binghamton Tiger Cats	Away	Won 38-0
May 15	Connecticut Crushers	Away	Won 22-6
May 22	Binghamton Tiger Cats	Home	Won 38-8

=== 2011 ===
Date	Opponent	Home/Away	Result
April 9	Bye		
April 16	Manchester Freedom	Away	Lost 0-8
April 23	Binghamton Tiger Cats	Home	Won 36-8
April 30	Baltimore Burn	Home	Lost 8-12
May 7	Three Rivers Xplosion	Home	Lost 0-6 (Forfeit)
May 14	BYE		
May 21	Binghamton Tiger Cats	Away	Lost 0-6 (Forfeit)
June 4	Baltimore Burn	Away	Lost 0-6 (Forfeit)
June 11	Three Rivers Xplosion	Away	Lost 0-6 (Forfeit)
