= New York Nemesis =

- Founded: 2007
- League: Independent Women's Football League
- Team history: WPFL (planning stages); NWFA (2008); IWFL (2009-2011)
- Based in: Schenectady, New York
- Stadium: Schenectady High School
- Colors: Black, gold, white
- Owner: Carley Pesente
- Head coach: Craig Jacoby
- Championships: 0

The New York Nemesis were a women's tackle football team playing out of the Capital District of New York. It was a member of the Independent Women's Football League (IWFL), a league with over 30 teams across the United States. The Nemesis played in the Northern Conference, with home games on the campus of Schenectady High School in Schenectady.

The team was owned by ten year women's football veteran Carley Pesente, who is also a ranked professional boxer. She put together a strong management team led by GM Diane Wilkinson, and Alana Graziano Assistant GM and Team Delegate, both veterans to the game of football.

After the 2010, IWFL season and since then, nothing has ever been heard of the Nemesis.

Logo as an NWFA team

== Season-by-season ==
Season records
Season	W	L	T	Finish	Playoff results
New York Nemesis (NWFA)
2008	8	0	0	1st NC Northeast	First-round bye Lost NC Semifinals (West Michigan)
New York Nemesis (IWFL)
2009	5	3	0	2nd Tier I EC North Atlantic	--
2010	3	5	0	4th Tier I EC Northeast	--
Totals	16	9	0	(including playoffs)	

== Season Schedules ==
=== 2009 ===
Date	Opponent	Home/Away	Result
April 11	New York Sharks	Home	Lost 7-21
April 18	Jersey Justice	Home	Won 40-0
April 25	Montreal Blitz	Away	Won 14-6
May 9	Philadelphia Firebirds	Home	Won 34-3
May 16	Pittsburgh Passion	Away	Lost 0-41
May 30	Montreal Blitz	Home	Won 13-6
June 6	Boston Militia	Away	Lost 12-49
June 13	Connecticut Crushers	Away	Won 28-6

=== 2010 ===
Date	Opponent	Home/Away	Result
April 3	Boston Militia	Home	Lost 6-56
April 17	Connecticut Crushers	Home	Won 25-0
April 24	Baltimore Nighthawks	Away	Lost 6-7
May 1	Philadelphia Firebirds	Home	Won 33-0
May 8	Boston Militia	Home	Lost 0-40
May 15	Montreal Blitz	Away	Lost 0-20
May 22	D.C. Divas	Away	Lost 21-49
June 5	Manchester Freedom	Away	Won 38-0
