= Connecticut Crushers =

Women's American football team

- Founded: 2001
- League: Independent Women's Football League
- Team history: Connecticut Crush (NWFA) (2001-2008); Connecticut Crushers (IWFL) (2009-2018)
- Based in: Hartford, Connecticut
- Stadium: Dillon Stadium
- Colors: Blue, orange, white
- President: Melanie DePamphilis and Luz Oliver
- Head coach: Duane Brooks
- Championships: 0

The Connecticut Crushers were a women's American football team based in Hartford, and were a member of the Independent Women's Football League since 2009. Home games were played at Dillon Stadium.

Prior to 2009, the team was known as the Connecticut Crush and played in the National Women's Football Association. The name change was done so as not to conflict with fellow IWFL team the Iowa Crush.

== Season-by-season ==
Season records
Season	W	L	T	Finish	Playoff results
Connecticut Crush (NWFA)
2001	2	6	0	4th Northern	--
2002	5	5	0	3rd North	--
2003	7	3	0	2nd Northern North	Lost Northern Conference Quarterfinal (D.C.)
2004	5	3	0	3rd Northern North	--
2005	6	3	0	6th Northern	Lost Northern Conference Quarterfinal (Massachusetts)
2006	4	4	0	3rd Northern Northeast	--
2007	6	3	0	2nd Northern North	Lost Northern Conference Quarterfinal (Cleveland)
2008	3	5	0	2nd Northern Northeast	--
Connecticut Crushers (IWFL)
2009	1	7	0	5th Eastern North Atlantic	--
Connecticut Crushers (IWFL2)
2010	1	7	0	6th Eastern Northeast	--
Totals	40	46	0	(including playoffs)	

== Season schedules ==
=== 2009 ===
Date	Opponent	Home/Away	Result
April 11	Manchester Freedom	Home	Lost 15-27
April 25	Philadelphia Firebirds	Away	Lost 12-31
May 2	Boston Militia	Away	Lost 0-47
May 9	New York Sharks	Away	Lost 7-40
May 30	Pittsburgh Passion	Away	Lost 0-76
June 6	Baltimore Nighthawks	Home	Lost 8-30
June 13	New York Nemesis	Home	Lost 6-28
June 20	Central PA Vipers	Home	Won 2-0

** = Won by forfeit

=== 2010 ===
Date	Opponent	Home/Away	Result
April 10	Boston Militia	Away	Lost 10-59
April 17	New York Nemesis	Away	Lost 0-25
April 24	New York Sharks	Away	Lost 14-65
May 1	New England Intensity	Away	Lost 18-19
May 8	Montreal Blitz	Home	Lost 0-22
May 15	Jersey Justice	Home	Lost 6-22
May 22	Manchester Freedom	Home	Won 46-0
June 5	Montreal Blitz	Home	Lost 0-26
