= Central Canadian Women's Football League =

Gridiron football league, founded 2014

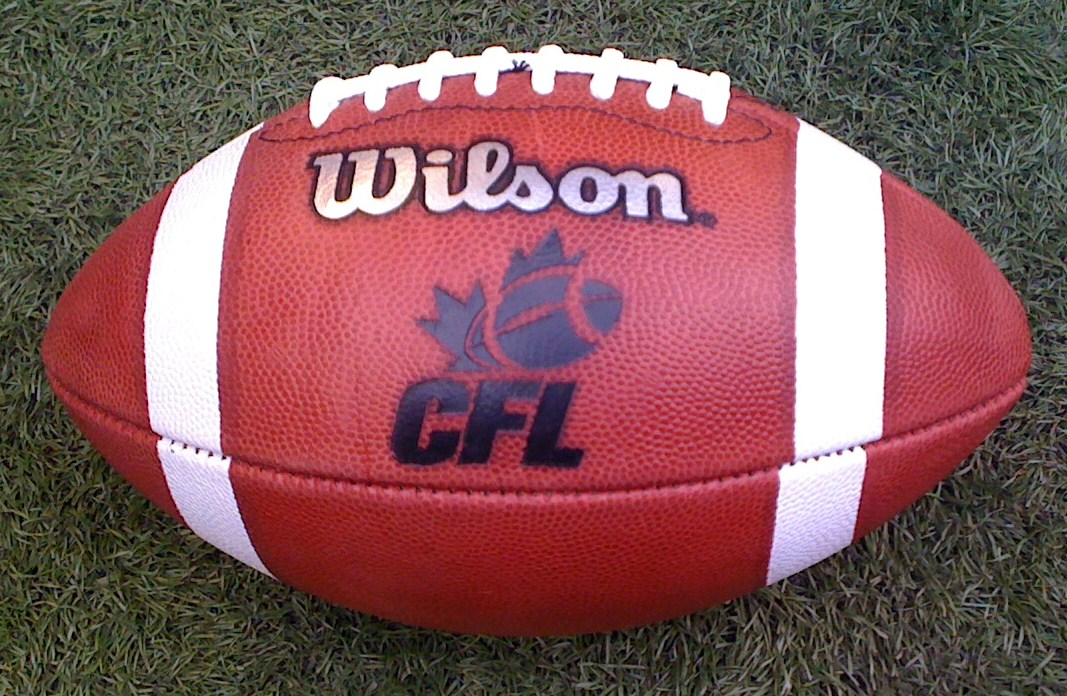
A Canadian football

The Central Canadian Women's Football League (CCWFL; French: Ligue centrale canadienne de football féminin, LCCFF) is a full-contact Canadian football league supported by Football Quebec and Football Ontario.

Originally founded in 2014, the league played its first season in 2022. It thus became the third cross-province league for women's football in Canada, alongside the Western Women's Canadian Football League and the Maritime Women's Football League.

== History ==
The Central Canadian league was first formed in 2014, intending to play a 2015 season. Football Canada made the announcement in April 2014 of an over-18s' women's tackle football league. Its official launch in July was attended by the premier of Ontario, Kathleen Wynne, and members of the Toronto Argonauts gave continuing support to the players. Aaron Ellis had founded the project so that his daughter Tianna could continue to play football after high school. Teams would have been based in Mississauga, Hamilton, Scarborough and York Region. However, the planned league did not materialize in 2015 due to lack of registered players.

The Montreal Blitz had been established in 2001 and won the American Independent Women's Football League championship in 2012. The Ottawa Capital Rebels were founded in early 2020.

The Blitz and Rebels were co-founders of the CCWFL when it announced its re-formation in 2021. The Ottawa team's co-founder Sonia Rodi, a football coach and former rugby player, said, "When I go to these [coaching] clinics, I’m always the only female", and made an effort to find female coaches. She wanted the team to inspire girls who play football and are excluded: "It’s easier for men because it’s a sport for them. But for women, we just have to work harder for everything."

The league's first game was the Montreal Blitz versus the Quebec City Phoenix on May 14, 2022, at Stade Hébert, a 25–0 win for the Blitz, who were undefeated by the end of the season on June 25. The Montreal team is coached by former quarterback Saadia Ashraf. The Phoenix de Québec, from Quebec City, were newly founded in 2022. Ottawa played its 2022 home games at Matt Anthony Field, University of Ottawa. Because some team rosters were undersized, the 2022 games were played as 9-versus-9 players.

The CCWFL commissioner is Andréanne Dupont-Parent, the Montreal Blitz's general manager and a former player for Canada in the 2010 World Championship. Male CFL players who have been involved in training the CCWFL's players include Eddie Brown, Antoine Pruneau, and Samuel Thomassin. Ten CCWFL players were selected for the primary Canada team roster at the American football 2022 World Championship.

The 2023 league had only two clubs, the Montreal Blitz and York Region Football Association (playing its home games at St. Maximillian Kolbe High School in Aurora, Ontario). They played four regular-season games, all won by the Blitz. In December 2023, the Ottawa Capital Rebels became the women's football section of the Gatineau Valkyries. In 2023 in Quebec, a related football league for girls aged 15–17 was founded, the LFFMQ, playing its first season in 2024.

The CCWFL added a team in Trois-Rivières, the Trois-Rivières Battle Angels, in July 2023, having targeted that city for expansion in 2022. Four games were scheduled in 2024 between the Blitz, Quebec Phoenix and the Battle Angels, but CCWFL Jamboree events were held at the venues instead with all three teams, and no scores were announced. Since 2022, the league has also aimed to expand to include teams in Toronto and elsewhere in Quebec and Ontario.
