= Southern Maine Rebels =

- Founded: 2004
- League: Independent Women's Football League
- Team history: Southern Maine Rebels (2004-2010); Maine Rebels (2011-present)
- Based in: Portland, Maine
- Stadium: Memorial Stadium
- Colors: navy, silver, red
- Owner: Ruth Murphy
- Head coach: Corey Preman
- Championships: 0

The Maine Rebels are a football team in the Independent Women's Football League based in Portland, Maine. Home games are played at Memorial Stadium on the campus of Deering High School. They were formerly known as the Southern Maine Rebels until 2011.

== Season-by-season ==
Season records
Season	W	L	T	Finish	Playoff results
Southern Maine Rebels (IWFL)
2004	2	4	1	X-Team	--
2005	8	2	0	2nd East Mid-Atlantic	Lost Eastern Conference Semifinal (New York)
2006	1	7	0	3rd East Mid-Atlantic	--
2007	0	8	0	3rd East Northeast	--
2008	1	7	0	5th Tier II North Atlantic	--
2009	2	6	0	15th Tier II	--
2010*	1	7	0	7th Tier II East Northeast	--
2011	0	8	0	4th Tier 1 Northeast	
2012	0	0	0	4th Tier 1 Northeast	
2013	0	8	0	4th Tier 3 Northeast	
Totals	15	57	1	(including playoffs)	

* = Current standing

== Season schedules ==
=== 2009 ===
Date	Opponent	Home/Away	Result
April 18	Montreal Blitz	Home	Lost 6-55
April 25	Holyoke Hurricanes	Away	Won 14–0
May 2	Jersey Justice	Home	Lost 14–40
May 16	Manchester Freedom	Home	Lost 8–13
May 23	Central PA Vipers	Away	Won 14–8
May 30	Jersey Justice	Away	Lost 8-28
June 6	New England Intensity	Home	Lost 0–19
June 13	Manchester Freedom	Away	Lost 6–19

=== 2010 ===
Date	Opponent	Home/Away	Result
April 3	New England Intensity	Away	Lost 0-28
April 10	Jersey Justice	Home	Lost 8-26
April 24	New England Intensity	Home	Lost 0-23
May 1	Montreal Blitz	Home	Lost 6-41
May 15	Manchester Freedom	Away	Lost 6-21
May 22	Montreal Blitz	Away	Lost 0-34
May 29	New England Intensity	Home	Lost 7-56
June 5	Binghamton Tiger Cats	Away	Won 21–8

== Logo ==
The logo of the Rebels is reminiscent of the emblem used by the Rebel Alliance and the New Republic from Star Wars.
