= Erie Illusion =

Women's Football Team Of United States

- Founded: 2003
- League: United States Women's Football League
- Team history: NWFA (2003-2008); IWFL (2009-2010); WFA (2011); IWFL (2012-2014); United States Women's Football League(2015-2016)
- Based in: Erie, Pennsylvania
- Stadium: Erie Veterans Memorial Stadium
- Colors: Purple, orange, white
- Owner: Mary Butler
- Head coach: Troy Allen
- Championships: 0

The Erie Illusion was a women's football team playing in the United States Women's Football League and they were based in Erie, Pennsylvania. Their team colors was orange and purple; the team played at Erie Veterans Memorial Stadium. Mary Butler was the owner and general manager of the franchise. Troy Allen was the Illusion's final head coach.

== History ==
They began playing in 2003 as a member of the National Women's Football Association, finishing the season with a 0-8 record. After bringing in a new coaching staff with significant collegiate playing experience, the team improved in 2004 and finished with a 1-7 overall record.

The 2005 season, under head coach Robert Beres, had been (prior to 2007) the Illusion's best season to date. The team finished with a respectable 3-5 record. In addition, all five losses in 2005 were to teams that qualified for the NWFA playoffs.

In 2006 the Illusion struggled to a 1-8 finish as they faced home and away contests against league powerhouses Pittsburgh Passion, Cleveland Fusion and the Columbus Comets.

In 2007, the Illusion schedule featured eight teams with comparable populations and market size to Erie. The Illusion rolled to a 7-1 record, including a 7-game winning streak to end the season and a defense that only allowed more than 8 points once the whole season (a 14-13 win over the Maine Freeze). The Illusion qualified for the playoffs but faced the eventual league champion Pittsburgh Passion in the opening round.

In 2008, the Illusion finished with a 4-4 season. The team easily defeated each team it played that shared a similar market and roster size but lost four games to teams with more sizable rosters and greater populations (populations of 1 to 2.5 million - compared to Erie's 150,000).

In 2009, the Illusion was granted membership to the Independent Women's Football League, arguably the most successful women's full-tackle league in the country. Based on team and market size, the Illusion was designated a Tier II team, competing against similar teams. To mark the transition, the Illusion adopted a new, modern logo.

In 14 seasons, the Illusion played at two stadiums - Erie Veteran's Memorial Stadium (2003 & 2004; 2011-2016) and Mercyhurst College (2005-2009). In 2009, the team played all but one of their games at Mercyhurst College. The Illusion's final home game in 2009 was played at Erie Veterans Memorial Stadium. Mercyhurst's Tullio Field was not available due to a scheduled replacement of the stadium turf.

Despite many obstacles, the Illusion has survived and thrived in Erie. In fact, the Illusion is Erie's second-longest surviving professional indoor, or outdoor semi- or professional football franchise, men or women's, in nearly 50 years (the only team with a longer existence was Erie Veterans, an independent men's outdoor team that played for over 30 years from the 1920s to the 1950s).

The Illusion concluded its 2009 season with a 3-5 record, despite playing against five teams that earned Tier II playoff spots, including the 2008 Tier II Champion - Montreal Blitz. The team's 2009 schedule also included a game against the former NWFA champion and powerhouse Detroit Demolition.

Following the 2009 regular season, Illusion coach James Reavis and four Illusion players were selected to participate in the IWFL's All-Star Game in Round Rock, Texas. Veterans Michelle Kephart, Corinne Schaeffer, Martha Swick, Brandy Polinick and Tracy Leet were named to the team. This marks the first time in seven seasons that any Illusion players were selected for league, post-season honors.

After the 2010 season, the Illusion announced they were joining the Women's Football Alliance.

The Illusion closed after the 2015-2016 season.

== Season-By-Season ==
Season records
Season	W	L	T	Finish	Playoff results
Erie Illusion (NWFA)
2003	0	8	0	5th Northern Mid-Atlantic	--
2004	1	7	0	4th Northern Mid-Atlantic	--
2005	3	5	0	14th Northern	--
2006	1	7	0	4th Northern North Central	--
2007	7	2	0	2nd Northern Central	Lost Northern Conference Quarterfinals (Pittsburgh)
2008	4	4	0	3rd Northern Central	--
Erie Illusion (IWFL2)
2009	3	5	0	12th League	--
2010	3	5	0	4th Eastern Northeast	--
Erie Illusion (WFA)
2011	3	6	0	4th National Mid-Atlantic	--
Erie Illusion (IWFL)
2012	4	4	0	3rd Eastern Mid-Atlantic	--
2013	1	4	0	X-Team	--
2014	0	6	0	X-Team	--
Erie Illusion (USWFL)
2016	0	3	0	X-Team	--
Totals	30	66	0	(including playoffs)	

== 2010 roster ==
Erie Illusion roster
Quarterbacks: 9 Corinne Schaeffer; Running backs: 11 Tiffany Joyner; 28 Brandy Polinick; Wide receivers: 15 Rebecca Reed; 20 Allison Glazier; 22 Martha Swick	Offensive line: 47 Lisa Fernandez; 55 Laura Olson; 63 Elizabeth Lenker; 65 Carol Kulesza; 77 Emma Pastrick; 89 Marianne Orlop; 92 Shelly Haefner; 99 B.J. Vaughn; Defensive line: 26 Yasmin Ali; 98 Julie Michalski; Linebackers: 19 Victoria Weibel; 44 Michelle Kephart	Defensive backs: 2 Mary McDade; 16 Stacey Mee; 82 Tara Van Horne; Special teams: currently vacant; Multiple Positions: 6 Shawna Burkett CB/RB; 7 Marife Villagonzola QB/FS; 14 Shelley Klinek QB/DB; 79 Dorothy Krupa OT/DE; 83 Rebecca Johnson FS/DT	Injured reserve Brandy Polinick Exempt List: currently vacant; Practice squad: currently vacant; rookies in italics; Roster updated April 23, 2010; 26 Active, 0 Inactive, 0 PS

== 2009 ==
=== Season schedule ===
Date	Opponent	Home/Away	Result
April 11	Jersey Justice	Home	Lost 6-8
April 18	Carolina Phoenix	Away	Lost 0-6
May 2	Central PA Vipers	Home	Won 61-8
May 23	Montreal Blitz	Away	Lost 10-41
May 30	Manchester Freedom	Away	Won 20-13
June 6	Detroit Demolition	Home	Lost 7-33
June 13	Jersey Justice	Away	Lost 16-36
June 20	Holyoke Hurricanes	Home	Won 2-0**

** = Won by forfeit

== 2010 ==
=== Season schedule ===
Date	Opponent	Home/Away	Result
April 3	Pittsburgh Passion	Home	Lost 0-32
April 10	Binghamton Tiger Cats	Home	Won 57-0
April 17	Binghamton Tiger Cats	Away	Won 55-0
April 24	Wisconsin Warriors	Away	Lost 0-19
May 1	Pittsburgh Passion	Away	Lost 2-40
May 8	Louisville Nightmare	Home	Won 47-8
May 22	New England Intensity	Home	Lost 8-28
June 5	New England Intensity	Away	Lost 20-27

== 2011 ==
=== Season schedule ===
Date	Opponent	Home/Away	Result
April 9	Pittsburgh Passion	Home	Lost 14-56
April 16	Pittsburgh Force	Away	Won 20-8
April 30	Cleveland Fusion	Away	Lost 0-50
May 7	Columbus Comets	Home	Lost 7-36
May 14	Binghamton Tiger Cats	Home	Won 38-0
May 21	Cleveland Fusion	Home	Lost 0-50
June 4	Columbus Comets	Away	Lost 0-6**
June 11	Pittsburgh Force	Home	Won 20-0
June 18	Pittsburgh Passion	Away	Lost 7-47

** = Forfeited

Erie Illusion (2003-2008)

Erie Illusion (2009–2016)
