= Northeastern Nitro =

- Founded: 2010
- League: Women's Spring Football League (2013) Women's Football Alliance (2011) Independent Women's Football League (2012)
- Team history: Northeastern Nitro (2011-2013)
- Based in: Bridgeport, Connecticut
- Stadium: Immaculate High School
- Colors: Purple, Silver, White
- President: Carley Pesente; Amy Manfred
- Head coach: Richard Bachand
- Championships: 0

The Northeastern Nitro is a team that competes in the Women's Spring Football League that began play in the 2011 season. They have recently relocated to CT. Formerly based in Danbury, Connecticut, the Nitro played its home games on the campus of Immaculate High School.

The Nitro initially announced that they were joining the Women's Spring Football League for the 2013 season. However, prior to the season, the Nitro merged with the IWFL's Connecticut Wreckers.

== Season-by-season ==
Season records
Season	W	L	T	Finish	Playoff results
2011	4	4	0	3rd National North	--

* = Current Standing

== 2011 roster ==
Northeastern Nitro roster
Quarterbacks: 1 Kate Stepp; 7 Katie DiDio; Running backs: 6 Kelly Mohr; 25 Erika Profenno (FB); 26 Stephany Sabio; 30 Erin Diette (FB); Receivers: 2 Stacy Krasnoff (WR); 11 Chris Kokopoulos (WR); 21 Christine Huber (WR)/(TE); 80 Alyssa Dombroski (TE); 94 Jennifer Davis (WR)	Offensive line: 10 Jennifer Stango; 56 Gretchen Falk; 65 Kim Rodrigues; 69 Melissa Webster (RT); 70 Kelly Woodard; 71 Laura Kulaw; 74 Jennifer Renko; 77 Carrie Hincks; Defensive line: 14 Lisa Schang; 62 Holly Martin-Peele; 73 Lisa Hartford; Linebackers: 8 Laura Anderson; 10 Jennifer Stango; 12 Val Monaco (OLB); 20 Christina Philibert (OLB); 45 Annie Shupe (OLB); 50 Jodi Dunkelman; 54 Carley Pesente (MLB); 55 Lisa Goulart	Defensive backs: 3 Michaela Breakell; 4 Megan Kavanaugh (CB); 28 Christie Caruso (S); 29 Brianna Ruocco (CB); 31 Lynn Kovack (S); 94 Jennifer Davis (S); Special teams: currently vacant; Multiple Positions: 10 Jennifer Stango (LB/OL); 18 Cori Atale (WR/QB); 21 Christine Huber (WR/TE); 32 Ashleigh Bepko (FB/K); 49 Lauren Manfred (TB/WR); 51 Miriam Skrivanek; 53 Anne Herstell (DL/LB); 58 Michelle Bresnahan (OL/DL); 72 Natasha Amsden (OL/DL); 82 Christina Morgatto (TE/LB); 88 Amy Manfred (DB/LB); 94 Jennifer Davis (WR/S); 96 Maggie Koosa (OL/DL)	Injured reserve: currently vacant; Exempt List: currently vacant; Practice squad: currently vacant; rookies in italics; Roster updated April 11, 2011; 43 Active, 0 Inactive, 0 PS

== 2011 ==
=== Standings ===
2011 WFA North Division
	W	L	T	PCT	PF	PA	DIV	GB	STK
y - Boston Militia	7	1	0	0.875	364	72	5-0	---	W7
z - New York Sharks	5	3	0	0.625	212	177	3-2	2.0	L1
Northeastern Nitro	4	4	0	0.500	46	243	2-3	3.0	L1
New England Nightmare	0	8	0	0.000	28	264	0-5	7.0	L8

y - clinched division title
z - clinched playoff berth

=== Season schedule ===
Date	Opponent	Home/Away	Result
April 2	New England Nightmare	Home	Won 13-0
April 16	Keystone Assault	Away	Won 6-0
April 30	Boston Militia	Away	Lost 0-72
May 7	D.C. Divas	Away	Lost 0-77
May 14	Boston Militia	Home	Lost 0-42
May 21	New England Nightmare	Away	
June 4	Keystone Assault	Home	
June 11	New York Sharks	Home	
