= New England Intensity =

- Founded: 2004
- Folded: 2013
- League: Independent Women's Football League
- Team history: Rhode Island Intensity (IWFL) (2004-2005); New England Intensity (WPFL) (2006); New England Intensity (IWFL) (2007-2013)
- Based in: Medway, Massachusetts
- Stadium: Joseph P. Hanlon Field
- Colors: navy, silver, white
- Owner: Tricia Donovan; Ben Brown
- Head coach: Johnny Johnson
- Championships: 0

The New England Intensity was an American football team in the Independent Women's Football League based in Medway, Massachusetts. Home games were played at Joseph P. Hanlon Field on the campus of Medway High School in Medway.

For its first season, in 2003, the Intensity was known as the Rhode Island Riptide. Games were played at Pierce Field in East Providence, Rhode Island. The following two seasons the team was known as the Rhode Island Intensity. The team moved to Medway, going by the "New England" locale name, the Intensity played in the Women's Professional Football League before going back to the IWFL the following year.

The team appears to have folded after the 2013 season.

== Season-by-season ==
Season records
Season	W	L	T	Finish	Playoff results
Rhode Island Intensity (IWFL)
2004	3	4	0	X-Team	--
2005	1	9	0	5th East Mid-Atlantic	--
New England Intensity (WPFL)
2006	7	1	0	1st American East	Lost American Conference Qualifier (So Cal)
New England Intensity (IWFL)
2007	3	5	0	3rd East North Atlantic	--
2008	5	3	0	2nd Tier II North Atlantic	Lost Tier II Semifinal (Clarksville)
2009	6	2	0	5th Tier II	Lost Tier II Quarterfinal (Jersey)
2010	8	1	0	3rd II East Northeast	--
2011	7	4	0	2nd East North Atlantic	Won Tier II Quarterfinal (Baltimore)
Totals	40	29	0	(including playoffs)	

== Season schedules ==
=== 2009 ===
Date	Opponent	Home/Away	Result
April 11	Holyoke Hurricanes	Home	Won 34-0
April 18	Central PA Vipers	Away	Won 21-14
May 2	Manchester Freedom	Home	Won 13-0
May 9	Manchester Freedom	Away	Won 20-8
May 16	Holyoke Hurricanes	Away	Won 53-0
May 30	New York Sharks	Home	Lost 0-44
June 6	Southern Maine Rebels	Away	Won 19-0
June 13	Boston Militia	Home	Lost 0-60
June 27	Jersey Justice (Tier II Quarterfinal)	Home	Lost 7-30

=== 2010 ===
Date	Opponent	Home/Away	Result
April 3	Southern Maine Rebels	Home	Won 28-0
April 10	Manchester Freedom	Home	Won 25-6
April 24	Southern Maine Rebels	Away	won 23-7
May 1	Connecticut Crushers	Home	won 19-18
May 8	Manchester Freedom	Away	won 20-8
May 22	Erie Illusion	Away	won 28-8
May 29	Southern Maine Rebels	Away	won 56-7
June 5	Erie Illusion	Away	won 27-20
