= New York Sharks =

Former women's american football team

- Founded: 1999
- League: Barnstorming (1999); WPFL (2000); Independent (2001); IWFL (2002–2010. 2014-2016); WFA (2011-13, 2017-2018)
- Team history: Long Island Sharks (1990s); New York Sharks (2000-2018)
- Based in: Brooklyn, New York
- Stadium: Aviator Sports Complex
- Colors: Black, light blue, silver
- Owner: Andra Douglas
- Head coach: Fabian Alesandro
- Championships: 2 National (2002-IWFL, 2018-WFA); 1 International (Pro-Cloud Tournament, Birmingham, UK)
- Conference titles: 6 - Eastern Conference
- Division titles: 10
- Mascot: Sharkie

The New York Sharks were a women's American football team that was based in New York City. Their final season in 2018 was played as a member team of the Women's Football Alliance (WFA). They were the longest running and most winning team in women's football history with the honor of having a signed football in the Pro Football Hall of Fame.

== Staff ==
Management staff

- Owner – Andra Douglas
- CFO, Social Media Mgr, former VP of Operations - Dana Sparling
- General manager – Tia Hopkins
- VP - Crystal Turpin

The final 2018 season coaching staff:

- Head coach – Fabian Alesandro
- Defensive coordinator – Kyle Copeland
- Receivers Coach - Alan Walls
- O-Line Coach - Yatia Hopkins
- Defensive Backs Coach - Toni Salvatore
- Quality Control - Pat Brown
- Quarterbacks Coach - Fabian Baez

== History ==
=== First full-contact game ===
The New Yorks Sharks originally started as a women's flag football team called the Long Island Sharks was founded and owned by Jacqueline Colon. They played in international tournaments and were national champions.

In 1999, the Women's Professional Football League (WPFL) was formed. It consisted of two teams, the Minnesota Vixens and the Lake Michigan Minx. They traveled the country playing each other on what was called the "No Limits" Tour. They had heard about the success of the Long Island Sharks and challenged them to a full contact, tackle football game.

Jacqueline Colon accepted the challenge and with two months to prepare, converted her flag football team to a tackle football team. On Saturday, December 11, 1999, the Minnesota Vixens came to New York to take on the Sharks. The Vixens were favored having played 4 games already, having a 2–2 record.

The Sharks were coached by former New York Jet Bobby Jackson. Before 300 fans on a windy day at Mitchel Field, Long Island Sharks surprised Minnesota, defeating them 12–6. The Sharks recorded two touchdown passes by quarterback Val Halesworth. One score was on a long pass to Natalie Jufer that led to a 71-yard touchdown. The other score was an 18-yard pass to Valerie Monaco.

=== Independent Women's Football League ===
The Sharks played their home games at the Aviator Sports Complex at Floyd Bennett Field in Brooklyn, New York. They played an 8-game regular season schedule.

=== Future ===
From 2014 to 2015, the Sharks played in the Independent Women's Football League. From 2016 to 2018, the Sharks were a member team in the Women's Football Alliance (WFA). In 2018 the team was sold and became the New York Wolves.

== Season-by-season ==
(not including Long Island Sharks flag football seasons)

Season records
Season	W	L	T	Finish	Playoff results
New York Sharks (No Limits Barnstorming)
1999	1	0	0	--	Won Exhibition Game (Minnesota)
New York Sharks (WPFL)
2000	4	2	0	2nd NC East	Lost National Conference Qualifier (New England)
New York Sharks (Independent)
2001	6	1	0	--	--
New York Sharks (IWFL)
2002	7	0	0	1st East	Won IWFL Championship (Austin)
2003	8	0	0	1st EC Mid Atlantic	Won Eastern Conference Championship (Bay State); Lost IWFL Championship (Sacramento)
2004	8	0	0	1st EC Mid Atlantic	Won Eastern Conference Wildcard (Chicago); Won Eastern Conference Championship (Tampa Bay); Lost IWFL Championship (Sacramento)
2005	10	0	0	1st EC Mid Atlantic	Won Eastern Conference Wildcard (Southern Maine); Lost Eastern Conference Championship (Atlanta)
2006	8	0	0	1st EC Mid Atlantic	Won Eastern Conference Wildcard (Miami); Lost Eastern Conference Championship (Atlanta)
2007	6	2	0	1st EC North Atlantic	Won Eastern Conference Wildcard (Manchester); Lost Eastern Conference Championship (Atlanta)
2008	6	2	0	2nd Tier I EC North Atlantic	--
2009	4	4	0	3rd Tier I EC North Atlantic	--
2010	7	1	0	2nd Tier I EC Northeast	Lost Northeast Division Championship (Boston)
New York Sharks (WFA)
2011	5	3	0	2nd NC North	--
2012	4	4	0	2nd NC Division 2	Won National Conference Wildcard (Keystone); Lost National Conference Quarterfinal (Boston)
Totals	92	27	0	(including playoffs)	

* = current standing

== 2012 roster ==
New York Sharks roster
Quarterback: 30 Karen Mulligan; Running backs: 19 Gabrielle Nazaire; 31 Isabella Bluhm; 32 Janea Wilkerson; Wide receivers: 1 Alissa Anderson; 5 Erika Cottle; 11 Charonn Sutton; 15 Danielle Myers; 34 Melodie Abrook (TE); 81 Lauren Pringle; 82 Laura Baden; 85 Anaïs Sumnicht	Offensive line: 61 Lenahndem Tankeng (G/T); 74 Melissa Pickett (C/G); 75 Leslie Thompson (G); 90 Sarah Schkeeper (G); 93 Kymm Elliott (T); 99 Janelle Yarn; Defensive line: 13 Katie Rose; 47 Cornelia Myers; 58 Michelle Bresnahan; 66 Leah Maher; 79 Ruth Martinez; 91 Veronica Simmons (DE); Linebackers: 28 Collette V. Smith; 43 Erica Butler; 55 Laura Coleslaw; 59 Amy Deal Satterfield	Defensive backs: 29 Cheri Eleazer (FS); 41 Toni Salvatore (CB); 83 H. Marie Williams (FS); 28 Collette V. Smith (FS); Special teams: currently vacant; Multiple Positions: 3 Odessa Jenkins (RB/S); 8 Jay Dantzler (CB/RB); 27 Darleen Hall (WR/LB); 44 Yatia Hopkins (FB/DE); 46 Kristine Elmore (OL/LB); 57 Vivian Alberty (FB/OL); 77 Manouchka Joseph (NG/DT); 88 Larissa Davis (WR/DB); 93 Seleta Harrison (OL/DL)	Injured reserve: currently vacant; Exempt List: currently vacant; Practice squad: currently vacant; rookies in italics; Roster updated May 7, 2012; 40 Active, 2 Inactive, 0 PS

== 2009 ==
=== Season schedule ===
Date	Opponent	Home/Away	Result
April 11	New York Nemesis	Away	Won 21-7
April 25	Boston Militia	Home	Lost 7-21
May 2	Philadelphia Firebirds	Away	Won 33-14
May 9	Connecticut Crushers	Home	Won 40-7
May 16	D.C. Divas	Home	Lost 7-21
May 30	New England Intensity	Away	Won 44-0
June 6	D.C. Divas	Away	Lost 18-34
June 13	Pittsburgh Passion	Home	Lost 33-34

== 2010 ==
=== Season schedule ===
Date	Opponent	Home/Away	Result
April 10	Philadelphia Firebirds	Away	Won 64-0
April 17	D.C. Divas	Home	Won 19-13
April 24	Connecticut Crushers	Home	Won 65-14
May 1	Jersey Justice	Away	Won 50-8
May 8	Pittsburgh Passion	Home	Won 12-8
May 15	Boston Militia	Away	Lost 0-31
May 22	Baltimore Nighthawks	Home	Won 38-6
June 5	Pittsburgh Passion	Away	Won 27-10
June 12	Boston Militia (Northeast Division Championship)	Away	Lost 6-25

== 2011 ==
=== Standings ===
2011 WFA North Division
	W	L	T	PCT	PF	PA	DIV	GB	STK
y - Boston Militia	7	1	0	0.875	364	72	5-0	---	W7
z - New York Sharks	5	3	0	0.625	212	177	3-2	2.0	L1
Northeastern Nitro	4	4	0	0.500	46	243	2-3	3.0	L1
New England Nightmare	0	8	0	0.000	28	264	0-5	7.0	L8

y - clinched division title
z - clinched playoff berth

=== Season schedule ===
Date	Opponent	Home/Away	Result
April 2	Philadelphia Liberty Belles	Away	Won 34-20
April 16	Boston Militia	Away	Lost 7-28
April 30	New England Nightmare	Home	Won 48-12
May 7	Northeastern Nitro	Home	Won 27-21
May 21	Boston Militia	Home	Lost 6-43
June 4	New England Nightmare	Away	Won 28-8
June 11	Northeastern Nitro	Away	Won 46-7
June 18	D.C. Divas	Home	Lost 16-38

== 2012 ==
=== Standings ===
2012 WFA Division 2
	W	L	T	PCT	PF	PA	DIV	GB	STK
y - Boston Militia	8	0	0	1.000	458	139	4-0	---	W8
z - New York Sharks	4	4	0	0.500	104	227	2-2	4	W2
Philadelphia Liberty Belles	2	6	0	0.250	30	234	0-3	6	L3

y - clinched division title
z - clinched division title

=== Season schedule ===
Date	Opponent	Home/Away	Result
April 14	Boston Militia	Away	Lost 6-64
April 21	Maine Lynx	Away	Won 6-0**
April 28	D.C. Divas	Away	Lost 12-41
May 5	Philadelphia Liberty Belles	Home	Won 25-8
May 12	D.C. Divas	Home	Lost 13-41
June 2	Philadelphia Liberty Belles	Away	Won 31-0
June 9	New England Nightmare	Home	Won 72-14
June 16	Boston Militia	Home	Lost 12-55

** = Won by forfeit
