= Philadelphia Firebirds (IWFL) =

Women's football team

- Founded: 2003
- League: Independent Women's Football League
- Team history: Philadelphia Phoenix (NWFA) (2003–2008); Philadelphia Firebirds (IWFL) (2009–present)
- Based in: Philadelphia, Pennsylvania
- Stadium: Franklin Field
- Colors: Red, white, blue, gold
- President: Tawana Grayson
- Head coach: Lorenzo O'Branty
- General manager: Farah Dailey
- Championships: 0
- Mascot: Firebird

The Philadelphia Firebirds are a women's football team in the Independent Women's Football League based in Philadelphia. They are in the Eastern Conference, North Atlantic Division with the Boston Militia, New York Nemesis, and New York Sharks. The team was formerly known as the Philadelphia Phoenix and formerly played in the National Women's Football Association. Upon moving to the IWFL, they changed their name so as to avoid confusion with their fellow IWFL franchise, the Carolina Phoenix.

Philadelphia's first women's tackle football team was founded in 2001 as the Philadelphia Liberty Belles. The Belles won the inaugural NWFL Championship that year. In 2002, the Belles lost in the semi-final playoff round. Heading into the 2003 season, the team split and the Philadelphia Phoenix was formed. The two teams existed simultaneously until the Philadelphia Liberty Belles eventually folded. The Liberty Belles have since reformed for the 2009 season and have joined the new WFA.

== Season-by-season ==
Season records
Season	W	L	T	Finish	Playoff results
Philadelphia Phoenix (NWFA)
2003	7	1	0	1st North North	First-round bye Won Eastern Conference Semifinal (D.C.); Lost Eastern Conference Championship (Detroit)
2004	7	1	0	1st North North	Lost Northern Conference Qualifier (Southwest Michigan)
2005	4	4	0	13th North Division	–
2006	5	3	0	2nd North East	Lost NWFA First Round (Cleveland)
2007	1	6	0	2nd North South	–
2008	8	0	0	1st North East	First-round bye Won Northern Conference Semifinal (Columbus); Lost Northern Conference Championship (West Michigan)
Philadelphia Firebirds (IWFL)
2009	1	7	0	4th Tier I East North Atlantic	–
2010	1	7	0	5th Tier I East Northeast	–
2011	2	4	1	3rd East mid-Atlantic	-
Totals	38	37	1	(including playoffs)	

== Season schedules ==
=== 2009 ===
Date	Opponent	Home/Away	Result
April 18	Baltimore Nighthawks	Home	Lost 15–22
April 25	Connecticut Crushers	Home	Won 31–12
May 2	New York Sharks	Home	Lost 14–33
May 9	New York Nemesis	Away	Lost 3–34
May 16	Boston Militia	Away	Lost 0–60
May 30	D.C. Divas	Home	Lost 0–42
June 6	Pittsburgh Passion	Home	Lost 0–53
June 13	D.C. Divas	Away	Lost 0–63

=== 2010 ===
Date	Opponent	Home/Away	Result
April 3	Baltimore Nighthawks	Away	Lost 0–54
April 10	New York Sharks	Home	Lost 0–64
April 17	Pittsburgh Passion	Away	Lost 0–49
April 24	D.C. Divas	Home	Lost 0–1**
May 1	New York Nemesis	Away	Lost 0–33
May 15	Binghamton Tiger Cats	Home	Won 49–0
May 22	Boston Militia	Home	Lost 0–1**
May 29	D.C. Divas	Away	Lost 3–49

** = Forfeited because of league action to reduce schedule
