= Sarah Schkeeper =

American football player and executive

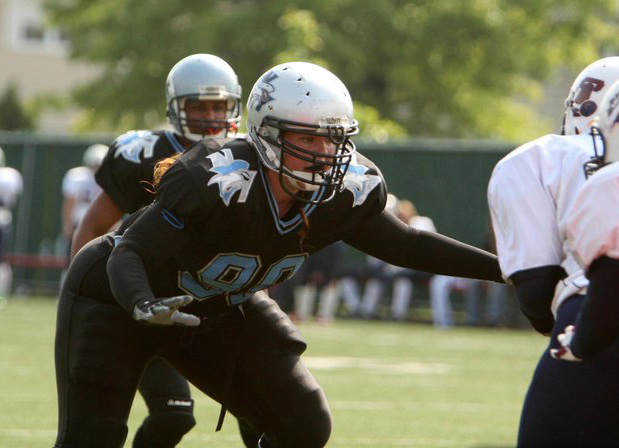
- Schkeeper at home game vs Philadelphia in 2011

Richmond Black Widows
- Title: President

Personal information
- Born: Livingston, New Jersey
- Listed height: 6 ft 0 in (1.83 m)
- Listed weight: 230 lb (104 kg)

Career information
- College: Temple University, Pratt Institute

Career history

Playing
- New York Sharks (2009–2013)

Operations
- Richmond Black Widows (2016–Present) Founder

Sarah Schkeeper
Medal record

Women's American football

Representing United States

World Championship
Gold medal – first place	2013 Finland	Team competition

Sarah Schkeeper is an American former football guard for the New York Sharks. Nicknamed "The Viking" because she wears braided pigtails in games, she joined the New York Sharks in 2009 as a rookie and has started in every career game. She was also nicknamed "The Crypt-Schkeeper" by her teammates. Due to moving out of the area she stopped playing for the New York Sharks after the 2013 season. She has since started a team in the Richmond, Virginia area, called the Richmond Black Widows.

== Early life ==
The youngest of three children Schkeeper was raised in Livingston, New Jersey with her two older brothers by her mother. Though she played football with the boys growing up Schkeeper didn't play an organized sport until joining the New York Sharks in 2009.

== Football career ==
=== New York Sharks ===
Schkeeper plays guard for the New York Sharks, the longest running and winningest professional women's football team in history. She has started as either right or left guard in every career game.

=== USA National Team ===
In 2013, through a nationwide tryout held in Austin, Texas, she was selected to represent the US as part of USA Football's National Women's Team in the second IFAF Woman's World Championship to be held in Vantaa, Finland. They beat Sweden 84-0 and Germany 107–7 to advance to the gold medal match in which they beat Canada 64–0. She was the starting Right Guard.

=== Richmond Black Widows ===
In 2015, Schkeeper started a team in Richmond, Virginia, called the Richmond Black Widows. The team will be a part of the Women's Football Alliance. The team started in the 2016 season.

== Personal ==
An avid cyclist, Schkeeper was hit twice by vehicles (a van and an SUV truck) within a 4-month span before the start of the 2010 season while cycling in Brooklyn and suffered no broken bones (her injuries were limited to a concussion and a dislocated rib that went untreated for 6 months) earning her a reputation among her teammates for being "unbreakable".

She also enjoys playing full contact flag football with several of her teammates on a team called The Honey Badgers.

She was filmed for two NYC news channels and in both filmings she tackled the reporters.
