= Central PA Vipers =

- Founded: 2006
- League: Independent Women's Football League
- Team history: Harrisburg Angels (NWFA) (2006); Central PA Vipers (NWFA) (2007); Central PA Vipers (IWFL) (2008-2009)
- Based in: Harrisburg, Pennsylvania
- Stadium: War Veterans Memorial Field, aka Cottage Hill Field
- Colors: Midnight blue, white
- President: Lindsay Snowden & Kerry Wisher
- Head coach: "Keys, D, Ritt, Lonnie, and Michelle"
- Championships: 0

The Central PA Vipers were a team of the Independent Women's Football League. Based in the Steelton suburb of Harrisburg, Pennsylvania, the Vipers played their home games at Steelton-Highspire School District's War Veterans Memorial Field, also known as Cottage Hill. Prior to playing in the IWFL, the Vipers were a member of the National Women's Football Association in 2006 and 2007 (in their inaugural season, they were called the Harrisburg Angels).

After four seasons and twenty-seven attempts (not counting two forfeits by the Richmond Spirit in 2007), the Vipers finally picked up their first victory on the gridiron on June 6, 2009 thanks to a 48-0 triumph over the Holyoke Hurricanes. The following week, the Vipers continued their string of success, defeating the Cape Fear Thunder, 30-6.

== Season-by-season ==
Season records
Season	W	L	T	Finish	Playoff results
Harrisburg Angels (NWFA)
2006	0	8	0	4th Northern North Atlantic	--
Central PA Vipers (NWFA)
2007	2	7	0	4th Northern Central	--
Central PA Vipers (IWFL)
2008	0	8	0	6th Eastern North Atlantic	
2009	2	6	0	18th IWFL2	--
Totals	4	29	0	(including playoffs)	

== 2009 season schedule ==
Date	Opponent	Home/Away	Result
April 18	New England Intensity	Home	Lost 14-21
April 25	Manchester Freedom	Away	Lost 0-47
May 2	Erie Illusion	Away	Lost 8-61
May 9	Jersey Justice	Away	Lost 0-34
May 23	Southern Maine Rebels	Home	Lost 8-14
June 6	Holyoke Hurricanes	Home	Won 48-0
June 13	Cape Fear Thunder	Home	Won 30-6
June 20	Connecticut Crushers	Away	Lost 0-2**

** = Forfeited
