= D.C. Divas =

Women's gridiron football team

- Founded: 2000
- League: NWFA (2001–2006); IWFL (2007–2010); WFA (2011–present)
- Team history: D.C. Divas (2001–present)
- Based in: Springfield, Virginia
- Stadium: Annandale High School
- Colors: Burgundy, gold, white
- Owner: Rich Daniel
- Head coach: Allysea Marfull
- Championships: 3 (2006 NWFA, 2015 WFA, 2016 WFA)

The D.C. Divas are a women's gridiron football team that plays in the Women's Football Alliance. Based in the Washington metropolitan area, the Divas play their home games at Annandale High School in Annandale, Virginia. Formerly, the Divas played at Eastern High School in Washington, D.C.; Largo High School in Largo, Maryland; the Prince George's Sports and Learning Complex in Landover (where the NFL's Washington Commanders' FedEx Field is located); John R. Lewis High School (known at the time as Lee High School) in Springfield; The St. James in Springfield, Virginia, and at Thomas Jefferson High School for Science and Technology in Alexandria, Virginia.

== History ==
=== 2001 ===
The Divas were formed in 2000 as one of the ten charter franchises of the National Women's Football Association. The Divas were the first women's football team in the nation's capital and were coached by Ezra Cooper. The Divas' first win came on May 13, 2001, with a 10–6 victory at home over the Connecticut Crush. The Divas finished their inaugural season with a 3–4 record, the team's only losing season to date.

=== 2002 ===
The Divas were purchased by Lee Fahringer and Kelly George before their second season. The Divas finished the 2002 season with a 5–3 record, the first of six consecutive winning seasons for the team. A chance at the Divas' first playoff berth came down their final game of the year, but the Divas fell short of the Baltimore Burn in their season finale, 6–0.

=== 2003 ===
The 2003 season is considered by many to be the birth of the Divas' dynasty. Finishing the regular-season 7–1, the team clinched their first of five consecutive playoff berths and division titles. After defeating the Connecticut Crush in their first ever playoff game, the Divas fell to the Philadelphia Phoenix in the conference semifinals. The Divas' Donna Wilkinson became the first running back in women's football history to eclipse 1,000 rushing yards in a single season, totaling 1,267 rushing yards in 2003. That year, the Divas were featured on CBS Evening News.

=== 2004 ===
Winning their second consecutive division title by finishing 8–0, the Divas clinched home-field advantage throughout the Northern Conference playoffs. After defeating the Southwest Michigan Jaguars in the conference semifinals, the Divas lost to the eventual NWFA champions, the Detroit Demolition, in the Northern Conference championship game, 20–14.

Following the season, the Divas played in a charity game against a men's team assembled by The Sports Junkies, who host a local syndicated sports radio show. Although the Divas lost, 28–6, the contest set a new record for the highest attendance at a women's football game, as 8,200 fans came to the event. Later that offseason, the Divas had a second ownership change when Paul Hamlin, father of Divas' quarterback Allyson Hamlin, bought the team.

=== 2005 ===
For the second consecutive season, the Divas finished the regular season with a perfect 8–0 record. For the second straight year, however, they were handed their first defeat of the season in the Northern Conference championship game by eventual NWFA champion Detroit.

After that season, the Divas moved from Eastern High School in Washington, D.C. to the new Prince George's Sports and Learning Complex in nearby Landover, Maryland, and a new uniform design was also unveiled. These changes set the stage for the biggest moment in the franchise's history.

=== 2006 ===
As was the case the past two seasons, the Divas finished 2006 with a perfect 8–0 regular season record and advanced to the conference championship game. Unlike '04 and '05, however, the Divas won the conference championship, defeating the Columbus Comets and advancing their first ever league championship game. The Divas traveled to Pittsburgh to take on the Oklahoma City Lightning for the 2006 NWFA national championship. The Divas capped an 11–0 season with a 28–7 victory over the Lightning for the team's first league championship. Running back Rachelle Pecovsky and linebacker Ivy Tillman received the game's MVP honors on offense and defense, respectively.

=== 2007 ===
Before the 2007 season, the Divas left the NWFA to join the Independent Women's Football League. The Divas were just as successful in this new league, however, finishing with an 8–0 regular season record for the fourth straight year and capturing the Mid-Atlantic Division title. However, their playoff run ended abruptly when the Divas lost in the conference semifinal round to the eventual Eastern Conference champion Atlanta Xplosion.

=== 2008 ===
2008 was a disappointing year for the Divas. The season began with a loss to the Boston Militia, 27–22, which snapped the Divas' 32-game regular season winning streak. That was a sign of things to come, as the Divas lost four games in 2008, each by six points or less. They finished the year with a 4–4 record, their worst since 2001. Because of that record, the Divas failed to win their division and missed the playoffs for the first time since 2002.

=== 2009 ===
Rebounding from the 2008 season, the Divas returned to their winning ways in 2009. The Divas compiled a perfect 8–0 regular season record for the fifth time and claimed the Mid-Atlantic division title. The Divas had home field advantage throughout the playoffs, but because of a scheduling conflict at their home field, they had to travel to Boston to play the Militia in the 2009 IWFL Eastern Conference championship game. In a thrilling game, the Divas defeated the Militia, 27–21, giving the franchise just their second conference championship (and their first in the IWFL). On July 25, the Divas went to Round Rock, Texas, a suburb of Austin, to play for the 2009 IWFL World Championship. The Western Conference champion Kansas City Tribe pulled a 21–18 upset and handed the Divas their first loss of the season, taking home the IWFL championship in the process.

=== 2010 ===
2010 was another successful season for the Divas. Despite finishing the regular season at 5-3 (two games behind the 7-1 Atlanta Xplosion), a stronger overall schedule gave the Divas the division crown, their seventh in team history. The Divas then justified their place in the division in the conference semifinals, defeating the Xplosion, 35–7, and getting some revenge for the playoff loss in 2007. However, it was the Militia who got revenge in the 2010 Eastern Conference championship game, avenging the previous season's defeat by eliminating the Divas; the Militia went on to win the 2010 IWFL national championship.

That season, the Divas were featured on CNN as part of a team profile. Also that season, former Diva wide receiver Natalie Randolph made national headlines as one of the first female head coaches of a high school football team.

=== 2011 ===
Along with many of their archrivals, the D.C. Divas moved from the IWFL to the Women's Football Alliance for the 2011 season. In their first year in the new league, the Divas didn't slow down, easily winning the Northeast Division with a 7–1 record. However, for the second year in a row, the eventual league champion Boston Militia ended the Divas' season by knocking them out of the playoffs.

After the season, the Divas made a change, hiring Alison Fischer as their new head coach. Fischer played on the Divas' first team in 2001 and became one of the few female head coaches in women's pro football.

=== 2012 ===
In a situation similar to 2010, the Divas, with a 5–3 record, claimed a division title over 7-1 Pittsburgh thanks to a stronger strength of schedule. Once again, the Divas proved that was the correct decision by defeating Pittsburgh in the playoffs and advancing to the conference semifinals.

For the fourth straight year, the Divas clashed with the Boston Militia in the playoffs, and for the third straight time, the Militia came out on top, this time by a 55–34 score. But this time emotions spilled over, and the game ended in a bench-clearing brawl which attracted negative media attention and resulted in several suspensions by the league against Divas players.

=== 2013 ===
For the third time in four seasons, the Divas finished the regular season with a 5–3 record. The Divas also won their tenth division title, which tied the record for the most division championships all-time in women's football by a single franchise. The D.C. Divas advanced to the conference semifinals, where they were eliminated for the fourth consecutive season by the Boston Militia.

=== 2014 ===
The D.C. Divas began their 14th season of play on April 5, 2014.

=== 2015 ===
The D.C. Divas were undefeated in the regular season, post-season, and beat the Dallas Elite for the national championship. Quarterback Allyson Hamlin threw her 200th touchdown and crossed the 13,000 yards passing mark for her career.

== Season-by-season ==
Season records
Season	W	L	T	Finish	Playoff results
D.C. Divas (NWFA)
2001	3	4	0	3rd Northern	--
2002	6	3	0	2nd Mid-Atlantic	--
2003	7	1	0	1st Northern Mid-Atlantic	Won Eastern Conference Quarterfinal (Connecticut); Lost Eastern Conference Semifinal (Philadelphia)
2004	8	0	0	1st Northern Mid-Atlantic	Won Northern Conference Semifinal (SW Michigan); Lost Northern Conference Championship (Detroit)
2005	8	0	0	1st Northern Mid-Atlantic	Won Northern Conference Semifinal (Massachusetts); Lost Northern Conference Championship (Detroit)
2006	8	0	0	1st Eastern Mid-Atlantic	Won Eastern Conference Semifinal (Chattanooga); Won Eastern Conference Championship (Columbus); Won NWFA National Championship (Oklahoma City)
D.C. Divas (IWFL)
2007	8	0	0	1st Eastern Mid-Atlantic	Lost Eastern Conference Semifinal (Atlanta)
2008	4	4	0	4th Tier I Eastern North Atlantic	—
2009	8	0	0	1st Tier I Easernt Mid-Atlantic	Won Eastern Conference Semifinal (Pittsburgh); Won Eastern Conference Championship (Boston); Lost IWFL Tier I World Championship (Kansas City)
2010	5	3	0	1st Tier I East Southeast	Won Southeast Division Championship (Atlanta); Lost Eastern Conference Championship (Boston)
D.C. Divas (WFA)
2011	7	1	0	1st National Northeast	Lost National Conference Quarterfinal (Boston)
2012	5	3	0	1st National Mid-Atlantic	Won National Conference Quarterfinal (Pittsburgh); Lost National Conference Semifinal (Boston)
2013	5	3	0	1st National Mid-Atlantic	Won National Conference Quarterfinal (Columbus); Lost National Conference Semifinal (Boston)
2014	5	4	0	1st National Mid-Atlantic	Won National Conference Quarterfinal (Columbus); Lost National Conference Semifinal (Boston)
2015	12	0	0	1st National Mid-Atlantic	Won National Conference Quarterfinal (Miami); Won National Conference Semifinal (Atlanta); Won National Conference Championship (Chicago); Won WFA National Championship (Dallas)
2016	10	1	0	1st National	Won National Conference Semifinal (Pittsburgh); Won National Conference Championship (Boston); Won WFA National Championship (Dallas)
2017	7	4	0	4th National	Won National Conference Semifinal (Cleveland); Lost National Conference Championship (Boston)
2018	7	3	0	1st National	Won National Conference Semifinal (Atlanta); Lost National Conference Championship (Boston)
2019	6	4	0	2nd National	Lost National Conference Championship (Boston)
2021	1	4	0	2nd National Northeast	Lost National Conference Semifinal (Tampa Bay)
2022	2	5	0	4th National	Lost National Conference Semifinal (Boston)
2023	3	3	0	4th National	—
2024	3	4	0	3rd National	Lost National Conference Semifinal (Boston)
2025	5	2	0	2nd National	Won National Conference Semifinal (Tampa Bay); TBD National Conference Championship (Pittsburgh)
Totals	154	65	0	(including playoffs)	

== 2015 roster ==
D.C. Divas alphabetical roster
80 Desiree Abrams (DL); 21 Kendra Bates (DB); 53 Missy Bedwell (OL); 59 Ariana Bembry (DL); 34 Ashley Branch (OL); 17 Callie Brownson (DB); 25 Lillian Cherry (WR); 68 Lauren Chesley (OL); 26 Stephanie Critzos (WR); 16 Genaya Davis (DB); 45 Helen Deer (LB); 77 Latriece Elcock (DL); 91 Sylvia Espinoza (LB); 63 Jenna Essenmacher (P/K); 87 Quiana Ford (DB); 83 Shaquanda Gainey (DB); 23 Natalie Gaston (LB); 51 DeVon Goldsmith (DL); 76 Jennifer Gray (OL); 30 Nikia Green (LB); 29 Kenyetta Grigsby (RB)	64 Emily Grossman (OL); 19 Allyson Hamlin (QB); 67 Asia Hardy (OL); 46 Kasee Hillard (WR); 35 Alicia Hopkins (LB); 70 Ellen Howard (OL); 60 Rachel Huhn (OL); 14 Eleni Kotsis (DB); 69 Trecia Lewis (OL); 48 Kamil Maclin (LB); 3 Cherre Marshall (LB); 41 Jenne Massie (FB); 58 Trigger McNair (LB); 82 Melissa Mitchell (WR); 10 Safi Mojidi (LB); 92 Kianna Murphy (TE); 89 Stephanie Nealis (P/K); 15 Xuan Nguyen (LB); 20 Tytti Niemi (RB); 7 Okiima Pickett (RB)	66 Adele Roberts-White (OL); 5 Kira Robinson (LB); 52 Brittany Rock (DL); 62 Ashley Rozendaal (OL); 99 Devoralyn Savage (DL); 4 D’Ajah Scott (DB); 32 Natalie Silk (DL); 50 Whitney Simms (LB); 27 Christina Smith (DL); 11 Paris Smith (LB); 39 Tasha Smith (TE); 22 Lindsay Sollers (DB); 37 Crystal St. Martin (WR); 6 Francesca Stabel (FB); 40 Jimmien Strong (DL); 36 Sacoyia Todd (DB); 89 Christina Tu (DB); 28 Ayrica Walker (WR); 93 Denee Walker (DL); 86 Melissa Washington (TE)	44 Tia Watkins (LB); 12 Ashley Whisonant (WR); 65 Shannon Whitehead (OL); 33 Donna Wilkinson (LB); 54 Ariella Williams (OL); 81 Erica Williams (RB); 85 Kentrina Wilson (WR); 13 Eris Woodard (RB); 74 Becky Worsham (OL); 69 Players; Roster updated August 16, 2015

== Season schedules and standings ==
=== 2009 ===
Date	Opponent	Home/Away	Result
April 11	Baltimore Nighthawks	Away	Won 33–0
April 25	Detroit Demolition	Away	Won 35–0
May 2	Pittsburgh Passion	Home	Won 27–7
May 16	New York Sharks	Away	Won 21–7
May 23	Baltimore Nighthawks	Home	Won 70–14
May 30	Philadelphia Firebirds	Away	Won 42–0
June 6	New York Sharks	Home	Won 34–18
June 13	Philadelphia Firebirds	Home	Won 63–0
June 27	Pittsburgh Passion (Eastern Conference Semifinal)	Home	Won 27–17
July 11	Boston Militia (Eastern Conference Championship)	Away	Won 27–21
July 25	Kansas City Tribe (IWFL Tier I World Championship)	Neutral (Round Rock)	Lost 18–21

=== 2010 ===
Date	Opponent	Home/Away	Result
April 10	Baltimore Nighthawks	Home	Won 54–6
April 17	New York Sharks	Away	Lost 13–19
April 24	Philadelphia Firebirds	Away	Won 1–0**
May 1	Boston Militia	Home	Lost 35–42
May 8	Baltimore Nighthawks	Away	Won 28–7
May 22	New York Nemesis	Home	Won 49–21
May 29	Philadelphia Firebirds	Home	Won 49–3
June 5	Boston Militia	Away	Lost 36–52
June 12	Atlanta Xplosion (Southeast Division Championship)	Home	Won 35–7
July 10	Boston Militia (Eastern Conference Championship)	Away	Lost 0-28

** Won by forfeit as a result of the IWFL's season reduction for the Firebirds

=== 2011 ===
2011 Northeast Division
	W	L	T	PCT	PF	PA	DIV	GB	STK
y-D.C. Divas	7	1	0	0.875	332	69	4-0	---	W1
Keystone Assault	3	5	0	0.375	92	166	1-3	4.0	W2
Philadelphia Liberty Belles	2	6	0	0.250	137	219	1-3	5.0	L4

Date	Opponent	Home/Away	Result
April 2	Boston Militia	Home	Won 35–20
April 9	Keystone Assault	Home	Won 55–6
April 16	Philadelphia Liberty Belles	Home	Won 20–0
April 30	Keystone Assault	Away	Won 49–0
May 7	Northeastern Nitro	Home	Won 77–0
May 21	Philadelphia Liberty Belles	Away	Won 42–0
June 11	Boston Militia	Away	Lost 16–27
June 18	New York Sharks	Away	Won 38–16
June 25	Boston Militia (National Conference Quarterfinal)	Home	Lost 24–37

=== 2012 ===
2012 Division 3
	W	L	T	PCT	PF	PA	DIV	GB	STK
Pittsburgh Passion	7	1	0	0.875	407	90	3-1	---	W3
D.C. Divas	5	3	0	0.625	289	157	4-1	1	L1
Columbus Comets	2	6	0	0.250	78	139	0-2	4	W1

Date	Opponent	Home/Away	Result
April 14	Pittsburgh Passion	Home	Lost 34–35
April 28	New York Sharks	Home	Won 41–12
May 5	Columbus Comets	Home	Won 49–0
May 12	New York Sharks	Away	Won 41–12
May 19	Boston Militia	Away	Lost 7-44
June 2	Pittsburgh Passion	Away	Won 43–28
June 9	Boston Militia	Home	Lost 25–32
June 16	Columbus Comets	Away	Won 42–0
June 30	Pittsburgh Passion (National Conference Quarterfinal)	Home	Won 45–30
July 7	Boston Militia (National Conference Semifinal)	Away	Lost 34–55

== See also ==
- Sports in Washington, D.C.
