= Saadia Ashraf =

American football player and coach

Saadia Ashraf is an American football coach for Team Canada, Team Quebec, and the Montreal Blitz Football Organizations. She is also a former championship quarterback of Team Canada, Team Quebec and the Montreal Blitz. She has a Bachelor of Education degree in Physical Education from McGill University, and works as a high school teacher in Montreal. She also actively coaches youth girls and boys flag football in the high school GMAA/RSEQ league. In addition she has been the head coach of the John Abbott College Women's Flag Football team since 1996. (Quebec).

== Playing career ==
While in high school, Ashraf's parents did not permit her to play contact sports. During this time she started playing touch football. In her early twenties she joined the Montreal Blitz as a quarterback, and in 2004 bought the team when the original owners wanted to sell. In 2010 she played in the first ever IFAF Women's World Championship in Sweden, winning a silver medal. In 2012 she won the Independent Women's Football League world championship with the Montreal Blitz. In 2013 she again quarterbacked Team Canada to a silver medal at the IFAF Women World's, this time in Finland.

== Coaching career ==
Ashraf has coached several different women's tackle football teams including Team Canada (Quarterbacks), Team Quebec (Head Coach), and the Montreal Blitz (Head Coach). She is also the head coach of the flag football team at John Abbott College.
