= Baltimore Nighthawks =

Women's American football team

- Founded: 2007
- League: IWFL (2008–2016); WFA (2017–present)
- Team history: Baltimore Nighthawks (2008–present)
- Stadium: Archbishop Spalding High School
- Colors: Purple, black, white, silver
- Owner: Tanya Bryan
- Head coach: Mike Lynn
- Championships: 1 (2026 WFA D2)
- Mascot: "Nelly the Nighthawk"

The Baltimore Nighthawks are a women's American football team in the Women's Football Alliance. The Nighthawks played their inaugural game in Brooklandville at Martin D. Tullai Field (adjacent to St. Paul's School). The Nighthawks played the remainder of their home season at the Baltimore Lutheran School in Towson.

The Baltimore Nighthawks support several charitable organizations including Healthcare for the Homeless, Special Olympics Maryland through the annual Polar Bear Plunge, various breast cancer groups, and the Central Maryland Girl Scouts. On March 21, 2009, the Nighthawks made women's football history when they hosted the first Pink Ribbon Bowl. The goal was to raise awareness about breast cancer and introduce professional women's tackle football to a broader audience. A portion of the proceeds benefited the Susan G. Komen for the Cure foundation for breast cancer research. The Baltimore Nighthawks have supported Healthcare for the Homeless since 2009 by volunteering for the Chocolate Affair.

In 2025, the Nighthawks had their best season in team history, finishing 8-1 and going undefeated during the regular season. They ultimately fell short in the WFA Division II Championship to the Salt Lake Wildcats.

The Baltimore Nighthawks earned their first National Championship title in their 19-year history by defeating the Oklahoma City Lady Force 22-20 in the 2026 WFA Division II Championship. They finished 7-2 for the season.

== Season-by-season ==
Season records
Season	W	L	T	Finish	Playoff results
2008	2	6	0	5th Eastern North Atlantic	--
2009	3	5	0	4th Eastern Mid-Atlantic	--
2010	3	5	0	4th Eastern Southeast	--
2011	3	4	1	2nd Eastern Mid-Atlantic	Lost Founders Bowl Tournament Quarterfinal (New England Intensity)
2012	7	2	0	1st Eastern Mid-Atlantic	Lost Eastern Conference Semifinal (Montreal Blitz)
2013	0	7	0	4th Eastern Mid-Atlantic	--
2014	4	5	0	3rd Eastern Mid-Atlantic	Lost Founders Bowl (Madison Blaze)
2015	3	4	0	3rd Eastern Mid-Atlantic	--
2016	3	5	0	6th Eastern Atlantic	--
2017	4	4	0	9th WFA II National Rankings	--
2018	4	4	0	WFA II National Rankings	--
2019	4	4	0	WFA II National Rankings	--
2020	0	0	0	WFA II National Rankings	--
2021	4	3	0	3rd WFA II National Rankings	Lost National Conference Semifinals (Detroit Dark Angels)
2022	4	4	0	2nd WFA II National Rankings	Lost National Conference Finals (Derby City Dynamite)
2023	5	3	0	4th WFA II National Rankings	Lost National Conference Finals (New York Wolves)
2024	4	3	0	4th WFA II National Rankings	Lost National Conference Semifinals (Atlanta Rage)
2025	8	1	0	1st WFA II National Rankings	Lost Division II Championship (Salt Lake Wildcats)
2026	7	2	0	3rd WFA II National Rankings	Division II Champions (Oklahoma City Lady Force)
Totals	72	71	1		

== Season schedules ==
=== 2009 ===
Date	Opponent	Home/Away	Result
April 11	D.C. Divas	Home	Lost 0-33
April 18	Philadelphia Firebirds	Away	Won 22-15
April 25	Pittsburgh Passion	Away	Lost 0-49
May 2	Detroit Demolition	Home	Lost 0-13
May 16	Jersey Justice	Home	Won 32-6
May 23	D.C. Divas	Away	Lost 14-70
May 30	Boston Militia	Home	Lost 0-68
June 6	Connecticut Crushers	Away	Won 30-8

=== 2010 ===
Date	Opponent	Home/Away	Result
April 3	Philadelphia Firebirds	Home	Won 54-0
April 10	D.C. Divas	Away	Lost 6-54
April 24	New York Nemesis	Home	Won 7-6
May 1	Carolina Queens	Away	Won 21-0
May 8	D.C. Divas	Home	Lost 7-28
May 15	Pittsburgh Passion	Away	Lost 6-34
May 22	New York Sharks	Away	Lost 6-38
June 5	Carolina Phoenix	Home	Lost 20-22 (OT)

=== 2014 ===
Date	Opponent	Home/Away	Result
April 12	Keystone Assault	Home	Lost 6-13
April 26	Carolina Queens	Away	Won 28-22
May 3	Philadelphia Firebirds	Home	Won 14-12
May 10	Philadelphia Firebirds	Away	Won 2-0
May 17	Washington Prodigy	Away	Lost 0-15
May 31	Carolina Queens	Home	Won 32-8
June 7	Washington Prodigy	Home	Lost 14-26
June 14	Pittsburgh Passion	Home	Lost 6-38
July 26	Madison Blaze	Away	Lost 14-31

=== 2018 ===
Date	Opponent	Home/Away	Result
April 7	New York Sharks	Home	L 34 - 38
April 14	Carolina Phoenix	Home	W 48 - 0
April 21	Keystone Assault	Away	W 55 - 0
April 28	New York Sharks	Away	L 49 - 26
May 12	Philadelphia Phantomz	Home	L 26 - 0
May 19	Richmond Black Widows	Away	N/A
June 2	Boston Renegades	Away	L 42 - 0
June 9	Keystone Assault	Home	W 2-0 (Forfeit)

=== 2019 ===
Date	Opponent	Home/Away	Result
April 6	Richmond Black Widows	Home	W 61-22
April 13	Philadelphia Phantomz	Away	W 21-20
April 27	Philadelphia Phantomz	Home	W 26-13
May 4	Pittsburgh Passion	Away	L 0-34
May 11	New York Wolves	Home	L 7-2
May 18	Boston Renegades	Away	L 0-68
June 1	Connecticut Hawks	Away	W 28-3
June 8	Boston Renegades	Home	L 6-63

=== 2020 ===
Date	Opponent	Home/Away	Result
April 4	New York Wolves	Away	
April 11	Richmond Black Widows	Away	
April 18	Columbus Comets	Home	
May 2	D.C. Divas	Away	
May 9	New York Wolves	Home	
May 16	Cleveland Fusion	Away	
May 30	Richmond Black Widows	Home	
June 6	D.C. Divas	Home	

=== 2021 ===
Date	Opponent	Home/Away	Result
May 1	Richmond Black Widows	Home	W 45-0
May 8	D.C. Divas	Home	L 0-38
May 22	Boston Renegades	Away	L 0-62
June 5	Richmond Black Widows	Away	W 25-16
June 12	Carolina Phoenix	Home	W 48-7
June 19	D.C. Divas	Away	W 14-13
June 26	Detroit Dark Angels	Home	L 0-12

=== 2022 ===
Date	Opponent	Home/Away	Result
April 9	D.C. Divas	Away	L 6-67
April 16	Tri State Warriors	Away	W 13-0
April 30	D.C. Divas	Home	L 6-42
May 7	New York Wolves	Away	L 13-14
May 14	Tri State Warriors	Home	W 45-6
May 28	Columbus Chaos	Home	W 36-32
June 11	Columbus Chaos	Home	W 45-24
June 25	Derby City Dynamite	Away	L 12-40

=== 2023 ===
Date	Opponent	Home/Away	Result
April 22	Carolina Phoenix	Home	W 27-6
April 29	New York Wolves	Home	L 14-28
May 13	Tri State Warriors	Away	W 33-8
May 20	Columbus Chaos	Away	W 8-6
June 3	New York Wolves	Away	L 18-15
June 10	Tri State Warriors	Home	W 57-0
June 24	Columbus Chaos	Away	W 13-11
July 8	New York Wolves	Away	L 26-27

=== 2024 ===
Date	Opponent	Home/Away	Result
April 27	Carolina Phoenix	Home	W 43-0
May 4	New York Wolves	Away	W 41-0
May 11	Columbus Chaos	Home	W 34-0
May 18	D.C. Divas	Away	L 6-41
June 8	NY Knockout	Away	L 12-22
June 15	New York Wolves	Home	W 33-8
June 29	Atlanta Rage	Away	L 12-27

=== 2025 ===
Date	Opponent	Home/Away	Result
May 3	Maine Mayhem	Home	W 41-6
May 10	Columbus Chaos	Away	W 35-0
May 17	Virginia Panthers	Away	W 21-20
May 31	Philadelphia Phantomz	Home	W 44-0
June 7	Atlanta Rage	Home	W 51-28
June 14	New York Knockout	Home	W 40-27
June 28	West Palm Beach Coyotes	Home	W 28-16
July 12	Cincinnati Cougars	Home	W 29-28
July 25	Salt Lake Wildcats	Neutral	L 0-19

=== 2026 ===
Date	Opponent	Home/Away	Result
April 25	Richmond Black Widows	Home	W 14-12
May 2	D.C. Divas	Away	L 12-55
May 9	Richmond Black Widows	Away	L 29-28
May 16	Philadelphia Phantomz	Home	W 28-22
May 30	Columbus Chaos	Home	W 58-8
June 13	Maine Mayhem	Away	W 71-0
June 27	West Palm Beach Coyotes	Away	W 15-6
July 11	Atlanta Rage	Home	W 34-6
July 24	Oklahoma City Lady Force	Neutral	W 22-20

== Roster ==
Baltimore Nighthawks Roster 2026
Quarterback: 3 Lauren Vetock; Running Backs: 7 Donika Everett; 34 Chanel Ross; 35 Lauren Brown; Fullbacks: 8 Jennifer Whitfield; 32 Bianca Brinson; Wide Receivers: 11 Leann Ziobro; 14 Michaela McComas; 33 Tania Bates; 44 Sabrina Pellegrini; 87 Maya Johnson; Offensive Line: 51 Alliyia Ingram; 52 Courtney Burkett; 66 Shamieka Covington; 69 Naeemah Buchanan; 71 Ana Hodgson; 73 Charity Gilbert; 74 KierstinElisa Cabada; 77 Kai Roe Perry; 78 Tanesha Carter; 90 TJ Jordan	Linebackers: 24 Rashida Ford; 43 Brittney Ross; 47 Ajee Anderson; 88 Trinitee Grant; Defensive Line: 30 RoRo Davis; 76 Ky Robertson; 91 Kareema Pearson; 93 Shane Berry; 95 Amanda Graham; Defensive Ends: 19 RJ Davis; 56 Ginevie Solis; 92 Ni'Ja Green-Simmons; 97 Andrea Kappler; 99 Sophie Adgate	Defensive Backs: 4 Elainia Rozier; 13 Sherri Anderson; 16 Kelsi Harris; 21 Ja'Naiya Stoakley; 37 Van Dos Santos; 42 Fuego Milian; 89 Tierra Simmons; Specialists: 3 Lauren Vetock (P); 8 Jennifer Whitfield (K); 52 Courtney Burkett (LS); 73 Charity Gilbert (LS)
