= Montreal Blitz =

Gridiron football team in Montreal, Canada

- Founded: 2001
- League: IWFL (2001–2016); WFA (2017); CCWFL (2021–present)
- Based in: Lachine, Quebec
- Stadium: Dalbé-Viau High School
- Colours: Red, black, white
- President: Saadia Ashraf
- Head coach: Pierre Migner
- Championships: 4 (2008 & 2010 Tier II; 2012 Tier I; 2013 Founder's Bowl)
- Website: montrealblitz.ca

The Montreal Blitz is a women's gridiron football team, founded in 2001, which plays Canadian football in the Central Canadian Women's Football League. Previously, the team played American football in the Independent Women's Football League (2001–2016) and in the Women's Football Alliance (in 2017). They are based at Dalbé-Viau High School in the borough of Lachine, in Montreal, Quebec.

The Blitz were the only Canadian team in a women's American football league. The team won four championships in the IWFL, at various levels. Their highest achievement came in 2012, when they beat the Sacramento Sirens 28–27 to become World Champions of the IWFL.

== History ==
The Blitz were created in 2001 and joined the IWFL. The team's quarterback in 2001 and 2003 was Samantha Rapoport.

In 2004, quarterback Saadia Ashraf bought the team from the original owners.

The team won four championships in the IWFL between 2008 and 2013, including the Tier I title in 2012.

In 2015, the management of the team was transferred from Saadia Ashraf to Football Féminin Blitz de Montréal, a non-profit created to run the team. The Blitz played in 2016 in the IWFL and in the Football Canada Women's National Championship, representing Quebec.

In 2016, Montreal decided to leave the IWFL due to financial and travel constraints, and joined the WFA. However, the Blitz resigned from the WFA after only one season (2017), because the league refused to allow any more games to be played in Canada.

In 2021, the Blitz was a founder member of the CCWFL, which began play in the 2022 season.
