= Independent Women's Football League =

US women's American football league

- Sport: Women's American football
- Founded: 2000
- Folded: 2018
- Countries: United States
- Last champions: IWFL League-- Houston Energy; Founders Bowl winner-- San Antonio Regulators; Affiliate Bowl winner-- No game played
- Most titles: Sacramento Sirens (3)
- Website: iwflsports.com

The Independent Women's Football League (IWFL) was the first women's American football league established by women players for women players. The league was founded in 2000, began play in 2001, and played its last season in 2018. Members of the original Austin Outlaws roster were the league's founders. Following the league's establishment as a separate entity from the team, former Outlaws players Laurie Frederick, Jaime Bailey, and Sandra Plato became the league's original IWFL executive council.

The players were amateur/semi-professional and had to cover part of their expenses.

== History ==
The league was founded in 2000 and began play in 2001. By 2008, the league had more than 1,600 women playing for 40 teams across North America. The 2008 IWFL National Championship game was held at the Holmgren Athletic Complex in Chicago. The Dallas Diamonds defeated the Chicago Force in overtime with a final score of 35–29.

The Woman's Football Alliance (WFA) was founded in 2009 and began poaching top players and entire teams from the IWFL. The WFA charged teams $2,000 in startup fees, while the IWFL was charging teams $2,000–$6,700. By 2016, the IWFL had lowered its fees, but the WFA was the bigger league with 44 teams compared to the IWFL's 36 teams.

In 2014, there were talks between the IWFL and the WFA about a potential merger. Ultimately, IWFL chief operating officer Kezia Disney declined to move forward.

== 2019 season teams ==
=== Central Division ===
Team	Location	Home Field
Kansas City Fire	Kansas City, MO	Joes Hot Sauce Stadium

=== Pacific Division ===
Team	Location	Home Field

=== Expansion 2020/inactive teams ===
Team	Location	Home Field
Austin Yellow Jackets	Austin, Texas
North County Stars	Carlsbad, California
Rialto Rebels	San Bernardino, California
Rogue Valley Elements	Grants Pass, Oregon
Sacramento Sirens	Sacramento, California
San Antonio Regulators	San Antonio, Texas
San Diego Shockwave	San Diego, California
So Cal Scorpions	Temecula, California
South Texas Lady Crushers	Corpus Christi, Texas
Temecula-Hemet Heroines	Hemet, California	Also in Temecula, CA
Ventura Black Widows	Ventura, California	Also in Oxnard, California
West Texas Lady Hurricanes	El Paso, Texas

== Former IWFL teams playing elsewhere ==
- Arlington Impact — played in the IWFL from 2012 to 2014, now in the WFA.
- Austin Outlaws — played in the IWFL from 2001, joined the WFA in 2009.
- Baltimore Nighthawks — played in the IWFL from 2008 to 2016, now in the WFA.
- D.C. Divas — played in the IWFL from 2007 to 2010, now in the WFA.
- Houston Energy — played in the IWFL from 2009 to 2018, joined the WFA in 2019.
- Kansas City Storm — played in the IWFL from 2005 to 2007, currently playing in the Women's Xtreme Football League of Kansas/Oklahoma (WXFL).
- Keystone Assault — played in the IWFL from 2013 to 2014, now in the U.S. Women's Football League (USWFL).
- New York Knockout — played in the IWFL from 2013 to 2014, now in the WFA.
- Oregon Hawks (formerly Eugene LadyHawks) – played in the IWFL in 2018, now in the WFA.
- San Diego Surge — played in the IWFL, joined the Women's National Football Conference (WNFC) in 2019.
- Minnesota Vixen — played in the IWFL from 2009 to 2016, joined the WFA in 2017.
- Seattle Majestics — played in the IWFL, joined the WNFC in 2019.
- Texas Elite Spartans — played in the IWFL, joined the WNFC in 2019.
- Utah Falconz — played in the IWFL, joined the WNFC in 2019.

== Champions ==
=== Tier I ===
- 2001 — Austin Outlaws – Champion by record
- 2002 — New York Sharks 24, Austin Outlaws 4
- 2003 — Sacramento Sirens 41, New York Sharks 30
- 2004 — Sacramento Sirens 29, New York Sharks 27
- 2005 — Sacramento Sirens 9, Atlanta Xplosion 7
- 2006 — Atlanta Xplosion 21, Detroit Demolition 14
- 2007 — Detroit Demolition 17, Atlanta Xplosion 7
- 2008 — Dallas Diamonds 35, Chicago Force 29
- 2009 — Kansas City Tribe 21, D.C. Divas 18
- 2010 — Boston Militia 39, Sacramento Sirens 7
- 2011 — Atlanta Ravens 24, California Quake 22
- 2012 — Montreal Blitz 28, Sacramento Sirens 27
- 2013 — Carolina Phoenix 14, Houston Energy 0
- 2014 — Pittsburgh Passion 41, Houston Energy 7
- 2015 — Pittsburgh Passion 41, Utah Falconz 37
- 2016 — Utah Falconz 49, Minnesota Vixen 6
- 2017 — Utah Falconz 35, Austin Yellow Jackets 18
- 2018 — Houston Energy 34, Nevada Storm 0

=== Tier II ===
- 2008 — Montreal Blitz 26, Clarksville Fox 6
- 2009 — Wisconsin Warriors 42, Montreal Blitz 14
- 2010 — Montreal Blitz 9, Bay Area Bandits 2
- 2011 — Seattle Majestics 20, New England Intensity 0

=== Founders Bowl (Tier II Championship) ===
- 2012 — Carolina Phoenix 27, Portland Shockwave 0
- 2013 — Montreal Blitz 55, Arlington Impact 8
- 2014 — Madison Blaze 31, Baltimore Nighthawks 14
- 2015 — Carolina Phoenix 32, Madison Blaze 9
- 2016 — Carolina Phoenix 20, Carson Bobcats 12
- 2017 — Colorado Freeze 27, San Antonio Regulators 6
- 2018 — San Antonio Regulators 30, Tulsa Threat 0

=== Affiliate Bowl (Tier III Championship) ===
- 2012 — Carolina Queens 18, Colorado Sting 0
- 2013 — Carolina Queens 28, San Antonio Regulators 14
- 2014 — Carolina Queens 28, Minnesota Vixens 22
- 2015 — Detroit Pride 24, San Antonio Regulators 22
- 2016 — Maine Mayhem 48, Knoxville Lightning 0

== See also ==
- American football in the United States
- Women's football in the United States
- Women's American football
- List of leagues of American football
