= Penalty (gridiron football) =

Penalty in American football

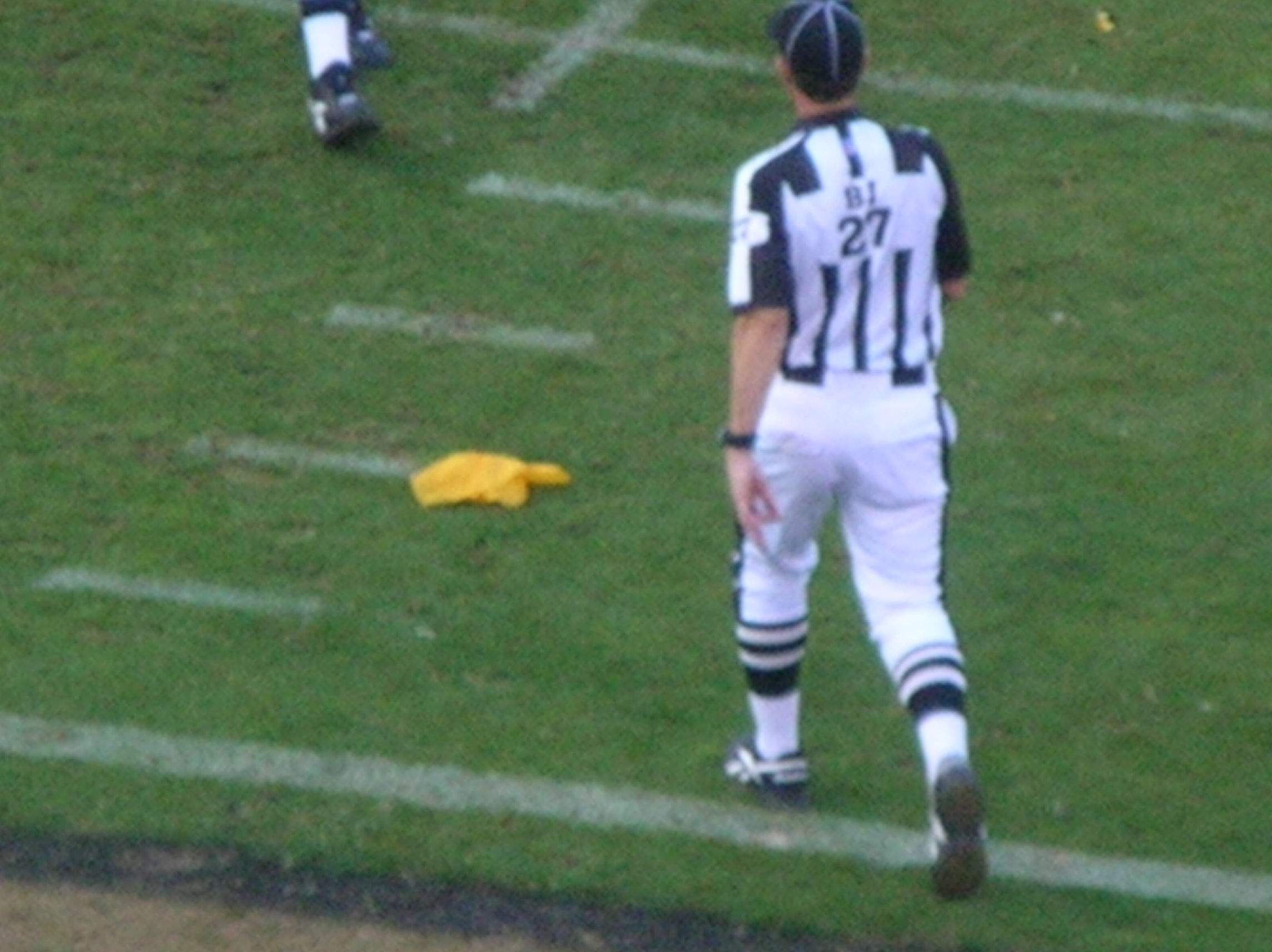
NFL back judge Lee Dyer retrieves a penalty flag on the field during a game on November 16, 2008 between the San Francisco 49ers and St. Louis Rams.

In gridiron football, a penalty is a sanction assessed against a team for a violation of the rules, called a foul. Officials initially signal penalties by tossing a bright yellow colored penalty flag onto the field toward or at the spot of a foul.

Many penalties result in moving the football toward the offending team's end zone, usually in 5 yard increments. Penalties may go as high as 25 yards depending on the penalty and league. Most penalties against the defensive team also result in the offense receiving an automatic first down, while a few penalties against the offensive team cause them to automatically lose a down.

In some cases, depending on the spot of the foul, the ball is moved half the distance to the goal line rather than the usual number of yards, or the defense scores an automatic safety.

== Rationale ==
Because football is a high-contact sport requiring a balance between offense and defense, many rules exist that regulate equality, safety, contact, and actions of players on each team. It is very difficult to always avoid violating these rules without giving up too much of an advantage. Thus, an elaborate system of fouls and penalties has been developed to "let the punishment fit the crime" and maintain a balance between following the rules and keeping a good flow of the game. For example, it is in large part because sacking the quarterback typically results in a loss of about ten yards, and because illegal holding is often committed by members of the offense in an effort to prevent the quarterback from being sacked, that the penalty for a holding foul is set at ten yards.

Players and coaches are constantly looking for ways to find an advantage that stretches the limitations imposed by the rules. For example, in 2016 the Baltimore Ravens had all of their offensive linemen commit holding penalties to allow the punter to keep possession of the ball so time would expire for a win, since the game can end on offensive penalties. However, the NFL changed the rules after this to prevent teams from manipulating the game clock in this way. The frequency and severity of fouls can make a large difference in the outcome of a game as well, so coaches are constantly looking for ways to minimize the number and severity of infractions committed by their players.

Often, the initial result of a play in which a foul is committed is of greater benefit to the non-offending team compared to the benefit of the penalty. For example, if the offense commits a holding foul, it would not be to the advantage of the defense to have the penalty assessed if in spite of the foul they sacked the quarterback for a twelve yard loss, especially considering the offense would have the chance to repeat the down if penalized for holding. Therefore, teams have the option of declining to have penalties assessed – when this occurs, the initial result of the play will stand. It is a common misconception that the term penalty is used to refer both to an infraction and the penal consequence of that infraction. A foul is a rule infraction (e.g. offensive holding) for which a penalty (e.g. move back 10 yards) is either assessed or declined.

== Signaling and announcing penalties ==
=== History ===
Penalties were originally signaled using whistles or horns. In 1943, college coach Dike Beede gave the first penalty flags to a 4-person crew led by Jack McPhee, who found the penalty flags clear and easy to use in noisy environments, which led to their eventual use in professional football in 1948.

=== Today ===
Officials initially signal fouls by tossing a bright yellow (American) or orange (Canadian) flag onto the field toward or at the spot of the foul. In 2021, flags in the Canadian Football League were changed to yellow. Because of this, broadcasters and fans often use the terms "flag", "flag on the play", or "flag is down" to refer to fouls during the game.

During a play, multiple officials may flag the same foul, and multiple flags may be thrown for separate fouls on the same play. If applicable, the same official can signal additional fouls on a given play by throwing a beanbag or their cap. When officials throw a flag during a down, play does not stop until the ball becomes dead under normal conditions, as if there were no fouls.

Once the ball is dead, or immediately when a foul is called after a play is over or prior to a snap (since the ball is dead anyway), the referee, the officials who threw the flags and other officials with a view of the play confer on whether the initially alleged infraction is adjudged (after deliberation and consideration of the rule(s) and the infraction) to have actually been committed, what it was, and who committed it. The final determination and assessment of the penalty is the sole responsibility of the referee. The referee then makes initial body signals to the press box indicating what fouls were committed and the team that committed them, the latter shown by extending the arm toward that team's end zone.

The referee then confers with the offended team's on-field captain to find out whether the offended team would rather decline the penalty and take the result of the play. The result of the play may be more advantageous to the offended team, especially, for example, if time is running out in the half and a 7-yard gain is a better option than a 5-yard penalty. However, the referee may not have to confer with the team captain because the choice is fairly obvious (such as when the defense commits a foul during a play in which the offense scores a touchdown). After any final conference, the referee then makes full visual signals describing the foul in detail, consisting of: the foul that was committed, the team that committed it, whether or not the opposing team chooses to decline it, the resulting down or possession, and any other penalties such as disqualification (ejection) of a player from the game or a ten-second runoff from the game clock. In college football, the NFL and other professional leagues, and in some high school games, the referee also announces the fouls and their penalties over the stadium's public address system using a wireless microphone. In college and professional football, and high school in some states, the referee will also give out the jersey numbers of the player(s) who committed the fouls (on rare occasions, the player's position is announced in lieu of the jersey number). During these announcements, the referee usually does not use names of the respective teams or their cities, but rather will use the generic terms "offense", "defense", "kicking team", "receiving team", "passing team" etc. Some officials, especially in high school and lower levels, will refer to teams by their jersey color (e.g. "white", "red", "blue", etc.). By contrast, in the Canadian Football League (CFL), they are announced by their respective city or province.

The typical announcement follows this format: [foul], [team], [number(s) of the player(s) committing the foul], [distance], [next down: replay of down, loss of down, etc.].

- NFL example: "Holding, defense number 52. Five-yard penalty, automatic first down." (Holding on defense gives an automatic first down for the offense.)
- High school example: "Pass interference, defense. Half the distance to the goal line, repeat third down." (Defensive pass interference is not an automatic first down.)
- CFL example: "Pass interference, Ottawa number 13. Ball will be placed at the spot of the foul, automatic first down." (The referee will sometimes repeat the announcement in French, depending on their fluency and the game's location.)

== General types of penalty enforcement ==
The following are general types of penalty enforcement. Specific rules will vary depending on the league, conference, and level of football.

Most penalties result in replaying the down and moving the ball toward the offending team's end zone. The distance is usually either 5, 10, or 15 yards depending on the penalty. However, such penalties, when enforced, are capped at half the distance to the offending team's goal line.

Depending on the foul, the spot where the penalty is enforced may be at the spot of the foul; the previous spot (the line of scrimmage where the down began); the spot of the snap, fumble or backwards pass; or the succeeding spot (the line of scrimmage of the next down).

Most defensive penalties give the offense an automatic first down. Even if the first down is not automatic, a penalty whose enforcement would put the offense past their line to gain results in a first down. Conversely, some offensive penalties result in loss of a down (that is, loss of the right to repeat the down).

Rules are asymmetrical in regard to whether a team can score directly as a result of a penalty. The offensive team typically cannot do so; if a foul that is penalized from the spot of the foul is called on the defense in its own end zone, the ball is placed on either the one-yard line or the two-yard line, and the offense must try to score from there. Exceptions (which are extremely rare at higher levels) can apply for egregious conduct known as palpably unfair acts, such as someone entering the field to interfere with a player running towards the end zone with the ball. On the other hand, penalties called on the offense in its own end zone can result in the defense scoring a two-point safety.

If a team commits a foul during the last play of any quarter, the other team has the option to accept the penalty and extend the quarter one more play even with the clock showing 00:00 (i.e., an untimed play).

In American football, when multiple fouls occur, enforcement depends on who committed them and when. If one team commits multiple fouls, only one of them can be enforced. If both teams commit one or more fouls during a play, or both do so after a whistle, then all fouls offset, unless one team commits a major (15-yard) penalty and the other commits a 5-yard penalty. In the latter case, the 15-yard penalty is enforced, while the 5-yard penalty is not. Penalties during a play are not offset by penalties after the whistle, or vice versa. In the CFL, the penalty yardage is generally netted: for example, a 15-yard penalty by one team and a 10-yard penalty by the other will result in 5 net yards of penalty enforcement.

The most serious fouls (for example, fighting or deliberately making contact with an official) will result in disqualification (i.e. the ejection of the player from the game) while some slightly less serious fouls (for example, unsportsmanlike conduct) can result in disqualification if committed by the same player or coach a certain number of times. Upon disqualification, the ejected player(s) must immediately leave the field of play including the bench area - typically, at any competitive level, a disqualified player is expected to return to his team's dressing room. Some fouls can lead to supplemental discipline after the game. At the professional level, even personal fouls not serious enough to warrant disqualification (including any not seen by the officials) will often result in fines. Particular attention in this regard is now taken with respect to blows to the head, due to the now-known long-term hazards concussions pose to players' health. A foul serious enough to warrant disqualification may result in a suspension for one or more games. This is especially true for fouls committed after the end of the game, since the usual penalties cannot be enforced then, or close to the end of the game especially if the winner is no longer in doubt.

Unlike in some sports, except when they are disqualified, players who commit fouls are not required to leave the field and may take part in the next play, other than in rare cases such as equipment violations where the player must return to the bench and remain there until the violation is corrected. Also, unlike in most other codes of football, there is no circumstance in which a gridiron team can be compelled to play with less than the regulation number of players on the field (eleven in American football and twelve in Canadian football) for any amount of time due to foul play. Even in the case of ejection(s), the disqualified player(s) may immediately be replaced for the next play.

== Intentional fouls ==
In certain situations, a team (specifically in the NFL) may intentionally commit a foul to receive a penalty that they see as advantageous. In general, the NFL—and other sanctioning bodies—do not permit intentional fouling in most circumstances and have taken efforts to close loopholes and negate any advantage that may have come from such a foul.

- Defensive pass interference may be committed in or near the end zone toward the end of a game to prevent a touchdown. This would place the ball at or near the goal line with a first down. The unfair act clause allows for a touchdown to be awarded in such situations and is explicitly recommended when such fouls are repeated.
- Since a penalty will stop the clock, a team may commit a foul late in a game to stop the clock, particularly if they have no timeouts remaining. Some leagues have instituted a 10-second runoff to offset any advantage gained from this. (See below)
- Deliberately injuring a dominant player to prevent them from playing. Even if the offending player is ejected from the game, fined or otherwise punished, if the offending player is of lower caliber than the player who was attacked, the opposing team will be irreparably harmed. The New Orleans Saints allegedly used this tactic on its way to winning Super Bowl XLIV, which was never revoked.
- In the waning minutes of a game, committing a foul such as holding results in the down being replayed, and while the clock stops after the play, the time that elapsed during the play still came off the clock, thus allowing teams to gain extra downs to run out the clock by fouling. The NFL closed this loophole in 2017, declaring this strategy to be unsportsmanlike conduct and resetting the clock to where it stood before the play.

There is one situation in which intentional fouling is generally tolerated: in the event that a team is on its fourth down and within the four-down territory—outside of field goal range but unlikely to gain meaningful yardage for a punt—the offense may take a five-yard dead ball foul such as delay of game or false start to back the offense up five yards and give the punter more space to land a punt within the red zone. The United Football League imposed a rule against this strategy by prohibiting punting at any time in a drive after an offensive team crosses midfield.

== The ten-second runoff rule ==
In the NFL and NCAA, a 10-second runoff is assessed if any of the following acts are committed in the last minute of either half/overtime (as of 2017, after the two-minute warning in the NFL):

1. A foul by either team that prevents the ball from being snapped
2. Intentional grounding
3. Illegal forward pass beyond the line of scrimmage
4. Throwing a backwards pass out of bounds
5. Any other intentional act by the offense that causes the clock to stop

The 10-second penalty does not apply if:

1. The clock is stopped when the ball is set for play and will not start until the ball is snapped.
2. If the team committing the foul has timeouts and elects to use one in lieu of the runoff.
3. If the offended team declines the runoff (which prevents the offense from committing fouls to intentionally run out the clock). They may elect to decline the runoff while accepting the yardage penalty but may not do the reverse.

Moreover, the game clock will run once the ball is placed. If such a runoff occurs with 10 seconds or less remaining, the half/overtime automatically ends. Since the enforcement of the 10-second runoff, eight regular season NFL games have had a half end automatically due to this rule. Notable examples include: 2011 Chicago–Oakland game ended after Caleb Hanie was charged for intentional grounding penalty near the end of the game; a 2012 New England–Seattle game in which the first half ended after Tom Brady was charged with the same penalty Hanie suffered the year before, costing New England a field goal chance in a game they later lost by only 1 point; a 2014 St. Louis–Tampa Bay game in which Tampa Bay lost a chance to attempt a game-winning field goal due to Mike Evans suffering an injury with no timeouts left; a 2015 New England–New York Jets game in which New York lost an attempt to throw a Hail Mary pass to tie or win the game because Brandon Marshall was assessed a false start penalty with 1 second left in the game; and a 2017 Atlanta–Detroit game in which Detroit fell short of a game-winning touchdown due to a reversal via a replay that stopped the clock with 8 seconds remaining. A pre-season game in 2006 between Houston and Kansas City had the first half end automatically due to an intentional grounding foul with less than 10 seconds left. More importantly, a 2013 divisional playoff game between the New Orleans Saints and the Seattle Seahawks also ended on a 10-second runoff after Saints wide receiver Marques Colston threw an illegal forward pass.

Starting in 2011, the NCAA adopted a similar 10-second penalty rule for college football. Like the NFL rule, it applies in the last minute of each half, but the NCAA rule differs in that it applies to fouls by either side that cause a clock stoppage. Like the NFL rule, the team that benefits from the penalty may elect to take both the yardage and the runoff, the yardage alone, or neither (but not the runoff in lieu of yards). The penalized team may elect to take a charged timeout in order to avoid the runoff.

The NCAA rule was passed in response to the end of the 4th quarter in the 2010 Music City Bowl. In that game, the North Carolina Tar Heels were down 20–17 at the end of the 4th quarter, and because they had no timeouts, they spiked the ball to stop the clock with 1 second left while too many men were on the field due to confusion about whether the field goal unit needed to come on the field. Because college football did not yet have the 10-second runoff, UNC was penalized 5 yards but was still able to kick the field goal to send the game to overtime, since the foul caused the clock to stop with time remaining. UNC won the game.

In both the NFL and NCAA, a 10-second runoff is assessed if the game is stopped in the final two minutes of either half/overtime for an instant replay review, and the review determines the clock would not have stopped otherwise. This provision was used near the end of regulation in the 2018 LSU vs. Texas A&M game. An interception by LSU's Grant Delpit was overruled when it was determined Texas A&M quarterback Kellen Mond retrieved a bad snap with his right knee on the ground, ending the play. After the ball was re-spotted and the clock reset, 10 seconds were deducted and the clock restarted on the ready-for-play signal. In this situation, either team may call a time-out to prevent the runoff that neither team can decline.

== List of penalties ==
In the NFL, most defensive penalties result in an automatic first down: the offense is given a first down regardless of how many yards they have moved since their last first down, including the penalty. The exceptions are offside, encroachment, neutral zone infraction, delay of game, illegal substitution, calling excess timeouts, running into a kicker, and having more than 11 men on the field. In these cases, the appropriate yardage penalty is assessed, and a first down is given only if the net yardage by the offense since the last first down, including the penalty, is at least ten yards; if not, there is a repeat of down.

Foul	Description	Signal	Penalty yardage			
Foul	Description	Signal	NFL	NCAA	HS	CFL
Blocking below the waist	An illegal block, from any direction, below the waist by any defensive player or by an offensive player under certain situations, by any player after change of possession, by any player in high school with certain exceptions. Sometimes incorrectly referred to as a "chop block".	(American) Both hands brought down, wrists turned inward, in a chopping motion across the front of the thighs (Canadian) Same as unnecessary roughness; it is a subset of that penalty	15 yards; automatic first down if committed by the defense	15 yards; automatic first down if committed by the defense	15 yards	15 yards; automatic first down if committed by the defense
Block in the back (offense, defense, or special teams)	A blocker contacting a non-ballcarrying member of the opposing team from behind and above the waist. Called an "illegal block" in the CFL.	One arm extended horizontally in front of the body, palm facing outward. The other hand grasps the first hand's wrist and pushes outward	10 yards	10 yards	10 yards	10 yards
Chop block ("high-low" block; offense)	An offensive player tries to cut block a defensive player that is already being blocked by another offensive player. The second block may need to be below the thigh or knee, depending on the code.	(American) The signal for a personal foul (except in high school), followed by: Arms extended alongside the body, palms facing outward, then moving in to the upper thigh in a chopping motion. (Canadian) Both hands held out flat, facing each other, in front of the referee, moving down together diagonally roughly from one shoulder to the opposite hip.	15 yards (if it is in the end zone the play will be ruled a safety); automatic first down if committed by defense (penalty also counts regardless of how many yards the offense gained).	15 yards; automatic first down if committed by defense (penalty also counts regardless of how many yards the offense gained).	15 yards	15 yards; automatic first down if committed by defense
Clipping (offense, defense, or special teams; also known as a "crackback")	A blocker contacting a non-ballcarrying opponent from behind and at or below the waist	The signal for a personal foul (except in high school), followed by: Chopping the back of one thigh with the hand.	15 yards; automatic first down if committed by defense	15 yards; automatic first down if committed by defense	15 yards	15 yards; automatic first down if committed by defense
Contacting the kicker	Any contact with the kicker when in the act of kicking, unless the ball has touched the ground (as in a bad snap), the defender touches the ball, contact by a blocker causes the contact, or the contact is slight or incidental.	Touching a raised leg below the knee	See roughing the kicker or running into the kicker	See roughing the kicker or running into the kicker	See roughing the kicker or running into the kicker	10 yards
Delay of game (offense, defense, or special teams)	Any action which delays the next play. In American football, on offense, this includes failing to snap the ball before the play clock reaches zero. (In the CFL, that action is a time count violation.) It may also include spiking the ball. On defense, it occurs when a player hinders the offense in hurrying to make the next snap. This happens most often in the last two minutes of a half when the offense is trying to go down the field in a hurry. The defense can also be flagged for a delay of game if a player spikes the ball after the end of a play. On special teams, it happens when the return team runs after signaling for a fair catch, or the defense does not unpile in a timely manner after the play ends.	(American) Upper arms extended out from the body, forearms bent toward the opposite arm, such that the arms lie on top of one another or that each arm touches the opposite shoulder. (Canadian) Both hands behind the back, resting roughly at the waist, so that the elbows extend out from the side of the body	5 yards	5 yards	5 yards	10 yards
Encroachment (offense or defense)	Before the snap, a defensive player illegally crosses the line of scrimmage and makes contact with an opponent or has a clear path to the quarterback. In NCAA, this includes an offensive player being in or beyond the neutral zone after the snapper has put his hands on the ball. In high school, this includes any crossing of the neutral zone by either team, whether contact is made or not. The play is not allowed to begin. In the CFL, this is also called "offside".	Two hands placed on the hips	5 yards	5 yards	5 yards	5 yards
Equipment violation	Any player in the game without necessary safety equipment (mouthpiece, pads), without chin straps properly fastened or in violation of certain clothing rules (e.g. sock requirements in college).	(American) One hand placed on the back of the head	—	Timeout charged against the offending player's team	Timeout charged against the offending player's team, or if the team is out of timeouts, the player is removed from the game for one play or until the equipment is fixed	10 yards and removal of the player from the game for three downs. If the equipment is deemed hazardous, 15 yards and disqualification.
Face mask (offense, defense, or special teams)	Grasping the face mask of another player while attempting to block or tackle him. In the NFL, the grasping and pulling/twisting must be intentional to be penalized. Under NCAA rules, it is a foul to grasp and twist the face mask. Under high school rules, any grasping of the face mask, any helmet opening, or the chin strap is a foul, though grasping and twisting carries a more severe penalty than "incidental" grasping without any twisting.	The signal for a personal foul (except for incidental grasping in high school), followed by: One arm in front of the body, forearm extended vertically. The hand is closed into a fist in front of the face and pulled downward	15 yards; automatic first down if committed by defense	15 yards; automatic first down if committed by defense	15 yards for grasping and twisting, 5 yards for incidental grasping	15 yards; automatic first down if committed by defense
False start (offense)	An offensive player illegally moves after lining up for—but prior to—the snap. Since the ball is dead, the down does not begin. Any player who moves after he has gotten in his set position before the snap in a way that simulates the start of the play. Called "[illegal] procedure" in the CFL.	Two arms in front of chest horizontally with closed fists "rolling" around each other (same signal that basketball referees use to signal traveling).	5 yards	5 yards	5 yards	5 yards
Helmet-to-helmet collision (offense or defense)	The act of banging one's helmet into the helmet of another player.		see Targeting, below	see Targeting, below	15 yards	see Unnecessary roughness, below
Helping the runner	When a member of the offensive or receiving team pushes, pulls, grasps or lifts a person in possession of the ball. Also known as "assisting the runner," the penalty is extremely rare, having last been called at the NFL level in 1991.	Arms at sides, the forearms are pulled upward perpendicular to the torso.	10 yards	5 yards	5 yards	—
Holding (offense or defense)	Illegally grasping or pulling an opponent other than the ball carrier while attempting to ward off a block or cover a receiver. One of the most commonly called penalties. If a penalty for holding that occurred in the offense's end zone is accepted, a safety results.	Raising one arm in front of the body (forearm is roughly vertical with elbow at bottom) and grabbing its wrist with the opposite hand	Offense, 10 yards. If it is called in the end zone by the offense, it's an automatic safety; defense, 5 yards and automatic first down.	10 yards	10 yards	10 yards
Horse-collar tackle	Illegally tackling another player by grabbing the inside of the ball carrier's shoulder pads or jersey from behind and yanking the player down.	(American) The signal for a personal foul (except in high school), followed by: Raising one arm to the side of the body with the elbow bent, so that the closed fist is near the neck. The fist is then pulled away, horizontally, from the neck. (Canadian) Same as unnecessary roughness; it is a subset of that penalty	15 yards, automatic first down if committed by defense (penalty also counts regardless of how many yards the offense gained).	15 yards, automatic first down if committed by defense (penalty also counts regardless of how many yards the offense gained).	15 yards	15 yards
Illegal batting (offense)	Any intentional batting of a loose ball or ball in player possession. Batting is legal in certain limited situations, such as blocking a kick or deflecting a forward pass (any eligible player may bat a forward pass in any direction).	(NFL) Both arms extended the side, with the fingertips brought up to the shoulder of the respective arms. (NCAA/HS) One arm extended the side, with the fingertips brought up to the shoulder of the same arm.	10 yards	10 yards	15 yards	see Offside pass, below
Illegal contact (defense)	Making significant contact with a receiver after the receiver has advanced five yards beyond the line of scrimmage. The illegal contact is called only if the quarterback is still in pocket and the ball is still in his hands. This rule was adopted in 1978, and its enactment is regarded as contributing to the increase in passing efficiency the NFL has witnessed since that time.	One arm in front of the body with palm out and fingers up, moved in a pushing motion out	5 yards and an automatic first down	Does not exist	Does not exist	10 yards
Illegal fair catch signal (receiving team)	A receiver for a punt or kick return signals a "fair catch" by waving his hand in the air before catching the ball, and running after the catch was made. The return is neutralized, and the penalty is deducted from where the receiver caught the ball.	Arm raised in the air, before waving it and dropping it back down, similar to the fair catch signal	5 yards, enforced where receiver catches the ball	5 yards, enforced where receiver catches the ball	5 yards, enforced where receiver catches the ball	5 yards, enforced where receiver catches the ball
Illegal formation	Fewer than seven players line up on the line of scrimmage (NFL/CFL); more than four players in the backfield (NCAA/HS); eligible receivers fail to line up as the leftmost and rightmost players on the line (NFL/CFL); or when five properly numbered ineligible players fail to line up on the line. Can also be called on the defense/receiving team in the NFL on field goal attempts if they have more than six players on the line on either side of the snapper. Announced as "[illegal] procedure" or "procedure, no end" in the CFL.	Two arms in front of chest with closed fists "rolling" around each other (same signal that basketball referees use to signal traveling)	5 yards	5 yards	5 yards	5 yards
Illegal forward pass (offense)	A forward pass is thrown from past the line of scrimmage. Also, a second forward pass is thrown on the same play or a forward pass is thrown after change of possession (American; those are treated as offside passes in the CFL).	(American) One hand, flat, waved behind the small of the back (Canadian) One arm in front of chest, palm open and down, with the elbow out to the side, moved away from chest	5 yards from the spot of the foul and loss of down	5 yards from the spot of the foul and loss of down	5 yards from the spot of the foul and loss of down	10 yards from the spot of the foul (the down is repeated)
Illegal hands to the face	Pushing or hitting a player on offense in the head or helmet	(NFL/NCAA) One open fist in a pushing motion to the referee's chin; (HS) Same signal as holding	10 yards if committed by offense; 5 yards and automatic first down if committed by defense	15 yards (personal foul); automatic first down if committed by defense (penalty also counts regardless of how many yards the offense gained).	10 yards	—
Illegal kick	Any ball not kicked in accordance with the rules, for instance: When an attempted drop kick bounces more than once before being kicked; When a player kicks the ball after a turnover or receiving an opponent's kick (the "return kick"); When a player kicks the ball after having advanced the ball past the line of scrimmage; All of the above kicks are legal in Canadian football.	Right arm is curled so that the hand touches the shoulder.	15 yards	10 yards	15 yards	—
Illegal kickoff (special teams)	The ball, after a kickoff, heads out of bounds between both goal lines without touching any player on either team.	Two arms in front of chest with closed fists "rolling" around each other (same signal that basketball referees use to signal traveling). (Canadian) Same signal, plus a swinging motion of the leg to simulate a kick	Receiving team awarded possession 25 yards from spot of kickoff, or at spot out of bounds, whichever is more advantageous.	Five yards from the previous spot (with the kick retaken); or five yards from the spot where the subsequent dead ball belongs to the receiving team; or the receiving team may put the ball in play 30 yards beyond the kicking team's restraining line.	Five yards from the previous spot (with the kick retaken); or five yards from the spot where the subsequent dead ball belongs to the receiving team; or the receiving team may put the ball in play 30 yards beyond the kicking team's restraining line.	Five yards from the previous spot (with the kick retaken); or the spot where the subsequent dead ball belongs to the receiving team; or the receiving team may put the ball in play 35 yards from the spot of kickoff.
Illegal motion (offense)	A player in motion is moving forward at the time of the snap.	One arm in front of chest, palm open and down, with the elbow out to the side, moved away from chest.	5 yards	5 yards	5 yards	Not a foul
Illegal participation/Too many players	Twelve (CFL: 13) or more players participate during the play, because the extra players either are not detected before the snap or enter during the play. Once the down begins, no further players may enter the field and participate, even if there are fewer than 11 (CFL: 12) players. Illegal participation is also called when an offensive player goes out of bounds (unless forced out by contact by the defense) and returns during the play.	Two hands, palms down, touching the top of the head, with an elbow out to each side	5 yards	5 yards	15 yards	10 yards
Illegal shift	A player is not in motion but is not set before the snap; more than one player is in motion at the snap; or after more than one player was moving (shifting), all eleven players have not been motionless for one second.	Two arms in front of chest, palms open and down, with the elbows out to the side, moved away from chest	5 yards	5 yards	5 yards	Not a foul
Illegal substitution/Substitution infraction/Too many players in the formation	The offense has 12 (CFL: 13) or more players in the huddle for a period of 3–5 seconds; or twelve or more players are in the formation before a play; or a player is attempting to leave the field as the ball is snapped; or an offensive player entering the field fails to step at least nine yards from the sideline (inside the field's yardage numbers) before the snap; or a player who has been suspended or disqualified attempts to enter the field of play.	(NCAA/High School) Arm along the side of the body with the palm of the hand touching the opposite shoulder; (NFL/CFL) two hands, palms down, touching the top of the head, with an elbow out to each side	5 yards	5 yards	5 yards	5 yards
Illegal touching of a forward pass (offense)	A forward pass first touches an ineligible receiver (e.g., an offensive lineman). If the ball is touched by the defenders first, any player may touch it.	One hand held up to shoulder, fingertips touching the shoulder; (NFL) two hands held up to shoulders, fingertips touching the shoulders; (CFL) both arms extended sideways	5 yards (if touched by an originally ineligible receiver) / loss of down (if touched by an originally eligible receiver who voluntarily or involuntarily went out of bounds)	5 yards (if touched by an originally ineligible receiver) / 5 yards and loss of down (if touched by an originally eligible receiver who voluntarily went out of bounds)	5 yards and a loss of down	10 yards
Illegal touching of a free kick (special teams)	The ball, after the free kick, first touches a member of the kicking team prior to travelling 10 yards. This is most often seen on an onside kick where a member of the kicking team prematurely comes in contact with the ball in an attempt to recover it. Like illegal touching of a forward pass, if a defender (member of the receiving team) first touches the ball, any player may touch it. Note: in NFHS it is called 'first touching', not 'illegal touching'. It is also illegal touching for a kicking team player to touch a free kick after going out of bounds, unless the kick is touched by the receiving team.	One hand held up to shoulder, fingertips touching the shoulder; (NFL) two hands held up to shoulders, fingertips touching the shoulders.	5 yards, unless the illegal touching occurs inside the receiving team's 5 yard line. In that case, it is ruled a touchback.	Five yards from the previous spot, or five yards from the spot where the subsequent dead ball belongs to the receiving team, or from the spot where the ball is placed after a touchback.	Not a foul. Receiving team may take possession at the spot of touching unless it commits a foul.	—
Illegal touching of a scrimmage kick (special teams)	The ball, during the scrimmage kick, is touched by a kicking team player, unless the kick is touched by the receiving team or another member of the kicking team.	One hand held up to shoulder, fingertips touching the shoulder (NFL); two hands held up to shoulders, fingertips touching the shoulders (NCAA).	—	Not a foul. Receiving team has the option of taking possession at the spot of illegal touching unless it commits a foul.	Not a foul (called "first touching" in the NFHS rulebook). Receiving team may take possession at the spot of first touching unless it commits a foul.	see No yards
Illegal use of hands	Illegal use of the hands against a player on offense while attempting to ward off a block, cover a receiver, or tackle a ball carrier. There are several restrictions on how a defender may initiate contact.	One forearm vertically held in front of the body with an open fist facing away from the referee's chest (closed fist for a HS referee); the other hand grasping the first arm's wrist	10 yards if committed by offense; 5 yards and automatic first down if committed by defense	10 yards, automatic first if committed by defense against an eligible receiver	10 yards	—
Ineligible receiver downfield (offense)	An ineligible receiver is past the line of scrimmage prior to a forward pass. Ineligible receivers must wait until the pass is thrown beyond the line of scrimmage (or touched) before moving past the line of scrimmage. This exception has been added to accommodate the screen pass, where a receiver (most often a back, but sometimes a tight end or wide receiver) catches a ball behind the line of scrimmage behind a "screen" of offensive linemen.	One palm touching the top of the head with the elbow out to the side.	5 yards	5 yards	5 yards	—
Intentional grounding (offense)	A forward pass is thrown intentionally incomplete so that the passer avoids loss of yardage or to conserve time. Not assessed if the ball is spiked. If the quarterback has moved outside of the area between his offensive tackles (the tackle box or more commonly called "the pocket"), there is no foul for grounding the ball if the quarterback throws the ball past the line of scrimmage.	Both hands held out flat, facing each other, in front of the referee, moving down together diagonally roughly from one shoulder to the opposite hip.	10 yards or spot of foul, whichever is farther from the original line of scrimmage, and loss of down. If the foul occurs in the end zone, the play is ruled a safety.	Spot of foul and loss of down (safety if the foul occurs in the end zone).	5 yards from the spot of the foul and loss of down (safety if the foul occurs in the end zone).	—
Leaping (defense)	A defender at least one yard in front of the line of scrimmage running forward and leaping in an attempt to block a field goal or a point-after try lands on other players on either team. The penalty is not called if the defender was within one yard of the line of scrimmage at the time of the snap.	(NCAA) Same as Personal foul, it is a subset of that penalty.(NFL) Same as Unsportsmanlike conduct, it is a subset of that penalty	15 yard penalty; automatic first down if committed by defense (penalty also counts regardless of how many yards the offense gained).	15 yard penalty; automatic first down if committed by defense (penalty also counts regardless of how many yards the offense gained).	—	—
Leverage (defense)	A defensive player jumping or standing on a teammate or an opponent to block or attempt to block an opponent's kick.	(NCAA/NFL) Same as Unsportsmanlike conduct, it is a subset of that penalty	15 yard penalty and automatic first down	15 yards	—	—
Major foul (Canadian)	—	—	—	—	—	See personal foul, the equivalent foul in American football
Neutral Zone Infraction (defense)	Before the snap, a defensive player (most often a lineman) jumps into the neutral zone and "startles" an offensive player, causing him to false start.	Same as encroachment/offside	5 yards	5 yards	5 yards	—
No yards (special teams) (Canadian)	During a scrimmage kick, a member of the kicking team, other than the kicker or a player even with or behind the kicker at the time of the kick, is the first to touch a kicked ball or is within a five-yard radius of the receiving player who is first to touch the ball.	Upper arms extended out from the body, forearms bent toward the opposite arm, such that the arms lie on top of one another or that each arm touches the opposite elbow.	see Kick catching interference or Illegal touching of a scrimmage kick	see Kick catching interference or Illegal touching of a scrimmage kick	see Kick catching interference or Illegal touching of a scrimmage kick	15 yards; 5 yards, for violation of the five-yard radius after a kick has touched the ground and bounced back toward the spot of the kick
Objectionable conduct (Canadian)	—	—	—	—	—	See unsportsmanlike conduct, the equivalent foul in American football
Offside	A player is on the wrong side of the line of scrimmage (or in the neutral zone) when the ball is snapped. This foul occurs simultaneously with the snap. Unlike offensive players, defensive players are not compelled to come to a set position before the snap. If a defender jumps across the line but gets back to his side before the snap, there is no foul. In the case of an offside foul, play is not stopped, and the foul is announced at the conclusion of the play. Media covering the games call it a "free play" for the offense, as the non-offending team may decline the penalty and take the yardage gained on the play (and when the play works against them, like a turnover to the opposing team, the non-offending team can accept the penalty and retake possession of the ball) - unlike in the case of a false start foul against the offense, whereupon the play is immediately stopped by the officials. This foul is almost always committed by the defense (any offensive player that moves into the neutral zone after setting would be charged with a false start). In NCAA and NFL, a player of the kicking team on a free kick is offside if he is in front of the ball at the time of the kick. However, it is possible for the offense to commit this foul. In the NFL, if an offensive player lines up in the neutral zone, an offside foul will be called against the offense. In the CFL, if an offensive player is beyond the line of scrimmage at the snap, an offside foul will be called against the offense.	Two hands placed on the hips	5 yards	5 yards	Not applicable (see Encroachment)	5 yards
Offside pass	Any act to direct the ball forward (toward the opponent's dead/end line) other than a kick or a forward pass. This includes batting the ball and forward passes after change of possession.	One arm in front of chest, palm open and down, with the elbow out to the side, moved away from chest	see Illegal batting or Illegal forward pass, above	see Illegal batting or Illegal forward pass, above	see Illegal batting or Illegal forward pass, above	No yardage penalty; the down counts, and the ball is next snapped where the pass originated
Pass interference (offense or defense)	Making physical contact with an intended receiver (intentional physical contact in NFL), after the ball has been thrown and before it has been touched by another player, in order to hinder or prevent him from catching a forward pass. (On offense, the restriction begins at the snap and continues until the ball is touched in order to prevent receivers from blocking defenders away from a passed ball.)	Both arms extended in front of the body, palms upright, in a pushing motion	Offense, 10 yards; defense, spot of foul (or placement on the 1 yard line if the foul occurs in the end zone) and automatic first down	Offense, 10 yards; defense, lesser of 15 yards or the spot of the foul (or placement on the 2 yard line if the foul occurs in the end zone) and automatic first down	15 yards, regardless of whether or not the foul is in the end zone. Beginning with the 2013 season, the down is replayed, unless the ball is beyond the line to gain after enforcement; the penalty no longer includes an automatic first down (defensive interference) or loss of down (offensive).	Offense: 10 yards; Defense: spot of foul (or placement on the 1 yard line if the foul occurs in the end zone) and automatic first down, or 10 yards and automatic first down if judged accidental
Personal foul (offense or defense) (Major foul in Canadian football)	A conduct- or safety-related infraction. Includes unnecessary roughness, such as hitting a ball carrier after he is already out of bounds, "piling on" a ball carrier who is already down, or violent contact with an opponent who is away from and out of the play. In American football, if the officials decide that the action was particularly flagrant, the player in question can be ejected from the game. (In Canadian football, such a flagrant act is a rough play foul.) The CFL also has a "Grade 2 Unnecessary Roughness" foul for direct contact to a passer's head or neck area or spearing to an opponent's head or neck.	One arm extended from the body and bent at the elbow; the forearm is tilted at an angle, so the wrist is roughly in front of the collarbone but at a distance from the body. The other arm is brought down in a chopping motion, striking the first arm wrist-to-wrist. (Canadian) One arm extended to the side of the body in a pumping motion	15 yards; automatic first down if committed by defense (penalty also counts regardless of how many yards the offense gained).	15 yards; automatic first down if committed by defense (penalty also counts regardless of how many yards the offense gained).	15 yards	15 yards; automatic first down if committed by defense (penalty also counts regardless of how many yards the offense gained). For Grade 2 Unnecessary Roughness: as described above but 25 yards instead of 15, and the offender is disqualified for a second such foul.
Punt out of bounds in flight (special teams)	A scrimmage kick goes out of bounds in flight untouched by the receiving team between the 20 yard lines.	Two arms in front of chest with closed fists "rolling" around each other, plus a swinging motion of the leg to simulate a kick	Not a foul	Not a foul	Not a foul	10 yards from either the previous line of scrimmage with the down replayed or from the point the ball went out of bounds with the receiving team taking possession.
Rough play	A flagrant conduct- or safety infraction. Includes fighting, punching, and intentional contact with an official.	One arm extended from the body and bent at the elbow; the forearm is tilted downward, so that the wrist is roughly in front of the waist but at a distance from the body. The other arm is brought down in a chopping motion, striking the first arm wrist-to-wrist.	Not applicable (see Personal foul)	Not applicable (see Personal foul)	Not applicable (see Personal foul)	25 yards and disqualification of the offender; automatic first down if committed by defense (penalty also counts regardless of how many yards the offense gained).
Roughing the passer (defense)	A defender continues an effort to tackle or "hit" a passer after the passer has already thrown a pass. (In the NFL, a defender is allowed to take one step after the ball is thrown; a defender is penalized if he hits the passer having taken two or more steps after the ball leaves the passer's hand, or if the passer is hit above the shoulders, or if the passer is targeted using the crown of the helmet.)	The signal for a personal foul (except in high school), followed by: Open-fist arm extended above same-side shoulder, brought diagonally downward towards the opposite side waist.	15 yards and an automatic first down (penalty also counts regardless of how many yards the offense gained).	15 yards and an automatic first down (penalty may be enforced from the end of the run if the pass is completed; otherwise, penalty is enforced from the previous spot).	15 yards and an automatic first down (penalty may be enforced from the end of the run if the pass is completed; otherwise, penalty is enforced from the previous spot).	15 yards and an automatic first down (penalty also counts regardless of how many yards the offense gained). Penalty upgraded to 25 yards if the contact is a direct blow to the passer's head or neck.
Roughing the kicker (special teams)	A defender, having missed an attempt to block a kick, tackles the kicker or otherwise runs into the kicker in a way that might injure the kicker or his vulnerable extended kicking leg. This protection is also extended to the holder of a place kick. In the CFL, the standard is unnecessary roughness against the punter, kicker, or holder.	The signal for a personal foul (American) or major foul (CFL), followed by: Leg moved in a kicking motion.	15 yards and an automatic first down if committed by defense	15 yards and an automatic first down if committed by defense	15 yards and an automatic first down	15 yards and an automatic first down
Roughing the snapper (special teams)	On a punt or field goal attempt, the long snapper is allowed to regain his balance and assume a protective position before he is contacted by the defense.	—	15 yards and an automatic first down	15 yards and an automatic first down	15 yards and an automatic first down	—
Running into the kicker (special teams)	On a kicking play where the defense fails to touch ("block") the kicked ball, the defense runs into the kicker/punter. If such an act occurs but is not intentional, this foul is assessed. If intentional, the personal foul of roughing the kicker is assessed instead (see above).	Extending one leg, straight, up to about a 20 degree angle in front of the body.	5 yards	5 yards	5 yards	10 yards (see contacting the kicker)
Sideline infraction	A player is outside of the team box, a coach is outside the coaches' box (along the sideline in front of the team box), or too many coaches are in the coaches' box. (In high school, the penalty for a coach on the field of play is unsportsmanlike conduct, not a sideline infraction.)	Arms bent and extended to both sides, hands waved forward and backward in a pushing motion. Interference (NFHS): Both hands placed behind the back.	N/A	5 yards (first infraction); 15 yards (subsequent infractions, also unsportsmanlike conduct)	No yardage (first infraction—warning); 5 yards (second infraction—interference); 15 yards (subsequent infractions—unsportsmanlike conduct, interference)	—
Spearing (offense or defense)	Tackling or otherwise contacting an opponent with one's helmet. (This technique is illegal because of the risk of neck injuries to the tackler.)	The signal for a personal foul (except in high school), followed by: Arm extended, bent at the elbow, touching the side of his head with a closed fist	15 yards; automatic first down if committed by defense. Penalty also counts regardless of how many yards the offense gained. (Starting from 2017 season, this foul is no longer referred to as spearing in the NFL rulebook, but as "targeting with the crown of the helmet".)	15 yards; automatic first down if committed by defense (this foul is no longer referred to as spearing in the NCAA rulebook, but as "targeting with the crown of the helmet")	15 yards	15 yards; 25 yards if the contact is with the opponent's head or neck
Targeting	A defensive player tackles with the crown of his helmet, by initiating contact to the opponent's head above the player's neck, or makes helmet-to-helmet collision. Under NFL and NCAA rules, also applies when an offensive player initiates the same types of contact.	The signal for a personal foul (except in high school), followed by: One arm bent to form a triangle, fist pointing at head.	15 yards; automatic first down if committed by defense. Possible ejection if ruled to be flagrant. Penalty also counts regardless of how many yards the offense gained.	15 yards, plus automatic ejection; if enforced in second half, player is also suspended for the first half of his team's next game. Automatic first down if committed by defense. Penalty can only be enforced if confirmed by video review, which is mandatory after call is announced.	15 yards	—
Time count violation	On offense, failing to snap the ball before the play clock reaches zero	One arm extended out nearly horizontally and moved in a circular motion	see Delay of game above	see Delay of game above	see Delay of game above	Before the three-minute warning in either half, or during convert attempts at any time: 5 yards After the three-minute warning and on first or second down: loss of down After the three-minute warning and on third down: 10 yards, or loss of possession if judged intentional by the referee
Too many men	—	—	—	—	—	See Illegal participation, the equivalent foul in American football
Too many men in formation	—	—	—	—	—	See Illegal substitution, the equivalent foul in American football
Tripping	A player trips another player with the lower leg.	The signal for a personal foul (except in high school) followed by: One foot kicks the ankle of the other leg from behind	15 yards, automatic first down if committed by defense.	15 yards, automatic first down, and possible disqualification if committed by defense.	15 yards	—
Unfair act	Any illegal action in which the penalty is insufficient to offset the result of the act. The NFL rule (known as a palpably unfair act) also requires that the opposing team would have scored had the illegal act not happened, which is not required at the college or high school levels. In high school only, committing repeated fouls that halve the distance to the goal is explicitly defined as an unfair act.	—	Yardage or score at discretion of referee, possible disqualification. In the case of an extraordinarily unfair act, the NFL Commissioner has the sole authority to conduct an investigation and take appropriate disciplinary and/or corrective measures. The latter include monetary fines, draft-choice forfeitures, suspension, re-playing the game, and reversal of the game result.	Any penalty at discretion of referee, up to and including forfeiture of the game.	Any penalty at discretion of referee, up to and including forfeiture of the game.	—
Unsportsmanlike conduct (Objectionable conduct in Canadian football)	Any person (usually a player but occasionally a coach and very rarely one or more spectators) acts or speaks in a manner deemed to be intentionally harmful or especially objectionable by the game officials, or by rule. Unsportsmanlike conduct is a non-contact foul; if contact is involved it becomes a personal foul. Examples include verbal abuse of officials, and taunting, which, since 2004 in the NFL, has included any "prolonged and premeditated celebrations" by players (prior to that year the latter carried only a 5-yard penalty). Later rules included using the football or end zone pylon in a touchdown celebration. If the officials decide that the action was particularly flagrant, the player, coach or spectator in question may be ejected from the game. In high school, if a single player, coach or spectator commits two unsportsmanlike conduct fouls, the person in question should automatically be ejected, a rule adopted by the NFL in 2016.	(American) Both arms extended to the sides perpendicular to the body with open fists, palms down. (Canadian) One hand placed behind the back at the waist.	15 yards, automatic first down if committed by defense (penalty also counts regardless of how many yards the offense gained). Two fouls for taunting, abusive language, or attacking players without making contact result in disqualification; fouls in those categories still count toward disqualification even if declined.	15 yards, automatic first down if committed by defense (penalty also counts regardless of how many yards the offense gained). As of 2011, if the foul was committed (1) during a play that ended in a touchdown, (2) before the ball crossed the goal line, and (3) by the team that scored, the touchdown is nullified, and the penalty is assessed from the spot of the foul.	15 yards	10 yards

== See also ==
- 1941 Oklahoma City vs. Youngstown football game, first use of the penalty flag
