= Oakland Banshees =

American women's football team

- Founded: 2001
- League: Independent Women's Football League
- Team history: WAFL (2001); WAFC (2002); IWFL (2003-present)
- Based in: Hayward, California
- Stadium: Chabot College
- Colors: Silver & Black
- Owner: Kisha Frady
- Head coach: Tony Macon
- Championships: 0

The Oakland Banshees are a women's semi-professional American football team based in Oakland, California. A member of the Independent Women's Football League, the Banshees play their home games at Chabot College in nearby Hayward.

== Season-by-season ==
Season records
| Season | W | L | T | Finish | Playoff results |
|---|---|---|---|---|---|
Oakland Banshees (WAFL)
| 2001 | 2 | 6 | 0 | 2nd Pacific Central Division | -- |
Oakland Banshees (WAFC)
| 2002 | 4 | 4 | 0 | 4th League | Lost WAFC Semifinal (Sacramento) |
Oakland Banshees (IWFL)
| 2003 | 4 | 4 | 0 | 2nd West Pacific SouthWest | -- |
| 2004 | 8 | 0 | 0 | 1st West Pacific SouthWest | Lost Western Conference Semifinal (Corvallis) |
| 2005 | 5 | 4 | 1 | 4th West Pacific Southwest | -- |
| 2006 | 0 | 2 | 0 | X-Team | -- |
| 2007 | Did not play | | | | |
| 2008 | 0 | 4 | 0 | X-Team | -- |
| 2009 | -- | -- | -- | -- | -- |
| Totals | 23 | 25 | 0 | (including playoffs) | |

== 2009 season schedule ==
| Date | Opponent | Home/Away | Result |
|---|---|---|---|
| April 11 | Sacramento Sirens | Home | |
| April 18 | California Quake | Home | |
| May 2 | Portland Shockwave | Away | |
| May 9 | Modesto Maniax | Home | |
| May 16 | Modesto Maniax | Away | |
| May 23 | Portland Shockwave | Away | |
| May 30 | California Quake | Home | |
| June 6 | Los Angeles Amazons | Away | |
