= Warbirds =

Warbirds may refer to:

- Warbird, any vintage military aircraft now operated by civilian organizations and individuals or historic arms of military forces
- Warbirds (video game), a 1991 computer game for the Atari Lynx
- WarBirds, a 1995 online computer game by Interactive Creations
- Warbirds (EP), a 2009 EP by This Is Hell
- Warbird (comics), name of two Marvel Comics characters
- Romulan Warbird, a class of ship in the Star Trek universe
- Seattle Warbirds, a team in the Women's Football Alliance
- Wilson Warbirds, a Minor League Baseball team
