= Nor Cal Red Hawks =

Women's football team in Redding, California

- Founded: 2009
- League: Independent Women's Football League (2009-present)
- Team history: Nor Cal Red Hawks (2009-present)
- Based in: Redding, California
- Colors: Red, Dark Blue
- Head coach: TBA
- Championships: 0
- Slogan: "Without Heart, You Don't Have a Game"

The Nor Cal Red Hawks are a women's football team based in Redding, California. They are members of the Independent Women's Football League. They played in 2010 as an exhibition team and began play of their first regular season in 2011 in Sacramento. However, injuries postponed their 2011 season. There is one other women's football team in Redding, who are in the same league as the Red Hawks: the Redding Rage. It was announced in 2012 that the team would relocate to Redding for 2013. The Red Hawks will now play in the IWFL's Pacific West division, along with the California Quake.

== Players ==
There were 13 players listed on the 2011 team roster. However, recruiting for the Red Hawks is still ongoing.

== 2013 schedule ==
Date	Opponent	Home/Away	Result
May 25	California Quake	Away	0-2 L
June 1	California Quake	Home	
June 8	Nevada Storm	Away	
June 15	Ventura Black Widows	Away	
June 29	Nevada Storm	Home	

== Season by season ==
Season records
Season	W	L	T	Finish	Playoff results
Nor Cal Red Hawks (IWFL)
2010	0	3	0	N/A	(exhibition)
2011	0	1	0	N/A	(cancelled)
2012	Did not play				
2013	0	1	0	N/A	
