= Portland Shockwave =

- Founded: 2002
- League: Independent Women's Football League 2002- 2012 Women's Football Alliance 2013 - present
- Team history: Portland Shockwave (2002–2015); Portland Fighting Shockwave (2015-present)
- Based in: Hillsboro, Oregon
- Stadium: Hillsboro Stadium
- Colors: black, maroon, and vegas gold
- Owner: Rebecca Brisson - President Rebecca Dawson - Vice President Hollie Petrie - Secretary
- Head coach: TBD
- Championships: 0

The Portland Fighting Shockwave is a women's professional football team competing in the Women's Football Alliance. The team is based in Portland, Oregon, and plays their home games at Hillsboro Stadium in nearby Hillsboro. They are the longest running women's semi-professional team in the Portland metropolitan area.

== History ==
For the 2005 season the Shockwave played their home games at Lincoln High School in Portland. During their fifth season in 2006, the team won the Pacific Northwest Division for the first time and made the Independent Women's Football League (IWFL) playoffs for the first time.

== Season-by-season statistics ==
Season records
Season	W	L	T	Finish	Playoff results
Oregon Thunder (IWFL)
2002	0	8	0	T-6th Western Division	--
Portland Shockwave (IWFL)
2003	5	3	1	3rd WC Pacific Northwest	--
2004	3	5	0	3rd WC Pacific Northwest	--
2005	3	5	0	3rd WC Pacific Northwest	--
2006	7	1	0	1st WC Pacific Northwest	Lost Western Conference Qualifier (Sacramento)
2007	6	2	0	2nd WC Pacific Northwest	--
2008	5	3	0	3rd Tier I WC Pacific Northwest	--
2009	4	4	0	2nd Tier I WC Pacific Northwest	--
2010	6	2	0	3rd Tier I WC Pacific West	--
2011	8	0	0	1st Tier I WC Pacific Northwest	Lost Western Conference Qualifier (Wisconsin Warriors)
2012	3	5	0	1st Tier II Pacific Northwest	Won Founders Bowl Quarterfinal (California); Won Founders Bowl Semifinal (Madison); Lost Founders Bowl Championship (Carolina)
Portland Shockwave (WFA)
2013	5	3	0	American Conference Div-11	--
2014	6	2	0	American Conference Div-11	--
Totals	63	46	1	(including playoffs)	

== Season schedules ==
=== 2009 ===
Date	Opponent	Home/Away	Result
April 18	Seattle Majestics	Home	
April 25	Corvallis Pride	Away	Won 20–7
May 2	Oakland Banshees	Home	Won 2–0**
May 9	Seattle Majestics	Away	Lost 7–35
May 16	Corvallis Pride	Home	Won 33–0
May 23	Seattle Majestics	Home	Lost 12–14
June 6	Seattle Majestics	Away	Lost 7–20
June 13	Corvallis Pride	Away	Won 26–6

** = Won by forfeit

=== 2010 ===
Date	Opponent	Home/Away	Result
April 10	Bay Area Bandits	Away	Lost 0–13
April 17	Modesto Maniax	Away	Won 22–8
April 24	Seattle Majestics	Home	Won 22–7
May 1	Seattle Majestics	Away	Won 20–14 (OT)
May 8	Los Angeles Amazons	Home	Lost 0–17
May 15	Seattle Majestics	Home	Won 20–14
May 29	Los Angeles Amazons	Away	Won 20–6
June 5	California Quake	Home	Won 7–6

=== 2013 ===
Date	Opponent	Home/Away	Result
April 6	Everett Reign	Away	Won 16–3
April 20	Portland Fighting Fillies	Home	Lost 0–6
April 27	Seattle Majestics	Away	Lost 7–27
May 4	Utah Blitz	Home	Won 25–7
May 11	Everett Reign	Home	Won 44–8
May 18	Tacoma Trauma	Away	Won 32–0
May 25	Portland Fighting Fillies	Away	Won 18–0
June 1	Seattle Majestics	Home	Lost 14–26

=== 2014 ===
Date	Opponent	Home/Away	Result
April 5	Seattle Majestics	Home	Lost 33–12
April 12	Portland Fighting Fillies	Away	Won 20–14
April 26	Tacoma Trauma	Away	Won 28–8
May 3	Seattle Majestics	Away	Lost 32–0
May 10	Portland Fighting Fillies	Home	Won 36–16
May 24	Utah Blitz	Away	Won 30–18
May 31	Everett Reign	Home	Won 8–3
June 7	Utah Blitz	Home	Won 32–0
