= Corvallis Pride =

- Founded: 2001
- Folded: 2009
- League: Independent Women's Football League
- Team history: Corvallis Pride (2001-2009)
- Based in: Corvallis, Oregon
- Stadium: Corvallis High School
- Colors: Blue, black, and gold
- President: Beth Buglione
- Head coach: Beth Buglione
- Championships: 0

The Corvallis Pride was a team of the Independent Women's Football League (IWFL) based in Corvallis, Oregon. Home games were played at Corvallis High School.

For the 2009 season, the Pride merged with fellow IWFL team, the Redding Rage.

For the 2010 season, the Pride did not field a team because of insufficient players to safely compete against the Tier I teams on their schedule.

== Results ==
Season records
| Season | W | L | T | Finish | Playoff results |
|---|---|---|---|---|---|
Corvallis Pride (IWFL)
| 2002 | 8 | 1 | 0 | 1st Western | Lost Western Conference Championship (Austin) |
| 2003 | 6 | 2 | 1 | 2nd Western Pacific Northwest | Lost Western Conference Semifinal (Chicago) |
| 2004 | 7 | 3 | 0 | 2nd Western Pacific Northwest | Won Western Conference Semifinal (Oakland); Lost Western Conference Championship (Sacramento) |
| 2005 | 8 | 3 | 0 | 2nd Western Pacific Northwest | Lost Western Conference Semifinal (Sacramento) |
| 2006 | 5 | 3 | 0 | 3rd Western Pacific Northwest | -- |
| 2007 | 2 | 6 | 0 | 3rd Western Pacific Northwest | -- |
| 2008 | 5 | 4 | 0 | 2nd Western Pacific Northwest | Lost Western Conference Semifinal (Seattle) |
| 2009 | 2 | 6 | 0 | 3rd Western Pacific Northwest | -- |
| Totals | 43 | 28 | 1 | (including playoffs) | |

== Season schedules ==
=== 2009 ===
| Date | Opponent | Home/Away | Result |
|---|---|---|---|
| April 11 | Seattle Majestics | Away | Lost 0-34 |
| April 25 | Portland Shockwave | Home | Lost 7-20 |
| May 2 | Sacramento Sirens | Away | Lost 0-39 |
| May 16 | Portland Shockwave | Away | Lost 0-33 |
| May 23 | Redding Rage | Home | Won 2–0** |
| May 30 | Sacramento Sirens | Home | Lost 0-48 |
| June 6 | Modesto Maniax | Away | Won 20–8 |
| June 13 | Portland Shockwave | Home | Lost 6-26 |

** = Won by forfeit

== Players ==
=== 2008 ===
Tara Jennings

Melody Peterson

Michelle Sayer

Crystal Pender

Cambria Grace

Megan Hussy

Michelle Derry

Lindsey Kuper

Marquetta Medina

Sheena Schrock

Josanna Holzapfel

Kara Leonard

Christi Le Mieux

Beth Schuff

Ronny Mason

Rosie Richards

Holly Custis

Jayme Frazier

Leah Hinkle

Andrea Land

Coco Rallings

Simone Shepard

Megan Cadwall

Natalie Nash

Rebecca Tully

Mariya Efseaff

Krystal Meisnar

Tracy Hartz

Donita Gaudern

Heidi Loebach
