= Tucson Monsoon =

Independent Women's Football League team

- Founded: 2006
- League: Independent Women's Football League
- Team history: 2006-present
- Based in: Tucson, Arizona
- Stadium: Rincon High School & Sahauro High School
- Colors: teal, red, black
- Owner: Robert and Kristie Godbout
- Head coach: Ben Hite
- Championships: 0

The Tucson Monsoon is a football team in the Independent Women's Football League based in Tucson, Arizona. Home games are played on the campuses of Rincon High School & Sahauro High School.

== Season-by-season ==
Season records
Season	W	L	T	Finish	Playoff results
Tucson Monsoon (IWFL)
2006	0	6	0	X-Team	--
2007	1	7	0	4th West Pacific Southwest	--
2008	2	6	0	4th Tier I West Pacific Southwest	--
2009	5	3	0	14th Tier II	--
2010*	1	2	0	2nd Tier II West Pacific West	--
Totals	9	24	0		

* = Current Standing

== Season schedules ==
=== 2009 ===
Date	Opponent	Home/Away	Result
April 11	New Mexico Menace	Home	Won 8-0
April 25	Modesto Maniax	Away	Won 12-8
May 2	New Mexico Menace	Away	Won 54-0
May 9	Southern California Breakers	Home	Won 14-13
May 16	Southern California Breakers	Away	Lost 6-32
May 23	New Mexico Menace	Away	Won 55-7
May 30	Los Angeles Amazons	Home	Lost 0-57
June 13	Seattle Majestics	Home	Lost 0-55

=== 2010 ===
Date	Opponent	Home/Away	Result
April 3	Southern California Breakers	Home	Won 3-0
April 10	California Quake	Home	Lost 20-60
April 17	So Cal Scorpions	Away	Lost 0-54
May 1	California Quake	Home	
May 8	Southern California Breakers	Away	
May 22	So Cal Scorpions	Home	
May 29	Sacramento Sirens	Away	
June 5	Seattle Majestics	Away	

=== 2013 ===
Date	Opponent	Home/Away	Result
May 1	Non IWFL Team	Home	Won Forfeit
May 11	California Quake	Home	Lost 19-38
May 18	Colorado ThunderKatz	Away	Lost 7-20
June 1	Non IWFL Team	Away	Win Forfeit
June 8	Phoenix Phantomz	Home	Cancelled
June 15	California Quake	Away	6-56
June 22	Phoenix Phantomz	Away	Cancelled
June 5	Colorado ThunderKatz	Home	7-14
