= Chop block =

A chop block may refer to:

- Chop block (gridiron football), an illegal play
- Chop block, a professional wrestling strike

== See also ==
- Chopping Block (disambiguation)
