= Seattle Spartans =

Women's Football Alliance team

- Founded: 2012 (as Everett Reign)
- League: Women's Football Alliance (2019-2022)
- Based in: Seattle, Washington
- Stadium: Everett Memorial Stadium
- Colors: green, white, silver, black
- Owner: Nicole Pelham
- Head coach: Boni Wansley
- Championships: 0
- Local media: wfa-spartans.com

The Seattle Spartans are a Women's Football Alliance team based in Everett, Washington. The team was founded in 2012 and originally named Everett Reign. They play at Everett Memorial Stadium.

== History ==
Everett Reign was founded in 2012 by Billy Russo, and he served as its head coach. In 2018, Russo sold the team to player Nicole Pelham. The team was renamed to the Seattle Spartans.

== Season-by-season ==
Season	Wins	Losses
2013	3	5
2016	2	6
2017	6	2
2018	6	3
2019	2	6
2020	cancelled	
2021	2	4
2022	1	5

=== 2013 ===
In the teams's first season they went 3–5. They also had 2 players (Joleen Sims and Jordan Rice) selected as first team All-American and 1 player (LeAnn Layman) selected as second team All-American to play in the All-Star game.

==== Season schedule ====
Date	Opponent	Home/Away	Result
4/6	Portland Shockwave	Home	Lost 16–3
4/20	Utah Blitz	Away	Won 22–6
4/27	Tacoma Trauma	Home	Won 46–6
5/4	Portland Fighting Fillies	Away	Lost 16–6
5/11	Portland Shockwave	Away	Lost 44–8
5/25	Seattle Majestics	Home	Lost 35–0
6/1	Tacoma Trauma	Away	Lost 24–0
6/8	Portland Fighting Fillies	Away	Won 14–13
