= Blocking below the waist =

Illegal block in gridiron football

In gridiron football, blocking below the waist is an illegal block, from any direction, below the waist by any defensive player or by an offensive player under certain situations, by any player after change of possession, with certain exceptions. It is sometimes incorrectly referred to as a "chop block". Such blocks are banned due to the risk of injury, particularly those to the knee and ankle. The penalty for a block below the waist is 15 yards in the NFL, NCAA, and in high school. The block is illegal unless it is against the ball carrier.

In the NFL, blocking below the waist is illegal during kicking plays and after a change of possession. Illegal crackback blocks, peel-back blocks and cut blocks are called during other times when an illegal block is made below the waist.

It was during the 1970s that the rules prohibiting these blocks were instituted in various leagues. Blocking below the waist was initially banned in 1970 in the NCAA after a unanimous vote.
