= Sacramento Sirens =

Women's American football team

- Founded: 2001; 25 years ago
- League: WTFL (2021-Present)
- Team history: WAFL (2001); WAFC (2002); IWFL (2003-2012, 2015-); WFA (2013, 2021)
- Based in: Sacramento, California
- Colors: Black, Vegas Gold, Teal
- Owner: Nic O'Neal
- Head coach: Nic O'Neal
- Championships: 4 (WAFC: 2002) (IWFL: 2003, 2004, 2005)
- Dancers: Sirens Cheer Elite
- Local media: Patrick McCann
- Defensive Coordinator: Brian McCann Jr.
- Offensive Coordinator: Brian McCann

The Sacramento Sirens are a women's semi-professional American football team, located in Sacramento, California. The team has compiled one of the most successful records in women's full tackle football.

== History ==
In 2001, their first year of existence, the Sirens won the divisional title and advanced to the playoffs of the Women's American Football League. In 2002 the Sirens took the league title in the championship game against the Arizona Caliente.

Joining a larger league in 2003, the Independent Women's Football League (IWFL), the Sirens traveled to New York to capture their second consecutive championship title, beating the New York Sharks. In 2004 Sacramento hosted the IWFL National Championship game where the Sirens defeated their New York rival again. A year later, in Manchester, New Hampshire, the Sirens defeated the Atlanta Xplosion in the 2005 IWFL national championship.

In 2006 the Sirens had another successful year, as they finished 6–2 to win another division title and defeat the Portland Shockwave in the Western Conference Semifinal. However, one week later, the Sirens lost the Western Conference Championship to the Detroit Demolition by a score of 50–32, marking the first time in five years that the Sirens did not win their league's championship.

In 2007, the Sirens finished 7–1, winning another division title and defeating the Seattle Majestics in the semifinal round. As they had done the year before, the Sirens would lose the conference championship again to the Detroit Demolition, this time by a score of 49–0.

But in 2008, the Sirens had a bad season, finishing at 4-4 and fourth place in the Pacific Northwest division, the Sirens, for the first time in team history had failed to win the division championship, qualify for the playoffs, or accomplish a winning season.

In 2009, the Sirens returned to their winning ways, finishing 5–3. However, that was still not enough for the Sirens to return to the playoffs.

However, 2010 marked the Sirens' return to dominance, as they finished 8-0 and once again won the Pacific West division title. The Sirens faced the Boston Militia in the IWFL national championship game on July 24, 2010, and lost 39–7.

== Season-by-season ==
Season records
Season	W	L	T	Finish	Playoff results
Sacramento Sirens (WAFL)
2001	7	2	1	1st Pacific Central Division	Lost Pacific Conference Semifinal (California)
2001	0	1	0	Post Season	
Sacramento Sirens (WAFC)
2002	8	0	0	1st League	Won WAFC Semifinal (Oakland); Won WAFC Championship (Arizona)
2002	2	0	0	Post Season	
Sacramento Sirens (IWFL)
2003	8	0	0	1st West Pacific SouthWest	Won Western Conference Semifinal (Seattle); Won Western Conference Championship (Chicago); Won IWFL Championship (New York)
2003	3	0	0	Post Season	
2004	7	1	0	1st West Pacific West	Won Western Conference Semifinal (Seattle); Won Western Conference Championship (Corvallis); Won IWFL Championship (New York)
2004	3	0	0	Post Season	
2005	10	0	0	1st West Pacific Southwest	Won Western Conference Semifinal (Corvallis); Won Western Conference Championship (Seattle); Won IWFL Championship (Atlanta)
2005	3	0	0	Post Season	
2006	6	2	0	1st West Pacific Southwest	Won Western Conference Semifinal (Portland); Lost Western Conference Championship (Detroit)
2006	1	1	0	Post Season	
2007	7	1	0	1st West Pacific Southwest	Won Western Conference Semifinal (Seattle); Lost Western Conference Championship (Detroit)
2007	1	1	0	Post Season	
2008	4	4	0	4th West Pacific Northwest	--
2009	5	3	0	2nd West Pacific Southwest	--
2010	8	0	0	1st West Pacific West	Won Pacific West Division Championship (So Cal); Won Western Conference Championship (Dallas); Lost IWFL Championship (Boston)
2010	2	1	0	Post Season	
2011	5	4	0	1st West Pacific Southwest	Lost Western Conference Semifinal (California)
2011	0	1	0	Post Season	
2012	7	1	0	1st West Pacific Southwest	Won Western Conference Semifinal (Seattle); Won Western Conference Championship (Wisconsin); Lost IWFL Championship (Montreal)
2012	2	1	0	Post Season	
Sacramento Sirens (WFA)
2013	4	3	0	--	
2013	1	1	0	Post Season	
Sacramento Sirens
2014	0	0	0	Team Inactive	
Sacramento Sirens (IWFL)
2015	8	0	0	1st Pacific West Division	Lost Pacific Conference Semifinal (Utah)
2015	0	1	0	Post Season	
Sacramento Sirens (IWFL)
2016*	0	0	0	--	
Totals	112	29	1	(including post season)	

* = Current Standing

== Season schedules ==
=== 2009 ===
Date	Opponent	Home/Away	Result
April 11	Modesto Maniax	Away	Won 71-0
April 18	California Quake	Home	Won 46-0
April 25	Seattle Majestics	Away	Lost 8-33
May 2	Corvallis Pride	Home	Won 39-0
May 9	California Quake	Away	Won 34-14
May 16	Seattle Majestics	Home	Lost 20-21
May 30	Corvallis Pride	Away	Won 48-0
June 13	Los Angeles Amazons	Home	Lost 19-20

=== 2010 ===
Date	Opponent	Home/Away	Result
April 3	Bay Area Bandits	Home	Won 33-13
April 10	Seattle Majestics	Away	Won 35-14
April 24	Los Angeles Amazons	Away	Won 27-26
May 1	Modesto Maniax	Away	Won 68-0
May 15	Modesto Maniax	Away	Won 55-0
May 22	Los Angeles Amazons	Home	Won 10-6
May 29	Tucson Monsoon	Home	Won 73-0
June 5	Modesto Maniax	Home	Won 60-0
June 12	So Cal Scorpions	Home	Won 60-26
July 10	Dallas Diamonds	Home	Won 45-43
July 24	Boston Militia	Austin, TX	Lost 39-7
