= Redding Rage =

Women's football team, California, USA

The Redding Rage was a professional women's football team based out of Redding, California, that were members of the Independent Women's Football League. They played their home games at various locations in the Redding area. They played in the league's new Tier III along with the Cape Fear Thunder, the Detroit Demolition, the New Mexico Menace, the Nor Cal Red Hawks, the Orlando Mayhem, The Pittsburgh Pulse, and the Shreveport Aftershock.
