= Dead zone (gridiron football) =

American football rule

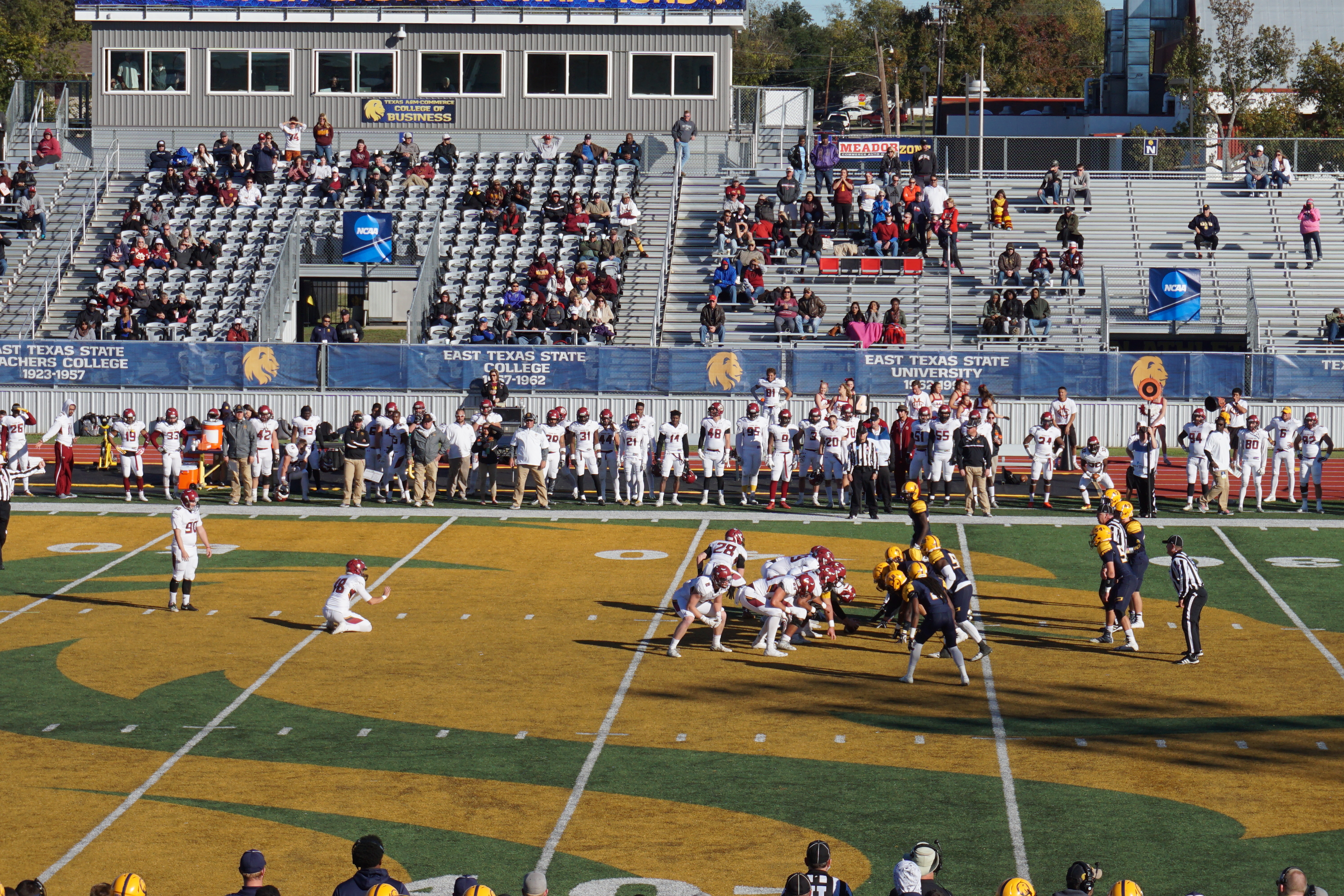
The Colorado Mesa Mavericks attempt a 54-yard field goal from the 37-yard line against the Texas A&M-Commerce Lions in 2016. A field goal from that range has a low rate of success but was chosen over punting or going for a fourth down conversion.

The dead zone (also known as four-down territory or no man's land) is an area on the field of gridiron football where an offense is on their opponent's side of the field, but kicking a field goal would likely be unsuccessful and punting the ball would not dramatically change field position.

The location and size of a football team's dead zone may vary, depending on the effective field goal range of the offensive team's kicker. For instance, at the college level, it can generally exist anywhere from the opponent's 33 to 43-yard line, where a field goal attempt would be between 50 and 60 yards and punting the ball would likely result in a touchback (the punt bounces into the opponent's end zone and they begin their drive on their own 20-yard line resulting in a net gain of 13-23 yards on the punt). A team's decision on fourth down in the dead zone whether to punt or attempt a field goal is also dependent on the game score and time remaining. Many teams that find themselves in the dead zone prefer trying to convert a short fourth down rather than risk a missed field goal or punting the ball for minimal gain. However, as field goal kickers in the NFL have become increasingly accurate (especially from longer distances), the dead zone on an NFL football field has tended to be further back and decreased in size. For instance, as recent as 2013 NFL kickers were successful on 67.13% of their field goal attempts 50 yards or longer (a 50-yard field goal attempt means the offence was at their opponent's 33-yard line when attempting the field goal).
