= Field goal =

Means of scoring in gridiron football

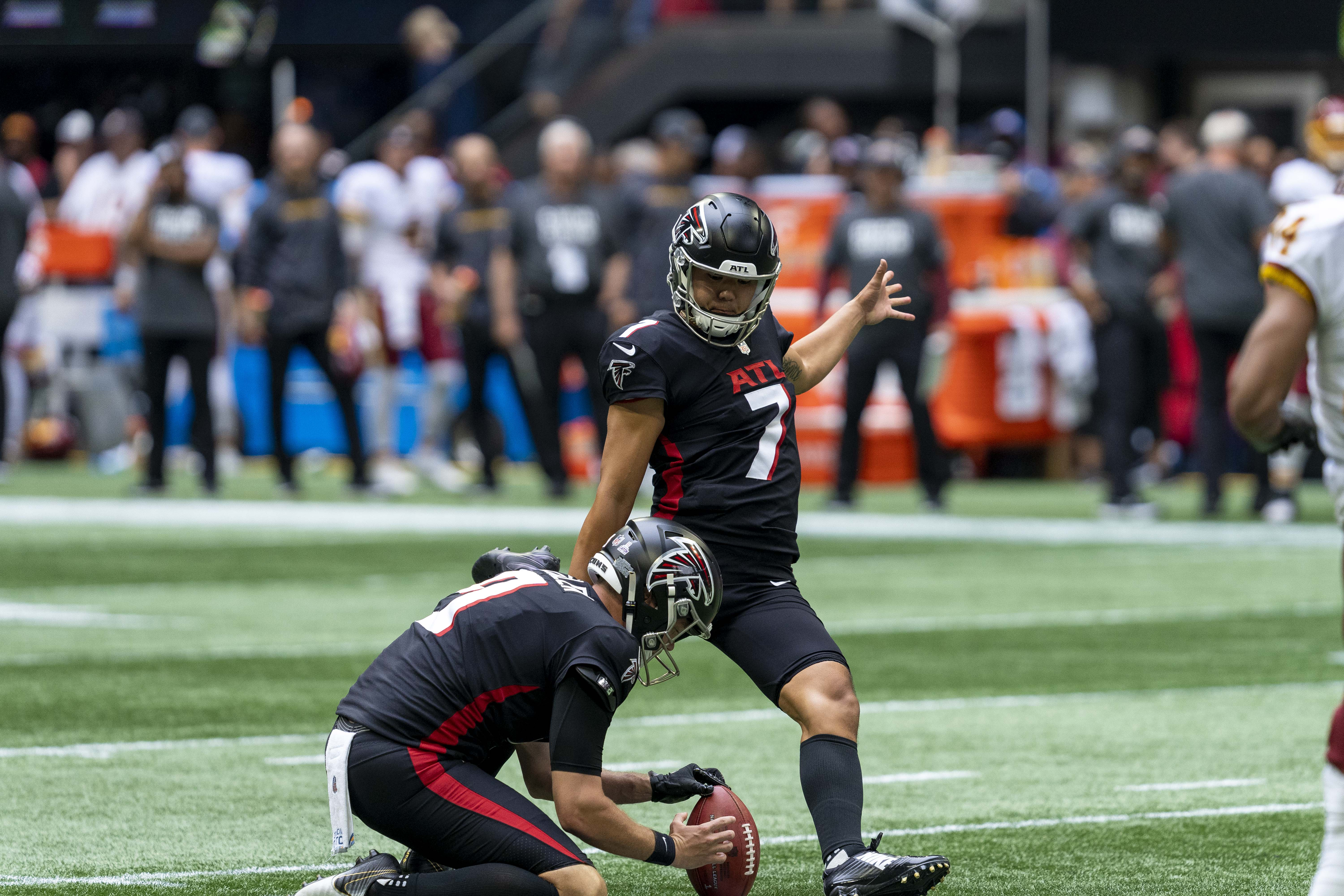
Younghoe Koo (right) of the Atlanta Falcons attempts a field goal, while Cameron Nizialek (left) serves as the holder.

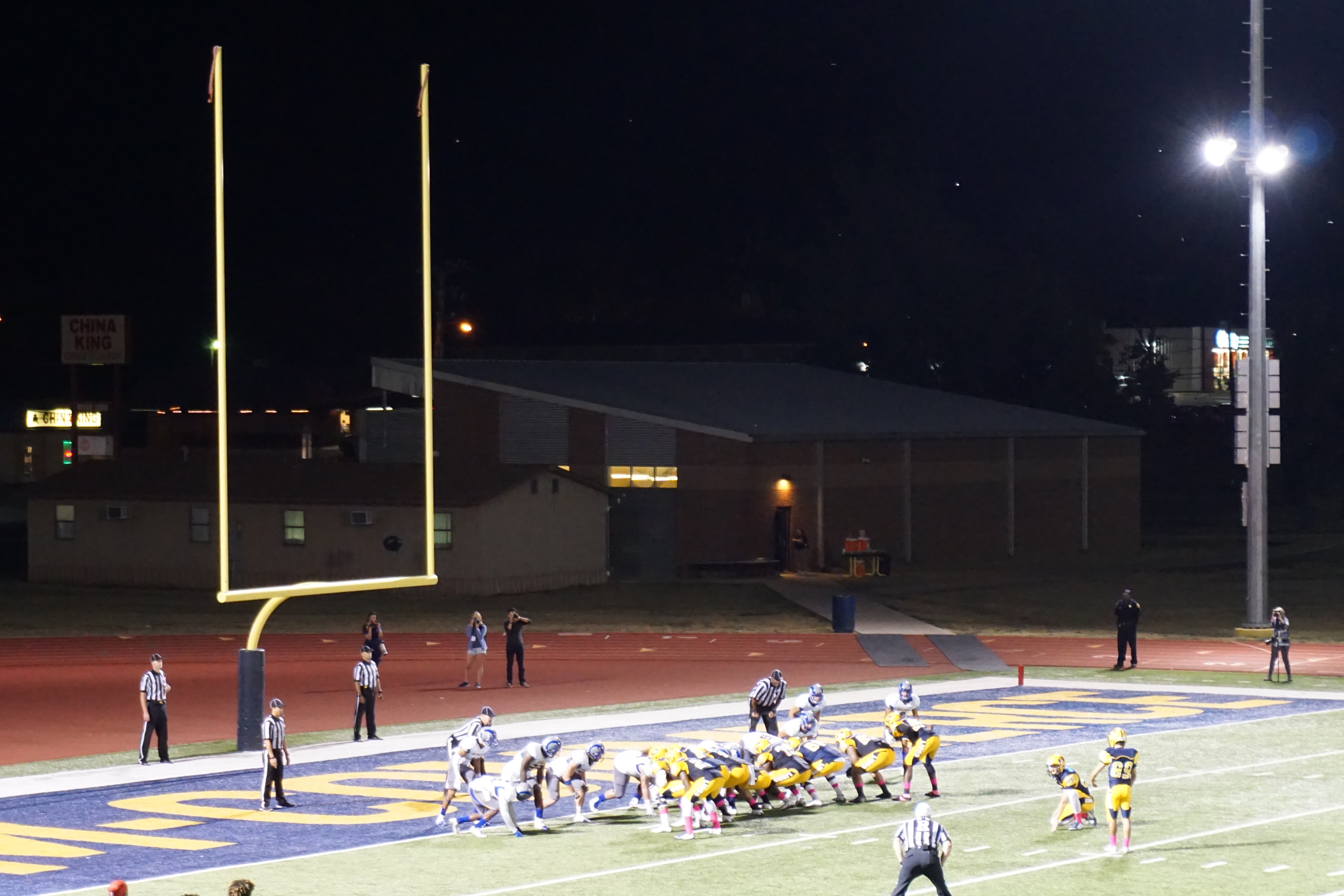
A team preparing to kick a field goal through the uprights at left

A field goal (FG) is a means of scoring in gridiron football. To score a field goal, the team in possession of the ball must place kick, or drop kick, the ball through the goal, i.e., between the uprights and over the crossbar. Consequently, a field goal cannot be scored from a punt, as the ball must touch the ground at one point after the snap and before it is kicked in order to be a valid field goal. The entire ball must pass through the vertical plane of the goal, which is the area above the crossbar and between the uprights or, if above the uprights, between their outside edges. (Note: An exception applies with respect to goalposts that have a remote-controlled camera mounted on top of the crossbar, often now used in nationally televised games. A field goal attempt will still be considered good if the ball strikes such a camera instead of passing over the crossbar.) American football requires that a field goal must only come during a play from scrimmage (except in the case of a fair catch kick) while Canadian football retains open field kicks and thus field goals may be scored at any time from anywhere on the field and by any player. The vast majority of field goals, in both codes, are placekicked. Drop-kicked field goals were common in the early days of gridiron football but are almost never attempted in modern times. A field goal may also be scored through a fair catch kick, but this is also extremely rare. In most leagues, a successful field goal awards three points (a notable exception is six-man football in which, due to the small number of players available to stop the opposing team from blocking the kick, a field goal is worth four points).

Since a field goal is worth only three points, as opposed to a touchdown, which is worth six points (a one- or two-point conversion can also be added), it is usually only attempted in specific situations, such as when the offense has reached its final down but has advanced the ball into field goal range, or when there is not enough time left in the half to score a touchdown.

The goal structure consists of a horizontal crossbar suspended 10 feet (3.0 m) above the ground, with two vertical goalposts 18 feet 6 inches (5.64 m) apart extending vertically from each end of the crossbar. In American football, the goals are centered on each end line; in Canadian football, they are centered on each goal line. In order for a field goal to be scored, or to be "good", the entire ball must pass through the rectangular plane formed by the bottom horizontal crossbar and two vertical uprights formed by the goalpost. If a field goal fails to pass through this plane, it is "no good" and no score is awarded.

If a team scores a field goal, they kickoff to return possession of the ball to the opposing team. If a field goal attempt is unsuccessful, possession of the ball is turned over to the opposing team where the line of scrimmage of the field goal attempt was in the NCAA, or at the spot of the kick, the spot where the placekicker made contact with the ball, in the NFL.

== Strategy ==
As a field goal is worth only three points, while a touchdown scores at least six (which usually becomes seven with a successful conversion, and potentially eight with a two-point conversion), teams will generally attempt a field goal only in the following situations:

- It is last down (third in Canadian football, fourth down in American football), especially if the offense is more than a yard or two from a new first down, and within kicking range of the goalposts (about 45 yards at the professional level).
- In the first half, if there is only enough time remaining to execute just one more play, regardless of the down.
- In the waning moments of the second half, if a successful kick will win or tie the game. In this situation, a team may choose to attempt the field goal on an earlier down or if there is still enough time remaining to execute more than one play. If there are problems with the snap or hold, the team would be then able to abort the kick attempt (kneel down, or throw an incomplete pass), and still have at least one down and time remaining to re-attempt the kick.
- In overtime, if a successful field goal wins and ends the game, a team may choose to attempt a game-winning kick as soon as they get into field goal range (for example, a long pass completion that advances the ball inside the opponent's 20-yard line). In this situation, a team may just decide to try to end the game rather than risk another play that could result in a turnover.

Except in desperate situations, a team will generally attempt field goals only when keeping a drive alive is unlikely, and its kicker has a significant chance of success, as a missed field goal results in a turnover at the spot of the kick (in the NFL) or at the line of scrimmage (in the NCAA). In American high school rules and Canadian football, where a missed field goal is treated the same as a punt, most teams still opt not to attempt field goals from very long range since field goal formations are not conducive to covering kick returns. Even under ideal conditions, the best professional kickers historically had difficulty making kicks longer than 50 yards consistently. If a team chooses not to attempt a field goal on their last down, they can punt to the other team. A punt cannot score any points in American football unless the receiving team touches the ball first and the kicking team recovers it (though it can result in a single in Canadian football), but it may push the other team back toward its own end.

The longest field goal kick in NFL history is 68 yards, a record set by Cam Little on 2 November 2025, which broke the record previously held by Justin Tucker (2021) at 66 yards. Little also kicked a 70-yard field goal in a preseason game in 2025. The record in the CFL is 63 yards, set by Sergio Castillo on August 9, 2025, tying a 24-year-old record by Paul McCallum, which was believed for years to have been 62 yards, though evidence confirmed McCallum's kick was actually closer to 63 yards. High school, college and most professional football leagues offer only a three-point field goal; however, some professional leagues have encouraged more rare kicks through four-point field goals. NFL Europe encouraged long field goals of 50 yards or more by making those worth four points instead of three (much like Australian rules' Super Goal or basketball's three-point line), a rule since adopted by the Stars Football League. Similarly, the sport of arena football sought (unsuccessfully) to repopularize the drop kick by making that worth four points; it failed since only one kicker (Brian Mitchell) was able to do it with any semblance of proficiency. In six-man football, all field goals are worth four points instead of the usual three. The overall field goal percentage during the 2010 NFL season was 82.3%. In comparison, Jan Stenerud, one of only three pure kickers in the Pro Football Hall of Fame (along with fellow placekicker Morten Andersen and punter Ray Guy), had a career field goal percentage of 66.8% from 1967 to 1985.

== How field goals are kicked ==
Video of a successful field goal try.

When a team decides to attempt a field goal, it will generally line up in a very tight formation, with all but two players lined up along or near the line of scrimmage: the placekicker and the holder. The holder is usually the team's punter or backup quarterback. Instead of the regular center, a team may have a dedicated long snapper trained especially to snap the ball on placekick attempts and punts.

The holder usually lines up seven to eight yards behind the line of scrimmage, with the kicker a few yards behind him. Upon receiving the snap, the holder holds the ball against the ground vertically, with the stitches away from the kicker. The kicker begins his approach during the snap, so the snapper and holder have little margin for error. A split-second mistake can disrupt the entire attempt. Depending on the level of play, the ball, upon reaching the holder, is held up by either the aid of a small rubber "tee" (all ranks up to the high school level, which is not the same as the kickoff tee, but rather a small platform, and comes in either 1- or 2-inch varieties) or is placed on the ground (in college and at the professional level).

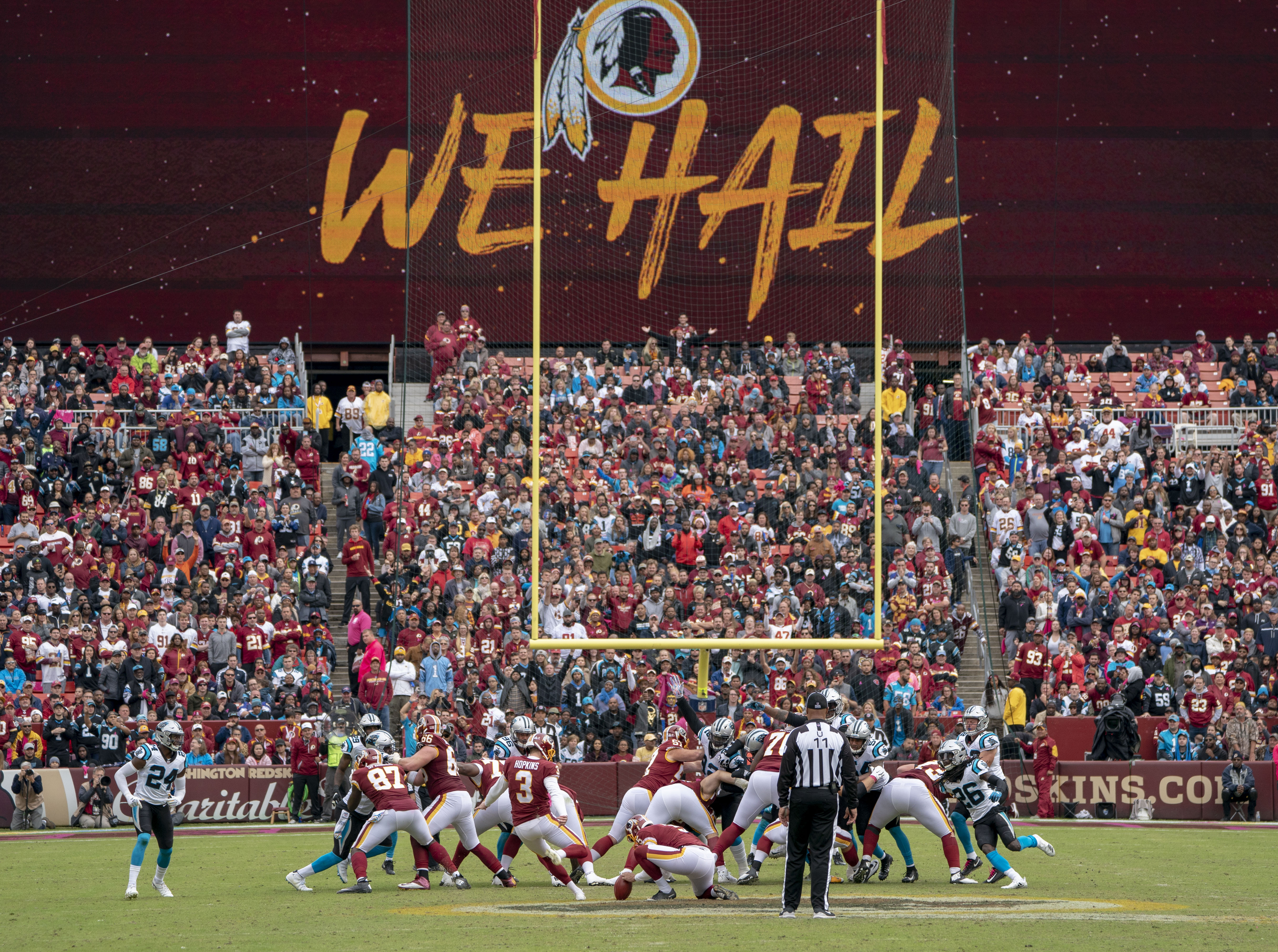
Dustin Hopkins of the Washington Redskins attempts a field goal against the Carolina Panthers in 2018

The measurement of a field goal's distance is from the goalpost to the point where the ball was positioned for the kick by the holder. In American football, where the goalpost is located at the back of the end zone (above the end line), the ten yards of the end zone are added to the yard line distance at the spot of the hold.

Until the 1960s, placekickers approached the ball straight on, with the toe making first contact with the ball. The technique of kicking the ball "soccer-style", by approaching the ball at an angle and kicking it with the instep, was introduced by Hungarian-born kicker Pete Gogolak in the 1960s. Reflecting his roots in European soccer, Gogolak observed that kicking the ball at an angle could cover more distance than kicking straight-on; he played college football at Cornell and made his pro debut in 1964 with the Buffalo Bills of the AFL; his younger brother Charlie was also an NFL kicker. The soccer-style kick gained popularity and was nearly universal by the late 1970s; the last full-time straight-on kicker in the NFL was Mark Moseley, who retired in 1986.

== Successful field goals ==
If there is any time left in the half, the method of resuming play after a successful field goal varies between leagues.

National Football League and most professional leagues and the National Collegiate Athletic Association
The scored-against team receives a kickoff.
National Federation of High Schools
The scored-against team can choose to either receive a kickoff or kick off themselves. (In practice, almost all choose to receive.)
Canadian Football League
The scored-against team may elect to either kick off from their 30-yard line, receive a kickoff from the opponents' 30-yard line, or scrimmage from their own 40-yard line. In the last three minutes of the fourth quarter, the scoring team kicks off from their 30-yard line. The option of scrimmaging (no kickoff), first instituted in 1975, was eliminated in 2009, but the change proved unpopular and was reinstated the following season.
Football Canada
The scored-against team may elect to either kick off from their 35-yard line, receive a kickoff from the opponent's 45-yard line, or scrimmage from their own 35-yard line.

== Missed field goals ==
A missed field goal is said to be "no good" if the kicked ball does not cross between the uprights and over the crossbar of the goal posts. If it misses to the side of the uprights, it may be called "wide left" or "wide right". A field goal attempt may be described as "short" if it does not have sufficient distance to go over the cross bar. Some commentators will only describe a field goal attempt as being short if it appears to have been aimed correctly while others will describe an attempt appearing to lack both accuracy and distance as being both wide and short.

If a field goal attempt is missed, and the ball does not go out of bounds and has not been ruled dead by a referee, then a defensive player may advance the ball, as with a punt or kickoff. This type of play usually occurs either during an extremely long field goal attempt or if the attempt is blocked. If there is a significant likelihood of a miss and the strategic game situation warrants it, the defense places a player downfield, in or near their end zone, to catch the ball. The risk in this is that the return man may be tackled deep in his own territory, at a considerably worse position than he could have gotten by letting the ball go dead (see below); furthermore, should the returner fumble the ball, the kicking team can recover it and gain a new set of downs (the advantage is that the kicking team is lined up very close together to stop kick blockers, and not spread across the field like a kickoff or punt team, and is therefore in poor position to defend the return). Thus, teams will usually return a kick only towards the end of a half (when the kick will be the final play) or in a particularly desperate situation.

If a ball caroms off one of the goal posts or the crossbar but lands in the field of play, the ball is considered dead and cannot be returned. (This is not the case in arena football, where large "rebound nets" surround the goal posts for the explicit purpose of keeping the ball in play.) However, if the ball continues into the goal after caroming, the score counts. If the ball re-enters the field of play after crossing the vertical plane of the goal, the score also counts; this is now known as the "Phil Dawson rule" after the eponymous player scored a game-tying field goal that rebounded off the back support of the goal and back into the field of play.

Situations where the defense does not return a missed field goal vary between leagues and levels of play:

National Football League
Missed field goals attempted from the defending team's 20-yard line or closer result in the defense taking possession at their 20-yard line. Missed field goals attempted from behind the 20-yard line result in the opposing team taking possession at the spot of the kick. (From 1974–1993, the opposing team would take possession at the line of scrimmage, unless the kick was attempted from inside the 20-yard line, in which case the opposing team would take possession at the 20-yard line. Prior to 1974, a missed field goal was treated the same as a punt, and the kicking team could down the ball in the field of play if it did not cross the goal line; if the unsuccessful attempt crossed the goal line, it was a touchback, unless the defense ran the ball out of the end zone, which did not become legal until 1971.)
NCAA
The opposing team takes possession at the line of scrimmage rather than at the spot of the kick. If the line of scrimmage is inside the 20-yard line, the opposing team takes possession at the 20.
High school
Under NFHS (high school) rules (except Texas, which plays largely by NCAA rules), a field goal attempt is no different from any other scrimmage kick (e.g. punt or drop kick). If the field goal attempt is no good and enters the end zone it is a touchback (NFHS rules do not allow a scrimmage kick or free kick to be advanced if it crosses the goal line). If the ball becomes dead on the field the defensive team will next put the ball in play from that point. If a field goal is blocked behind the line of scrimmage either team may pick it up and return it (see below).
Canadian football
If the defense does not return a missed field goal out of the end zone, or if a missed field goal attempt goes out the back of end zone, then the kicking team scores a single point. This sometimes results in the team on defense stationing their punter behind the goal posts to punt the ball out of the end zone, in case of a missed field-goal attempt, to preserve a victory or tie. Also, a missed field goal may be played by any onside player on the kicking team (onside players being the kicker and anyone behind him at the time of the kick). It is risky to have anyone positioned behind the kicker when the ball is being kicked since those players would be unable to help prevent the defending players from blocking the kick; however, on occasion teams might intentionally miss a field goal in hope of recovering the ball in the end zone for a touchdown. Returning a missed field goal is much more likely in Canadian football than in American rules for a few reasons. First, since the goal posts are on the goal line in front of a 20-yard end zone (rather than at the back of a 10-yard end zone), a missed field goal is much less likely to go out of bounds while in the air. Also, not returning the ball out of the end zone results in the defense conceding a single point, which may be crucial in a close game. Moreover, the wider field of the Canadian game makes the average return longer (in terms of yardage). However, many Canadian football coaches judge that conceding a single and taking possession at the 35-yard line is preferable to returning a missed field goal and avoiding a single at the cost of poor field position.

== Blocked field goals ==
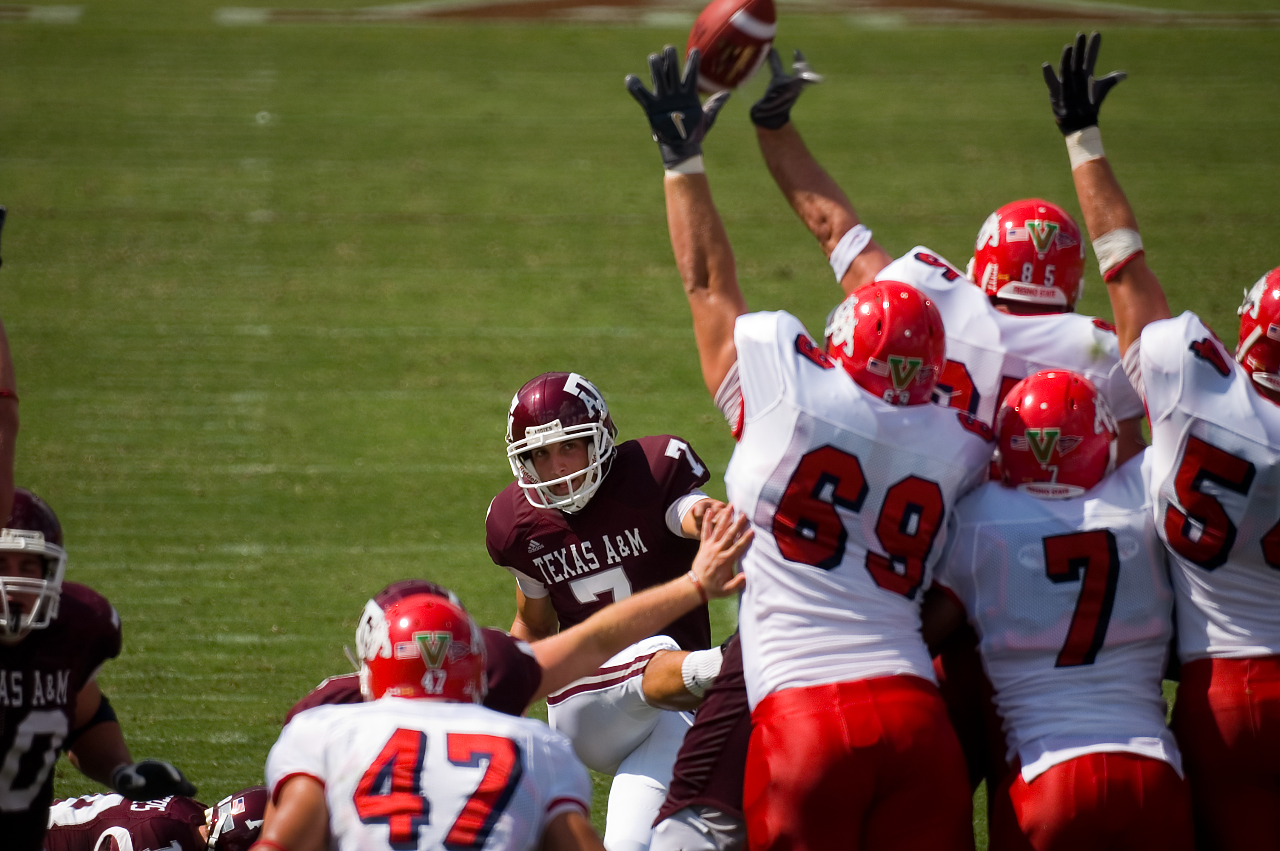
The Fresno State Bulldogs block a Texas A&M field goal attempt.

Occasionally, the defense will succeed in blocking a field goal. If the ball falls in or behind the neutral zone, it is treated like a fumble and can be advanced by either team. If the ball instead falls forward beyond the neutral zone, it is treated like a missed field goal under the rules explained above.

== History ==
In the early days of football, kicking was emphasized. In 1883, the scoring system was devised with field goals counting for five points, touchdowns two points, and conversions four points. In the following year touchdowns doubled in value to four, and rose to five in 1898. Meanwhile, the value of a conversion fell to two points in 1884 and one point in 1898. (In 1958, the NCAA created the two-point conversion for conversions scored via run or pass; the NFL followed suit in 1994.) Field goals were devalued to four points in 1904, and then to the modern three points in 1909. The touchdown was changed to six points in 1912 in American football; the Canadian game followed suit in 1956.

The spot of the conversion has also changed through the years. In 1924, NCAA rules spotted the conversion at the 3-yard line, before moving it back to the 5-yard line in 1925. In 1929, the spot was moved up to the 2-yard line, matching the NFL. In 1968, the NCAA diverged from the NFL rules and moved the spot back to the original 3-yard line. Canadian rules originally spotted the conversion at the 5-yard line, which remains closer than in the American code (for kicked conversions) as the goalposts are at the front of the end zone.

In 2015, to make conversion kicks harder, the NFL and CFL moved the line of scrimmage for conversion kicks to the 15- and 25-yard lines, respectively. (The CFL also moved the spot for two-point conversion attempts to the 3-yard line, while then NFL remained at the 2-yard line.)

The goalposts were originally located on the goal line; this led to many injuries and sometimes interfered with play. The NCAA moved the goal posts to the rear of the end zone in 1927. The NFL (still following NCAA rules at the time) followed suit, but moved the posts back to the goal line starting in the 1932 NFL Playoff Game, a change made necessary by the size of the indoor Chicago Stadium and kept when the NFL rules stopped mirroring the NCAA rules in 1933. The NFL kept the goal posts at the goal line until 1974, when they were moved back to the rear of the end zone, where they have remained since. This was partly a result of the narrowed hashmark distance made in 1972 (making them the same width as the goalposts), which had made for easier field-goal angles. The Canadian game still has posts on the goal line.

The width of the goalposts and the hashmarks have also varied throughout the years. In 1959, the NCAA goalposts were widened to 23 feet 4 inches (7.11 m), the standard width for high school posts today. In 1991, the college goalposts were reduced in width to 18 ft 6 in (5.64 m), matching the NFL. For the 1991 and 1992 seasons, this meant potentially severe angles for short field goal attempts, since the hashmark width remained at 53 ft 4 in (16.26 m). In 1993, the NCAA narrowed the distance between the hashmarks to 40 ft (12.19 m), matching the width of hashmarks in the NFL from 1945 through 1971; as mentioned above, the NFL narrowed the hashmarks in 1972 to goalpost width at 18.5 feet (5.64 m). Canadian hash marks in amateur play are 51 feet (16 m) apart, 24 yards from each sideline. The Canadian Football League formerly used this spacing, but narrowed the hash mark spacing to 9 yards (8.2 m) in 2022. The Canadian field is 195 feet (59 m) in width, 35 feet (11 m) wider than the American field.

The NFL increased the height of the uprights above the crossbar to 20 feet (6.10 m) in 1966 and 30 feet (9.14 m) in 1974. In 2014, they were raised five feet to 35 feet (10.67 m) after the adoption of a proposal by New England Patriots head coach Bill Belichick.

The "slingshot" goalpost, having a single post curving 90° up from the ground to support the crossbar, was invented by Jim Trimble and Joel Rottman in Montreal, Quebec, Canada. The first ones were built by Alcan and displayed at the Expo 67 world's fair in Montreal. The NFL had standardized its goalposts in 1966 and adopted the slingshot for the 1967 season. The NCAA subsequently adopted the same rule, but later allowed the use of "offset" goalposts with the older two-post base. The CFL was the first league to use the slingshot goalposts. They debuted in the 2nd game of the CFL's Eastern Conference final in 1966 at Montreal's Autostade because Landsdowne Park (now TD Place Stadium), the home of Ottawa Rough Riders, was undergoing renovations. They were also used in the Grey Cup the next week at Vancouver's Empire Stadium. Three schools in Division I FBS currently use dual-support posts: Florida State, LSU, and Washington State. A special exemption was allowed by the NFL for the New Orleans Saints to use the offset goalposts during the 2005 season, when they used LSU's stadium for home games after Hurricane Katrina.

Goalposts at the professional level today are sometimes equipped with a video camera mounted to the stanchion immediately behind the center of the crossbar. Since these cameras are both above and slightly behind the crossbar, a field goal attempt will be judged good if it strikes this equipment.

A small plastic tee, which can be 1 to 2 inches (25–51 mm) high (smaller than the kickoff tee), may be used for field goals and extra points in some leagues, including US high schools and Canadian amateur play. The NFL (and most other professional leagues) has never allowed the use of tees for field goal kick attempts, having always required kickers to kick off the ground for such attempts (and for extra points; a rare exception for a U.S.-based pro league to allow the usage of such tees for such attempts was the original USFL in the 1980s). In 1948, the NCAA authorized the use of the small rubberized kicking tee for extra points and field goals, but banned them by 1989, requiring kicks from the ground, as in the NFL. The CFL allows the use of a tee for field goals and convert kicks, but it is optional.

During the 2011 NFL season, a record 90 field goals of 50 yards or longer were made. In 2012, this record was raised to 92 field goals of 50 yards or longer.

== Longest field goal records ==
=== NFL ===
- 68 yards, Cam Little, Jacksonville Jaguars vs. Las Vegas Raiders, November 2, 2025

=== NFL preseason ===
- 70 yards, Cam Little, Jacksonville Jaguars vs. Pittsburgh Steelers, August 9, 2025

=== CFL ===
- 63 yards: Paul McCallum, Saskatchewan Roughriders vs. Edmonton Eskimos, October 27, 2001

=== Professional spring football ===
- 64 yards, Jake Bates, Michigan Panthers vs. St. Louis Battlehawks, United Football League, March 30, 2024

=== College football ===
The following kicks were successful with the use of a kicking tee, which was banned by the NCAA after the 1988 season. Additionally, prior to 1991, the goal posts were 23 feet, 4 inches. They were narrowed to 18 feet, 6 inches in 1991.

Division	Distance	Kicker	Team	Opponent	Date	Notes
NAIA	69 yards	Ove Johansson	Abilene Christian	East Texas State	October 16, 1976	Overall field goal record with the use of a tee
Division I FBS	67 yards	Russell Erxleben	Texas	Rice	October 1, 1977	
Division I FBS	67 yards	Steve Little	Arkansas	Texas	October 15, 1977	
Division II	67 yards	Tom Odle	Fort Hays St	Washburn	November 5, 1988	
Division I FCS	63 yards	Scott Roper	Arkansas State	North Texas	November 7, 1987	
Division III	62 yards	Dom Antonini	Rowan	Salisbury	September 18, 1976	

After the 1988 season, the use of a kicking tee was banned. The following kicks were successful without the use of a tee.

Division	Distance	Kicker	Team	Opponent	Date	Notes
Division I FBS	65 yards	Martin Gramática	Kansas State	Northern Illinois	September 12, 1998	Overall NCAA field goal record without the use of a tee; also the longest field goal since the NCAA narrowed the goalposts in 1991
Division II	64 yards	Garrett Lindholm	Tarleton State	Texas A&M–Kingsville	November 14, 2009	The 64-yard field goal was made as time expired forcing overtime. Tarleton State went on to win the playoff game
Division I FCS	63 yards	Bill Gramática	South Florida	Austin Peay	November 18, 2000	
Division I FBS	63 yards	Kyle Konrardy	Iowa State	South Dakota	August 30, 2025	
Division III	62 yards	Matthew Aven	Claremont	Cal Lutheran	October 19, 2013	
NAIA	62 yards	Derek Doerfler	Baker	William Jewell	October 8, 2007	

The longest known drop-kicked field goal in college football was a 62-yard kick from Pat O'Dea, an Australian kicker who played for Wisconsin. O'Dea's kick took place in a blizzard against Northwestern on November 15, 1898.

=== U Sports ===
The longest field goal in U Sports football history is 59 yards by Niko Difonte of Calgary Dinos playing against the UBC Thunderbirds on November 11, 2017. The field goal was the final and winning play of the 81st Hardy Cup.

=== High school ===
- 68 yards, Dirk Borgognone, Reno High School vs. Sparks High School (Nevada), September 27, 1985

=== Independent amateur ===
- 68 yards, Fabrizio Scaccia, Treasure Coast Bobcats (FL), March 29, 2009

=== Independent Women's Football League ===
- 44 yards, Sarah Oliver, California Quake vs. New Mexico Menace, April 26, 2008

== Longest missed field goal return records ==
=== CFL ===
Because the goalposts in Canadian football are on the goal line, and because downing the ball in the end zone results in the kicking team scoring a single point, field goal returns are much more common. The longest missed field goal return in the CFL is 131 total yards. Against the Montreal Alouettes on August 22, 1958, the Toronto Argonauts' Boyd Carter ran 15 yards, then threw a lateral to Dave Mann, who then returned it for the final 116 yards. This return, which started 21 yards behind the goal line, was during the era of 25-yard end zones (which made the maximum theoretical missed field return distance 134 yards in those days) and therefore cannot be met or exceeded on the modern field with 20-yard end zones. Since the shortening of the end zones in the CFL in 1986, a field goal has been returned for the maximum 129 yards on four occasions: by Bashir Levingston of the Toronto Argonauts on June 28, 2007, by Dominique Dorsey also of the Toronto Argonauts on August 2, 2007, by Tristan Jackson of the Saskatchewan Roughriders on July 14, 2012, and by Trent Guy of the Montreal Alouettes on September 23, 2012.

=== NCAA ===
In NCAA college football, only five missed field goals returns for touchdowns have ever been returned 100 yards or more:

- September 17, 1966: Don Guest (California Golden Bears), 108-yard return for a touchdown after a failed 47-yard field goal attempt by Washington State.
- September 28, 1968: Richie Luzzi (Clemson Tigers), 108-yard return for a touchdown after a failed 47-yard field goal attempt by Georgia.
- September 7, 2013: Odell Beckham Jr. (LSU Tigers), 109-yard return for a touchdown after a failed 59-yard field goal attempt by UAB.
- November 30, 2013: Chris Davis (Auburn Tigers), 109-yard return for a game winning touchdown after a failed 57-yard field goal attempt also for the win by Alabama. This play is also known as "the Kick Six".
- September 3, 2016: Brandon Wilson (Houston Cougars), 109-yard return for a touchdown after a failed 53-yard field goal attempt by Oklahoma.
- October 17, 2026: Jackson Williams (NDSU Bison), 107-yard return for a touchdown after a failed 57-yard field goal attempt by Nevada.
- October 31, 2026: Xayvion Turner-Bradshaw (Marshall Thundering Herd), 100-yard return for a touchdown after a failed 55-yard field goal attempt by Old Dominion.

=== U Sports ===
In U Sports football, like in the CFL, the longest possible missed field goal return is 129 yards, and this has occurred three times.

- Jeremy Botelho of the Manitoba Bisons playing against the Simon Fraser Clansmen on September 11, 2009
- Jedd Gardner of the Guelph Gryphons playing against the McMaster Marauders on October 8, 2010
- Tunde Adeleke of the Carleton Ravens playing against the Ottawa Gee-Gees on October 5, 2013

== See also ==
- Double Doink
- Most accurate kickers in NFL history
