= Chopping Block =

Chopping Block may refer to:

- The Chopping Block, an Australian reality TV series
- The Chopping Block (American TV series)
- The Chopping Block (Washington), a mountain summit
- Butcher block, or butcher's block, a heavy-duty chopping block

== See also ==
- Chop block (disambiguation)
