= Everett Memorial Stadium =

Stadium complex for football and baseball in Everett, Washington

Coordinates: 47.967°N 122.203°W

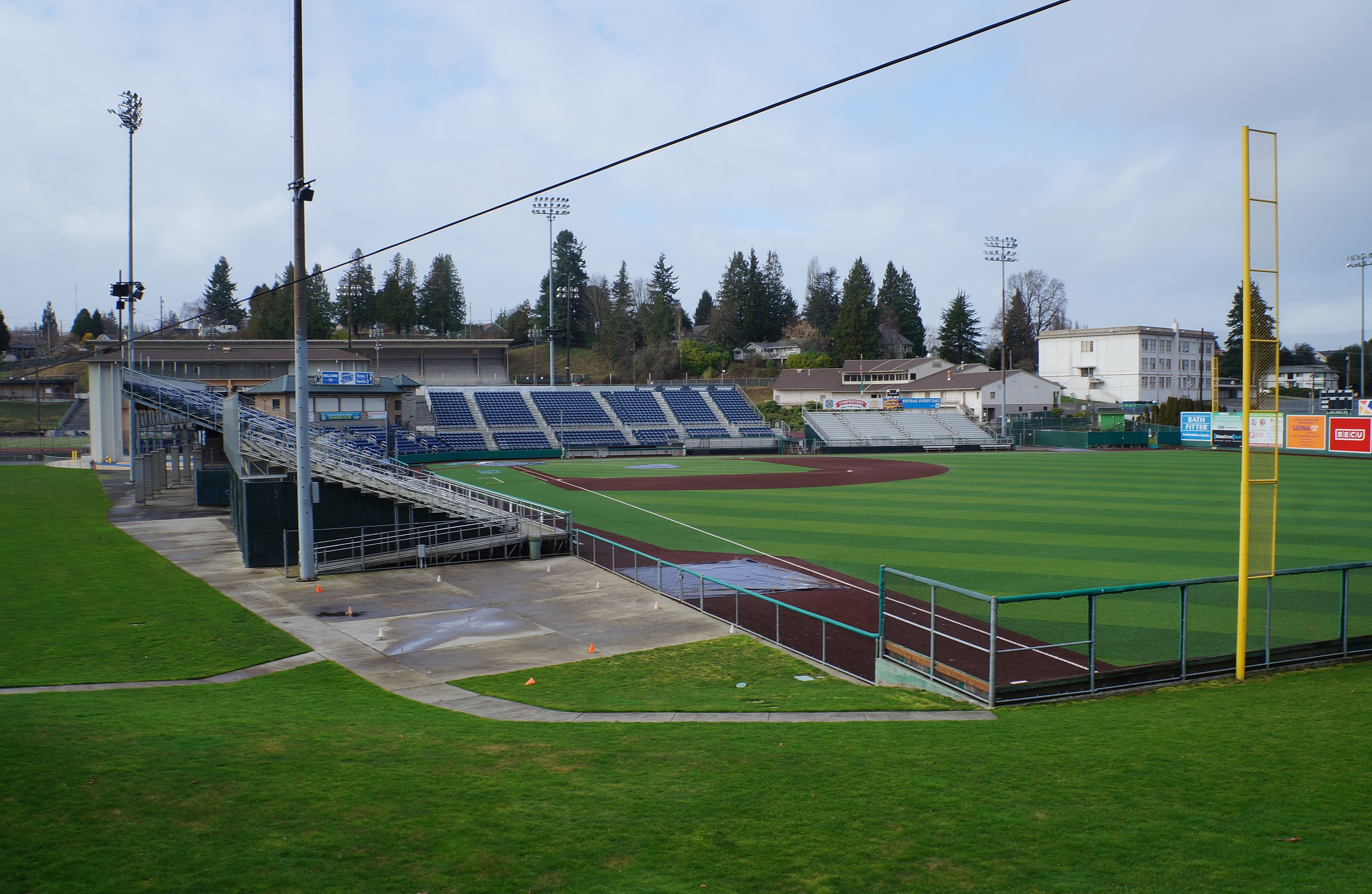
- The baseball field in 2021

- Location within Washington State Location within the United States
- Location: 3900 Broadway; Everett, Washington; United States
- Owner: Everett School District
- Operator: Everett School District
- Capacity: Baseball: 3,682; Football: 12,000
- Surface: Artificial turf
- Field size: Left Field: 330 ft (101 m); Center Field: 395 ft (120 m); Right Field: 330 ft (101 m)
- Acreage: 20 acres (8.1 ha)

Construction
- Opened: 1947 (79 years ago)
- Expanded: 1998

Tenants
- Everett AquaSox (NWL), 1995–present Everett Giants (NWL), 1984–1994; Seattle Spartans (WFA), 2013–present Everett BigFoot (USISL Pro), 1995–1996

Everett Memorial Stadium is an outdoor sports complex in Everett, Washington, which includes a stadium for football, soccer, and track and field and a baseball park. Opened in 1947, it has been the home field of the Everett AquaSox, a Minor League Baseball team in the Northwest League, and its predecessor, the Everett Giants, since 1984. In 2019, the ballpark became known as Funko Field. The football stadium has been home to the Everett Reign, a women's football team, since 2013. The complex is owned by the Everett School District, whose schools use both stadiums for their athletic programs. It is also home to the Puget Sound Festival of Bands, an annual marching band competition. The facility was remodeled in 1998 to have a seating capacity of 3,682 people for baseball and 12,000 for football.

== Main stadium ==
The stadium sits on land donated by the Everett Lodge of Elks 479 to the Everett School District in 1947, dedicated in memory of Everett citizens who died during military service in World War II. On July 9, 1967, a Canadian Football League preseason game between the BC Lions and Edmonton Eskimos was played at Memorial Stadium. It started 45 minutes late due to issues with Edmonton's aircraft prior to their arrival at Paine Field. The Lions won 7–2, with no touchdowns scored by either team, in front of 6,248 spectators.

The first professional soccer team to play at the stadium were the Seattle Sounders of the North American Soccer League. They played an exhibition match against the Los Angeles Aztecs on April 5, 1975, that drew 6,614 spectators. Defender Bernie Fagan scored the lone goal of the match, which ended in a 1–0 victory for the Sounders.

The track stadium was renovated in 2022 and reopened with a new surface and track.

== Baseball stadium ==
The first professional team to play at the ballpark were the Everett Giants, playing in the Northwest League of Class A baseball. The first Giants game held at the stadium was played against the Bellingham Mariners in front of a crowd of 3,527 on June 19, 1984. As the stadium itself dates to 1947, it is one of the oldest active ballparks in Minor League Baseball. On June 17, 1987, with 3,122 fans watching, Ken Griffey Jr., playing for the Bellingham Mariners, hit his first professional home run over the left field wall, with the ball landing in the street approximately 387 feet (118 m) from home plate. A plaque on the sidewalk marks the site just outside the left field wall.

The baseball stadium underwent extensive renovations in 1998, at a cost of $5 million. The upgrade increased capacity by 1,400 seats to the present 3,682 and added a larger concession area and new lighting. The renovation was funded by a motel-hotel tax approved by the Washington State Legislature in 1994. The Seattle University Redhawks baseball team played at Memorial Stadium in 2012 and 2013.

On October 17, 2017, citing the poor condition of the field's natural grass surface when the stadium was used by the Everett High School and Everett Community College baseball teams, which rendered the field near-unusable for games played by both schools, the natural grass field was switched to an artificial surface. Work began on October 31, 2017, and was completed in April 2018. At the time of the switch, it was one of three ballparks in the Northwest League to have an artificial turf field. The Eugene Emeralds' PK Park and the Hillsboro Hops' Ron Tonkin Field were the others.

On March 19, 2019, the Everett School Board approved a $1.1 million, eight-year sponsorship agreement with local toymaker Funko to brand the baseball field as Funko Field at Everett Memorial Stadium.

The stadium's parking lot was home to a temporary COVID-19 testing center during the COVID-19 pandemic. The testing center, operated by the Snohomish Health District, opened on March 23 and closed on April 16 after processing 2,500 people.

=== Planned replacement ===
The county and city government approved the development of a feasibility study that would investigate whether a new multipurpose stadium could be built in Everett to replace Funko Field. The study was spurred by updated Minor League Baseball standards and the AquaSox moving to the High-A level and playing more games each season. A site next to Angel of the Winds Arena in downtown Everett was selected for the study; other proposed sites included the Everett Mall, Kasch Park, and a city-owned lot near Interstate 5.

The Everett City Council selected the downtown Everett site on December 18, 2024. The site could also host a United Soccer League team. The site is between Pacific and Hewitt avenues on the east side of Broadway. The stadium is estimated to cost a minimum of $102 million, most of which would come from public funding sources, including government grants and bonds. The stadium could open for the 2027 baseball season.
