= Southern California Breakers =

- Founded: 2005
- League: Independent Women's Football League
- Team history: Orange County Breakers (NWFA) (2005-2007); Southern California Breakers (IWFL) (2008-present)
- Based in: Orange County, California
- Stadium: Fullerton Union High School
- Colors: black, blue, white
- Owner: Monique Boone
- Head coach: No Coach
- Championships: 0

The Southern California Breakers were a football team in the Independent Women's Football League based in Orange County, California. Home games were played on the campus of Fullerton Union High School.

For their first three seasons, the Breakers were called the Orange County Breakers and played in the National Women's Football Association.

== Season-by-season ==
Season records
Season	W	L	T	Finish	Playoff results
Orange County Breakers (NWFA)
2005	X-Team: Results Unknown/Not Counted				
2006	8	0	0	1st Western Conference	--
2007	5	3	0	2nd Western Conference	--
Southern California Breakers (IWFL)
2008	4	4	0	3rd Tier I West Pacific Southwest	--
2009	4	4	0	12th Tier II	--
2010*	1	7	0	3rd Tier II West Pacific West	--
Totals	22	18	0		

* = Current Standing

== Season schedule ==
=== 2011 ===
Date	Opponent	Home/Away	Result
April 9	Desert Fire Cats	Home	NA
April 16	Modesto Maniax	Home	Lost
April 23	California Quake	Home	Lost
April 30	Portland Shockwave	Away	Lost
May 14	Modesto Maniax	Away	Lost
May 21	Palm Springs Desert Fire Cats	Away	Lost
May 28	California Quake	Away	Lost
June 11	Tucson Monsoon	Home	Lost

=== 2010 ===
Date	Opponent	Home/Away	Result
April 3	Tucson Monsoon	Away	Lost 0-3
April 10	So Cal Scorpions	Home	Lost 0-22
April 17	Bay Area Bandits	Home	Lost 7-42
April 24	Modesto Maniax	Away	Lost
May 1	Bay Area Bandits	Away	Lost
May 8	Tucson Monsoon	Home	Won
May 22	California Quake	Home	Lost
June 5	Los Angeles Amazons	Away	Lost
