= Rose City Wildcats =

- Founded: 2010
- Folded: 2010
- League: Women's Spring Football League
- Team history: Rose City Wildcats
- Based in: Portland, Oregon
- Stadium: TBD
- Colors: Sky blue, black, white
- Championships: 0

The Rose City Wildcats were a women's professional American football team based in Portland, Oregon. A member of the Women's Spring Football League, the Wildcats were planning on playing in the league's second season in 2011.

The Wildcats are named to honor (though not a continuation of) a team which played in the Women's American Football League for the 2001 season, finishing 0-7 before shutting down.
