= Alabama Slammers (Women's American Football League) =

Defunct Women's American Football League

Alabama Slammers was the name for a team in the Women's American Football League which played in the 2001–2002 season. They used both Guy Tucker Field in Birmingham, Alabama, and Max Luther Field in Huntsville, Alabama, as their home stadiums. The team was owned by Lloyd Leslie and had Mark Leslie as the head coach. They completed the reason with a 2–7 record, winning one game by forfeit.

== Season-by-season ==
Season records
Season	W	L	T	Finish	Playoff results
2001	2	7	0	2nd Atlantic Central	--
Totals	2	7	0		
