= Seattle Warbirds =

Team in the Women's Football Alliance

- Founded: 2001
- League: WAFL (2001)
- Team history: Seattle Warbirds (2001)
- Based in: Seattle, Washington
- Colors: Garnet, gold, white

The Seattle Warbirds were a women's professional American football team based in Seattle, Washington. The team owner Jennifer Stuart got the idea from local Simi Pro teams she had witnessed and asked her father Michael Stuart to check into it.

The result, they were founded by head coach Michael Stuart and general manager and assistant coach Joshua Creel in February 2001 in the newWomen's American Football League. The team had tryouts in May 2001 at Lake Washington High School on too consecutive weekends. 308 women tried out the team. Workouts began and 308 dropped to 250 dropped to 75 in four weeks. Practice began that number was reduced to 50 as the final team. Reserve players (20) on standby to replace injuries and any quitters. This team had not one quitter at home or on the road we played always with 50 players coach Stuart reported with team rosters.

The Warbirds played away games in Portland, San Francisco (old Kisar Stadium field), Oakland, Sacramento. All away trips were driven in rental vans from Enterprise. (Known to team members as the 5 vans of victory)

Away Game procedure

Friday drive to the game location,

Friday night (curfew)

Saturday team breakfast / meeting,

Saturday Game, under the lights

Saturday after game (50) wild Warbird women unleashed

Sunday Breakfast check/out 30 rooms an entire floor

Sunday all the way, as long as it takes back to Seattle.

Season 10 Game Week Schedule

Monday night, game film meetings at the high school.

Tuesday Night, Practice

Thursday Night, Practice

Commitment / Obligation Each Player

Before season ramp up 5 days

Season Home Game Week 5 day

Season Away Game week 6 day

We played the Hawaii Legions in the same week at home. We played game 1 on Saturday and again the following Thursday. The Legions team stayed here in the lower 48. Some of their ladies staying with some of our Warbird players and others had relatives here along the west coast states,

The Warbirds only played in the 2001 WAFL season, finishing 9–0–1 in January 2002 and winning the Pacific Northwest Division title before losing at home at Juanita High school to the Arizona Caliente in the Pacific Conference semifinals. The next season, the WAFL disbanded and most of the team players left to join and form the Tacoma Majestics in the Independent Women's Football League (IWFL). The Warbirds did not merge with other area teams. They officially disbanded in March 2002.

Ten years later, the Warbirds announced they would return to play in the Women's Football Alliance (WFA) for the 2011 season. However, the team would never play a game in the WFA.
