= Women's American Football League =

The Women's American Football League (WAFL) was a women's American football league that was formed in 2001. After disbanding, the teams merged with the Women's Affiliated Football Conference (WAFC), the Independent Women's Football League (IWFL), Women's Football Association (WFA), and the American Football Women's League (AFWL), itself now disbanded.

== Teams ==
There were 24 teams in the league.

- Arizona Caliente WPFL
- Alabama Slammers
- Baton Rouge Wildcats IWFL
- Orlando Fire
- California Quake IWFL
- Hawaii Legends
- San Diego Sunfire
- SF Tsunami
- Oakland Banshees IWFL
- Orlando Mayhem IWFL
- Tampa Bay Force
- Jacksonville Dixie Blues
- New Orleans Voodoo Dolls
- Indianapolis Vipers
- Rose City Wildcats
- Seattle Warbirds
- Sacramento Sirens IWFL
- LA Lasers
- Minnesota Vixens (Exhibition) WPFL

== Women's World Bowl ==
Season Champion Score Runner-Up

- 2001–02 California Quake 30–14 Jacksonville Dixie Blues
- 2002–03 Jacksonville Dixie Blues 68–20 Indianapolis Vipers

== See also ==
- Women's Professional Football League (WPFL)
- Women's football in the United States
- Women's American football
- List of leagues of American football
- Legends Football League
