= Modesto Maniax =

- Founded: 2009
- League: Independent Women's Football League
- Team history: Modesto Maniax (2009-present)
- Based in: Modesto, California
- Stadium: Modesto Christian School
- Colors: red, white, blue
- Owner: Dineen Goodwin
- Head coach: Jeff Watson
- Championships: 0
- Mascot: Maxxy

The Modesto Maniax are a football team in the Independent Women's Football League based in Modesto, California. Home games are played on the campus of Modesto Christian School.

Two of the team's players were featured on CNN's Larry King Live in 2010, one of King's last shows.

== Season-by-season ==
Season records
Season	W	L	T	Finish	Playoff results
2009	0	8	0	24th Tier II	--
2010*	0	1	0	4th Tier II West Pacific West	--
Totals	0	9	0		

* = Current Standing

== Season Schedules ==
=== 2009 ===
Date	Opponent	Home/Away	Result
April 11	Sacramento Sirens	Home	Lost 0-71
April 25	Tucson Monsoon	Home	Lost 8-12
May 2	Southern California Breakers	Away	Lost 0-55
May 9	Los Angeles Amazons	Away	Lost 0-64
May 23	California Quake	Away	Lost 24-58
May 30	California Quake	Home	Lost 14-42
June 6	Corvallis Pride	Home	Lost 8-20
June 13	Southern California Breakers	Home	Lost 6-21

=== 2010 ===
Date	Opponent	Home/Away	Result
April 17	Portland Shockwave	Home	Lost 8-22
April 24	Southern California Breakers	Home	
May 1	Sacramento Sirens	Home	
May 8	California Quake	Away	
May 15	Sacramento Sirens	Home	
May 22	Bay Area Bandits	Away	
May 22	Seattle Majestics	Away	
June 5	Sacramento Sirens	Away	
