= Field goal range =

Part of an American football field

Field goal range is the part of the field in American football where there is a good chance that a field goal attempt will be successful.

A field goal is normally 17 or 18 yards (7 or 8 yards in Canadian football) longer than the distance of the line of scrimmage to the goal line, as it includes the end zone (10 yards) and 7 or 8 yards to where the holder places the ball. In Canadian football, the goal posts are on the goal lines, in front of the end zones. Therefore, if the line of scrimmage is at the 30, the field goal would be 47 or 48 yards (in American football) or 37 or 38 yards (in Canadian football). Each team has a different field goal range, depending on the preferences and performance of its kicker; professional teams with highly elite kickers may consider themselves to be in field goal range when the line of scrimmage is at their opponents' 35-yard line or even further, while teams with less elite kickers may not consider attempting a field goal unless they are inside the 25-yard line of their opponent.

From 1932 to 1974 the field goal in the NFL was located at the goal line, similar to Canadian football, so only 7 or 8 yards was added to the distance from the line of scrimmage.

== Average field goal range ==
The exact field goal range varies for each team, depending on the ability of the team's placekicker. While some weaker placekickers may have trouble kicking field goals longer than 45 yards (making field goals from beyond the 28 difficult), others may consistently make 50-yarders, making it practical to kick from beyond the 33. For most NFL kickers, the 38-yard line is typically the limit of their field goal range (since the ball is kicked 7 yards behind the line of scrimmage and 10 yards back into the endzone where the goal posts are located, making the typical limit a 55-yard field goal). Weather conditions, particularly wind, also have a significant impact on field goal range; kicking with the wind at the kicker's back significantly increases field goal range, while kicking against the wind or with a stiff crosswind will greatly reduce the kicker's effective range, while generally there is no advantage beyond assured targeting of a kick if a game is being played indoors. Heavy snowfall can greatly reduce field goal range, both by weighing the ball down and by making it more difficult to get a secure spotting of the ball or sufficient momentum in the run-up. Altitude also affects kicking range; both the longest punt in NFL history and three of the four longest field goals in NFL history took place in Denver, Colorado, which is more than 3,000 feet (910 m) higher in elevation than the next-highest NFL city (the Las Vegas suburb of Paradise, Nevada). From the 1970s through the 1990s, artificial turf improved a kicker's field goal range by having less friction during the kick; one of the reasons Scott Norwood missed the game-winning kick in Super Bowl XXV was that he kicked on artificial turf in Buffalo and struggled with longer field goals on natural grass throughout his career, and Super Bowl XXV was played on a grass surface. Modern artificial turf, which has similar depth and characteristics to natural grass, does not have an appreciable effect on kicking range.

In high school football, players are permitted to kick off special flat-kicking tees up to two inches high. The NCAA banned the use of kicking tees in 1989. Most of the longer-range field goals in NCAA history were kicked prior to the elimination of tees; the use of tees allowed the ball to be elevated out of the field's grass or turf, reducing friction in the opening milliseconds of the kick and allowing for longer kicks.

== Kicking versus punting ==
If a kicker is outside of field goal range, teams will generally punt. However, punting too close to the end zone increases the risk of a touchback, which nullifies most of the effect of the punt. Thus, teams who face a fourth down between the 35 and 40 yard lines (closer in a crosswind) often will go for the more risky fourth down conversion rather than risk either the touchback or the missed field goal.

== Record holders ==
The longest field goal in recorded football history is 70 yards, set by Cam Little of the Jacksonville Jaguars in an NFL preseason game on August 9, 2025. The longest successful field goal in the NFL (which does not count preseason games in its official records) was 68 yards, also completed by Little in 2025. The college football record is 69 yards, set by Swedish kicker Ove Johansson in an NAIA game in 1976. NCAA record is 67 yards held by 3 kickers, Russell Erxleben of Texas, Steve Little (no known relation to Cam Little) of Arkansas and Joe Williams of Wichita State University. All three of those kickers achieved that feat in the 1977-1978 college seasons. Notably, none of the three, Johansson, Erxleben nor Steve Little; were able to match their success in the NFL: Johansson and Erxleben suffered injuries, and Erxleben played primarily as a punter. Steve Little's career, which suffered from inconsistency in the two years he was able to play, was derailed by a car accident that left him quadriplegic.

The CFL record is 62 yards held by Paul McCallum, the non-NFL professional record 64 yards by Jake Bates, the independent amateur record is 68 yards held by Fabrizio Scaccia, and the high school record 68 yards held by Dirk Borgognone; high school has wider goal posts and treats a field goal attempt that lands short in the field of play the same as a punt, making longer attempts much less risky. The indoor football record, with narrower and higher goal posts, is 63 yards (set by Aaron Mills), which is practically as long of a field goal as is possible in that variant of the sport, since the field in indoor football (including both end zones) is only 66 yards. Scaccia, while playing indoor football, attempted a 64-yard kick that was inches short of success, hitting the crossbar. Longer field goals have been attempted at times; the longest attempt in the NFL, which was well short and was kicked into the wind, was 76 yards, attempted by Sebastian Janikowski of the Oakland Raiders, in a September 28, 2008 game against the San Diego Chargers.

NFL Europe rewarded kickers that successfully kicked a field goal of longer than 50 yards with a bonus point, making such field goals worth 4 points instead of 3; this rule was later adopted by the Stars Football League and, in a modified form, the current incarnation of the United Football League, which increased the required distance to 60 yards or more.

The shortest possible field goal under current strategies is slightly over 17 yards in American football and 8 yards in Canadian football (Canadian football requires the ball to be snapped at least one yard away from the end zone). Theoretically, a field goal could be attempted from a shorter distance as long as the holder stays behind the line of scrimmage (or via a drop kick at any point on the field), but in practice this has never happened.

== Drop kicks ==
It has been surmised that a drop kick has a slightly longer range than the standard place kick, but since these kicks are so rare, that is not known for sure. During the early NFL era, this was generally true, and drop kicks were the norm for longer field goals; in fact, the first unofficial NFL record kick of 55 yards, set by Paddy Driscoll in 1924, was indeed set by drop kick. The football was shaped differently in that era, being changed to its modern, more narrow shape in 1935, so it is not reasonable to compare field goals from that era with the modern era, any more than it is reasonable to compare a kick with a rugby ball with an American football today. Further complicating any comparisons is that statistics reporting during the era of the round-ended ball was inconsistent and lacked any central authority or standardization; newspapers reported Driscoll's field goal as variously being 50, 52 or 55 yards, and are also inconsistent as to whether the kick was by drop kick or place kick. Driscoll also kicked a reported 50-yard drop kick in 1925 (newspaper reports were again inconsistent) and is the only known example of a kicker to have done so from that distance.

The only successful drop kick in the NFL since the 1941 NFL Championship Game was by Doug Flutie, the backup quarterback of the New England Patriots, against the Miami Dolphins on January 1, 2006, for an extra point after a touchdown. Flutie had estimated "an 80 percent chance" of making the drop kick, which was called to give Flutie, 43 at the time, the opportunity to make a historic kick in his final NFL game, the drop kick being his last play in the NFL. After the game, New England coach Bill Belichick said, "I think Doug deserves it," and Flutie said, "I just thanked him for the opportunity." The kick was executed from 27 yards out (Flutie stood in a punter position, 15 yards behind the line of scrimmage). Drew Brees, a former teammate of Flutie's, attempted a drop-kicked extra point from the same position during the poorly received 2012 Pro Bowl; his kick, however, fell short.
