= New Mexico Menace =

- Founded: 2008
- League: Independent Women's Football League
- Team history: 2008-2009
- Based in: Albuquerque, New Mexico
- Stadium: Wilson Stadium, Albuquerque High School
- Colors: black, red, white
- Championships: 0

The New Mexico Menace is a football team in the Independent Women's Football League based in Albuquerque, New Mexico. Home games are played at Wilson Stadium on the campus of Albuquerque High School.

After completing three-quarters of their 2009 schedule, their season ended abruptly. It was determined by team leadership that they should concentrate on the 2010 season.

== Season-by-season ==
Season records
| Season | W | L | T | Finish | Playoff results |
|---|---|---|---|---|---|
New Mexico Menace (IWFL)
| 2008 | 0 | 8 | 0 | 5th Tier I West Pacific Southwest | -- |
| 2009 | 0 | 6 | 0 | 25th Tier II | -- |
| Totals | 0 | 14 | 0 | | |

== 2009 season schedule ==
| Date | Opponent | Home/Away | Result |
|---|---|---|---|
| April 11 | Tucson Monsoon | Away | Lost 0-8 |
| April 18 | Southern California Breakers | Home | Lost 0-33 |
| April 25 | California Quake | Away | Lost 0-61 |
| May 2 | Tucson Monsoon | Home | Lost 0-54 |
| May 16 | Los Angeles Amazons | Away | Lost 0-50 |
| May 23 | Tucson Monsoon | Home | Lost 7-55 |
