= California Quake =

Former women's American football team

- Founded: 2001
- League: Independent Women's Football League
- Team history: WAFL (2001); WAFC (2002); IWFL (2003-2015)
- Based in: Carson/Long Beach/Los Angeles/Lynwood, California
- Stadium: Football Stadium
- Colors: black, yellow, white
- Owner: Catherine B. Vivo
- Head coach: Timothy Holmes Sr
- Championships: 1 (WAFL: 2001)
- Dancers: Quakettes

The California Quake was a women's professional tackle football team based in Los Angeles County, California. The Quake played for 13 seasons in the Western Conference of the Independent Women's Football League. Home games were played at Carson High School. The 2008 season brought new ownership to the Quake; now owned by longtime veteran player, Catherine B. Vivo.

During the California Quake vs New Mexico Menace game on May 24, 2008, kicker Sarah "Ollie" Oliver broke a women's tackle football record by successfully kicking a 44-yard field goal.

On June 7, 2008, the California Quake defeated the New Mexico Menace 35–0, finishing the 2008 regular season undefeated and on top of the Tier 1 Pacific Southwest Division.

== Season-by-season ==
Season records
Season	W	L	T	Finish	Playoff results
California Quake (WAFL)
2001	11	2	0	1st Pacific South	Won Pacific Conference Semifinal (Sacramento); Won Pacific Conference Championship (Arizona); Won WAFL Championship (Jacksonville)
California Quake (WAFC)
2002	5	5	0	3rd Southern	--
California Quake (IWFL)
2003	3	5	0	3rd Western Pacific Southwest	--
2004	0	8	0	3rd Western Pacific Southwest	--
2005	6	3	1	3rd Western Pacific Southwest	--
2006	4	4	0	3rd Western Pacific Southwest	--
2007	3	5	0	3rd Western Pacific Southwest	--
2008	8	1	0	1st Western Pacific Southwest	Lost Western Conference Semifinal (Dallas)
2009	4	4	0	3rd Western Pacific Southwest	--
2010	7	2	0	4th Western Pacific West	--
2011	10	1	0	1st Western Pacific Southwest	Won Western Conference Semifinal (Sacramento); Won Western Conference Championship (Wisconsin); Lost IWFL Championship (Atlanta)
2012	3	6	0	2nd Western Pacific Southwest	Lost Founders Bowl Quarterfinal (Portland)
2013	3	5	0	--	Lost Western Conference Semifinal (Phoenix Phantomz)
2014	5	2	0	2nd Western Pacific West	--
2015	1	6	0	5th Western Pacific West	--
Totals	73	59	1	(including playoffs)	

== Season Schedules ==
=== 2009 ===
Date	Opponent	Home/Away	Result
April 11	Los Angeles Amazons	Home	Lost 2-32
April 18	Sacramento Sirens	Away	Lost 0-46
April 25	New Mexico Menace	Away	Won 61-0
May 2	Los Angeles Amazons	Away	Lost 21-36
May 9	Sacramento Sirens	Home	Lost 14-24
May 23	Modesto Maniax	Home	Won 58-24
May 30	Modesto Maniax	Away	Won 42-14
June 6	Southern California Breakers	Away	Won 26-20

=== 2010 ===
Date	Opponent	Home/Away	Result
April 3	Seattle Majestics	Home	Won 50-14
April 10	Tucson Monsoon	Away	Won 60-20
April 17	Los Angeles Amazons	Home	Lost 36-48
April 24	So Cal Scorpions	Home	Won 42-40
May 1	Tucson Monsoon	Away	Won 40-8
May 8	Modesto Maniax	Home	Won 62-0
May 22	Southern California Breakers	Away	Won 34-14
June 5	Portland Shockwave	Away	Lost 6-7
