= Madison Cougars =

- Founded: 2010
- League: Independent Women's Football League
- Team history: Madison Cougars (2011-2012)
- Based in: Middleton, Wisconsin
- Stadium: Breitenbach Stadium, Middleton High School
- Colors: Red, black, white
- Owner: Andre Green & Kenny Gales
- Championships: 0

The Madison Cougars were a team in the Independent Women's Football League that began their first season of play in 2011. Based in Madison, Wisconsin, home games were played at Breitenbach Stadium on the campus of Middleton High School in nearby Middleton.

== Season-by-season ==
Season records
Season	W	L	T	Finish	Playoff results
2011	--	--	--	--	--
