= Seattle Majestics =

Women's American football team

- Founded: 2002
- League: WNFC (2019-Present), WFA (2013–2017) IWFL (2018)
- Team history: Tacoma Majestics (2003–2005); Seattle Majestics (2006–present)
- Based in: Kent, Washington
- Stadium: French Field
- Colors: Navy, gray, neon green
- CEO: Alicia Gelles
- Head coach: Joey Martinez
- Mascot: Lena the lion

The Seattle Majestics are a women's American football team based in the Seattle metropolitan area that competes in the Women's National Football Conference (WNFC) as a member of the Northwest Division. The team plays its home games at French Field on the campus of Kent-Meridian High School in Kent, Washington.

The team began as the Tacoma Majestics in 2002 before moving to Seattle in 2006 and merging with the former Women's American Football League franchise, the Seattle Warbirds.

The franchise is currently a 501c3 and operated by the Board of Directors. Sponsorships and fundraising under the team's nonprofit 501(c)(3) status provide finances for the team, but players also have to contribute.

The Seattle Majestics have won the WFA's Pacific Northwest Division title four times, 2013, 2014, 2015, and 2016. The Seattle Majestics also won the IWFL's Northwest Division title six times, from 2003 to 2005 and again from 2007 from 2009. The team has also had the distinction of entertaining the crowd at Qwest Field prior to the kickoff of the Seattle Seahawks and has been featured on ESPN. After the conclusion of the 2017 season, the Seattle Majestics moved back to the IWFL. In the summer of 2019, the Seattle Majestics joined forces with the Texas Elite Spartans, San Diego Surge, and Utah Falconz to form the foundation of the WNFC. The Majestics just finished their 6th season in the WNFC, as of 2025, and have a combined record of 17-22-1 since moving over to the WNFC.

== Season-by-season ==
Season records
Season	W	L	T	Finish	Playoff results
Tacoma Majestics (IWFL)
2003	7	1	0	1st WC Pacific Northwest	Lost Western Conference Qualifier (Sacramento)
2004	8	0	0	1st WC Pacific Northwest	Lost Western Conference Qualifier (Sacramento)
2005	9	1	0	1st WC Pacific Northwest	Won Western Conference Qualifier (Chicago); Lost Western Conference Championship (Sacramento)
Seattle Majestics (IWFL)
2006	5	3	0	2nd WC Pacific Northwest	--
2007	8	0	0	1st WC Pacific Northwest	Lost Western Conference Qualifier (Sacramento)
2008	8	0	0	1st Tier I WC Pacific Northwest	Won Western Conference Semifinal (Corvallis); Lost Western Conference Championship (Dallas)
2009	8	0	0	1st Tier 1 WC Pacific Northwest	Lost Western Conference Semifinal (Chicago)
2010	2	6	0	6th Tier 1 WC Pacific West	--
2011	4	4	0	2nd Tier 1 WC Pacific West	Won Tier II Western Conference Semifinal (Madison); Won Tier II Western Conference Championship (Modesto); Won Tier II Championship (New England)
2012	6	2	0	1st Tier 1 WC Pacific West	Lost Western Conference Semifinal (Sacramento)
Seattle Majestics (WFA)
2013	8	0	0	1st Northwest Division	--
2014	7	1	0	1st Northwest Division	Lost American Conference Semifinal (San Diego Surge)
2015	8	0	0	1st Northwest Division	Lost American Conference Semifinal (San Diego Surge)
2016	6	2	0	2nd Northwest Division	
2017	7	1	0	1st Northwest Division	Tied for 1st Place in the Division
Seattle Majestics (IWFL)
2018	5	1	0	2nd Pacific Division	Finished 0-2 in Best of The West Tournament (Las Vegas, NV)
Seattle Majestics (WNFC)
2019	4	1	1	2nd Pacific Division	Lost in Pacific Conference Championship (Utah Falconz)
2020	0	0	0	Did Not Play	*SEASON CANCELLED DUE TO COVID*
2021	2	4	0	6th Pacific Division	
2022	1	5	0	7th Pacific Division	
2023	1	5	0	6th Pacific Division	
2024	4	3	0	2nd Pacific Division	Lost in Quarterfinals to Texas Spartans
2025	4	3	0	2nd Pacific Division	Lost in Quarterfinals to Texas Spartans
Totals	122	43	1	(including playoffs)	
