= Cut blocking =

Offensive line technique

In gridiron football, cut blocking is an offensive line technique that consists of an offensive player knocking a defensive player down by hitting his knees. The technique, which was initially instilled by Bobb McKittrick, the offensive line coach of the San Francisco 49ers from 1979 to 1999, is often criticized as being "dirty." Additionally, it is illegal for an offensive player to "cut" a defensive player already engaged with another offensive player. This is considered a "chop block", not a cut block. In the NCAA, cut blocking is allowed as long as the block is away from the original position of the ball. The Fall Experimental Football League and the NFL banned use of the chop block but the cut block remains a legal block in the NFL.

== Use in the NFL ==
McKittrick was credited as the first to implement cut blocking in his offensive line schemes as the offensive line coach of the 49ers. Les Steckel, the offensive line coach for the Houston Oilers from 1995 to 1999, used cut blocking techniques. Mike Shanahan, the 49ers' offensive coordinator from 1992 to 1994, became the Denver Broncos' head coach in 1995, and brought Alex Gibbs along to become his offensive line coach. In the span from 1995 to 2003 in which Gibbs coached the team's offensive line and implemented the cut blocking technique, the Broncos won two Super Bowls (XXXII and XXXIII). Shanahan remained the Broncos' head coach until 2008, and Gibbs was hired by the Atlanta Falcons in 2004. He implemented the technique in his three seasons with the Falcons before he was hired by Gary Kubiak, the offensive coordinator of the Broncos in his time there, to become the offensive line coach of the Houston Texans in 2008.

In a Monday Night Football game between the Broncos and Cincinnati Bengals on October 25, 2004, offensive tackle George Foster of the Broncos legally used a cut block on defensive tackle Tony Williams of the Bengals, which resulted in a dislocation and fracture of Williams' ankle. On another Monday Night Football game between the New York Jets and Buffalo Bills on September 11, 2023, the Jets' Duane Brown used a cut block on the Bills' Leonard Floyd, but Floyd was able to jump over the block and sacked quarterback Aaron Rodgers, which resulted in a tear to Rodgers' Achilles and ending his season just four plays in.

== See also ==
- Zone blocking
- Glossary of American football
