= Chop block (gridiron football) =

Gridiron football term

In gridiron football, a chop block is an attempt by an offensive player to cut block (block at the thigh level or lower) a defensive player while the defender is already engaged by another offensive player. The chop block is usually considered illegal and penalized by a loss of 15-yards due to the injury risk it presents to the defender.

== NFL ==
Since the 2016 season In the National Football League (NFL), a chop block is an illegal move, penalized by a 15-yard loss. If the foul is committed by an offensive player in their own end zone, the penalty automatically results in a safety.

Before the 2016 NFL owners meeting, chop blocks were legal under certain circumstances. It was considered legal on running plays when (i) the blockers were aligned next to each other on the line of scrimmage, (ii) the blockers were lined up anywhere on the line and the flow of the play is towards the block or (iii) the cut blocker was aligned in the backfield and the chop block took place outside the original tight end position. The cut blocker is said to "chop" the defender and usually engages simultaneously with or immediately after the high block. A "reverse chop" occurs when the high block comes immediately after the low block and the same rules apply.

== NCAA ==
In the NCAA, chop blocks are penalized by a 15-yard loss.

Chop blocks were first banned in the NCAA in 1980.

== CFL ==
In the Canadian Football League (CFL), chop blocking is defined as cut blocking a player already engaged, physically or otherwise, with another blocker. It is always illegal and carries a 15-yard penalty.

== Injury risks ==
Although there were many variations and reforms made to the chop block technique, it was finally deemed illegal prior to the 2016–2017 season in the NFL, mainly due to the high probability of athlete injury. In its very nature, the chop block technique aims for the thigh area and lower, which leaves the player being chop blocked susceptible to knee and ankle injury. This kind of contact, towards the knee and ankle, can lead to injuries such as torn medial collateral ligaments (MCL) and anterior cruciate ligaments (ACL).
