= Sports in San Diego =

Location of San Diego in the United States

Sports in San Diego and its surrounding metropolitan area includes major professional league teams, other highest-level professional league teams, minor league teams, and college athletics. San Diego hosts two major professional league teams, the San Diego Padres of Major League Baseball (MLB) and San Diego FC of Major League Soccer (MLS). The city is home to three universities whose teams compete in the National Collegiate Athletic Association's (NCAA) Division I. The Sentry, a professional golf tournament on the PGA Tour, is played annually at Torrey Pines Golf Course.

Currently, there is no NBA, NFL, or NHL team in San Diego. The city hosted the National Football League's (NFL) San Diego Chargers from 1961 to 2017, when the team relocated to the Greater Los Angeles area (now the Los Angeles Chargers). San Diego also hosted the National Basketball Association's (NBA) San Diego Rockets from 1967 to 1971 (now the Houston Rockets) and San Diego Clippers from 1978 to 1984 (now the Los Angeles Clippers), and the now-defunct American Basketball Association's (ABA) San Diego Conquistadors/Sails from 1972 to 1975, prior to the 1976 ABA–NBA merger. The city has never hosted a National Hockey League (NHL) franchise, though it hosted the San Diego Mariners of the now-defunct World Hockey Association (WHA) from 1974 to 1977, prior to the 1979 NHL–WHA merger.

San Diego is the largest American city not to have won a championship in a major professional league. The city does have one major league title: the 1963 American Football League (AFL) Championship won by the San Diego Chargers, when the AFL was an independent entity prior to the AFL–NFL merger in 1970. Due to its lackluster record on winning professional championships, and in some cases retaining professional teams, some San Diego sports fans believe there is a curse on professional sports in the city.

== Professional teams ==
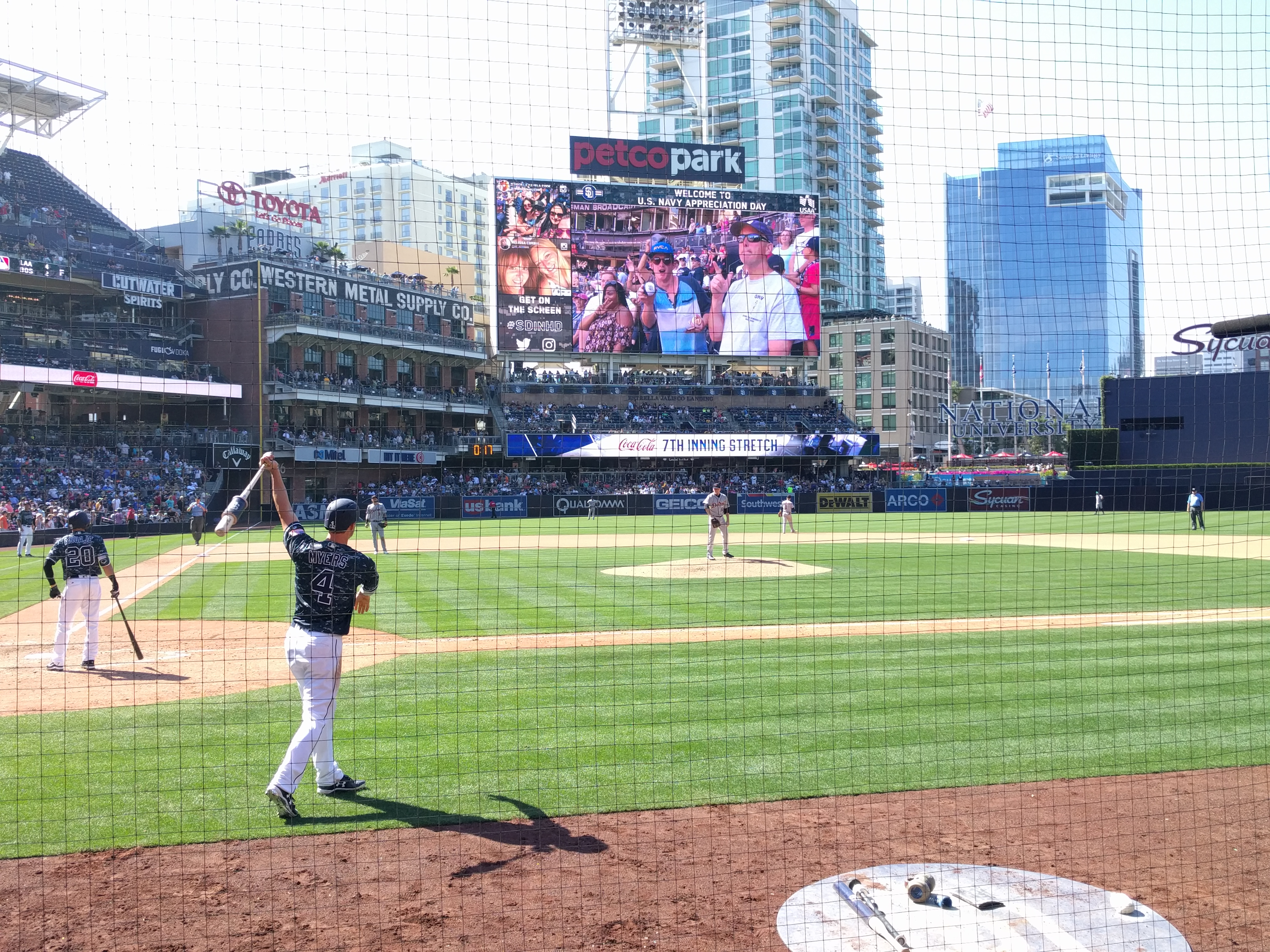
The San Diego Padres during a home game

=== Major professional league teams ===
The following teams compete in a major professional league.

Club	League	Sport	Home venue	Since (Note: First season in San Diego)	Attendance (Note: Average home game attendance)
San Diego Padres	MLB	Baseball	Petco Park	1936; (Note: Original founding as a Minor League Baseball (MiLB) team: San Diego Padres (PCL)) 1969	42,434 (2025)
San Diego FC	MLS	Soccer	Snapdragon Stadium	2025	28,064 (2025)

=== Other highest-level professional league teams ===
The following teams compete in a highest-level professional league.

Club	League	Sport	Home venue	Since (Note: First season in San Diego)	Attendance (Note: Average home game attendance)
San Diego Wave FC	NWSL	Soccer (women's)	Snapdragon Stadium	2022	19,575 (2024)
San Diego Seals	NLL	Box lacrosse	Frontwave Arena	2018	5,230 (2025)
San Diego Strike Force	IFL	Indoor football	Frontwave Arena	2019 (Note: Team was temporarily dormant for 2021 season due to effects of COVID-19 pandemic)	1,930 (2023)
San Diego Sockers	MASL	Indoor soccer	Frontwave Arena	1978; (Note: Original founding. Current team is the 3rd San Diego Sockers iteration of highest-level professional indoor soccer, revived in 2009. Previous teams: San Diego Sockers (1978–1996) and San Diego Sockers (2001–2004)) 2009	1,732 (2023–24)
Oceanside Stealth	AF1	Arena football	Frontwave Arena	2026	
California Redwoods	PLL	Field lacrosse	Torero Stadium	2024 (Note: Team began play in 2019 as Redwoods Lacrosse Club, a charter member of the PLL, which was a touring-only league of nomadic teams for its first five seasons. The league assigned teams to home markets beginning in 2024, with San Diego's Torero Stadium becoming the home of the Redwoods)	
California Palms	WLL	Lacrosse sixes (women's)	Torero Stadium	2025 (Note: The California Palms operate on a tour-based model and use Torero Stadium as their designated regional homecoming venue.)	
San Diego Growlers	UFA	Ultimate	Mission Bay High School	2015	
San Diego Super Bloom	WUL	Ultimate (women's)	Kearny High School	2022	
San Diego Rebellion	WNFC	Gridiron football (women's)	Escondido High School	2019	

=== Minor league teams ===
The following teams compete in a minor league.

Club	League	Sport	Home venue	Since (Note: First season in San Diego)	Attendance (Note: Average home game attendance)
San Diego Gulls	AHL	Ice hockey	Pechanga Arena	1966; (Note: Original founding. Current team is the 4th San Diego Gulls iteration of minor league professional ice hockey, revived in 2015. Previous teams: San Diego Gulls (1966–1974), San Diego Gulls (1990–1995) & San Diego Gulls (1995–2006)) 2015 (Note: Current AHL franchise was founded in 2000 as the Norfolk Admirals, later relocating to San Diego and assuming the Gulls name in 2015)	7,249 (2023–24)
San Diego Clippers	NBA G League	Basketball	Frontwave Arena	2024	
San Diego Surf Riders	MiLC	Cricket	Canyonside Park	2021	
Oceanside Shock	FPHL	Ice hockey	Frontwave Arena	2026	

== College athletics ==
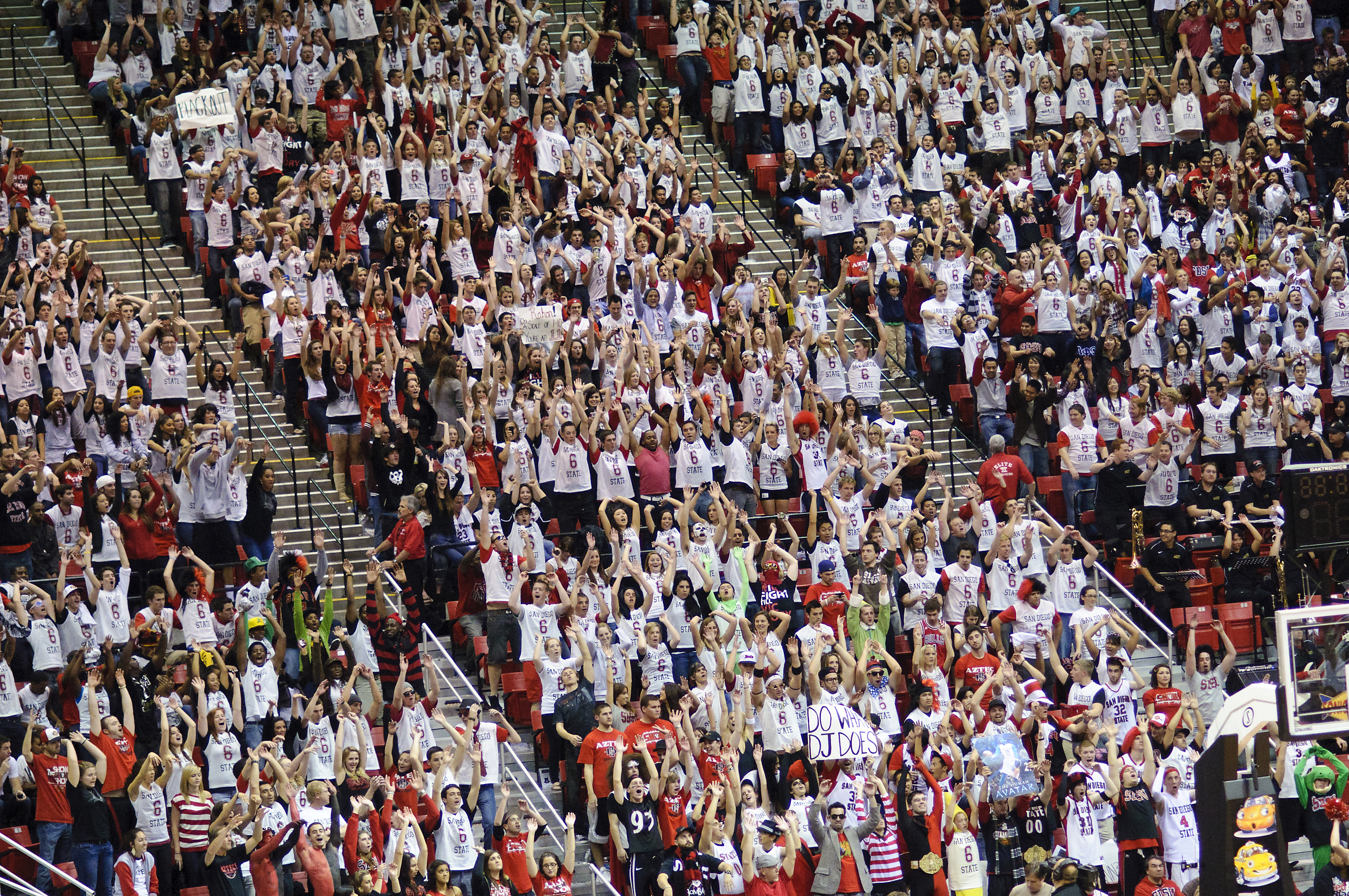
The Show at Viejas Arena during a San Diego State Aztecs men's basketball game

The following teams compete in the National Collegiate Athletic Association (NCAA).

Club	University	League	Primary conference	Enrollment
San Diego State Aztecs	San Diego State University	NCAA Division I (FBS)	Pac-12 Conference	35,723 (2022)
San Diego Toreros	University of San Diego	NCAA Division I (FCS)	West Coast Conference (football: Pioneer Football League)	8,815 (2022)
UC San Diego Tritons	University of California, San Diego	NCAA Division I	Big West Conference (West Coast Conference in July 2027)	42,968 (2022)
Cal State San Marcos Cougars	California State University, San Marcos	NCAA Division II	California Collegiate Athletic Association	14,311 (2022)
Point Loma Sea Lions	Point Loma Nazarene University	NCAA Division II	Pacific West Conference	3,179 (2021)

=== Teams sponsored by sport ===
==== NCAA Division I ====
Club	Baseball	Basketball		Cross country		Fencing		Football	Golf		Lacrosse		Rowing		Soccer		Softball	Swimming & diving		Tennis		Track & field		Volleyball		Water Polo	
	M	M	W	M	W	M	W	M	M	W	M	W	M	W	M	W	W	M	W	M	W	M	W	M	W	M	W
San Diego State Aztecs	✓	✓	✓		✓			✓ (FBS)	✓	✓		✓			✓	✓	✓		✓	✓	✓		✓		✓		✓
San Diego Toreros	✓	✓	✓	✓	✓			✓ (FCS)	✓				✓	✓	✓	✓	✓		✓	✓	✓		✓ (Note: San Diego Toreros women's track & field competes in outdoor competition only)		✓		
UC San Diego Tritons	✓	✓	✓	✓	✓	✓	✓		✓				✓	✓	✓	✓	✓	✓	✓	✓	✓	✓	✓	✓	✓	✓	✓

==== NCAA Division II ====
Club	Baseball	Basketball		Cross country		Golf		Soccer		Softball	Tennis		Track & field		Volleyball	
	M	M	W	M	W	M	W	M	W	W	M	W	M	W	M	W
Cal State San Marcos Cougars	✓	✓	✓	✓	✓	✓	✓	✓	✓	✓			✓	✓		✓
Point Loma Sea Lions	✓	✓	✓		✓		✓	✓	✓		✓	✓		✓		✓

== Events ==
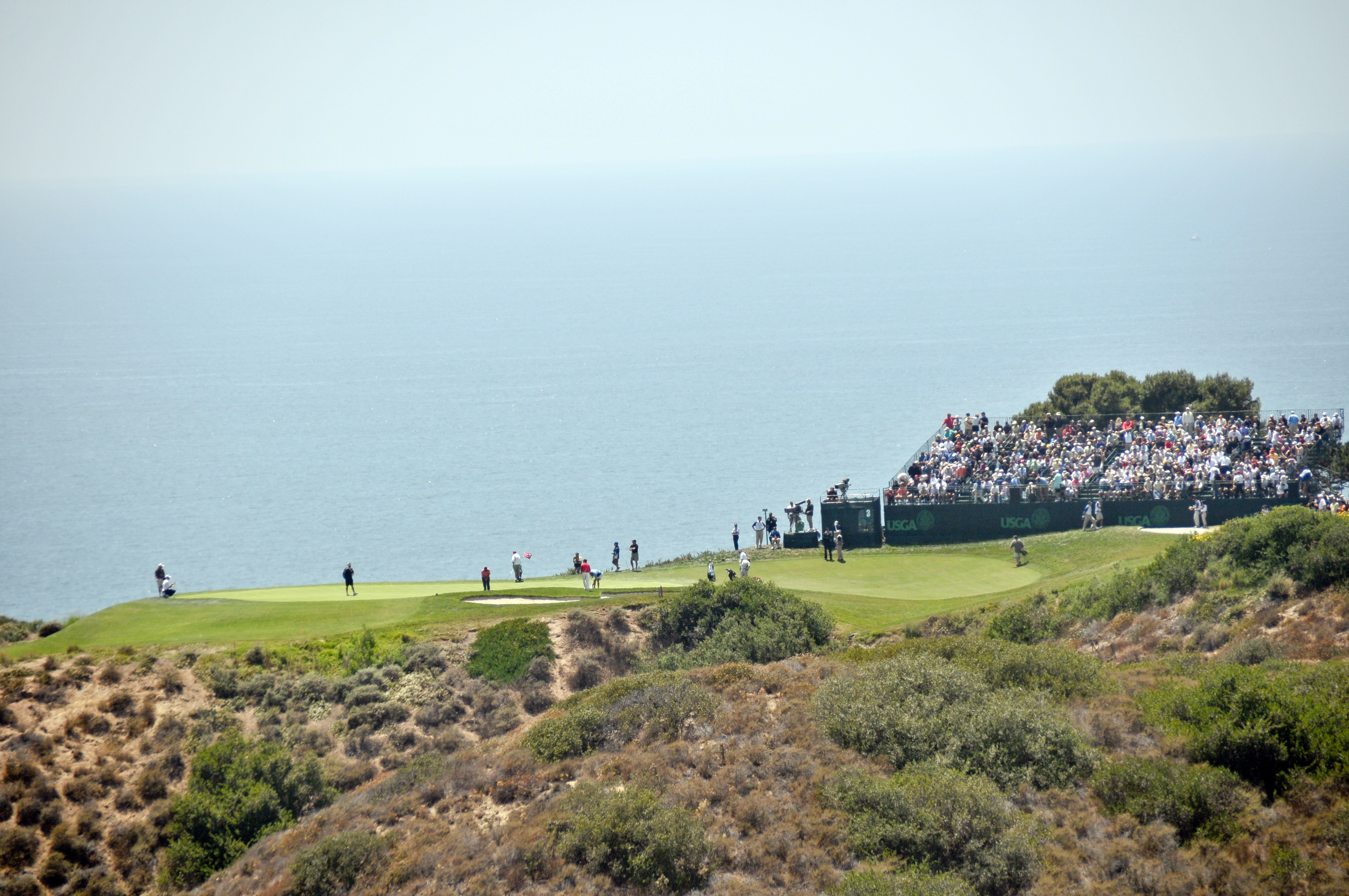
Hole 3 at Torrey Pines Golf Course during the 2008 U.S. Open

The following events occur annually in the San Diego metropolitan area.

Event	League	Sport	Venue	Since
The Sentry	PGA Tour	Golf	Torrey Pines Golf Course	1952
Holiday Bowl	NCAA Division I (FBS)	Football	Snapdragon Stadium	1978
Rady Children's Invitational	NCAA Division I	Basketball	Jenny Craig Pavilion	2023
San Diego Open	ATP Challenger Tour	Tennis	Barnes Tennis Center	1984
San Diego Bayfair Cup	H1 Unlimited	Hydroplane racing	Mission Bay	1964
Rock 'n' Roll San Diego Marathon	Rock 'n' Roll Running Series	Running	San Diego	1998

== Venues ==
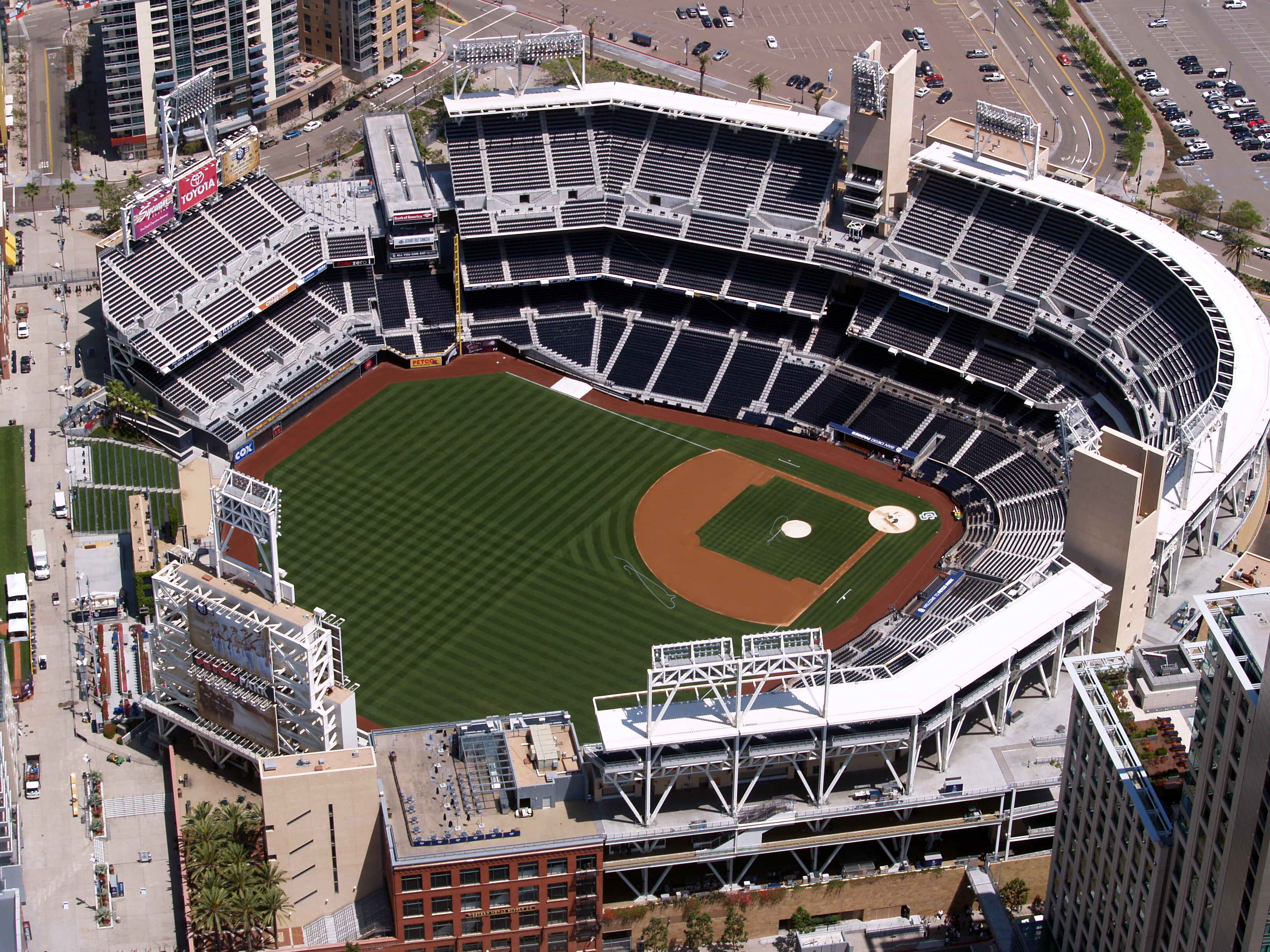
Petco Park in downtown San Diego

The following venues host professional and/or NCAA Division I teams and have a minimum capacity of 5000.

Venue	Capacity	League(s)	Current team(s)	Opened
Petco Park	39,860	MLB	San Diego Padres	2004
Snapdragon Stadium	35,000	NCAA Division I (FBS)	San Diego State Aztecs football	2022
Snapdragon Stadium	35,000	MLS	San Diego FC	2022
Snapdragon Stadium	35,000	NWSL	San Diego Wave FC	2022
Pechanga Arena	16,100 (Note: The arena's capacity is reduced to 12,920 for ice hockey and box lacrosse)	AHL	San Diego Gulls	1966
Viejas Arena	12,414	NCAA Division I	San Diego State Aztecs men's basketball, women's basketball	1997
Frontwave Arena	7,500	NBA G League	San Diego Clippers	2024
Frontwave Arena	7,500	MASL	San Diego Sockers	2024
Frontwave Arena	7,500	IFL	San Diego Strike Force	2024
Frontwave Arena	7,500	NLL	San Diego Seals	2024
Frontwave Arena	7,500	AF1	Oceanside Stealth	2024
Frontwave Arena	7,500	FPHL	Oceanside Shock	2024
Torero Stadium	6,000	NCAA Division I (FCS)	San Diego Toreros football, men's soccer, women's soccer	1961
Torero Stadium	6,000	PLL	California Redwoods	1961
Jenny Craig Pavilion	5,100	NCAA Division I	San Diego Toreros men's basketball, women's basketball, women's volleyball	2000
LionTree Arena	5,000	NCAA Division I	UC San Diego Tritons men's basketball, women's basketball, men's fencing, women's fencing, men's volleyball, women's volleyball	1995

== Sports ==
=== Baseball ===
The San Diego Padres of Major League Baseball (MLB) play at Petco Park, the team's home since it opened in 2004 in downtown San Diego's East Village. Prior to the opening of Petco Park in 2004, the Padres played their home games at San Diego Stadium in Mission Valley.

The Padres joined MLB in 1969 as an expansion team. The team originated as a Minor League Baseball (MiLB) team in the Pacific Coast League (PCL), where they played from 1936 through 1968 before joining Major League Baseball. As a PCL team, the Padres were based at Lane Field (now the site of the InterContinental Hotel San Diego) in downtown's Columbia neighborhood from 1936 through 1957, and Westgate Park in Mission Valley (now the site of Fashion Valley Mall) from 1958 through 1967. Their final season as a minor league team, 1968, was also their first at San Diego Stadium.

San Diego has hosted the MLB All-Star Game three times: 1978 and 1992 at San Diego Stadium, and 2016 at Petco Park. The 2016 edition was the final All-Star game to determine home field advantage in the World Series.

Petco Park has hosted the World Baseball Classic three times: 2006, the inaugural tournament (for which San Diego hosted the championship), 2009, and 2017.

Additionally popular are the local college baseball teams, particularly NCAA Division I's San Diego State Aztecs, San Diego Toreros, and UC San Diego Tritons. The Aztecs, Toreros, and Tritons play home games at their own on-campus venues, Tony Gwynn Stadium, Fowler Park, and Triton Ballpark, respectively.

MLB All-Star Games

Date	All-Star Game	Winner	Runs	Loser	Runs	Attendance	Venue	Host
July 11, 1978	1978 (49th)	National League (NL)	7	American League (AL)	3	51,549	San Diego Stadium	San Diego Padres
July 14, 1992	1992 (63rd)	American League (AL)	13	National League (NL)	6	59,372	Jack Murphy Stadium	San Diego Padres
July 12, 2016	2016 (87th)	American League (AL)	4	National League (NL)	2	42,386	Petco Park	San Diego Padres

=== Basketball ===
The most popular basketball team in San Diego currently is the San Diego State Aztecs of NCAA Division I, who play at their on-campus Viejas Arena. The San Diego Toreros and UC San Diego Tritons, also play within NCAA Division I. The Toreros and Tritons teams play home games at their own on-campus arenas, the Jenny Craig Pavilion and LionTree Arena, respectively.

San Diego has no current professional basketball representation, but the city has a significant history hosting professional basketball, nearly all encompassed within an 18-year period from 1967 to 1984.

The San Diego Rockets, a National Basketball Association (NBA) expansion team, played from 1967 to 1971. The franchise was founded and owned by local sports booster Robert Breitbard, who also founded and owned the original San Diego Gulls hockey franchise of the Western Hockey League and developed the San Diego Sports Arena (initially known as the San Diego International Sports Center), where the Rockets played. In 1971, the Rockets were sold and relocated to Houston after Breitbard encountered financial distress due to tax-assessment issues surrounding the sports arena, which ultimately prevented sale of the team to another local owner. The tax issues also led to Breitbard relinquishing control of the arena to Canadian millionaire Peter Graham, whose alleged mismanagement of the arena hampered future sports tenants. The franchise is now known as the Houston Rockets.

The 1971 NBA All-Star Game was held at the San Diego Sports Arena, hosted by the Rockets just months prior to the team's sale and relocation.

During the 1971–72 NBA season, San Diego was the part-time home of the Golden State Warriors for six home games (one each month of the season). The Warriors notably changed their name from "San Francisco" to "Golden State" prior to the season as the team was searching for a new home arena and looked to make a play for the San Diego market (as well as Oakland) following the departure of the Rockets to Houston. The team ultimately stayed in the San Francisco Bay Area, settling full time in Oakland at Oakland Arena the following season.

From 1972 to 1975, San Diego was home to the San Diego Conquistadors of the American Basketball Association (ABA), the league's first (and ultimately only) expansion team. Known as the Conquistadors (a.k.a. "The Q's") for its first three seasons, the team name was changed to the San Diego Sails following a change in ownership for the 1975–76 season. The franchise was folded 11 games into that season after ownership learned that the team was to be shut out of the upcoming ABA–NBA merger, reportedly at the insistence of then-Los Angeles Lakers owner Jack Kent Cooke. Cooke was upset that the San Diego franchise had signed former Lakers star Wilt Chamberlain away from his franchise two years prior (Lakers ownership successfully sued Chamberlain over the contract, ultimately preventing Chamberlain from playing with the Conquistadors, relegating him to coaching duties) and also expressed unwillingness of allowing another team in Southern California. The Conquistadors/Sails played at Peterson Gymnasium for the 1972–73 season and Golden Hall for the 1973–74 season before ownership was permitted to base the team at the San Diego Sports Arena, where it played the remainder of its games.

Professional basketball returned from 1978 to 1984, in the form of the NBA's San Diego Clippers, the relocated successor to the Buffalo Braves franchise. The team was based at the San Diego Sports Arena. In 1981, the Clippers were bought by Los Angeles-area real estate developer Donald Sterling. Sterling attempted to move the team the following year in 1982 to his home of Los Angeles, but his request was denied by the NBA, which investigated Sterling's alleged widespread mismanagement of the franchise the same year. The investigation report recommended the termination of Sterling's ownership of the Clippers on the basis that he had failed to pay creditors and players on time. Days before a scheduled vote to terminate his ownership, he announced he would sell the team, prompting the league to cancel the scheduled vote. Sterling ultimately remained owner, satisfying league officials by instead relinquishing operational duties of the franchise. In 1984, Sterling again applied to relocate the team to Los Angeles, and despite again being denied permission to do so from the NBA, moved the team to Los Angeles Memorial Sports Arena. Lawsuits followed, but Sterling ultimately prevailed and was able to keep the team in Los Angeles, also in part due to his close personal friendship with then-Lakers owner Jerry Buss, who welcomed sharing the Los Angeles market with Sterling's franchise. The franchise is now known as the Los Angeles Clippers. San Diego has not hosted major professional basketball since.

On March 11, 2024, it was announced that the NBA G League minor league affiliate of the Los Angeles Clippers, the Ontario Clippers, would be relocating to the San Diego area city of Oceanside's newly constructed Frontwave Arena ahead of the 2024–25 season and rebranding as the San Diego Clippers, using its NBA affiliate's former identity from 1978 to 1984.

NBA All-Star Game

Date	All-Star Game	Winner	Points	Loser	Points	Attendance	Venue	Host
January 12, 1971	1971 (21st)	Western Conference	108	Eastern Conference	107	14,378	San Diego Sports Arena	San Diego Rockets

=== Football ===
The most popular American football team in San Diego currently is the San Diego State Aztecs football team of NCAA Division I (FBS). The Aztecs moved into their new Snapdragon Stadium upon its completion in August 2022. The San Diego Toreros football team of NCAA Division I FCS also has a local following. The Toreros are based at their on-campus stadium, Torero Stadium.

San Diego is also home to the San Diego Strike Force of the Indoor Football League (IFL), the highest level of professional Indoor American football. The Strike Force began play in 2019.

The city does not currently host a National Football League (NFL) team, though it previously hosted the San Diego Chargers, who were based in San Diego from 1961 through the 2016 season. The Chargers began play in 1960 as a charter member of the American Football League (AFL), and spent its first season in Los Angeles where it struggled to garner a following before moving to San Diego in 1961. The Chargers joined the NFL as result of the AFL–NFL merger in 1970, and played their home games initially at Balboa Stadium, then at San Diego Stadium from 1967 until relocating to Los Angeles in 2017. The team moved to Los Angeles following a request by owner Dean Spanos to relocate the team to SoFi Stadium, a new stadium constructed by Los Angeles Rams owner Stan Kroenke, where the Chargers would be a tenant and share the new stadium with the Rams. They are now known as the Los Angeles Chargers. The Chargers' relocation left San Diego without a professional football team for the first time since 1961.

San Diego hosted the Super Bowl three times at San Diego Stadium during the Chargers' tenure in the city. The city does have one major league title to its name: the 1963 American Football League (AFL) Championship won by the former San Diego Chargers, when the AFL was an independent entity prior to the AFL–NFL merger in 1970.

On May 29, 2018, the Alliance of American Football (AAF) announced they would start a franchise in San Diego, the San Diego Fleet. The team played their home games at SDCCU Stadium, while San Diego native and former St. Louis Rams head coach Mike Martz was the head coach. The league suspended operations before it could complete its inaugural season.

Super Bowls (NFL)

Date	Super Bowl	NFC Champion	Points	AFC Champion	Points	Attendance	Venue	Host
January 31, 1988	XXII	Washington Redskins	42	Denver Broncos	10	73,302	Jack Murphy Stadium	San Diego Chargers
January 25, 1998	XXXII	Green Bay Packers	24	Denver Broncos	31	68,912	Qualcomm Stadium	San Diego Chargers
January 26, 2003	XXXVII	Tampa Bay Buccaneers	48	Oakland Raiders	21	67,603	Qualcomm Stadium	San Diego Chargers

=== Ice hockey ===
San Diego has never hosted a National Hockey League (NHL) team, though the city is represented by the San Diego Gulls of the American Hockey League, the highest level of minor league ice hockey. The current version of the Gulls, which began play in 2015 after relocating from Norfolk, Virginia, plays at Pechanga Arena and following a long lineage of professional ice hockey teams which have used the San Diego Gulls name. The original San Diego Gulls, which played from 1966 until 1974, were the first tenants at the San Diego Sports Arena.

San Diego's history of minor league ice hockey teams began with the San Diego Skyhawks of the Pacific Coast Hockey League, who played from 1948 to 1950, hosting home games at Glacier Gardens. A second iteration of the Skyhawks played in the California Hockey League (1957–1963) from 1960 to 1962, also at Glacier Gardens. Hockey returned in 1966 with the original San Diego Gulls of the Western Hockey League, which were created by Robert Breitbard to have a tenant for his upcoming arena, the San Diego Sports Arena. The Gulls soon grew a fanbase in San Diego, with averages of over 9,000 spectators. By 1971, the year Breitbard's National Basketball Association franchise relocated to Texas to become the Houston Rockets, the Gulls had attendances larger than both the Rockets and the Californian National Hockey League (NHL) teams, the Los Angeles Kings and Oakland Seals.

The Gulls ceased operations in 1974 to give way for the relocated San Diego Mariners of the upstart World Hockey Association (WHA), which at the time was the NHL's rival league. The Mariners relocated to San Diego after spending their first two seasons of operation in New York City and New Jersey. The WHA's financial instability caused the Mariners to fold upon the failed NHL-WHA merger of 1977. Two years later, the successful NHL-WHA merger of 1979 occurred, with four WHA franchises being accepted into the NHL. The Mariners were one of several teams to fold in 1977 after the NHL indicated it planned to only take four teams instead of six in absorbing the WHA.

Another Mariners team was one of the charter teams of the short-lived Pacific Hockey League that began play the same year the previous Mariners team folded, being renamed Hawks in the following and last PHL season. The arena remained without hockey until 1990, when another San Diego Gulls team was founded in the International Hockey League (1990–95). After the IHL team moved to Los Angeles, another Gulls team played for over a decade in both the West Coast Hockey League (1995–03) and ECHL (2003–06). The current San Diego Gulls, of the American Hockey League, started playing in 2015, and are the top minor league affiliate of the NHL's Anaheim Ducks.

San Diego was involved when the NHL expanded in the early 1990s from 22 teams to 26. Following the December 1989 announcement by the NHL of its intent to expand the league, 11 bids from 10 cities (two from San Diego) were submitted for an NHL expansion franchise. The two separate bids for a San Diego franchise included one by local entrepreneurs Harry Cooper and Richard Esquinas (lease-holders of the San Diego Sports Arena), and one by Los Angeles Lakers owner Jerry Buss. Neither bid advanced with any serious traction. Cooper and Esquinas's bid relied on a future new arena that their group would plan to build, but only if they were awarded an expansion team first. Buss's bid meanwhile quickly shifted focus to Anaheim instead. Cooper and Esquinas's bid ultimately gave way to a new proposal by local developer Ron Hahn, who made a similar commitment to build a new arena, but only if an NHL or NBA franchise was secured first. In 1993, the NHL awarded a team to the Walt Disney Company in Anaheim, to be known as the Mighty Ducks of Anaheim (now Anaheim Ducks). In contrast to the efforts in San Diego, Anaheim chose to build a new arena without commitments from any franchise, and were subsequently awarded a team.

At the college level, there are currently ice hockey teams at the club level of each of the major universities and in the area, though NCAA ice hockey has no presence west of Colorado (excluding Alaska) with Arizona State Sun Devils men's ice hockey, which began play in 2015 and competes as an NCAA Division I independent, being the only exception.

San Diego has previously hosted an NCAA Division I ice hockey program, the United States International Gulls men's ice hockey team of United States International University (USIU), which competed for nine years from 1979 until 1988. The USIU Gulls had some success on the ice and were notable for producing two future NHL players and being the only NCAA hockey team west of the Rockies when founded. The team co-founded the short-lived Great West Hockey Conference (GWHC) with Alaska–Anchorage, Alaska–Fairbanks and Northern Arizona in 1985. USIU folded its hockey team and subsequently the entire varsity sports program due to financial strain and ultimate bankruptcy. In 2001, the university underwent a merger with the California School of Professional Psychology and reorganization, to form Alliant International University. Alliant had a small sports program for a few years before intercollegiate sports were phased out entirely in 2007.

On September 29, 2023, San Diego hosted an exhibition matchup at Pechanga Arena between the Anaheim Ducks and Los Angeles Kings, the first NHL hockey game played in San Diego since a previous exhibition game in 1994. The Kings won the game 4–3 in front of 11,044 fans.

=== Soccer ===
San Diego FC is a Major League Soccer (MLS) team that began play in 2025. San Diego is also currently represented in the lower divisions of the United States soccer league system by Albion San Diego SC of the National Independent Soccer Association (one of three leagues occupying the second-highest level of minor league soccer). Despite not hosting an MLS team at the time, San Diego did host the 1999 MLS All-Star Game at Qualcomm Stadium.

In 2022, the city became the home to San Diego Wave FC, a new expansion team of the National Women's Soccer League (NWSL), slated to play its home games at Torero Stadium before moving to its permanent home of Snapdragon Stadium upon the venue's completion in September 2022. Wave FC's first home game at Snapdragon Stadium, against regional rival and fellow 2022 NWSL entry Angel City FC, drew a league-record sellout crowd of 32,000.

On May 18, 2023, MLS announced that it would expand to San Diego, adding the city as the league's 30th team. The team, named San Diego FC, is set to begin play in 2025 at Snapdragon Stadium with an ownership group headlined by Egyptian businessman Mohamed Mansour and the Sycuan Band of the Kumeyaay Nation.

The city also hosts the San Diego Sockers of the Major Arena Soccer League (MASL), the highest level of professional indoor soccer. The current version of the Sockers follows a lineage of other professional soccer teams which have used the San Diego Sockers name.

The original North American Soccer League (NASL) included a San Diego franchise known as the original San Diego Sockers. The original Sockers indoor franchise also played in the NASL indoor league, Major Indoor Soccer League, Continental Indoor Soccer League, World Indoor Soccer League and second Major Indoor Soccer League.

At the collegiate level, the city boasts both men's and women's varsity teams at each of the three NCAA Division I schools in the city. The San Diego State Aztecs men's and women's soccer teams play at the on-campus SDSU Sports Deck, the San Diego Toreros men's and women's teams play at Torero Stadium, and the UC San Diego Tritons men's and women's teams play at Triton Soccer Stadium.

With the expansion of the minor professional league National Premier Soccer League, the San Diego Flash saw the addition of the North County Battalion and Albion SC Pros. The San Diego SeaLions play in the Women's Premier Soccer League, and the San Diego Zest play in the USL Premier Development League with the SoCal Surf. San Diego Internacional FC began playing in the UPSL in 2019.

On June 25, 2017, it was announced that San Diego 1904 FC would join the North American Soccer League in 2018. The club's founders include professional soccer players Demba Ba, Eden Hazard, Yohan Cabaye and Moussa Sow. In 2021 the club was purchased and became Albion San Diego SC.

On June 19, 2019, it was announced that Landon Donovan would be bringing a new USL Championship team to San Diego. The club, San Diego Loyal SC, began play during the 2020 USL Championship season. However, the team folded in October 2023.

During the 2028 Summer Olympics, a total of eleven Olympic soccer matches will be played at Snapdragon Stadium.

=== Golf ===
The Sentry (originally the San Diego Open, later the Buick Invitational and Farmers Insurance Open) an annual golf tournament on the PGA Tour occurs at Torrey Pines Golf Course, which has hosted the tournament since 1968. The event was founded in 1952 at San Diego Country Club in Chula Vista. The tournament was founded in 1952 and was played at a variety of venues in the San Diego area in its early years, beginning with San Diego Country Club in Chula Vista for its first two years. The tournament was also played in Rancho Santa Fe and El Cajon, as well as locally in Mission Valley and Rancho Bernardo during these years. The course was the site of the 2008 and 2021 U.S. Open.

The LPGA Tour's JTBC Classic is held annually at the Aviara Golf Club in nearby Carlsbad, which has hosted the event since 2012 after the event's relocation from Los Angeles County.

At the college level, the city is home to the NCAA Division I San Diego State Aztecs men's and women's golf teams, San Diego Toreros men's golf team, and the UC San Diego Tritons men's and women's teams.

The San Diego region is home to 72 golf courses in total.

=== Motorsports ===
In 2012, a street course was created on Naval Air Station North Island on Naval Base Coronado in southern San Diego, the circuit hosted Global MX-5 Cup races in 2012 and 2013, and Stadium Super Trucks in 2014. The circuit was then left dormant, being used as part of the rest of the base.

On July 23, 2025, it was officially announced that the NASCAR Cup Series, O'Reilly Auto Parts Series, and Craftsman Truck Series would race there starting in 2026. This will be NASCAR's first race in southern California since 2024, after the LA Coliseum was dropped in favor of Bowman Gray Stadium and Auto Club Speedway was demolished.

=== Lacrosse ===
On August 30, 2017, the National Lacrosse League (NLL), the world's top box lacrosse league, awarded an expansion franchise to the city of San Diego and owner Joseph Tsai. On October 24, the NLL and San Diego owners unveiled the San Diego Seals identity. Also revealed were the colors, purple, gold, gray, and black, and the team logo. The team began play in December 2018 at Pechanga Arena and earned the second overall playoff seed in the West Division after a successful 10–8 regular season. Home game attendance during the inaugural season averaged 7,769 fans per contest. On August 21st 2026, the Seals relocated from Pechanga Arena to Frontwave Arena

In 2024, the Premier Lacrosse League (PLL), the highest level professional field lacrosse league, transitioned to having teams based in home markets after playing its first five seasons with all nomadic teams in a touring-only model. The California Redwoods, a charter member of the league which played its first five seasons known as Redwoods Lacrosse Club, were announced to be making San Diego their home in 2024.

San Diego hosted the 2023 World Lacrosse Championship. The newly constructed Snapdragon Stadium was the event's primary venue, with Torero Stadium and other fields at both San Diego State University and the University of San Diego also used for tournament play.

The city is also currently home to the NCAA Division I San Diego State Aztecs women's lacrosse team.

=== Rugby league ===
The San Diego Barracudas are a member of the USA Rugby League's Pacific Coast Rugby League.

=== Rugby union ===
The San Diego Legion of Major League Rugby (MLR), the highest level of rugby in the United States, were based in the city at Snapdragon Stadium. The team moved for the 2023 season after previously playing at both Torero Stadium and the SDSU Sports Deck. The Legion began play in 2018 as one of the league's seven founding franchises. In 2025, the Legion was merged with Rugby FC Los Angeles to become the California Legion.

In women's rugby, the San Diego Surfers have competed in the 10-team Women's Premier League (WPL), the highest level of domestic women's rugby union, since 2011. Initially founded in 1975 as an amateur team, the club has won the WPL national title twice, in 2016 and 2018, in addition to four national championships in USA Rugby Club 7s.

An array of clubs, ranging from men's and women's clubs to collegiate and high school clubs, are part of the Southern California Rugby Football Union. The United States national rugby sevens team train at the United States Olympic Training Center in Chula Vista, San Diego. Additionally, the USA Sevens, an event in the annual World Rugby Sevens Series for international teams in rugby sevens, was held in Petco Park from 2007 through 2009 before moving to Las Vegas for 2010 and back to Los Angeles more recently.

The San Diego Breakers, who played in the only season of PRO Rugby (2016) before the league folded, likewise played at Torero Stadium. The USA Sevens, a major international rugby event, was also held at the same stadium from 2007 through 2009. San Diego is also represented by Old Mission Beach Athletic Club RFC, the former home club of USA Rugby's former Captain Todd Clever.

=== Sailing ===
San Diego Yacht Club is a yacht club located in San Diego Bay. The club is one of the oldest in the United States, founded in 1886. It is located in Point Loma across from a spit of land known as Shelter Island. San Diego Yacht Club won the America's Cup in 1987, 1988, and 1992, hosting the event in 1988, 1992, and 1995. The club boasts one of the largest and oldest junior sailing programs in the country.

=== Tennis ===
The San Diego Open is a WTA 500 tournament held at the Barnes Tennis Centre. In August 2021, after the cancellation of the Asia Swing due to the COVID-19 pandemic, the Barnes Tennis Centre San Diego was allocated a two-year ATP 250 tournament license.

The San Diego Aviators of World TeamTennis (WTT) moved to San Diego from New York City prior to the start of the 2014 season. They were founded in 1995 and formerly known as the New York Sportimes. The Aviators played their 2014 home matches at the indoor Valley View Casino Center. In 2015, they moved to Omni La Costa Resort and Spa in Carlsbad. In their first three seasons in San Diego, they finished with the league's top regular-season record twice (2014 and 2016), and won the King Trophy as 2016 WTT champions. The WTT went on hiatus after cancelling the 2022 season.

San Diego has had two previous WTT franchises. The San Diego Friars were a WTT expansion franchise that began play in 1975. They used the San Diego Sports Arena (now Pechanga Arena) as their primary home venue but played some home matches at the Anaheim Convention Center between 1975 and 1977, before Anaheim got its own team in 1978. After missing the playoffs their first two seasons, the Friars qualified in 1977 and 1978, and were the 1978 Western Division champions, but lost in the quarterfinals. The team folded after the 1978 season. International Tennis Hall of Famers Rod Laver and Dennis Ralston played for the Friars.

In 1981, the Friars returned as an expansion franchise as WTT resumed operations rebranded as TeamTennis after a hiatus. After three seasons as the Friars, the team was renamed the San Diego Buds before the 1984 season. The Buds won both the 1984 and 1985 TeamTennis championships but folded following the 1985 season. Hall of Famer Rosie Casals was the Friars player-coach in 1983.

At the collegiate level, San Diego State University, University of San Diego, and UC San Diego each support both men's and women's NCAA Division I tennis teams.

=== Volleyball ===
The Pro Volleyball Federation (PVF), the highest level of women's professional volleyball, announced a San Diego team in 2023 (ultimately named the San Diego Mojo) as one of the league's charter members, began play within the league's first season in 2024. USA Volleyball star Kerri Walsh Jennings was announced as the new team's lead owner. In June 2023, former olympian Tayyiba Haneef-Park was named the team's first head coach.

In 2022, San Diego received an expansion team in the National Volleyball Association (NVA), the highest level of men's professional volleyball, which would begin play in the 2023 NVA season. The team, which became known as the San Diego Wild, reached the 2023 NVA Championship Cup Finals in its first season, ultimately finishing runner-up after falling to the Orange County Stunners 3–0 on July 30, 2023.

=== Ultimate ===
San Diego is represented at the highest professional level of men's ultimate in the Ultimate Frisbee Association (UFA) by the San Diego Growlers. The team began play in 2015. The UFA (formerly the AUDL) officially announced the Growlers as an expansion team in October 2014.

A women's highest-level team in the Western Ultimate League (WUL), the San Diego Super Bloom, was launched in 2020 as one of the league's founding franchises, formerly known as the San Diego Wolfpack. The team competes as a member of the Southwest Division of the league.

=== Cricket ===
The San Diego Surf Riders are a professional Twenty20 cricket team that competes in Minor League Cricket (MiLC). The Surf Riders began play in the league's 2021 season. The team's home ground is Canyonside Park, located in the community of Rancho Peñasquitos.

=== Ulama ===
The Atlético Tlecoyotes de San Diego compete in the Mesoamerican Ballgame Association USA, also known as AJUPEME USA, the main sports organization for Ulama in the United States. The team became one of the first in the league in 2023. The region is becoming a center for the revival of the Mesoamerican ball game as the team hosts Ulama events across the county. AJUPEME USA plays Ulama de Cadera, or hip ulama, meaning it plays the iteration of Ulama with hips.

== Former teams ==
=== Former major league teams ===
Club	Sport	Duration		League	Venue(s)	Titles	Fate
Club	Sport	Start	End	League	Venue(s)	Titles	Fate
San Diego Chargers	Football	1961	2016	National Football League (NFL): 1970–2016 American Football League (AFL): 1961–1969	San Diego Stadium, Balboa Stadium	AFL: 1 (1963)	Owner Dean Spanos relocated franchise to the Los Angeles suburb of Inglewood to be a tenant in the newly constructed SoFi Stadium.
San Diego Clippers	Basketball	October 13, 1978	April 14, 1984	National Basketball Association (NBA)	San Diego Sports Arena		Owner Donald Sterling relocated franchise to Los Angeles, successfully utilizing lawsuits to do so, after twice being denied official permission from the NBA (in both 1982 & 1984) to move.
San Diego Mariners	Ice hockey	1974	1977	World Hockey Association (WHA)	San Diego Sports Arena		Franchise folded upon failed 1977 NHL-WHA merger (2 years prior to 1979 NHL-WHA merger)
San Diego Conquistadors / Sails	Basketball	October 13, 1972	November 12, 1975	American Basketball Association (ABA)	San Diego Sports Arena; Golden Hall; Peterson Gymnasium		Franchise folded after ownership learned it was to be excluded from the upcoming ABA–NBA merger (occurred 6 months later), reportedly at the insistence of Los Angeles Lakers then-ownership.
Golden State Warriors	Basketball	October 29, 1971	March 3, 1972	National Basketball Association (NBA)	San Diego Sports Arena (part-time venue with Oakland-Alameda County Coliseum Arena)		The Warriors played six "home" games in San Diego during the 1971–72 season as part of an effort to represent all of California. Poor attendance led them to return full-time to Oakland the following season.
San Diego Rockets	Basketball	October 14, 1967	March 21, 1971	National Basketball Association (NBA)	San Diego Sports Arena		Owner encountered financial turmoil, franchise sale and relocation to Houston, Texas resulted.
San Diego Toros	Soccer	1968	1968	North American Soccer League (NASL)	Balboa Stadium		Franchise folded after reaching the NASL Final 1968
San Diego Jaws	Soccer	1976	1976	North American Soccer League (NASL)	Aztec Bowl		Relocated to Las Vegas, becoming Las Vegas Quicksilvers for 1 season before relocating back to San Diego in 1978 as San Diego Sockers.
San Diego Sockers	Soccer	1978	1984	North American Soccer League (NASL)	San Diego Stadium		Became indoor-only team after NASL folded March 28, 1985

=== Former professional teams ===
Club	Sport	Duration		League	Venue(s)	Titles	Fate
Club	Sport	Start	End	League	Venue(s)	Titles	Fate
Albion San Diego	Soccer	1981; (Note: Original founding as Albion SC youth academy) 2019; (Note: San Diego 1904 FC competed in the NISA from 2019 to 2021 before being absorbed into Albion San Diego in December 2021) 2022 (Note: First season as Albion San Diego following merger absorbing San Diego 1904 FC)	2023	National Independent Soccer Association (NISA)	Canyon Crest Academy		Inactive as of 2024 season
San Diego Loyal SC	Soccer	2019	2023	USL Championship (USLC)	Torero Stadium		Folded
San Diego Surfers	Rugby (women's)	1975; (Note: Original founding as an amateur club) 2011	2022	Women's Premier League (WPL)	Robb Field	2 (Note: 2016, 2018 In addition to WPL championships, the team was won several club championships: D1: 3 (2009, 2010, 2023) USA Rugby Club 7s: 4 (2012, 2014, 2018, 2019))	Withdrew from WPL, still competes in club competition
San Diego Aviators	Team tennis	2014 (Note: Franchise was founded in 1995 in New York City, relocated to San Diego in 2014)	2021	World TeamTennis (WTT) (Note: League has been on hiatus since 2022)		1	League folded
San Diego 1904 FC	Soccer	2019	2021	National Independent Soccer Association (NISA)	Chula Vista Elite Athlete Training Center		Merged into Albion San Diego
San Diego Fleet	Football	2019	2019	Alliance of American Football (AAF)	San Diego Stadium		League folded
San Diego Surge	Football (women's)	2010	2019	Women's Football Alliance (WFA)	Santana High School	1 (2012)	Folded
San Diego Breakers	Rugby	2016	2017	PRO Rugby	Torero Stadium		League folded
San Diego Sting	Football (women's)	2010	2016	Women's Football Alliance (WFA)	Carlsbad High School		
San Diego Flash	Soccer	1998	2016	National Premier Soccer League (NPSL)	Mira Mesa High School Stadium		Folded
So Cal Scorpions	Football (women's)	2003	2011	Women's Football Alliance (WFA)	Balboa Stadium		Folded
San Diego Shockwave	Indoor football	2007	2008	National Indoor Football League (NIFL)	Cox Arena	1 (2007)	League folded
San Diego Pumitas	Soccer	1999	2007	National Premier Soccer League (NPSL)	Balboa Stadium		
San Diego Gauchos	Soccer	2002	2007	Premier Development League (PDL)	Torero Stadium		Folded
San Diego Sunwaves	Soccer (women's)	2005	2007	USL W-League	Torero Stadium		Folded
San Diego Gulls	Ice hockey	1995 (Note: 3nd San Diego Gulls iteration, founded the same year previous team relocated (San Diego Gulls (1990–1995)))	2006 (Note: 4th and current San Diego Gulls iteration was later founded in 2015 (San Diego Gulls))	West Coast Hockey League (WCHL)/East Coast Hockey League (ECHL)	San Diego Sports Arena	5	Folded. Revived 2015
San Diego Siege	Basketball (women's)	2006	2006	National Women's Basketball League (NWBL)	Harry West Gymnasium		League folded
San Diego Riptide	Indoor football	2002	2005	AF2	San Diego Sports Arena		Folded
San Diego Sockers	Indoor soccer	2001 (Note: 2nd San Diego Sockers iteration. Original founded in 1978)	2004	Major Indoor Soccer League (MISL)	San Diego Sports Arena		Folded. Revived 2009
San Diego Spirit	Soccer (women's)	2001	2003	Women's United Soccer Association (WUSA)	Torero Stadium		League folded
San Diego Top Guns	Soccer	1994	1996	United Soccer League (USL)	Merrill Douglas Stadium, San Diego Mesa College		Folded
San Diego Barracudas	Inline hockey	1993	1996	Roller Hockey International (RHI)	San Diego Sports Arena		Relocated to Ontario, California, became the Ontario Barracudas.
San Diego Gulls	Ice hockey	1990 (Note: 2nd San Diego Gulls iteration. Original team played from 1966 to 1974 (San Diego Gulls (1966–1974)))	1995 (Note: 3nd San Diego Gulls iteration was founded later in 1995 (San Diego Gulls (1995–2006)))	International Hockey League (IHL)	San Diego Sports Arena		Relocated to Los Angeles, became Los Angeles Ice Dogs. Revived later in 1995
San Diego Nomads	Soccer	1986	1990	Western Soccer Alliance (WSA)		1 (1987)	Withdrew, became amateur team
San Diego Buds / Friars	Team tennis	1981	1985	World TeamTennis (WTT)		2 (1984, 1985)	Folded
San Diego Sockers	Indoor soccer	1980	1996	NASL, Continental Indoor Soccer League (CISL)	San Diego Sports Arena	10	Folded. Revived 2001
San Diego Hawks / Mariners	Ice hockey	1977	1979	Pacific Hockey League (PHL)	San Diego Sports Arena		League folded
San Diego Friars	Team tennis	1975	1978	World TeamTennis (WTT)			Folded
San Diego Breakers	Volleyball (co-ed)	1975	1978	International Volleyball Association (IVA)		1 (1976)	
San Diego Gulls	Ice hockey	1966	1974	Western Hockey League (WHL)	San Diego Sports Arena		Folded upon the arrival of WHA's Jersey Knights (became San Diego Mariners). Revived 1990
San Diego Skyhawks	Ice hockey	1960 (Note: 2nd San Diego Skyhawks iteration)	1962	California Hockey League (CHL)			Folded
San Diego Skyhawks	Ice hockey	1941	1950	Pacific Coast Hockey League (PCHL)	Glacier Gardens	1 (1949)	Folded
San Diego Bombers	Football	1940	1946	Pacific Coast Professional Football League (PCPHL)	Balboa Stadium		
San Diego Legion	Rugby	2018	2025	Major League Rugby (MLR)	Torero Stadium		Merged into California Legion
San Diego Mojo	Volleyball	2023	2026	Major League Volleyball (MLV)	Viejas Arena		Folded

=== Former college teams ===
Club	University	League	Primary conference
Saint Katherine Firebirds	University of Saint Katherine	NAIA (2010–2024)	California Pacific Conference
San Diego Christian Hawks	San Diego Christian College	NAIA (1999–2023)	Golden State Athletic Conference
United States International Gulls	United States International University	NCAA Division I (1979–88)	Independent

== Former events ==
Year	Event	League	Sport	Venue
1968	NASL Final 1968 first leg	NASL	Soccer	Balboa Stadium
1971	1971 NBA All-Star Game (21st)	NBA	Basketball	San Diego Sports Arena
1973	Muhammad Ali vs. Ken Norton heavyweight title first match	NABF	Boxing	San Diego Sports Arena
1975	1975 NCAA Division I men's basketball tournament Final Four	NCAA D-I	Basketball	San Diego Sports Arena
1978	1978 MLB All-Star Game (49th)	MLB	Baseball	San Diego Stadium
1982	Soccer Bowl '82	NASL	Soccer	Jack Murphy Stadium
1984	1984 Summer Olympics - Equestrian events	Olympic Games	Equestrian	Fairbanks Ranch Country Club
1984	1984 World Series (81st) games 1 & 2	MLB	Baseball	Jack Murphy Stadium
1988	Super Bowl XXII	NFL	Football	Jack Murphy Stadium
1988	1988 America's Cup (27th)	America's Cup	Sailing	San Diego
1992	1992 America's Cup (28th)	America's Cup	Sailing	San Diego
1992	1992 MLB All-Star Game (63rd)	MLB	Baseball	Jack Murphy Stadium
1995	1995 America's Cup (29th)	America's Cup	Sailing	San Diego
1997	Summer X Games III	X Games	Extreme	Mission Beach
1998	Super Bowl XXXII	NFL	Football	Qualcomm Stadium
1998	Summer X Games IV	X Games	Extreme	San Diego
1998	1998 World Series (94th) games 3 & 4	MLB	Baseball	Qualcomm Stadium
1999	1999 MLS All-Star Game (4th)	MLS	Soccer	Qualcomm Stadium
2001	2001 NCAA Division I women's volleyball tournament Final Four	NCAA D-I	Volleyball	Cox Arena
2003	Super Bowl XXXVII	NFL	Football	Qualcomm Stadium
2006	2006 World Baseball Classic (inaugural) championship	WBC	Baseball	Petco Park
2008	2008 U.S. Open (108th)	PGA Tour	Golf	Torrey Pines Golf Course
2009	2009 World Baseball Classic (2nd) second round	WBC	Baseball	Petco Park
2010	UFC Live: Jones vs. Matyushenko	UFC	MMA	San Diego Sports Arena
2011	2011 Carrier Classic	NCAA D-I	Basketball	USS Carl Vinson
2012	2012 Carrier Classic	NCAA D-I	Basketball	USS Midway
2015	UFC Fight Night: Mir vs. Duffee	UFC	MMA	Valley View Casino Center
2016	2016 MLB All-Star Game (87th)	MLB	Baseball	Petco Park
2017	2017 World Baseball Classic (4th) second round	WBC	Baseball	Petco Park
2017	2017 Tournament of Nations (inaugural)	FIFA	Soccer	Qualcomm Stadium
2020	2020 USA Cross Country Championships (130th)	USATF	Cross country	Mission Bay Park
2020	2020 ALDS & ALCS	MLB	Baseball	Petco Park
2021	2021 U.S. Open (121st)	PGA Tour	Golf	Torrey Pines Golf Course
2021	X Games Southern California 2021	X Games	Extreme	Vista
2021	2021 San Diego Open	ATP Tour	Tennis	Barnes Tennis Center
2022	2022 USA Cross Country Championships (131st)	USATF	Cross country	Mission Bay Park
2022	UFC on ESPN: Vera vs. Cruz	UFC	MMA	Pechanga Arena
2022	2022 San Diego Open	ATP Tour	Tennis	Barnes Tennis Center
2022	2022 Carrier Classic	NCAA D-I	Basketball	USS Abraham Lincoln
2023	2023 World Lacrosse Championship	WL	Lacrosse	Snapdragon Stadium
2023	2023 CONCACAF Gold Cup semi-final	CONCACAF	Soccer	Snapdragon Stadium
2023	2023 NWSL Championship	NWSL	Soccer	Snapdragon Stadium
2024	2024 CONCACAF W Gold Cup group stage, semi-finals & final	CONCACAF	Soccer	Snapdragon Stadium

== See also ==
- Sports in Los Angeles
- Sports in the New York metropolitan area
- Sports in the San Francisco Bay Area
