= Tiger's Lair =

University of Missouri's football student section

Tiger's Lair is the official football student section for the University of Missouri. It consists of 1800 students, along with an executive board consisting of a director, game day chair, spirit chairs, special events chairs, travel chair, social media chair, and photographer. Tiger's Lair is a part of Mizzou Spirit, a part of student activities at the university. This program is headed by its director. Sign-ups for the section are before the first week of classes at the Midnight Barbecue. Members often wear costumes and other outfits to games, including overalls, helmets, and football pads. The first 60 students in line are allowed to stand in the front row, and become a part of the front-row saying, which is painted on each person's chest. Coordinators then paint that week's saying.

The section sits on the east side of the stadium, commonly referred to as the "Student Side". Sections GG, HH, II, and JJ of the student side are the sections allotted to Tiger's Lair members. The section is visible from aerial cameras as a "gold section," as students are required to wear their Tiger's Lair shirt to gain entry to the section before games. At the beginning of every game, the section raises a black flag with a gold "M" on it, while Truman the Tiger rides a fire truck to the section and sprays the fans with a fire hose. For certain games during the season, Tiger's Lair does card stunts during halftime and waves an American flag. This tradition has become a favorite of alumni, who sit opposite the section.

== History ==
On August 1, 1995, Mizzou Spirit was founded with the creation of Tiger's Lair. At the time, the Missouri Tigers football team averaged three wins per season, and the section was created to boost student morale and attendance. The solution was to create an organization to bring the most spirited fans together at football games. The first year after its creation, the average attendance at football games jumped from around 33,000 to 39,000, and in its second year, attendance jumped to an average of 52,500 fans.

In 2007, the section expanded to its largest size to 1,111 members. In 2008, there were 1,500 members in the section. In 2009, there were approximately 1,600 members. In 2015, the section expanded to 1,800 members.
