= I believe that we will win! =

American sports chant

"I believe that we will win!" is a chant commonly performed at American sporting events. Originating in the Naval Academy Preparatory School, it became a tradition among fans and students of the United States Naval Academy, with other schools later also adapting the phrase. In 2014, the chant gained national recognition as a rallying call among United States men's national soccer team (USMNT) fans for the 2014 FIFA World Cup, becoming an unofficial motto of The American Outlaws supporters' group.

The chant is a call and response interaction between two parties. It begins with one call of "I", "I believe", followed by "I believe that", and "I believe that we", before concluding with repeated shouts of "I believe that we will win!"

== History ==
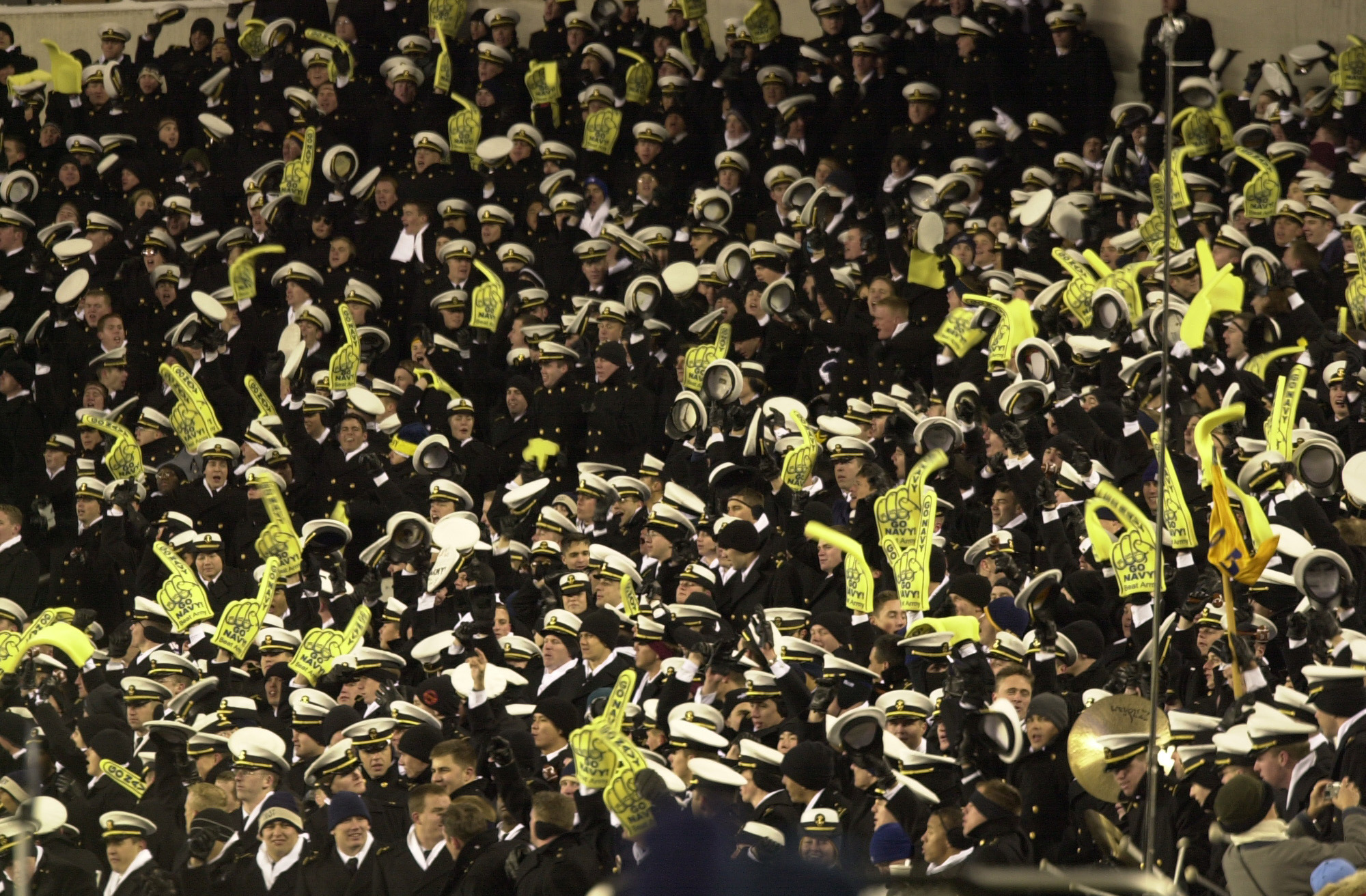
The Brigade of Midshipmen cheer during the 2003 Army–Navy Game. In the buildup to the game, the school sold T-shirts containing "I believe that we will win!".

In 1998, Naval Academy Preparatory School (NAPS) student Jay Rodriguez was assigned to create a chant to be used by his platoon and came up with "I believe that we will win!". It was first used during a NAPS basketball game against the United States Military Academy Preparatory School in Newport, Rhode Island. A year later, now a Naval Academy student, Rodriguez taught it to his classmate, cheerleader Corey Strong, who began using it during the 1999 Army–Navy Game; in the fourth quarter of the 19–9 Navy victory, Strong led the 4,000-student Brigade of Midshipmen in the chant. In 2003, the Midshipmen team showed marked improvement over their 3–30 record in the last three years; during a game against the No. 25-ranked Air Force Falcons at FedExField, Navy students began reciting the chant as the Midshipmen won 28–25. In preparation for the Army–Navy Game later that year, Navy sold T-shirts with the phrase written on them. The chant is currently performed by midshipmen in the closing stages of a victory.

The chant eventually spread to other college sports, with fans of the Utah State Aggies men's basketball team adopting its usage in 2009. The Show of San Diego State University and Harvard Crimson students also performed it during games. Fans of various soccer clubs have also recited it, including the New York Red Bulls of Major League Soccer and French team FC Nantes. During the 2016 Ryder Cup, "U-S-A!" chants by American fans interspersed with calls of "I believe that we will win!"

=== United States soccer ===
According to Justin Brunken, co-founder of the U.S. soccer supporters' group The American Outlaws, he first heard the chant during a 2011 U.S. soccer game in Kansas City. He described it as "a chant that just grew from there and caught on and on. It resonated with the crowds across the country and became synonymous with what we believe in." It eventually became a rallying call by fans of the United States national men's soccer team (USMNT). For the 2014 FIFA World Cup, ESPN used the chant in two commercials promoting the Cup, one depicting The American Outlaws and the other featuring figures like Kevin Costner, Ice Cube and Barry Sanders. The cheer was also acknowledged by members of the USMNT, with goalkeeper Tim Howard posting it on his Twitter and receiving almost 60,000 retweets during the 2014 World Cup, Alejandro Bedoya leading FC Nantes fans in it after home games, and former captain Landon Donovan doing so prior to the 2015 FIFA Women's World Cup final. The United States women's national soccer team went on to win the Cup after defeating Japan.

During the 2015 World Cup victory parade for the United States women's national soccer team (USWNT), forward Abby Wambach led fans in a modified call of "I believe that we just won!"

=== San Diego State University trademark ===
Strong, who was taught the chant by Rodriguez, was later stationed in San Diego and earned his Master of Business Administration at San Diego State University (SDSU). In 2011, SDSU clothing store Aztec Shops Ltd. attempted to trademark the phrase. Strong opposed the trademark, stating "everybody would be best served if they removed their attempt to trademark the cheer" and that the Naval Academy would be resisting it. In 2017, the Trademark Trial and Appeal Board rejected the trademark, saying it had been "widely used over a long period of time by various groups."

=== Other sports ===
In 2014, Oakland Athletics fans regaled first baseman Stephen Vogt with a chant inspired by "I believe that we will win!", titled "I believe in Stephen Vogt!"

In 2018, FiveThirtyEight referenced the chant in the title of an article about American's success in recent golf tournaments.

=== Non-sports usage ===
After the death of Osama bin Laden in 2011, the Naval Academy celebrated with Commandant Robert E. Clark II. Clark led the midshipmen in a modified chant of "I believe that we have won!"

The chant has also seen use in protest, such as during the Occupy Wall Street march in 2011. The Florida-based organization Dream Defenders adopted the phrase for protests following the 2012 killing of Trayvon Martin, used during a protest at the Florida state capital in 2012. Phil Agnew of the Dream Defenders also led the chant during the 50th anniversary of the "March on Washington for Jobs and Freedom" in 2013, leading to its nationwide prominence during Black Lives Matter protests between 2012 and 2016.

On April 13, 2020, Pitbull released a promotional single titled "I Believe That We Will Win (World Anthem)" (which samples the "I believe that we will win!" chant) in response to the COVID-19 pandemic. The song inspires those affected by the COVID-19 outbreak to lift themselves up and rise above the situation. The promotional single was premiered in full on April 12 on the virtual TrillerFest, and made its TV debut on April 13 on Good Morning America. An accompanying music video was also released. Pitbull is donating all proceeds from song sales, streaming, and views to COVID-19 affiliated nonprofits.

== See also ==
- Football chant
