= Naval Academy Preparatory School =

Preparatory school for the United States Naval Academy

Coordinates: 41.518399°N 71.323254°W

Naval Academy Prep School
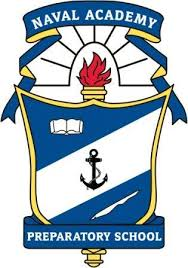
- Crest of the Naval Academy Preparatory School
- Motto: Success from Knowledge (Ex Scienta, Succesus)
- Type: Federal military academy prep school
- Established: 1915
- Parent institution: United States Naval Academy
- Commanding Officer: Captain Thomas E. Clarity, USN (2023–present)
- Administrative staff: around 20 military faculty and around 40 civilian employees
- Students: approximately 250 students
- Location: Newport, Rhode Island, United States
- Campus: At Naval Station Newport
- Colors: Navy blue █ and gold █
- Website: www.usna.edu/naps

The Naval Academy Preparatory School or NAPS is the preparatory school for the United States Naval Academy (USNA). NAPS is located on Naval Station Newport, Rhode Island. The mission of the Naval Academy Preparatory School is "To enhance Midshipman Candidates' moral, mental, and physical foundations to prepare them for success at the United States Naval Academy".

== History ==
The Naval Academy Preparatory School is the Navy's fourth oldest school; only the Naval War College, the Naval Postgraduate School, and the United States Naval Academy at Annapolis, Maryland are older. Informal preparatory classes began as early as 1915.

In 1918, the Secretary of the Navy Josephus Daniels signed a provision to have up to 100 sailors from the fleet to be eligible for entry to the Academy. Due to the difficult nature of the Naval Academy's entrance examination, then Undersecretary of the Navy Franklin D. Roosevelt (future 32nd President) also allowed for a school to be founded to prepare Sailors and Marines for entry.

The first official classes were established at Naval Station, Newport in Rhode Island and Naval Station Treasure Island / San Francisco in California in 1920. A year later the schools were moved to Norfolk, Virginia and San Diego, California. San Diego classes were later disestablished and NAPS classes remained solely in Norfolk until 1942, when the new Naval Academy Preparatory School opened in Newport, Rhode Island.

In early 1943, NAPS moved to the United States Naval Training Center Bainbridge, a facility of several hundred acres located above the Susquehanna River in Port Deposit, Maryland at the former Tome School campus, some 40 miles (64 km) northeast of Baltimore, Maryland. NAPS returned to Newport while the Bainbridge Center was temporarily inactive during 15 months around 1950. When Bainbridge was reactivated in 1951 because of the Korean War, the preparatory school returned to Maryland. In August 1974, NAPS returned to its permanent home in Newport and in 2006, named their newly built dormitory in honor of alumnus Colonel John Ripley.

From 1915 to 1968 NAPS was exclusively for Sailors and Marines who were of "Officer Caliber" but lacked the academic foundation for the rigors at the USNA. In 1968, the first male "Direct Entries" were admitted to NAPS. Following the congressional authorization of women to attend all military service academies, women were admitted in 1976.

Although NAPS primarily serves as an institution to prepare midshipman candidates to attend the USNA; from the years 1958 to 2008 it also began to prepare cadet candidates for the United States Air Force Academy (1958–1961) and the United States Coast Guard Academy (1979–2008, 2016–present) and, midshipman candidates for the United States Merchant Marine Academy (1991 to 2004).

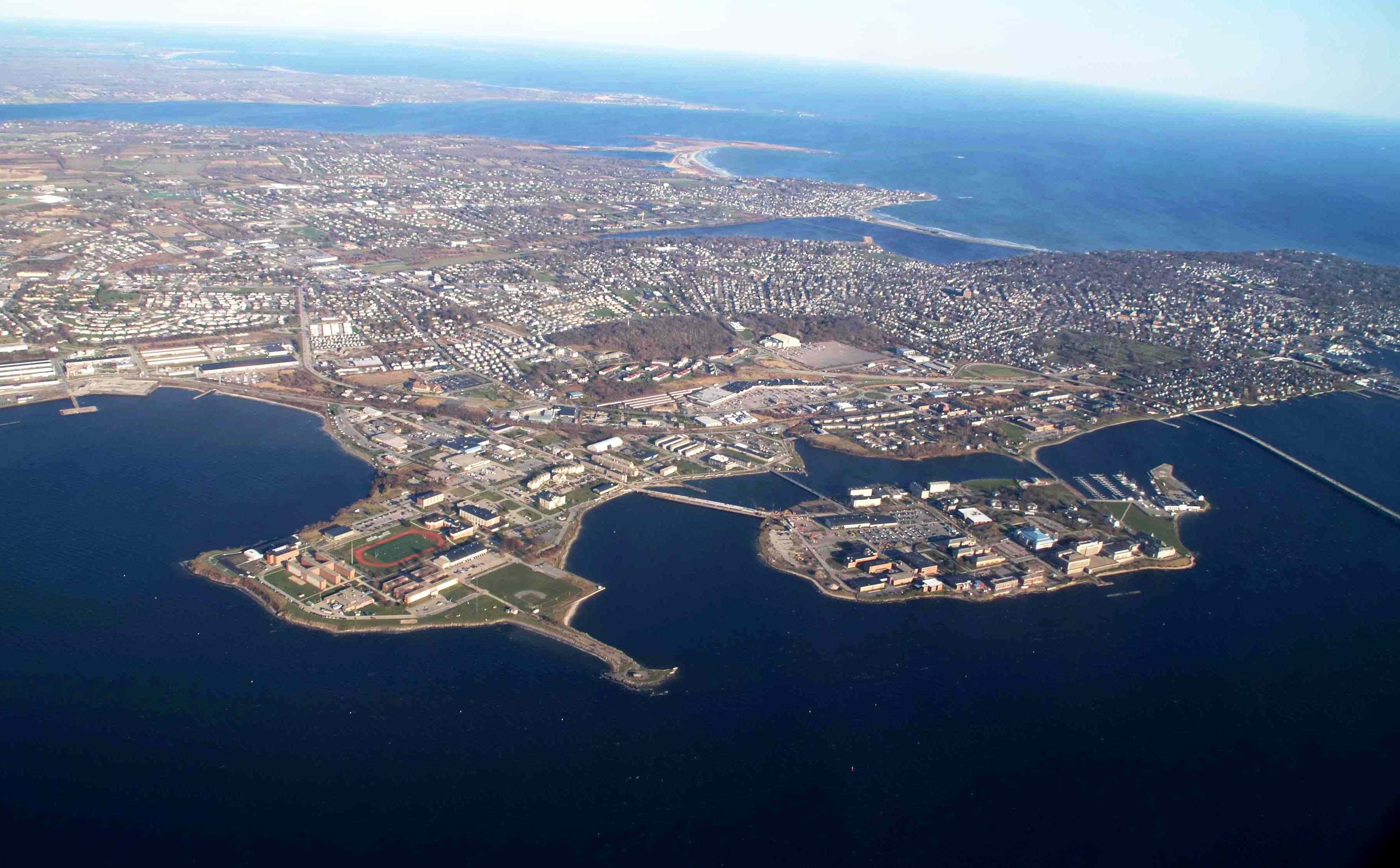
Aerial view of Naval Station Newport

== Admissions ==
Admission to NAPS is based on application to USNA; USNA may offer assignment to NAPS to some applicants who otherwise would be accepted but require additional academic preparation and will be no younger than 17 years of age and not yet 23 years of age when NAPS Indoctrination begins. (The same is true for a small number applications via the United States Coast Guard.)

To gain admission to their respective academies upon graduation, midshipman/cadet candidates must have a grade point average (GPA) above 2.2, no failing grade in any subject, meet the body fat standards, pass the USNA's Physical Readiness Test (PRT), improving or sustained course grades and SAT scores, favorable conduct and honor aptitude, and get a favorable recommendation from the Commanding Officer.

Midshipman candidates who might be below the standard may still have a chance of admission to the USNA. After finals are over, their fate is decided on a day known as Black Monday.

== Organization ==
Students standing in formation.

The student body, organized as a battalion, is divided into three companies, which are then divided into two platoons. Each platoon is divided into four squads in order to carry out orders with effective results. While attending NAPS, all midshipman candidates, affectionately known as "NAPSters", are on active duty military status, holding the rank of Midshipman Candidate, equivalent to the Navy's Seaman Recruit, at the enlisted pay grade of E-1, although this is significantly reduced in an effort to allocate funds into the Battalion Activity Fund (BAF) and to pay off all debts owed due for issued uniforms and miscellaneous items. The BAF is used to pay for physical fitness clothing and equipment, textbooks and various student activity expenses, such as the Army-Navy game, Graduation Ball and the like.

Within the battalion there exists a midshipman candidate-led chain of command. Those holding positions of authority are called "stripers", because they wear collar devices with the number of stripes that are assigned to each position. Stripers are selected by the senior military staff and serve the term of one marking period, after which they rotate out with new midshipmen candidates. The responsibilities of stripers are: delegating orders from the senior military staff to the students, taking accountability of the battalion, writing the watchbill for other students, organizing their respective companies and platoons for each event the midshipmen candidates attend, and maintaining general cleanliness of Ripley Hall. The head of the entire battalion is the Battalion Commander, Battalion Executive Officer (XO), and MA. The Battalion XO is in charge of Taps sheets, a nightly process that ensures all midshipman/cadet candidates are accounted.

== Athletics ==
NAPS athletics consist of football, lacrosse, men's and women's basketball, baseball, wrestling, men's and women's track & field, and men's and women's cross country running. Most of the athletes will move on to their respective sports at either the USNA or the USCGA after successful completion of their year at NAPS. Midshipmen candidates that are not on any of the school teams, as well as athletes during their sports off-season, must participate in daily physical training. Each midshipman candidate will take the USNA's Physical Readiness Test (PRT), four times throughout the school year. The midshipman candidate must pass the PRT in order to move on to the USNA or the USCGA.

In 1998, a NAPS platoon created the chant I believe that we will win! and used it at NAPS sporting events. Those NAPSters then brought the chant with them to the USNA where the cheer team adopted it for its sporting events.

== Notable alumni ==
- Commander Ernest E. Evans, USN (KIA) - NAPS 1927, USNA 1931, commander USS Johnston, posthumous Medal of Honor recipient
- Captain William Lederer, USN (ret.) - 1930/1931 NAPS, USNA 1936, author, former special assistant, United States Indo-Pacific Command
- Colonel John Ripley, USMC (ret.) - NAPS 1958, USNA 1962, 2nd Force Reconnaissance Company, Navy Cross recipient and posthumous Medal of Honor recipient
- Captain Lance Sijan, USAF - NAPS 1961, USAFA 1965, Vietnam War POW, posthumous Medal of Honor recipient
- General Michael J. Williams, USMC (ret.) - NAPS 1963, USNA 1967, former Assistant Commandant of the Marine Corps
- General John R. Allen, USMC (ret.) - NAPS 1972, USNA 1976, former commander, ISAF and Operation Resolute Support
- Admiral Samuel J. Locklear, III, USN (ret.) - NAPS 1973, USNA 1977, former commander, United States Indo-Pacific Command
- Vice Admiral Robert Harward, USN (ret.) - NAPS 1975, USNA 1979, SEAL Team 3, former deputy commander, United States Central Command
- Lieutenant Commander Montel Williams USN/USMC (ret.) - NAPS 1976, USNA 1980, former naval cryptologic officer, television host
- Rear Admiral Peter Gumataotao, USN (ret.) - NAPS 1977, USNA 1981, former commander, Naval Surface Force Atlantic
- Vice Admiral Tim Szymanski, USN (ret.) - NAPS 1981, USNA 1985, former deputy commander, United States Special Operations Command
- Lieutenant General Matthew G. Glavy, USMC - NAPS 1982, USNA 1986, Deputy Commandant for Information
- Major General Austin E. Renforth, USMC (ret.) - NAPS 1984, USNA 1988, former commanding general, Marine Corps Air Ground Combat Center
- Captain Christopher J. Cassidy, USN (ret.) - NAPS 1989, USNA 1993, SEAL Team 3, NASA astronaut
- First Lieutenant Malcolm Perry, USMC - USNA 2020, retired NFL player, aircraft maintenance officer

== Notable Past Military Staff ==
- General James Mattis, USMC (ret.) - Executive Officer, 1981-1983
