= San Diego Figure Skating Club =

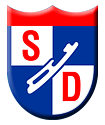
- San Diego Figure Skating Club logo
- Formation: 1939
- Location: San Diego, California
- Parent organization: US Figure Skating Association
- Affiliations: Southern California Inter Club Association
- Website: www.sandiegofsc.org
- Remarks: Synchro: Team del Sol

The San Diego Figure Skating Club was a figure skating club based in San Diego, California. It was established in 1939, received its charter from the United States Figure Skating Association and registered its Articles of Corporation on July 27, 1940, in the state of California.

The club’s purpose was to foster, promote, encourage, advance and improve the art of and interest in figure skating, and to encourage and to cultivate a spirit of harmony and friendship among ice skaters by such means as may be proposed from time to time by the membership. It was one of the oldest skating clubs in California.

== Home rinks ==
Glacier Gardens served as the first home rink for the San Diego Figure Skating Club. When Glacier Gardens closed as a skating venue in December 1954, club members skated at a number of smaller studio rinks including the Sonald Studio (1955–1959), located at Midway Drive and Fordham Street, Iceland (1960–1965), located at Lake Murray Boulevard and El Paso Street and the Mission Valley Ice Arena (1965–1969). In April 1969, the House of Ice, located on Lake Murray Boulevard in La Mesa, California, opened and became the home rink for the club. Within a year, membership doubled, enabling the club to return to full USFSA Club status. The San Diego Ice Arena in Mira Mesa, California, served as the club’s home rink with the Kroc Center Ice Arena in La Mesa functioning as a secondary training rink.

== Competitions ==
The San Diego Figure Skating Club hosted its annual competition, Skate LaGrande, each spring.

The club has also hosted multiple state, regional, sectional and national championship competitions, including:

- 1946 California State Championships
- 1949 Pacific Coast Sectional Figure Skating Championships
- 1952 California State Championships
- 1975 Pacific Coast Sectional Figure Skating Championships
- 1978 Southwest Pacific Regional Figure Skating Championships
- 1981 United States Figure Skating Championships
- 1984 Pacific Coast Precision Sectional Championships
- 1988 Pacific Coast Precision Sectional Championships
- 1992 Pacific Coast Precision Sectional Championships
- 1995 United States Precision Team Skating Championships
- 1997 Southwest Pacific Regional Figure Skating Championships
- 1998 United States Precision Team Skating Championships
- 2003 Pacific Coast Synchronized Sectional Championships
- 2004 United States Synchronized Team Skating Championships

== Notable skaters and coaches ==
Janet Champion was the first San Diego Figure Skating Club competitor to gain attention for her talent. In the 1950s, the young skater won the California State Exchange Club Contest but her acceptance of the cash prize ended her amateur status. At the age of ten she signed a contract with the Ice Follies and began a nine-year career as a professional skater. After transitioning to Holiday on Ice and touring for a few more years, Champion returned to San Diego and began her coaching career. Cindy Moyers (Stuart), one of her first students, placed third in the Junior Ladies event at the 1975 United States Figure Skating Championships, giving the club its first national medal. While coaching in San Diego, Champion also worked with 1976 Olympic Champion John Curry and National Champions Linda Fratianne and Rosalynn Sumners. Janet Champion also coached Tiffany Chin to her National Junior title and World Junior win.

Other notable skaters who have trained at or represented the San Diego Figure Skating Club include: Olympians John Baldwin, Jr., Tiffany Chin and Todd Eldredge and national and international competitors John Baldwin, Sr. and Rory Flack.

Current coaches at the club include Russian Junior National Champion in singles and pairs Natasha Borbrina, 4-time French national champion and 2-time Olympian Eric Millot. Longtime coach Yuri Ovchinnikov was on a four-year assignment with the Russian Olympic Committee in preparation for the 2014 Sochi Winter Olympic Games.

== Synchronized skating team ==
The San Diego Figure Skating Club was affiliated with synchronized skating teams for over fifty years. For many years, the Starlites and the Sun Blazers competed at the juvenile level and the intermediate/novice level respectively. The Icettes represented the Club at the junior level, competing at the senior level in 1996. In 1997, all three teams consolidated and changed the name to Team del Sol. The name, which translates to Team of the Sun, reflects San Diego’s Spanish heritage. At the 2013 US Synchronized Skating Championships, Team del Sol won first place at the intermediate level.
