= Frontwave Arena =

Indoor arena in Oceanside, California

- "The Wavehouse"

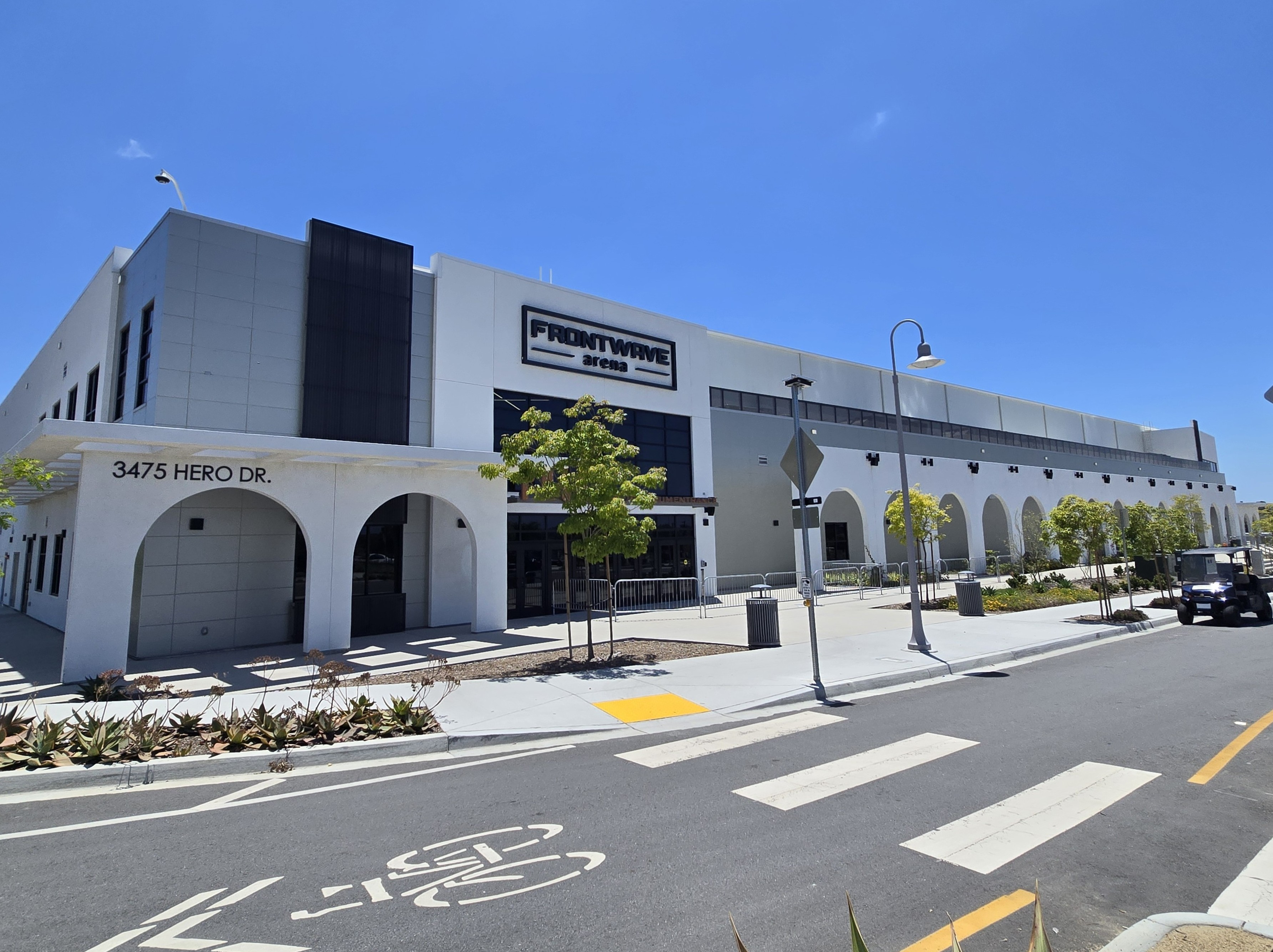
- Frontwave Arena in 2026
- Interactive map of Frontwave Arena
- Address: 3475 Hero Drive
- Location: Oceanside, California, U.S.
- Coordinates: 33°12′28″N 117°18′53″W
- Owner: Oside Arena Holdings, LLC
- Operator: Frontwave Arena Management
- Capacity: Basketball: 6,000; Indoor soccer: 5,500; Concerts: Up to 7,500
- Field size: 170,000 sq ft (16,000 m^{2})
- Public transit: Rancho Del Oro

Construction
- Groundbreaking: May 20, 2021
- Opened: September 16, 2024
- Cost: $100 million
- Architect: ICON Architectural Group
- Structural engineer: WorkPoint Engineering
- General contractor: Level 10 Construction

Tenants
- San Diego Clippers (NBA G League) (2024–present); San Diego Sockers (MASL) (2024–present); San Diego Strike Force (IFL) (2025–present); Oceanside Bombers (AF1) (2026); Oceanside Shock (FPHL) (2026–present); San Diego Seals (NLL) (2026–present)

Website
- frontwavearena.com

Frontwave Arena is an indoor arena in Oceanside, California. Opened in 2024, it is the home of the San Diego Clippers of the NBA G League, San Diego Sockers of the Major Arena Soccer League (MASL), San Diego Strike Force of the Indoor Football League (IFL), San Diego Seals of the National Lacrosse League (NLL), and the Oceanside Shock of the Federal Prospects Hockey League (FPHL).

== History ==
Frontwave Arena is the first large multi-purpose indoor entertainment venue in the North County area of San Diego County. In 2022, a 10-year naming rights agreement with Oceanside-headquartered Frontwave Credit Union was announced, giving the arena its official name.

The arena opened on September 16, 2024, for the Gold Over America Tour. On October 5, the arena held its inaugural concert headlined by Cake. On October 8, the Los Angeles Clippers held the arena's first-ever basketball game, where they defeated the visiting Brooklyn Nets 115–106 in the preseason.
