= 2016 San Diego Aviators season =

World TeamTennis champions
- World TeamTennis: 1st place

Record
- 2016 record: 8 wins, 4 losses
- Home record: 6 wins, 0 losses
- Road record: 2 wins, 4 losses
- Games won–lost: 249–228

Team info
- Owner(s): Fred Luddy (majority); Jack McGrory (minority)
- General manager: Jim Ault
- Coach: John Lloyd; Jim Ault (assistant)
- Stadium: Omni La Costa Resort and Spa (capacity: 2,100)

The 2016 San Diego Aviators season was the 22nd season of the franchise in World TeamTennis (WTT) and its third playing in San Diego County, California.

Led by 2016 WTT Male Most Valuable Player, Ryan Harrison, and Coach of the Year John Lloyd, the Aviators had 8 wins and 4 losses, the best regular-season record in WTT. They went on to defeat the Orange County Breakers, 25–14 in extended play, in the WTT Finals to win the King Trophy as WTT champions. Raven Klaasen was named WTT Finals Most Valuable Player. The league title was the third in franchise history and the first since moving to San Diego.

== Season recap ==
=== Front-office changes ===
Jim Ault was named the new general manager and assistant head coach of the Aviators with Tamara Sarafijanovic as assistant general manager.

Prior to the start of the 2016 season, Billy Berger's name no longer appeared on the team's website as CEO or minority owner.

=== New logo ===
On February 29, 2016, the Aviators started using a new logo on their website and Facebook page. The new logo retains the use of red and white that was featured in the 2015 logo.

=== Draft ===
James Blake, who played for the team as a wildcard in 2015, was assigned by WTT to Aviators as a designated player. He was selected with the Aviators' first pick in the marquee player portion of the draft. The Aviators did not protect 2015 marquee player Madison Keys, and they did not make a selection in the second round of the marquee player portion of the draft. In the roster portion of the draft, the Aviators protected Raven Klaasen and Darija Jurak. They chose Shelby Rogers with their first-round selection, leaving 2015 amateur and winner of the 2015 US Open boys' singles title, but now turned professional, Taylor Fritz unprotected. The protection of Jurak and the selection of Rogers also meant that the Aviators could not protect Květa Peschke, the last remaining member of the team who played for the franchise when it was known as the New York Sportimes, and Chanelle Scheepers. The Aviators chose Daniel Evans with their third-round selection in the roster player portion of the draft. They elected not to select a roster-exempt player in the fifth round.

=== Harrison replaces Evans ===
On July 8, 2016, Daniel Evans withdrew from WTT. On July 15, 2016, the Aviators announced the signing of Ryan Harrison as a roster player to fill the spot created by Evans's departure.

=== A rivalry is born ===
The Aviators opened their season with a four-game series against the Orange County Breakers, who were returning to Southern California after playing the previous two seasons as the Austin Aces. When the Breakers last called Orange County their home in 2013, the Aviators had not yet moved to California and were known as the New York Sportimes. While the teams did not have any history as geographic rivals, the franchises did meet in the 2005 WTT Finals with the Sportimes earning the title with a 21–18 victory over the Newport Beach Breakers. The two franchises also boasted the best regular-season records in WTT over the past two seasons with the Aviators achieving the feat in 2014, and the Aces doing so in 2015.

The Aviators hosted the opening match on July 31, 2016. After dropping the first two sets, including a loss by James Blake in the opening set of men's singles, the Aviators regrouped and won the next two sets of men's and women's doubles to tie the match at 15 all. It was Blake and Raven Klaasen in the men's doubles set and Darija Jurak and Shelby Rogers in women's doubles. The teams exchanged breaks in the final set of mixed doubles, before Jurak and Klaasen won the set tiebreaker, 5–2, to give the Aviators a 20–19 victory.

The following evening, the Breakers hosted the Aviators in their first home match in Orange County since 2013. For the second straight match, the Breakers won the first two sets to take an early lead, and the Aviators responded with set wins in men's and women's doubles. Klaasen and Ryan Harrison won the men's doubles, and Jurak and Rogers won the women's doubles. The Aviators faced a 17–16 deficit heading into the final set of men's singles. After the players each held serve in three of their four service games, Steve Johnson secured a 22–20 victory for the Breakers by winning a tiebreaker over Harrison.

The teams returned to Carlsbad for the third match of their series on August 2, 2016. This time, the Aviators dominated play in the early part of the match. Harrison won the men's singles set, 5–2. Rogers followed with a 5–1 set win in women's singles. Harrison teamed with Klaasen for a 5–2 set win in men's doubles, and the Aviators had a 15–5 lead after three sets. After the Breakers won the fourth set of women's doubles to cut the lead to 18–10, they sent the match to extended play by winning a fifth-set tiebreaker in mixed doubles. However, the Aviators broke Alla Kudryavtseva's serve in the first game of extended play to secure a 23–15 victory.

The following evening in Orange County, the Breakers won the opening set of men's doubles, and the Aviators responded by winning the next three sets, two of them in tiebreakers, to take a 17–16 lead to the final set. Rogers and Harrison won the women's and men's singles, and Klaasen and Jurak followed with a set win in mixed doubles. However, Jurak and Rogers fell behind a break early in the fifth set of women's doubles and were unable to break back. The 5–2 set win gave the Breakers a 21–19 victory. The four matches in four nights ended in a split and had quickly developed the feel of a rivalry. "It definitely starts to get a little personal," said the Breakers' Nicole Gibbs. "Things got a little feisty tonight, so it was a good night to bring the cameras. We were getting in each other's faces, and there were some big 'Come ons'. Definitely some emotional moments."

=== Winning streak ===
Following the series with the Breakers, the Aviators opened a four-match home-stand by hosting the expansion New York Empire on August 5, 2016. Ryan Harrison won the opening set of men's singles in a tiebreaker and teamed with Raven Klaasen for a 5–2 set win in the third set of men's doubles. Shelby Rogers won the second set of women's singles in a tiebreaker. Klaasen teamed with Darija Jurak to take the final set of mixed doubles, 5–3, and seal a 24–18 victory.

The following day, the Aviators signed Ernests Gulbis as a substitute player.

Gulbis opened the Aviators' match that evening against the five-time defending WTT champion Washington Kastles by taking the men's singles set, 5–2. He later paired with Klaasen for a 5–2 set win in the third set of men's doubles. Jurak teamed with Rogers to take the fourth set of women's doubles and with Klaasen to take the fifth set of mixed doubles, both by 5–3 scores, to give the Aviators a 21–15 win.

The Aviators got off to a quick start the following evening as Harrison won the opening set of men's singles, Rogers won the second set of women's singles, and Harrison and Klaasen took the third set of men's doubles to build a 15–8 lead against the Springfield Lasers. The Lasers battled back, winning the fourth set of women's doubles in a tiebreaker and the fifth set of mixed doubles, 5–2, to send the match to extended play with the Aviators leading, 21–18. After the Lasers held serve in the first game of extended play, Klaasen held serve to clinch a 22–19 Aviators victory.

On August 8, 2016, the Aviators hosted the Philadelphia Freedoms in their final home match of the season. Harrison won the opening set of men's singles and teamed with Klaasen to take the third set of men's doubles. Rogers posted a 5–0 set win in the second set of women's singles. After the Freedoms won the fourth and fifth sets, Klaasen, playing mixed doubles with Jurak, held serve in the opening game of extended play to secure a 23–15 win and a perfect home record of 6 wins and 0 losses.

The Aviators opened their season-ending four-match road trip against the Kastles. Rogers won the second set of women's singles, 5–3, over Madison Brengle and then teamed with Jurak to win a tiebreaker in the fourth set of women's doubles that gave the Aviators an 18–17 lead. Harrison won the final set of men's singles, 5–3, to seal a 23–20 victory, the fifth straight for the Aviators, and improve the team's record to 7 wins and 2 losses.

=== WTT Finals berth ===
After a loss to the Springfield Lasers, the Aviators headed to Forest Hills Stadium for their first match in New York City since July 23, 2013, when they were the home team playing as the New York Sportimes. Players appearing in that 23–15 overtime loss to the Washington Kastles for the Sportimes were Anna-Lena Grönefeld, Robert Kendrick, Květa Peschke and Jesse Witten. But on August 12, 2016, the Aviators would be the road team facing the New York Empire. The Aviators won four of the five sets led by Ryan Harrison who won the opening set of men's singles and teamed with Raven Klaasen to close out the match in the final set of men's doubles. Darija Jurak paired with Klaasen to win the third set of mixed doubles and with Shelby Rogers to win the fourth set of women's doubles. The 24–16 victory gave the Aviators 8 wins and 3 losses and clinched their berth in the WTT Finals. It was the first Finals appearance for the franchise since 2010, when they lost playing as the New York Sportimes and the first postseason appearance for the Aviators since 2014.

On August 13, 2016, the Aviators signed Nick Monroe as a substitute player to fill in for Harrison in the final match of the regular season.

During their final regular-season match against the Philadelphia Freedoms, the Aviators clinched the best overall record in WTT, when the Washington Kastles defeated the Orange County Breakers, 25–19 in extended play. The Aviators later lost their match against the Freedoms to fall to 8 wins and 4 losses, an identical record to that of the Breakers. Since the teams split their four matches during the regular season, the tie in the standings was broken by most games won in head-to-head matches, which favored the Aviators, 82–77. Being the top seed in the WTT Finals resulted in the Aviators being treated as the home team and having the option to set the order of play.

=== Harrison named MVP and Lloyd Coach of the Year ===
Ryan Harrison was named 2016 WTT Male Most Valuable Player. Harrison led the league in winning percentage in men's singles and was also second in men's doubles behind teammate Raven Klaasen. John Lloyd was named 2016 WTT Coach of the Year.

=== WTT Finals ===
The Aviators met their new rivals, the Orange County Breakers, in the WTT Finals on August 26, 2016, at Forest Hills Stadium in New York City. The Aviators won the first four sets, all by 5–2 scores. Darija Jurak and Raven Klaasen opened with a set win in mixed doubles. Shelby Rogers followed by beating 2016 WTT Female Most Valuable Player Nicole Gibbs in women's singles. Klaasen teamed with Ryan Harrison in men's doubles. Jurak and Rogers took the fourth set of women's doubles to give the Aviators a 20–8 lead. Dennis Novikov won a tiebreaker against Harrison in the final set of men's singles to send the match to extended play with the Aviators leading 24–13. Novikov held serve in the opening game of extended play. However, Harrison, who won a US Open qualifying match earlier in the day to secure a spot in the Grand Slam tournament, held serve in the second game, giving the Aviators a 25–14 victory and the 2016 King Trophy. It was the third WTT championship in franchise history and the first since moving to San Diego. The previous titles came in 2005, playing as the New York Sportimes and in 2008, playing as the New York Buzz. It was the first time in franchise history that the Aviators finished with WTT's best regular-season record and followed up by winning the league championship. Klaasen was named WTT Finals Most Valuable Player. "It feels really nice to get the MVP award, but it feels a bit undeserving, because our whole team played very well," said Klaasen. "We were apart for four days, and when we saw each other again last night, it felt like we had been apart for a year. Our team chemistry has been great. We will be friends for the rest of our lives." Aviators coach John Lloyd said, "It brings a lot of memories back; I played back in the US Open, when it was on grass and clay. In fact, on this court I lost to the great Björn Borg. It was nice to play on this beautiful court. To come back and win this title was great."

== Event chronology ==
- March 25, 2016: The Aviators protected Raven Klaasen and Darija Jurak and selected James Blake, Shelby Rogers and Daniel Evans at the WTT Draft. The Aviators left Taylor Fritz, Květa Peschke and Chanelle Scheepers unprotected.
- July 8, 2016: Daniel Evans withdrew from WTT for undisclosed reasons.
- July 15, 2016: The Aviators signed Ryan Harrison as a roster player.
- August 6, 2016: The Aviators signed Ernests Gulbis as a substitute player.
- August 12, 2016: With a record of 8 wins and 3 losses, the Aviators clinched a berth in the WTT Finals with a 24–16 road victory against the New York Empire.
- August 13, 2016: The Aviators signed Nick Monroe as a substitute player.
- August 13, 2016: With a record of 8 wins and 3 losses, the Aviators clinched the best regular-season record in WTT, when the Washington Kastles defeated the Orange County Breakers, 25–19, in extended play.
- August 26, 2016: The Aviators won the King Trophy as WTT champions, when they defeated the Orange County Breakers, 25–14 in extended play, in the WTT Finals. It is the third WTT championship for the franchise and the first since moving to San Diego.

== Draft picks ==
Since the Aviators had the second-worst record among WTT's nonplayoff teams in 2015, they selected second in each round of the draft. The league conducted its 2016 draft on March 25, in Key Biscayne, Florida. James Blake, who played for the team as a wildcard in 2015, was assigned by WTT to the Aviators as a designated player. The selections made by the Aviators are shown in the table below.

Draft type	Round	No.	Overall	Player chosen	Prot?	Notes
Marquee	1	2	2	(United States) James Blake	N	Designated
Marquee	2	2	8	Pass	–	
Roster	1	2	2	(United States) Shelby Rogers	N	
Roster	2	2	8	(South Africa) Raven Klaasen	Y	
Roster	3	2	14	(United Kingdom) Daniel Evans	N	
Roster	4	2	20	(Croatia) Darija Jurak	Y	
Roster	5	2	26	Pass	–	

== Match log ==
=== Regular season ===
Legend
Aviators Win	Aviators Loss
Home team in CAPS

Match	Date	Venue and location	Result and details	Record
1	July 31	Omni La Costa Resort and Spa; Carlsbad, California	SAN DIEGO AVIATORS 20, Orange County Breakers 19 * MS: Dennis Novikov (Breakers) 5 James Blake (Aviators) 3 * WS: Nicole Gibbs (Breakers) 5, Shelby Rogers (Aviators) 2 * MD: James Blake/Raven Klaasen (Aviators) 5, Dennis Novikov/Scott Lipsky (Breakers) 2 * WD: Darija Jurak/Shelby Rogers (Aviators) 5, Nicole Gibbs/Alla Kudryavtseva (Breakers) 3 * XD: Raven Klaasen/Darija Jurak (Aviators) 5, Scott Lipsky/Alla Kudryavtseva (Breakers) 4	1–0
2	August 1	Breakers Stadium at the Newport Beach Tennis Club; Newport Beach, California	ORANGE COUNTY BREAKERS 22, San Diego Aviators 20 * XD: Scott Lipsky/Alla Kudryavtseva (Breakers) 5, Raven Klaasen/Darija Jurak (Aviators) 2 * WS: Nicole Gibbs (Breakers) 5, Shelby Rogers (Aviators) 4 * MD: Ryan Harrison/Raven Klaasen (Aviators) 5, Steve Johnson/Scott Lipsky (Breakers) 3 * WD: Darija Jurak/Shelby Rogers (Aviators) 5, Nicole Gibbs/Alla Kudryavtseva (Breakers) 4 * MS: Steve Johnson (Breakers) 5 Ryan Harrison (Aviators) 4	1–1
3	August 2	Omni La Costa Resort and Spa; Carlsbad, California	SAN DIEGO AVIATORS 23, Orange County Breakers 15 (extended play) * MS: Ryan Harrison (Aviators) 5, Dennis Novikov (Breakers) 2 * WS: Shelby Rogers (Aviators) 5, Nicole Gibbs (Breakers) 1 * MD: Ryan Harrison/Raven Klaasen (Aviators) 5, Scott Lipsky/Dennis Novikov (Breakers) 2 * WD: Nicole Gibbs/Alla Kudryavtseva (Breakers) 5, Darija Jurak/Shelby Rogers (Aviators) 3 * XD: Scott Lipsky/Alla Kudryavtseva (Breakers) 5, Raven Klaasen/Darija Jurak (Aviators) 4 * EP - XD: Raven Klaasen/Darija Jurak (Aviators) 1, Scott Lipsky/Alla Kudryavtseva (Breakers) 0	2–1
4	August 3	Breakers Stadium at the Newport Beach Tennis Club; Newport Beach, California	ORANGE COUNTY BREAKERS 21, San Diego Aviators 19 * MD: Scott Lipsky/Dennis Novikov (Breakers) 5, Ryan Harrison/Raven Klaasen (Aviators) 2 * WS: Shelby Rogers (Aviators) 5, Nicole Gibbs (Breakers) 4 * MS: Ryan Harrison (Aviators) 5, Dennis Novikov (Breakers) 3 * XD: Raven Klaasen/Darija Jurak (Aviators) 5, Scott Lipsky/Alla Kudryavtseva (Breakers) 4 * WD: Nicole Gibbs/Alla Kudryavtseva (Breakers) 5, Darija Jurak/Shelby Rogers (Aviators) 2	2–2
5	August 5	Omni La Costa Resort and Spa; Carlsbad, California	SAN DIEGO AVIATORS 24, New York Empire 18 * MS: Ryan Harrison (Aviators) 5, Daniel Nguyen (Empire) 4 * WS: Shelby Rogers (Aviators) 5, Christina McHale (Empire) 4 * MD: Raven Klaasen/Ryan Harrison (Aviators) 5, Daniel Nguyen/Neal Skupski (Empire) 2 * WD: María Irigoyen/Christina McHale (Empire) 5, Darija Jurak/Shelby Rogers (Aviators) 4 * XD: Darija Jurak/Raven Klaasen (Aviators) 5, María Irigoyen/Neal Skupski (Empire) 3	3–2
6	August 6	Omni La Costa Resort and Spa; Carlsbad, California	SAN DIEGO AVIATORS 21, Washington Kastles 15 * MS: Ernests Gulbis (Aviators) 5, Bjorn Fratangelo (Kastles) 2 * WS: Madison Brengle (Kastles) 5, Shelby Rogers (Aviators) 1 * MD: Ernests Gulbis/Raven Klaasen (Aviators) 5, Ken Skupski/Bjorn Fratangelo (Kastles) 2 * WD: Darija Jurak/Shelby Rogers (Aviators) 5, Madison Brengle/Andreja Klepač (Kastles) 3 * XD: Darija Jurak/Raven Klaasen (Aviators) 5, Andreja Klepač/Ken Skupski (Kastles) 3	4–2
7	August 7	Omni La Costa Resort and Spa; Carlsbad, California	SAN DIEGO AVIATORS 22, Springfield Lasers 19 (extended play) * MS: Ryan Harrison (Aviators) 5, Benjamin Becker (Lasers) 2 * WS: Shelby Rogers (Aviators) 5, Pauline Parmentier (Lasers) 3 * MD: Ryan Harrison/Raven Klaasen (Aviators) 5, Benjamin Becker/Jean Andersen (Lasers) 3 * WD: Michaëlla Krajicek/Pauline Parmentier (Lasers) 5, Darija Jurak/Shelby Rogers (Aviators) 4 * XD: Benjamin Becker/Michaëlla Krajicek (Lasers) 5, Raven Klaasen/Darija Jurak (Aviators) 2 * EP - XD: Raven Klaasen/Darija Jurak (Aviators) 1, Benjamin Becker/Michaëlla Krajicek (Lasers) 1	5–2
8	August 8	Omni La Costa Resort and Spa; Carlsbad, California	SAN DIEGO AVIATORS 23, Philadelphia Freedoms 15 (extended play) * MS: Ryan Harrison (Aviators) 5, Lukáš Lacko (Freedoms) 2 * WS: Shelby Rogers (Aviators) 5, Naomi Broady (Freedoms) 0 *** Naomi Broady substituted for Samantha Crawford at 0–3 * MD: Ryan Harrison/Raven Klaasen (Aviators) 5, Lukáš Lacko/Fabrice Martin (Freedoms) 3 * WD: Naomi Broady/Samantha Crawford (Freedoms) 5, Darija Jurak/Shelby Rogers (Aviators) 4 * XD: Fabrice Martin/Naomi Broady (Freedoms) 5, Raven Klaasen/Darija Jurak (Aviators) 3 * EP - XD: Raven Klaasen/Darija Jurak (Aviators) 1, Fabrice Martin/Naomi Broady (Freedoms) 0	6–2
9	August 10	Kastles Stadium at the Charles E. Smith Center; Washington, District of Columbia	San Diego Aviators 23, WASHINGTON KASTLES 20 * XD: Treat Huey/Andreja Klepač (Kastles) 5, Raven Klaasen/Darija Jurak (Aviators) 4 * WS: Shelby Rogers (Aviators) 5, Madison Brengle (Kastles) 3 * MD: Sam Groth/Treat Huey (Kastles) 5, Ryan Harrison/Raven Klaasen (Aviators) 4 * WD: Shelby Rogers/Darija Jurak (Aviators) 5, Madison Brengle/Andreja Klepač (Kastles) 4 * MS: Ryan Harrison (Aviators) 5, Stéphane Robert (Kastles) 3	7–2
10	August 11	Mediacom Stadium at Cooper Tennis Complex; Springfield, Missouri	SPRINGFIELD LASERS 23, San Diego Aviators 21 (extended play) * MD: Ryan Harrison/Raven Klaasen (Aviators) 5, Eric Butorac/John Isner (Lasers) 3 * WD: Michaëlla Krajicek/Pauline Parmentier (Lasers) 5, Darija Jurak/Shelby Rogers (Aviators) 4 * XD: Eric Butorac/Michaëlla Krajicek (Lasers) 5, Raven Klaasen/Darija Jurak (Aviators) 2 * WS: Michaëlla Krajicek (Lasers) 5, Shelby Rogers (Aviators) 4 * MS: Ryan Harrison (Aviators) 5, John Isner (Lasers) 4 * EP - MS: John Isner (Lasers) 1, Ryan Harrison (Aviators) 1	7–3
11	August 12	Forest Hills Stadium; New York City, New York	San Diego Aviators 24, NEW YORK EMPIRE 16 * MS: Ryan Harrison (Aviators) 5, Marcus Willis (Empire) 3 * WS: Christina McHale (Empire) 5, Shelby Rogers (Aviators) 4 * XD: Raven Klaasen/Darija Jurak (Aviators) 5, Neal Skupski/María Irigoyen (Empire) 3 * WD: Shelby Rogers/Darija Jurak (Aviators) 5, María Irigoyen/Christina McHale (Empire) 2 * MD: Ryan Harrison/Raven Klaasen (Aviators) 5, Neal Skupski/Marcus Willis (Empire) 3	8–3
12	August 13	The Pavilion; Radnor Township, Pennsylvania	PHILADELPHIA FREEDOMS 25, San Diego Aviators 9 * XD: Naomi Broady/Fabrice Martin (Freedoms) 5, Darija Jurak/Raven Klaasen (Aviators) 2 * WD: Naomi Broady/Coco Vandeweghe (Freedoms) 5, Darija Jurak/Shelby Rogers (Aviators) 1 * MD: Fabrice Martin/Donald Young (Freedoms) 5, Raven Klaasen/Nick Monroe (Aviators) 3 * WS: Coco Vandeweghe (Freedoms) 5, Shelby Rogers (Aviators) 2 * MS: Donald Young (Freedoms) 5, Nick Monroe (Aviators) 1	8–4

=== WTT Finals ===
Legend
Aviators Win	Aviators Loss
Home team in CAPS

Date	Venue and location	Result and details
August 26	Forest Hills Stadium; New York City, New York	SAN DIEGO AVIATORS 25, Orange County Breakers 14 (extended play) * XD: Darija Jurak/Raven Klaasen (Aviators) 5, Alla Kudryavtseva/Scott Lipsky (Breakers) 2 * WS: Shelby Rogers (Aviators) 5, Nicole Gibbs (Breakers) 2 * MD: Ryan Harrison/Raven Klaasen (Aviators) 5, Scott Lipsky/Dennis Novikov (Breakers) 2 * WD: Darija Jurak/Shelby Rogers (Aviators) 5, Nicole Gibbs/Alla Kudryavtseva (Breakers) 2 * MS: Dennis Novikov (Breakers) 5, Ryan Harrison (Aviators) 4 * EP - MS: Ryan Harrison (Aviators) 1, Dennis Novikov (Breakers) 1

== Team personnel ==
=== Players and coaches ===
- (United Kingdom) John Lloyd, Coach
- (United States) James Blake
- (Latvia) Ernests Gulbis (Note: Player appeared in fewer than three matches during the season as a substitute player and was not eligible to be protected in the following year's draft.)
- (United States) Ryan Harrison
- (Croatia) Darija Jurak
- (South Africa) Raven Klaasen
- (United States) Nick Monroe
- (United States) Shelby Rogers

=== Front office ===
- Fred Luddy, Principal Owner
- Jack McGrory, Minority Owner
- Jim Ault, General Manager

== Statistics ==
Players are listed in order of their game-winning percentage provided they played in at least 40% of the Aviators' games in that event, which is the WTT minimum for qualification for league leaders in individual statistical categories.

Men's singles - regular season

Player	GP	GW	GL	PCT	A	DF	BPW	BPP	BP%	3APW	3APP	3AP%
Ryan Harrison	74	45	29	.608	39	6	8	13	.615	6	9	.667
Ernests Gulbis	7	5	2	.714	4	1	1	2	.500	1	1	1.000
James Blake	8	3	5	.375	1	1	0	1	.000	1	2	.500
Nick Monroe	6	1	5	.167	1	0	0	0	–	1	2	.500
Total	95	54	41	.568	45	8	9	16	.563	9	14	.643

Women's singles - regular season

Player	GP	GW	GL	PCT	A	DF	BPW	BPP	BP%	3APW	3APP	3AP%
Shelby Rogers	92	47	45	.511	16	6	12	30	.400	12	23	.522
Total	92	47	45	.511	16	6	12	30	.400	12	23	.522

Men's doubles - regular season

Player	GP	GW	GL	PCT	A	DF	BPW	BPP	BP%	3APW	3APP	3AP%
Raven Klaasen	92	54	38	.587	14	5	11	39	.282	11	23	.478
Ryan Harrison	70	41	29	.586	8	5	9	35	.257	9	19	.474
James Blake	7	5	2	.714	0	0	1	1	1.000	0	0	–
Ernests Gulbis	7	5	2	.714	1	1	1	3	.333	0	1	.000
Nick Monroe	8	3	5	.375	0	0	0	0	–	2	3	.667
Total	92	54	38	.587	23	11	11	39	.282	11	23	.478

Women's doubles - regular season

Player	GP	GW	GL	PCT	A	DF	BPW	BPP	BP%	3APW	3APP	3AP%
Darija Jurak	98	47	51	.480	7	2	14	35	.400	16	27	.593
Shelby Rogers	98	47	51	.480	3	5	14	35	.400	16	27	.593
Total	98	47	51	.480	10	7	14	35	.400	16	27	.593

Mixed doubles - regular season

Player	GP	GW	GL	PCT	A	DF	BPW	BPP	BP%	3APW	3APP	3AP%
Darija Jurak	100	47	53	.470	1	8	11	26	.423	7	17	.412
Raven Klaasen	100	47	53	.470	9	10	11	26	.423	7	17	.412
Total	100	47	53	.470	10	18	11	26	.423	7	17	.412

Team totals - regular season

Event	GP	GW	GL	PCT	A	DF	BPW	BPP	BP%	3APW	3APP	3AP%
Men's singles	95	54	41	.568	45	8	9	16	.563	9	14	.643
Women's singles	92	47	45	.511	16	6	12	30	.400	12	23	.522
Men's doubles	92	54	38	.587	23	11	11	39	.282	11	23	.478
Women's doubles	98	47	51	.480	10	7	14	35	.400	16	27	.593
Mixed doubles	100	47	53	.470	10	18	11	26	.423	7	17	.412
Total	477	249	228	.522	104	50	57	146	.390	55	104	.529

Men's singles - WTT Finals

Player	GP	GW	GL	PCT	A	DF	BPW	BPP	BP%	3APW	3APP	3AP%
Ryan Harrison	11	5	6	.455	7	1	0	0	–	1	1	1.000
Total	11	5	6	.455	7	1	0	0	–	1	1	1.000

Women's singles - WTT Finals

Player	GP	GW	GL	PCT	A	DF	BPW	BPP	BP%	3APW	3APP	3AP%
Shelby Rogers	7	5	2	.714	0	2	2	2	1.000	2	2	1.000
Total	7	5	2	.714	0	2	2	2	1.000	2	2	1.000

Men's doubles - WTT Finals

Player	GP	GW	GL	PCT	A	DF	BPW	BPP	BP%	3APW	3APP	3AP%
Ryan Harrison	7	5	2	.714	1	1	1	1	1.000	1	1	1.000
Raven Klaasen	7	5	2	.714	0	0	1	1	1.000	1	1	1.000
Total	7	5	2	.714	1	1	1	1	1.000	1	1	1.000

Women's doubles - WTT Finals

Player	GP	GW	GL	PCT	A	DF	BPW	BPP	BP%	3APW	3APP	3AP%
Darija Jurak	7	5	2	.714	1	0	2	2	1.000	1	1	1.000
Shelby Rogers	7	5	2	.714	1	0	2	2	1.000	1	1	1.000
Total	7	5	2	.714	2	0	2	2	1.000	1	1	1.000

Mixed doubles - WTT Finals

Player	GP	GW	GL	PCT	A	DF	BPW	BPP	BP%	3APW	3APP	3AP%
Darija Jurak	7	5	2	.714	0	0	1	1	1.000	0	0	–
Raven Klaasen	7	5	2	.714	0	2	1	1	1.000	0	0	–
Total	7	5	2	.714	0	2	1	1	1.000	0	0	–

Team totals - WTT Finals

Event	GP	GW	GL	PCT	A	DF	BPW	BPP	BP%	3APW	3APP	3AP%
Men's singles	11	5	6	.455	7	1	0	0	–	1	1	1.000
Women's singles	7	5	2	.714	0	2	2	2	1.000	2	2	1.000
Men's doubles	7	5	2	.714	1	1	1	1	1.000	1	1	1.000
Women's doubles	7	5	2	.714	2	0	2	2	1.000	1	1	1.000
Mixed doubles	7	5	2	.714	0	2	1	1	1.000	0	0	–
Total	39	25	14	.641	10	6	6	6	1.000	5	5	1.000

Men's singles - all matches

Player	GP	GW	GL	PCT	A	DF	BPW	BPP	BP%	3APW	3APP	3AP%
Ryan Harrison	85	50	35	.588	46	7	8	13	.615	7	10	.700
Ernests Gulbis	7	5	2	.714	4	1	1	2	.500	1	1	1.000
James Blake	8	3	5	.375	1	1	0	1	.000	1	2	.500
Nick Monroe	6	1	5	.167	1	0	0	0	–	1	2	.500
Total	106	59	47	.557	52	9	9	16	.563	10	15	.667

Women's singles - all matches

Player	GP	GW	GL	PCT	A	DF	BPW	BPP	BP%	3APW	3APP	3AP%
Shelby Rogers	99	52	47	.525	16	8	14	32	.438	14	25	.560
Total	99	52	47	.525	16	8	14	32	.438	14	25	.560

Men's doubles - all matches

Player	GP	GW	GL	PCT	A	DF	BPW	BPP	BP%	3APW	3APP	3AP%
Ryan Harrison	77	46	31	.597	9	6	10	36	.278	10	20	.500
Raven Klaasen	99	59	40	.596	14	5	12	40	.300	12	24	.500
James Blake	7	5	2	.714	0	0	1	1	1.000	0	0	–
Ernests Gulbis	7	5	2	.714	1	1	1	3	.333	0	1	.000
Nick Monroe	8	3	5	.375	0	0	0	0	–	2	3	.667
Total	99	59	40	.596	24	12	12	40	.300	12	24	.500

Women's doubles - all matches

Player	GP	GW	GL	PCT	A	DF	BPW	BPP	BP%	3APW	3APP	3AP%
Darija Jurak	105	52	53	.495	8	2	16	37	.432	17	28	.607
Shelby Rogers	105	52	53	.495	4	5	16	37	.432	17	28	.607
Total	105	52	53	.495	12	7	16	37	.432	17	28	.607

Mixed doubles - all matches

Player	GP	GW	GL	PCT	A	DF	BPW	BPP	BP%	3APW	3APP	3AP%
Darija Jurak	107	52	55	.486	1	8	12	27	.444	7	17	.412
Raven Klaasen	107	52	55	.486	9	12	12	27	.444	7	17	.412
Total	107	52	55	.486	10	20	12	27	.444	7	17	.412

Team totals - all matches

Event	GP	GW	GL	PCT	A	DF	BPW	BPP	BP%	3APW	3APP	3AP%
Men's singles	106	59	47	.557	52	9	9	16	.563	10	15	.667
Women's singles	99	52	47	.525	16	8	14	32	.438	14	25	.560
Men's doubles	99	59	40	.596	24	12	12	40	.300	12	24	.500
Women's doubles	105	52	53	.495	12	7	16	37	.432	17	28	.607
Mixed doubles	107	52	55	.486	10	20	12	27	.444	7	17	.412
Total	516	274	242	.531	114	56	63	152	.414	60	109	.550

== Transactions ==
- March 25, 2016: The Aviators protected Raven Klaasen and Darija Jurak and selected James Blake, Shelby Rogers and Daniel Evans at the WTT Draft. The Aviators left Taylor Fritz, Květa Peschke and Chanelle Scheepers unprotected.
- July 8, 2016: Daniel Evans withdrew from WTT for undisclosed reasons.
- July 15, 2016: The Aviators signed Ryan Harrison as a roster player.
- August 6, 2016: The Aviators signed Ernests Gulbis as a substitute player.
- August 13, 2016: The Aviators signed Nick Monroe as a substitute player.

== Individual honors and achievements ==
The following table shows individual honors bestowed upon players and coaches of the San Diego Aviators in 2016.

Player/Coach	Award
Ryan Harrison	Male Most Valuable Player
Raven Klaasen	WTT Finals Most Valuable Player
John Lloyd	Coach of the Year

Ryan Harrison led the league in winning percentage in men's singles and was second behind teammate Raven Klaasen in men's doubles.

Shelby Rogers was third in WTT in winning percentage in women's singles.

Klaasen and Darija Jurak were tied for sixth in WTT in winning percentage in mixed doubles.

== See also ==
- Sports in San Diego
