= Oceanside Shock =

- City: Oceanside, California
- League: Federal Prospects Hockey League
- Conference: Western
- Division: Frontier
- Founded: 2026
- Home arena: Frontwave Arena (capacity: 5,500)
- Colors: Carolina blue, black, white
- Owner: Phil Salvagio
- Head coach: Craig Carlyle

The Oceanside Shock are a professional ice hockey team based in Oceanside, California, within the San Diego metropolitan area. The team is a member of the Federal Prospects Hockey League (FPHL) and plays its home games at the Frontwave Arena.

== History ==
=== Formation ===
On May 5, 2026, the FPHL announced that a expansion franchise had been secured for Oceanside, California. The ownership group was led by Phil Salvagio, an owner and the head coach of the San Diego Sockers indoor soccer team, as well as a co-owner of their prospective venue, the Frontwave Arena. On June 11, Craig Carlyle was named as their head coach.

On August 4, the team revealed their name, along with their colors and mascot.

== Team colors, logo, mascot ==
The team's colors are Carolina blue, black and white. The mascot is a "determined jellyfish" holding a hockey stick.
