= The Show (SDSU student section) =

The Show

The Show is the student section of the San Diego State Aztecs teams that represent San Diego State University (SDSU). Known for its vocal and creative support of the Aztecs, particularly the men's basketball team, it has garnered national recognition. The basketball student section consists of three designated sections in Viejas Arena, which are located behind the basket near the visiting team's bench. The Show is credited with being the first student section to ever use Big Heads as free throw distractions. Its mantra is "No one likes us. We don't care."

== Name ==
During the early days of The Show, a fan posted on an SDSU sports message board, "You guys think you're the whole show." It was this statement that led to the raucous student section taking the name "The Show."

== Early history ==
The history of The Show can be traced back to the 2001–2002 men's basketball season. With 1997 opening of Cox Arena, now called Viejas Arena, the men's and women's basketball teams moved across the street from Peterson Gym. Two years later, SDSU moved to the Mountain West Conference. Also occurring that year was the hiring of former University of Michigan head men's basketball coach, Steve Fisher. The teams struggled during Fisher's first two years at SDSU, winning 5 and 14 games respectively. It was during the 2001–02 season that the program turned around. Led by Al Faux, Tony Bland, and Randy Holcomb, the team finished with a 10–4 conference record, and going 21–12 overall. This was the best record for the school in nearly 20 years. It was during that season that The Show was formed by a small group of 6–8 fans came together to support the team. Some were SDSU students, while some were still in high school.

During the 2002 Mountain West Conference men's basketball tournament, SDSU pulled off a major upset as the number five seed. In three straight days, SDSU beat four seed BYU, one seed Wyoming, and were set to face hometown favorite UNLV in the finals. With the Aztecs holding onto a slim lead as the clock counted down, SDSU fans began to line up on the baseline to rush the court. Right as the final buzzer was about to sound, football player Akbar Gbaja-Biamila looked over to a Rebel fan and stated, "Remember this day, when the Aztecs came into your arena and rushed onto your court!" The buzzer sounded and SDSU had just won their first Mountain West Conference tournament title and were set to go to the NCAA Division I men's basketball tournament. It was on this trip to Chicago that the casual group of friends formed the foundation of what would become The Show.

== Big heads ==
Before the 2002-2003 basketball season, Conor Mongan, a member of The Show was watching the movie BASEketball, in which opposing players do whatever it takes to distract each other while they shoot. He took this strategy and combined it with the use of athletes' and celebrities' cardboard heads on Pardon the Interruption. It was during a road game at Long Beach State that the first Big Head in college basketball history was used. As a Long Beach player stepped to the free throw line, Conor revealed a large cutout of an unflattering version of Michael Jackson from a court appearance at the time. The Long Beach player took a double take, bent over laughing, and missed the free throw. Since then The Show has added more and more heads every year. As of the 2011-12 San Diego State Aztecs men's basketball season, The Show has an estimated 125 big heads used during games. The heads are distributed throughout the lower part of the section at halftime, and are used during the second half of home games when the opponent is at the free throw line. Since appearing in ESPN The Magazine's December 19, 2005 issue, which documented the origins of the heads, student sections all over the country have joined the trend including Kansas and Marquette.

== Costumes ==
Costumes have been an important part of The Show since the founding. While many student sections feel the need to dress up in uniformity, The Show prides itself on its creativity and individuality. In fact, one of the Show Commandments reads "Thou shalt wear two types of attire to games: red and black, or whatever the hell you want. 'Show' clothing is designed to be as funny, ludicrous and intimidating as possible. Costumes, outfits, and any accessories you can dream up are definitely encouraged." Conor Mongon, one of the original Show members was quoted saying, "we liken it almost to a Mardi Gras parade. Everyone’s out there having fun, going crazy." ESPN columnist Dana O'Neil describes The Show as, "the nonsensical, whimsical, illogical student section at San Diego State, where no costume is deemed too strange." Many of The Show's costumes from recent years have been posted in a blog on The Show's Wordpress page.

== Songs and chants ==
The Show is rich in tradition with coming up with creative chants and songs for games. The list of songs/chants includes:

- Aztecs Bombaye – Stemming from the 1974 Rumble in the Jungle fight between Muhammad Ali and George Foreman, Ali was greeted with chants of "Ali bombaye! Ali bombaye!" which means "Ali kill him!" or "Ali defeat him!" It was during the 2005 SDSU-BYU football game that "Aztecs Bombaye (pronounced Boom-Bye-Yay)" began. An African exchange student started shouting "Aztecs bombaye!" to pump up the SDSU players. Every time the student started the chant, something good happened for the Aztecs. The Show would later adopt it for basketball games. Not to use up all of its luck, The Show would only use the chant in dire situations, when the team needed a stop.
- "Tarzan Boy" by Baltimora – A Show staple for years.
- "I believe that we will win!" – During the 2010–11 season, The Show put their own spin on the chant, started at Navy and adopted by Utah State. The Show has famous SDSU alumni as guests and help lead the chant before the game. The next year, SDSU used the chant as a basis for their marketing campaign including a nationally aired 30 second commercial where SDSU students, alumni including Ralph Rubio and Jerry Sanders, and San Diego residents chanted it.
- "Uprising" by Muse – Started during the 2010 Mountain West Conference men's basketball tournament. A Show member heard the song playing at the Thomas & Mack Center and since then, The Show has sung the chorus before games accompanied by the Aztec Pep Band, and a cappella at random points during games. Currently the song is performed immediately after the I Believe chant.
- "Bro Hymn" by Pennywise – Started during the 2011–12 season, the Aztec Pep band plays the song as the team's entrance music as The Show sings along to the beat.
- "Seven Nation Army" by The White Stripes – Also started during the 2011–12 season, The Show started doing an a cappella version of the beat.

== Twitter ==
The Show has a Twitter page under the handle @TheShowSDSU that is updated regularly with general athletics information, trash talk about other schools, and other topics. Currently, the account has over 15,000 followers. Under the original handle "The__Show", the original purpose of the account was to tweet out the scores of baseball games.

== Banner ==
During the 2011–12 season, The Show introduced a giant banner into their repertoire. The banner was paid for by Associated Students of SDSU and made its debut at home game against UNLV on January 14, 2012. A few minutes before tip-off, the Show reveals the banner, covering the front section. The banner remains up until the team comes onto the court.

== Controversy ==
Standing behind the mantra "No one likes us. We don't care," The Show has a history of approaching, if not crossing the line on occasion. The first controversial act by The Show was during a 2010 game against former Mountain West Conference rival BYU, a school that is owned and operated by the Church of Jesus Christ of Latter-day Saints (LDS Church). For this home game, several dozen Show members dressed up in Mormon missionary apparel, wearing white button-down shirts, black ties, and bike helmets. This move was criticized by Sports Illustrated writer Seth Davis. He is described the stunt as a "Totally classless move by several dozen San Diego State students who dressed up as Mormon missionaries to mock BYU when the Cougars came to town on Saturday night. Riding the opposition is fine, but there are a few things that are off-limits, and religion is of them." Near the end of the game, with SDSU losing, fans started chanting "You're still Mormon." During this game, one sign came under fire for being over the line. It said, "Which wife gave you mono?" This was referencing both Jimmer Fredette's recent bout with mononucleosis and polygamy in early LDS history. The BYU player saw the sign and laughed it off. The next season, both teams ranked in the top 10 in the nation during their meeting at Viejas. Weeks before the game, an SDSU student tried to get in Jimmer's head by creating a Facebook event that invited students to “Poke Jimmer Fredette’s girlfriend because Jimmer can’t poke her for himself.” In the description, students were told the mission was to "disrupt, upset, distract and irritate (the) opponent.” More than 7,000 people were invited to the event, which had a picture of Jimmer's girlfriend (now wife) Whitney Wonnacott and her Facebook profile. Other students started selling "I poked Jimmer's girlfriend" shirts. These shirts were banned for the game, yet a few students managed to sneak in with them. For the game, hundreds of Show members dressed up in Mormon gear, despite a letter emailed to students from coach Fisher, where he said, "We know that the energy and enthusiasm brought by The Show is what makes Viejas Arena one of the toughest home courts in the country. It is important to remember that when you are in the student section, you represent something greater than yourself. You represent San Diego State... We cannot cross the line into topics that are out of bounds and distasteful, particularly making fun of one’s religion." During this game, there were many signs and posters referencing Mormonism, including "Hi mom(s)," "Jimmer Fredette is a false idol," and "Aztec basketball is my religion." Fredette would score 25 points and hand out 9 assists as BYU won 80–67. During the 2012 Mountain West Conference tournament, members of The Show sent out tweets from The Show's Twitter account that made fun of a camera shot of UNLV's legendary basketball coach, Jerry Tarkanian. Some of the tweets sent out included “Will Tark be alive by Saturday to see us storm the court for a 3rd straight year?” “Tarkanian makes Tom Ables (SDSU’s dedicated senior citizen fan) looks like Channing Tatum.” and “Tarkanian looks like dog (bleep).” San Diego Union-Tribune writer Don Norcross responded by writing an article saying the tweets were sent in poor taste.

== See also ==
- San Diego State Aztecs
- Viejas Arena
