= Frontwave Credit Union =

- Type: Credit union
- Industry: Financial services
- Founded: 1952
- Headquarters: Oceanside, California, United States
- Number of locations: 13 branch locations
- Area served: San Diego County, Riverside County, and San Bernardino County
- Key people: Bill Birnie, President/CEO Board of Directors; Brian Sutton, Chairman; Joseph Mitllieri, Vice Chairman; Gary Greving, Secretary; Kelley Mayer, Treasurer; Richard B. Rothwell, Director; Michael Brigagliano, Director; Sally L. Arnett, Director; Gerald Polyascko, Director; Amanda Cook, Director
- Products: Savings; checking; consumer loans; mortgages; credit cards; online banking; car loan; home loan, solar loans
- Total assets: $1.2 Billion USD (2022)
- Website: www.frontwavecu.com

Frontwave Credit Union is a member-owned credit union headquartered in Oceanside, California. Established in 1952, it serves members in San Diego, Riverside, and San Bernardino counties, with a membership base that includes military personnel in Southern California. As of 2023, the credit union reported assets of more than $1.4 billion and approximately 122,000 members. In 2024, a KPBS investigation reported that Frontwave had collected millions of dollars in overdraft fees from members, including Marine recruits.

== Overview ==
Frontwave Credit Union is based in Southern California with branch locations in Oceanside, San Marcos, San Diego, Escondido, Wildomar, Temecula, Barstow, and Yucca Valley. They also have branches aboard MCB Camp Pendleton, MCRD San Diego, and MCAGCC 29-Palms.

Frontwave Credit Union, as of 2023, has more than $1.4 billion in assets and 122,000 members.

Frontwave Credit Union is owned and governed by its members. Like all credit unions, they have a field of membership that designates who may join. To qualify for membership one must live or work in San Diego County, Riverside County, or San Bernardino County, or be an immediate family member of a current Frontwave Credit Union member.

Frontwave Credit Union, as a financial cooperative, provides access to nearly 30,000 surcharge-free ATMs nationwide, 9,000+ of which accept deposits. In addition, there are nearly 5,000 credit union branches and over 2,000 self-service locations through the shared branching network.

In 1995 the credit union assumed administrative management of the Recruit Direct Deposit Program. The program was so successful that the credit union was awarded the "Golden Hammer Award" in 1997 by Vice President Al Gore for reducing government waste.

== Controversies ==
In 2024, a KPBS investigation found that Frontwave had benefited from an exclusive arrangement with the United States Marine Corps for decades. Each year, approximately 20,000 Marine recruits go through boot camp at the San Diego Marine Corps Recruit Depot (MCRD). The Marine Corps funnels many of these recruits into the credit union to process their paychecks. KPBS discovered that, over the previous three years, the credit union had collected approximately $8 million annually in overdraft fees from its members, which was about triple the average among all California state-chartered credit unions. Financial records showed that the credit union relied on the fees as a key source of revenue. These fees were often applied to accounts with low balances, sometimes draining the accounts entirely. After the initial report, members of Congress launched an investigation into Frontwave, in April 2024, this included U.S. Sens. Elizabeth Warren, Bernie Sanders, Cory Booker, JD Vance, and Rep. Sara Jacobs. The members of Congress called the overdraft practices “unconscionable” and urged for a change in fee policies. They also expressed worry about the potential harm that excessive overdraft fees could cause service members.
