= Glacier Gardens =

Indoor arena in San Diego, California, US

Coordinates: 32.705°N 117.158°W

Glacier Gardens was an indoor arena in San Diego, California. It opened in 1939. The arena held 5,000 people. It was located at the intersection of 8th and Harbor, just south of present-day Petco Park.

== History ==
In 1939, the San Diego Figure Skating Club was founded with the arena as its home. The club was incorporated in 1940. The arena was the venue for ice shows throughout the 1940s. It hosted the Pacific Coast Hockey League's San Diego Skyhawks from 1944 to 1950. By 1956, the venue was known as "The Arena". Elvis Presley, with his backup band, guitarist Scotty Moore, bassist Bill Black, and drummer D. J. Fontana, appeared at the arena on April 4 and 5, 1956, and June 5 and 6, 1956. In the early 1960s, the arena was sub-leased for retail and auctions, then for manufacture of a miniature jeep, the Crofton Bug.
