= Student section =

Group of audience at sporting events

A student section or student cheering section is a group of student fans that supports its school's athletic teams at sporting events; they are known for being one of the most visible and vocal sections of a sports crowd as well as for their occasionally raucous behavior. They are most often associated with NCAA basketball and football games, but can be found in several sports in both college and high school. A student section is an important part of a school's fanbase and a significant contributor to home advantage.

== Function ==
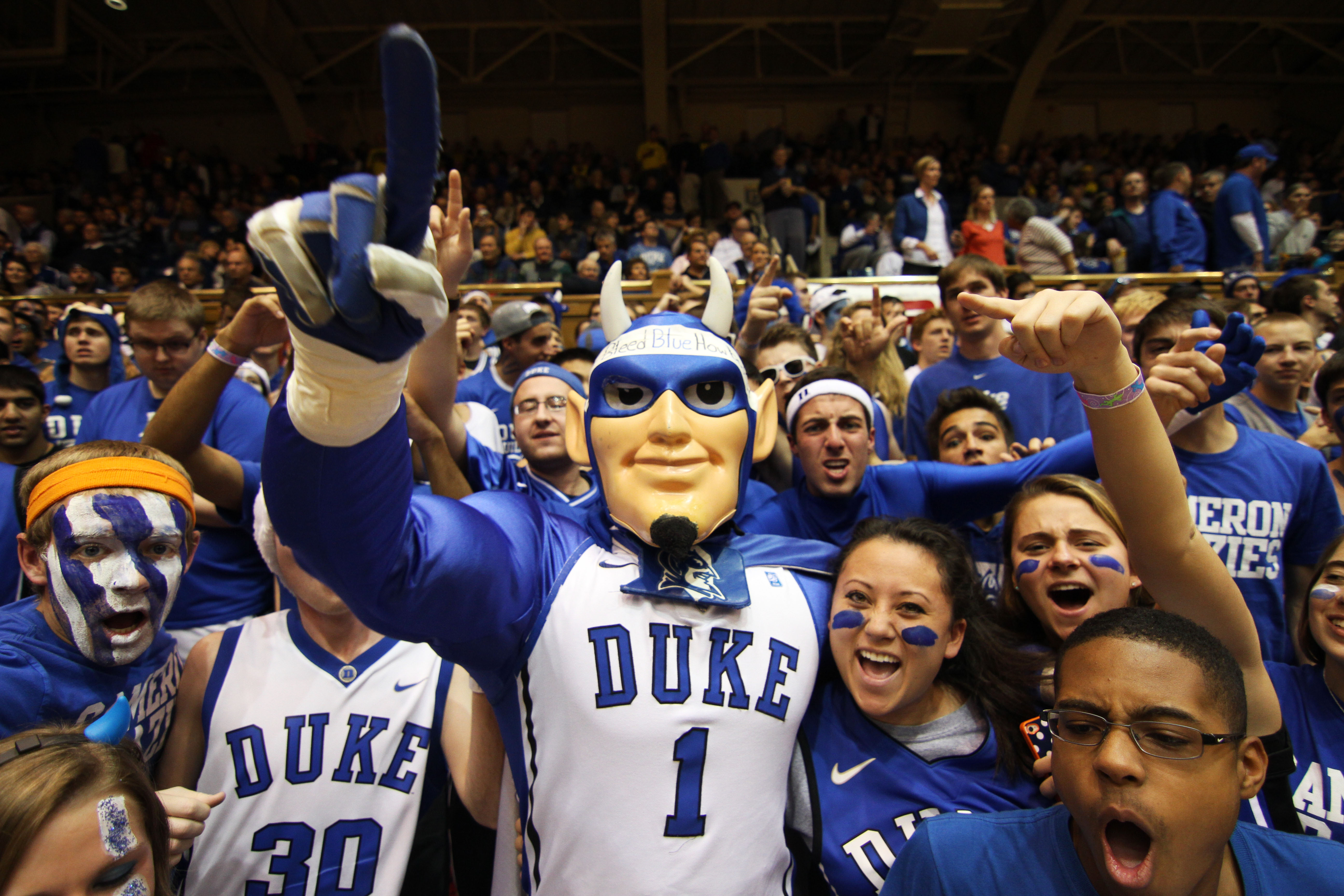
The Cameron Crazies at Duke University's Cameron Indoor Stadium

A student section can vary in size from dozens to thousands of people, and comprises current students, the school's marching band or pep band, and in some cases, recent alumni. The students often arrive and fill their designated section in the stadium before the rest of the fans, sometimes hours before the beginning of the game, and will usually remain standing throughout. Before, during, and after the game, the section performs a number of different group actions, including chants, songs, gestures, dances, and the use of props. Some of these actions are passed down over generations, while others are completely spontaneous. The purpose is twofold: to energize the home team and crowd and to frustrate the visiting team.

As media exposure of college athletics has grown, some schools' students have come under fire for inappropriate behavior, including starting profane chants; harassment of visiting teams and fans; and throwing objects.

=== Basketball ===
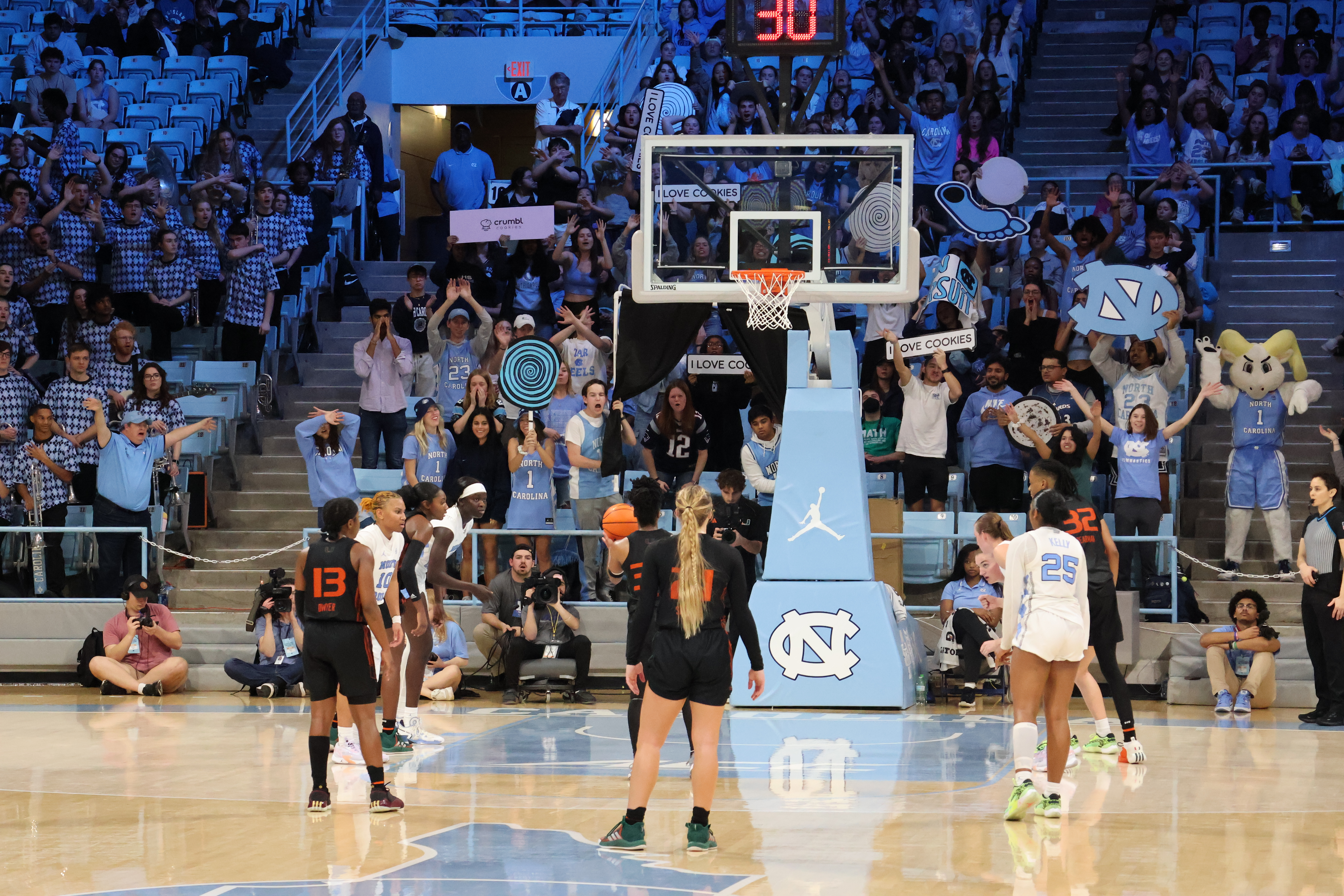
The UNC student section at UNC's Dean Smith Center

Several student sections have become an integral part of the game experience, and as such have earned nicknames for themselves. Duke University's Cameron Crazies synchronize their actions and make player-specific taunts outlined on distributed "cheer sheets."

The Orange Krush of The University of Illinois Urbana–Champaign has donated more than a total of $2.5 million to various charities via the Orange Krush Foundation. The Show at San Diego State University uses Big Heads as free throw distractions. Other named student sections include the Izzone, the Oakland Zoo, The Bench and the Hoo Crew.

At most schools, the student section will be on the end closer to the visiting team bench. As both NFHS and NCAA rules require teams to play at the basket towards their own bench during the second half, this placement allows free throw distractions to occur during crucial moments of the game.

=== Football ===
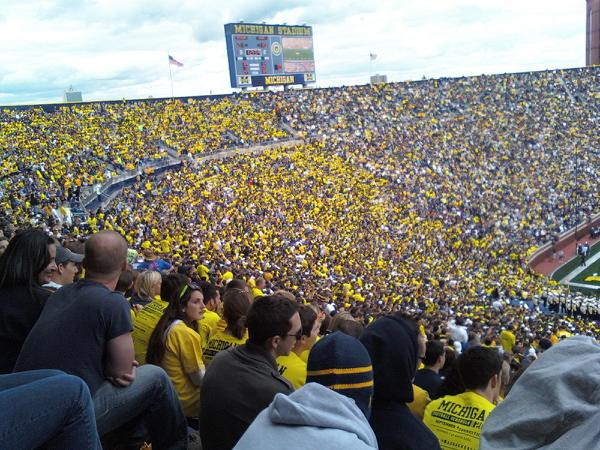
Student section at The Big House

Football student sections are similar to those in basketball, but can be considerably larger, sometimes consisting of several thousand people. They are often situated in one or both endzones to allow the crowd noise to distract the opposing team's offense while in the red zone or backed up against their own endzone. Many football programs directly involve the student section as a part of the gameday experience, where they are integrated into the team's pregame and postgame.

Penn State has one of the nation's most famous and intimidating student sections. In 2008, it was recognized as having the best student section in the country for the second consecutive year. In 2019, it was named student section of the year by a committee of ESPN broadcasters and writers.

=== Other sports ===
Student sections can also be found at other school sporting events - including soccer, ice hockey, and baseball games - for both men's and women's teams.

== See also ==
- Collegiate sport ritual in the United States
- Pep band
- Pep squad
