= Melissa Gallegos =

American football player (born 1978/79)

No. 3
- Position: Quarterback

Personal information
- Born: 1978 or 1979 (age 47–48)
- Listed height: 5 ft 6 in (1.68 m)

Career history
- San Diego SunFire (2001–2002); So Cal Scorpions (2003–2007, 2010); San Diego Surge (2011–2012, 2014–2015, 2017–2018)

Awards and highlights
- WFA championship (2012); WFA All-American (2011, 2014, 2015); IWFL All-Star (2010); WPFL championship (2007); WPFL Offensive Player of the Year (2007); WPFL First-team All-Pro (2007); Women’s Football Hall of Fame inductee (2018)

Melissa Gallegos
Medal record

Women's American football

Representing United States

IFAF Women's World Championship
Gold medal – first place	2010 Stockholm	Team

Melissa Gallegos (born 1978/79) is an American former football player. A quarterback, she won two national championships in two different leagues with the So Cal Scorpions and the San Diego Surge. She also won a gold medal with the United States women's national team at the 2010 IFAF Women's World Championship.

Gallegos played basketball and softball while growing up in El Centro, California. She began her professional football career in 2001 after trying out for the San Diego SunFire of the upstart Women's American Football League. After two seasons, Gallegos joined the So Cal Scorpions of the Women's Professional Football League (WPFL) in 2003. She helped the team capture the 2007 WPFL national championship and was named the league's Offensive Player of the Year. However, the league folded after the season and Gallegos took a two-year hiatus. She returned to the field in 2010.

Gallegos helped found the San Diego Surge of the Women's Football Alliance (WFA). She led the team to a perfect season in 2012, capped off by winning the WFA national championship at Heinz Field in the first pro women's football game played in an NFL stadium. Gallegos helped the Surge reach two other WFA national title games in 2011 and 2014, and won multiple WFA All-American honors. She retired after the 2018 season, finishing with over 12,000 career passing yards.

In 2017, Gallegos was named one of the 12 greatest quarterbacks in women's football history by Neal Rozendaal, author of The Women’s Football Encyclopedia. She was enshrined in the inaugural class of the Women’s Football Hall of Fame the following year.

== Early life ==
Gallegos attended Central Union High School in her hometown of El Centro, California, where she played four years of softball as a catcher. She played basketball from a young age as well, which she also continued playing into high school. Gallegos was a big football fan as well. She grew up supporting the San Francisco 49ers and Joe Montana, often watching football games with her father, who was a San Diego Chargers fan. Gallegos also played powderpuff in high school. After graduating in 1997, she attended Imperial Valley College for one year before she moved to San Diego.

== Career ==
=== San Diego SunFire ===
In 2001, Gallegos was convinced by a friend to try out for the San Diego SunFire of the upstart Women's American Football League (WAFL). Standing at 5 ft 6 in (1.68 m), she made the team on the final day of tryouts. The SunFire finished the 2001 season with a 5–5 record, after which they joined the newly-reorganized American Football Women's League (AFWL). Gallegos led the team to an 8–0 regular season record in 2002. In the semifinals, she completed 10-of-16 pass attempts for 177 yards and five touchdowns in a 55–0 blowout win over the Arizona Titans. However, the SunFire were upset in the AFWL championship game by the Long Beach Aftershock, whom San Diego had previously beaten in both regular season matchups.

=== So Cal Scorpions ===
In 2003, Gallegos joined a new team formed by former SunFire personnel called the So Cal Scorpions, which joined the Women's Professional Football League (WPFL). On August 2, 2003, she was the starting quarterback for the team's inaugural game, an 8–7 loss to the Los Angeles Amazons, in front of a "boisterous" home crowd in Temecula. Gallegos threw two touchdown passes the next week in a surprisingly close 16–14 defeat to the Arizona Caliente, who reached the league title game the previous year. The Scorpions lost their first five games, which also included a 41–0 loss to the defending champion Houston Energy, before rallying to finish their inaugural season with a 4–6 record. (Note: Their record is alternatively reported as 3–7 or 2–7.)

The Scorpions moved to San Diego in 2004 and attracted a larger fan base, although they finished the season with a 1–9 record, with their only victory being an overtime win over the Los Angeles Amazons. On August 13, 2005, Gallegos caught a touchdown pass in a 28–13 win over the three-time WPFL champion Houston Energy. (Note: Gallegos was also listed as a tight end in 2005.) The Scorpions managed to reverse their previous year's record, finishing the regular season with a 9–1 record and the first divisional title in team history. They won one playoff game and advanced to the American Conference championship game, where they lost 48–19 to the Dallas Diamonds. The following year, the Scorpions went 6–2 and returned to the American Conference championship game, and were once again defeated by the Dallas Diamonds, this time by a score of 34–3.

On September 8, 2007, the Scorpions avenged their back-to-back playoff losses with a decisive 34–14 victory over the Dallas Diamonds in Dallas, and beat them again at home later that same month. The team finished the regular season with a 6–2 record with Gallegos at the helm; she threw for over 1,700 yards and 24 touchdowns, earning Offensive Player of the Year and first-team All-Pro honors. Gallegos and the Scorpions once again reached the American Conference championship game, facing the undefeated Empire State Roar in Rochester, New York. The night before the game, the Scorpions players practised in several layers of clothing due to the cold December weather and were "mocked and taunted" by their opponents, who were themselves practising in shorts. "We were given two hours to practice, and we only used 30 minutes because it was so cold," Gallegos said. The Scorpions, who had lost the regular season matchup at home in September, dominated the Roar in a 42–6 rout to capture the conference title. Gallegos later called it one of her favorite career moments. She then led the Scorpions to a 14–7 comeback win over the Houston Energy in the WPFL national championship game in front of "one of the largest crowds ever to watch a professional women’s football game". However, the WPFL ceased operations shortly thereafter, leaving the Scorpions without a league.

After a two-year hiatus, the Scorpions returned in 2010 as members of the Independent Women's Football League (IWFL), returning several players from the 2007 championship team. Gallegos estimated that she lost 30 lb (14 kg) in preparation for her return to football, saying: "We live, we breathe, we eat and we sleep football right now". On April 10, 2010, she threw two touchdown passes in a 22–0 victory over the Southern California Breakers, their first win since 2007. The Scorpions earned a playoff berth after finishing the regular season with a 6–2 record, with Gallegos throwing for 1,941 yards. (Note: It is unclear if playoff totals were included.) The Scorpions suffered a 60–26 loss to the Sacramento Sirens in the divisional round of the playoffs. Gallegos was selected to play in the IWFL All-Star Game in Round Rock, Texas, where she helped the West defeat the East by a score of 43–6.

=== San Diego Surge ===
Gallegos and her partner, Christina Carrillo, co-founded a new team, the San Diego Surge, which joined the Women's Football Alliance (WFA) for the 2011 WFA season. That year, Gallegos completed 78-of-144 pass attempts for 1,233 yards and 20 touchdowns, and added two rushing touchdowns, as the Surge finished the regular season with an 8–0 record. She was named a WFA First-team All-American. In the American Conference championship game, Gallegos threw four touchdown passes and ran for another in a 48–20 win over the Dallas Diamonds. "We're regular people and have regular jobs. We do this for fun," she said. "We just want all these young girls to get that same feeling that we got." The Surge reached the WFA national championship game, where they lost to the Boston Militia by a score of 34–19.

"I feel very old for this sport – I sometimes feel like Brett Favre. But we've got a lot of key players and a lot of experience, so we shouldn't have any problem to play for another championship." –Gallegos ahead of the 2012 season

In 2012, Gallegos led the Surge to a perfect season in just its second year of existence. She completed 81-of-138 pass attempts for 1,084 yards and 18 touchdowns as the team once again finished the regular season with an 8–0 record, shutting out all but one opponent. In the American Conference championship game, Gallegos threw three touchdown passes in a 56–29 win over the Dallas Diamonds. The Surge faced off against the Chicago Force at Heinz Field in the WFA national championship game – the first professional women's football game played in an NFL stadium. Gallegos threw for 261 yards and three touchdowns in a 40–36 victory over the Force, which was broadcast on ESPN3. After capturing the WFA title, Gallegos and Carrillo took a one-year hiatus from football to raise their newborn son, temporarily handing over team ownership to Surge running back/linebacker Knengi Martin for the 2013 season. "I felt it was the right time to step away and let the mind and body heal," said Gallegos, who nursed an injured shoulder during her time off. She attended a few Surge games during this period, which motivated her to return to play, later saying: "I missed football so much, and I know that I can still compete at this level."

Gallegos returned to the Surge for the 2014 season, inspiring several former players from the 2012 championship team to come back as well. In her first game back, she threw five touchdown passes in a 59–6 season-opening win over the Las Vegas Showgirlz. The following month, Gallegos threw four touchdowns in a 64–0 romp of the Central Cal War Angels, avenging San Diego's playoff loss from the previous year. The Surge finished the regular season with another perfect 8–0 record as she completed 64-of-107 pass attempts for 1,086 yards and a league-best 21 touchdowns. Gallegos, who also threw just one interception, earned WFA First-team All-American honors for her performance. The Surge captured the American Conference crown with a 59–14 win over the Kansas City Titans, advancing to the WFA national championship game for the third time in four years. In a rematch of the 2011 title game, Gallegos threw two touchdown passes in a 69–34 loss to the Boston Militia in Chicago.

Ahead of the 2015 season, Gallegos outlined her reasons for continuing to play football: "I just have a love for this sport. I am very competitive and feel like I can still play at this level. I will know when its time to hang up the cleats, and even though the time is drawing near, I want to take full advantage of every moment I have." Gallegos threw three touchdown passes in their season opener, a 73–31 thumping of the Pacific Warriors. She led the Surge to a 7–1 regular season record while completing 68-of-144 pass attempts for 1,205 yards and 15 touchdowns, again earning WFA All-American honors. Gallegos helped the team redeem their only loss of the season, which had been called one of the biggest upsets in league history, by beating the Central Cal War Angels 27–7 in their playoff opener. The Surge beat the previously undefeated Seattle Majestics in the next round to advance to the American Conference championship game for the second year in a row, where they lost to the Dallas Elite, 56–28.

The Surge took a one-year hiatus in 2016, which Carrillo attributed to the team's age, before returning to play in 2017. In their first game back, Gallegos threw four touchdowns in a 41–40 win over the Los Angeles Warriors. She finished the season completing 85-of-178 pass attempts for 1,149 yards and 10 touchdowns as the Surge finished with a 5–3 record, with two losses coming against the Central Cal War Angels. In the first round of the playoffs, Gallegos threw a touchdown and ran for another in a 51–30 victory over the Los Angeles Warriors. In the next round, she led the Surge to a 35–34 overtime victory over the previously unbeaten Central Cal War Angels, avenging their losses that season. After throwing a touchdown pass in regulation, Gallegos tied the game in overtime on a one-yard quarterback keeper, after which Melissa Strother kicked the extra point for the win. Gallegos called their playoff run "a Cinderella story" after beating two higher-seeded teams. The Surge eventually lost to the two-time defending champion Dallas Impact, 63–7, in the American Conference championship game.

After six seasons in the WFA, the Surge moved to the IWFL for the 2018 season. In the team's league debut, Gallegos led San Diego to a 72–8 blowout of the Los Angeles Bobcats. The Surge finished the regular season with a 4–1 record and took part in the independently-organized Best of the West Women’s Football Championship in Las Vegas, where they finished in third place by beating the Seattle Majestics in the consolation game by a score of 16–6. Gallegos officially retired following the 2018 season, having thrown for over 12,000 yards in her career. Following her retirement, the Surge joined the newly-created Women's National Football Conference (WNFC) for its inaugural 2019 season. However, the team ceased operations on September 10, 2019, after compiling an all-time team record of 68–14–1.

=== U.S. national team ===
Gallegos was named to the 45-woman roster for the first-ever United States women's national team ahead of the 2010 IFAF Women's World Championship. "We are having the time of our lives," she said after throwing a touchdown pass in the team's opening 63–0 win over Austria. Gallegos scored a six-yard rushing touchdown in their next game, a 72–0 victory over Finland. She helped the United States capture the gold medal with a 66–0 win over Canada in the final.

== Legacy ==
In 2017, Gallegos was named one of the 12 greatest quarterbacks in women's football history by Neal Rozendaal, author of The Women’s Football Encyclopedia. In 2021, she was named the first-team quarterback on the San Diego Women’s Football All-Decade Team for the 2010s by San Diego Football Network.

Gallegos was enshrined in the inaugural class of the Women’s Football Hall of Fame in 2018.

== Personal life ==
Gallegos co-owned the San Diego Surge with her partner, Christina Carrillo, who played on the offensive line. Carrillo's mother, Rose Gonzalez of Billings, Montana, died on July 11, 2011, during the team's WFA playoff run, after which the Surge wore red rose stickers on their helmets to honor who they called their "biggest supporter" in a press release.

When Gallegos and Carrillo chose to have a baby, it was decided that Carrillo would get pregnant so that Gallegos could continue playing for the Surge in 2012. Carrillo gave birth to their son, Brayden, that June, and even returned to the playing field in time to help the team win the championship game. "That was our deal at the beginning of this season," said Gallegos. "She said, 'If I carry this baby for you, you have to win a championship.' And with this team, we did it." The pair then missed the 2013 season to raise their newborn son, with Gallegos saying she "felt it was the right time to step away and spend time with him". Ahead of her 2015 season with the Surge, she said: "He's now really understanding the fact that I play football. I cherish that huge smile on his face when he sees me all suited up with a helmet on. I look forward to him watching me this season."

Gallegos lived in Eastlake, Chula Vista, as of 2010. The following year, she was described as running a print shop in Chula Vista.
