= 2011 Women's Football Alliance season =

The 2011 Women's Football Alliance season was the third season of the Women's Football Alliance (WFA), a league of 61 teams. The regular season began on Saturday, April 2, and ended on Saturday, June 18. After the playoffs, the season ended with the WFA Championship Game on Saturday, July 30 at Pennington Field in Bedford, Texas, home of the Dallas Diamonds and the defending champions from 2010, the Lone Star Mustangs. The championship was between the National Conference champ Boston Militia and the American Conference winner San Diego Surge, who are in their first year of play, and the Militia won the WFA title with a 34–19 over the Surge. It is the team's first Women's Football Alliance championship.

== Regular season standings ==
=== National Conference ===
2011 WFA North Division
	W	L	T	PCT	PF	PA	DIV	GB	STK
y - Boston Militia	7	1	0	0.875	364	72	5-0	---	W7
z - New York Sharks	5	3	0	0.625	212	177	3-2	2.0	L1
Northeastern Nitro	4	4	0	0.500	46	243	2-3	3.0	L1
New England Nightmare	0	8	0	0.000	28	264	0-5	7.0	L8

y - clinched division title
z - clinched playoff berth

2011 Northeast Division
	W	L	T	PCT	PF	PA	DIV	GB	STK
y-D.C. Divas	7	1	0	0.875	332	69	4-0	---	W1
Keystone Assault	3	5	0	0.375	92	166	1-3	4.0	W2
Philadelphia Liberty Belles	2	6	0	0.250	137	219	1-3	5.0	L4

2011 Mid Atlantic Division
	W	L	T	PCT	PF	PA	DIV	GB	STK
y-Pittsburgh Passion	8	0	0	1.000	270	35	8-0	---	W8
Cleveland Fusion	5	3	0	0.625	267	90	5-3	3.0	L1
Columbus Comets	5	3	0	0.625	191	60	5-3	3.0	W2
Pittsburgh Force	2	6	0	0.000	8	364	2-6	6.0	L1
Erie Illusion	0	8	0	0.250	68	255	0-8	8.0	L8

2011 Central Division
	W	L	T	PCT	PF	PA	DIV	GB	STK
y-Chicago Force	8	0	0	1.000	413	84	4-0	---	W8
St. Louis Slam	5	3	0	0.625	261	140	2-2	3.0	W2
West Michigan Mayhem	3	5	0	0.375	173	204	0-4	5.0	L3

2011 North Central 1 Division
	W	L	T	PCT	PF	PA	DIV	GB	STK
y-Indy Crash	6	2	0	0.750	321	147	4-0	---	L1
Cincinnati Sizzle	4	4	0	0.500	222	169	2-2	2.0	W2
Kentucky Karma	1	7	0	0.125	34	318	0-4	5.0	L2

2011 North Central 2 Division
	W	L	T	PCT	PF	PA	DIV	GB	STK
y-Detroit Dark Angels	6	2	0	0.750	242	82	3-1	---	W4
Toledo Reign	4	4	0	0.500	209	161	3-1	2.0	L3
Dayton Diamonds	0	8	0	0.000	24	462	0-4	5.5	L8

2011 Atlantic Division
	W	L	T	PCT	PF	PA	DIV	GB	STK
y-Atlanta Heartbreakers	4	4	0	0.500	122	270	4-0	---	L1
Carolina Raging Wolves	1	7	0	0.125	84	249	1-3	3.0	L2
Savannah Sabers	1	7	0	0.125	84	249	1-3	3.0	L4

2011 South Atlantic Division
	W	L	T	PCT	PF	PA	DIV	GB	STK
y-Jacksonville Dixie Blues	8	0	0	1.000	328	70	4-0	---	W8
Orlando Anarchy	5	3	0	0.625	168	139	2-2	3.0	W3
Gulf Coast Riptide	3	5	0	0.375	174	216	0-4	5.0	W1

2011 Coastal Division
	W	L	T	PCT	PF	PA	DIV	GB	STK
y-Miami Fury	7	1	0	0.875	302	89	4-0	---	W1
Palm Beach Punishers	5	3	0	0.625	164	96	2-2	2.0	L1
Tampa Bay Pirates	2	6	0	0.250	95	160	0-4	5.0	L6

y - clinched division title

=== American Conference ===
2011 Midwest Division
	W	L	T	PCT	PF	PA	DIV	GB	STK
y-Kansas City Tribe	7	1	0	0.875	520	68	5-0	---	W3
Iowa Xplosion	5	3	0	0.625	119	230	2-3	2.0	L1
Nebraska Stampede	3	5	0	0.375	136	178	2-3	4.0	W2
Kansas City Spartans	3	5	0	0.375	112	269	1-4	4.0	W1

2011 Upper Midwest Division
	W	L	T	PCT	PF	PA	DIV	GB	STK
y-Minnesota Machine	5	3	0	0.625	150	117	4-0	---	W2
Wisconsin Wolves	4	4	0	0.500	144	207	2-2	1.0	L1
Wisconsin Dragons	0	8	0	0.000	27	271	0-4	5.0	L8

2011 South Central Division
	W	L	T	PCT	PF	PA	DIV	GB	STK
y-Dallas Diamonds	8	0	0	1.000	279	53	4-0	---	W8
Lone Star Mustangs	5	3	0	0.625	161	60	2-2	3.0	L1
Austin Outlaws	3	5	0	0.375	156	160	0-4	5.0	L1

2011 Gulf Division
	W	L	T	PCT	PF	PA	DIV	GB	STK
y-Houston Power	6	2	0	0.750	165	65	4-0	---	W4
New Orleans Blaze	4	4	0	0.500	70	166	2-2	2.0	L3
Acadiana Zydeco	1	7	0	0.125	74	170	0-4	5.0	L2

2011 Southeast Division
	W	L	T	PCT	PF	PA	DIV	GB	STK
y-Memphis	6	2	0	0.750	258	95	4-0	---	W2
Little Rock Wildcats	3	5	0	0.375	124	202	2-2	3.0	W1
Tulsa Eagles	0	8	0	0.000	14	330	0-4	6.0	L8

2011 Northwest Division
	W	L	T	PCT	PF	PA	DIV	GB	STK
y-Portland Fighting Fillies	4	4	0	0.500	46	152	4-1	---	W1
Utah Blitz	3	5	0	0.375	98	150	3-2	1.0	W2
Spokane Scorn	1	7	0	0.125	60	142	1-5	3.0	L3

2011 North Pacific Division
	W	L	T	PCT	PF	PA	DIV	GB	STK
y-Bay Area Bandits	7	3	0	0.750	223	72	4-1	---	L1
Central Cal War Angels	6	2	0	0.750	232	53	3-2	---	W4
Los Angeles Amazons	1	7	0	0.125	6	263	0-4	5.5	W1

'''y''' = Clinched Division Title

2011 South Pacific Division
	W	L	T	PCT	PF	PA	DIV	GB	STK
y-San Diego Surge	8	0	0	1.000	483	54	4-0	---	W8
Pacific Warriors	4	4	0	0.500	173	193	2-2	4.0	L3
Las Vegas Showgirlz	3	5	0	0.375	48	251	0-4	5.0	L1

2011 Southwest Division
	W	L	T	PCT	PF	PA	DIV	GB	STK
y-Silver State Legacy	6	2	0	0.750	199	79	5-1	---	W3
Arizona Assassins	6	2	0	0.750	207	103	5-1	---	W1
So Cal Scorpions	2	6	0	0.250	37	111	2-4	4.0	L4
San Diego Sting	1	7	0	0.125	38	239	0-6	5.0	W1

y - clinched division title

== Playoffs ==
=== National Conference ===
Quarterfinals; June 25
NO	Boston Militia	37
NE	D.C. Divas	24
MA	Pittsburgh Passion	31
CE	Chicago Force	41
AT	Atlanta Heartbreakers	0
NC	Indy Crash	47
CO	Miami Fury	18
SA	Jacksonville Dixie Blues	20

Semifinals; July 9
NO	Boston Militia	50
CE	Chicago Force	23
NC	Indy Crash	42
SA	Jacksonville Dixie Blues	0

Conference Championship; July 16
NO	Boston Militia	46
NC	Indy Crash	18

=== American Conference ===
Quarterfinals; June 25
UM	Minnesota Machine	0
MW	Kansas City Tribe	51
G/S	Houston Power	6
SC	Dallas Diamonds	21
NW	Portland Fighting Fillies	0
NP	Bay Area Bandits	39
SW	Silver State Legacy	7
SP	San Diego Surge	42

Semifinals; July 9
MW	Kansas City Tribe	20
SC	Dallas Diamonds	23
NP	Bay Area Bandits	0
SP	San Diego Surge	36

Conference Championship; July 16
SC	Dallas Diamonds	20
SP	San Diego Surge	48

=== Championship ===
WFA National Championship
NC	Boston Militia	34
AC	San Diego Surge	19
