= Utah Jynx =

Women's American football team

- Founded: 2010
- League: Independent (2011); WFA (2012-2013)
- Team history: Utah Jynx (2011-present)
- Based in: West Valley City, Utah
- Stadium: Herriman High School
- Colors: Navy blue, gold, green, and white
- Owners: Greg Cover
- Coaches: Greg Cover

The Utah Jynx is a team of the Women's Football Alliance that began play in 2011 and joined the WFA in 2012. Following their successful 2011 season as an independent team, they were placed at #7 in the WFA preseason rankings by EZ Football Rankings. Based in West Valley City, Utah, the Jynx play their home games on the campus of Taylorsville High School.

In their inaugural season, the Jynx played as an independent team. For the 2012 season, they join the Utah Blitz as the second WFA team in the Beehive State.

In 2012, in their first season as a member of the WFA, the Jynx finished as the undefeated division champions of the American Conference Division 14, (7 - 0 overall, 4 - 0 in the division). They clinched the division after defeating the Portland Fighting Fillies 33 - 13 in Portland. The Fillies were the division champions the last two season previous, in 2010 and 2011. The Jynx suffered an early loss in the playoffs by losing to the Central Cal War Angels at home, 26 - 36. The Jynx also had six players receive WFA All American honors: 3 first team, and 3 second team. The 3 first team All Americans flew out to Pittsburgh, Pennsylvania to participate in the All Star Game held on August 4, 2012, the same day as the WFA National Championship game held at Heinz Field. The two teams playing in the National Championship were the San Diego Surge and the Chicago Force. The Surge won the game 40 - 36, thanks to a last second interception.

Going into the 2013 season, the Jynx changed divisions, and are now with the Las Vegas Showgirlz and Utah Blitz. On June 8, 2013, the Utah Jynx wrapped up their second season in the WFA, having acquired a 6 - 2 record for the regular season and a second consecutive division championship. They averaged 54 points per game in the regular season and amassed over 3,500 yards of offense.

On June 15, 2013, the Jynx traveled to Seattle, Washington to play in a rematch vs. the undefeated Seattle Majestics, who had defeated the Jynx in week one of the WFA season 47 - 18. Going into the playoff game, the Jynx were predicted to lose by 11 points, but after taking the lead 14 - 13 going into halftime, the Jynx won 36 - 26, earning their first playoff victory in the team's 3-year history. The following week, the Jynx traveled to Fresno, California to face the Central Cal War Angels, for another rematch of last year's first round. The Jynx fell behind 21 - 0 after the first quarter, and ended up losing 65 - 6 to the War Angels.

== Move to the IWFL ==
On March 4, 2014, KUTV News program "Get Gephardt" raised questions about what the owner and head coach of the Utah Jynx, Coach Greg Cover, had done with the approximately $1,150 per player fees he received from multiple players to play football The Jynx were released from the Women's Football Alliance, per the WFA league's founder, "We just don't want this type of person or this type of team in our league anymore." The Jynx have since joined the IWFL. The report revealed that over half the team and most of the team's coaches quit halfway through the 2013 season in protest of Cover's actions.

== New field location ==
The Jynx have selected Herriman High School as their new home field with the full consent of the Jordan School District. Jynx will play its first IWFL game at Herriman on April 19, 2014, against the California Quake. Jynx have struggled to find a field this year, after being banned from Taylorsville High because of the owner's inability to pay for the field last year. Taylorsville is in the Granite School District.

== 2014 season results ==
The Jynx have struggled in the IWFL this season, losing their first game against the California Quake 20–15. The Jynx lost their second IWFL game 40–12 to the Phoenix Phantomz, where the game was called in the third quarter due to injuries. The Jynx cancelled/forfeited their third game against the Tucson Monsoon, making their record 0–3 in IWFL. Finally, the Jynx forfeited their game against the Rocky Mountain Thunderkatz with speculation that the Jynx team is folding for the season (or indefinitely), making their record 1–5 overall in the 2014 season.

== Media attention ==
The Jynx organization was the subject of an investigation launched by Salt Lake City's Channel 2 News as part of its Get Gephardt program, regarding the Jynx organization's questionable fundraising practices. This was the second investigation launched of the Utah Jynx by Channel 2's Get Gephardt program. In the first case, players questioned the disappearance of their player fees by the team's ownership. In the latter case, a fan paid $30 up front for cookie dough to the Utah Jynx, but after months of waiting she got word that she would not be getting the product.

== Banned from the IWFL ==
After being banned from the WFA in 2014, the Jynx were subsequently removed from the IWFL prior to the 2015 season. The Jynx were replaced with another team from the Rocky Mountain region, the Thunderkatz. The Jynx owner has been "in hiding" since the removal of his team from the IWFL. With no further prospects for league play, the Jynx organization has been permanently dissolved.

== Season-by-season ==
Season records
Season	W	L	T	Finish	Playoff results
Utah Jynx (Independent)
2011	5	3	0		
Utah Jynx (WFA)
2012	8	1	0	1st WFA American Conference Division 14	0 - 1, 6/23: vs. Central Cal War Angels, Loss 26 - 36 (WFA American Conference Playoffs, First Round)
Utah Jynx (WFA)
2013*	10	3	0	1st WFA American Conference Division 11	1 - 1, 6/15: at Seattle Majestics, Win 36 - 26 (WFA American Conference Playoffs, First Round) 6/22: at Central Cal War Angels, Loss 6 - 65 WFA American Conference Playoffs, Quarterfinals)
Totals	23	7	0		

* = Current standing

== 2011 ==
=== Season schedule ===
Date	Opponent	Home/Away	Result
March 26	Las Vegas Showgirlz (WFA)	Away	L 8 - 12
April 16	Sacramento Sirens (IWFL)	Away	L 20 - 45
April 23	Ventura Black Widows (WSFL)	Away	W 51 - 6
May 28	Las Vegas Showgirlz (WFA)	Home	W 43 - 22
June 11	Houston Energy (IWFL)	Away	L 17 - 22
July 9	Ventura Black Widows (WSFL)	Home	W 60 - 0
July 16	Nevada Storm (WSFL)	Home	W 33 - 12
July 23	Arizona Assassins (WFA)	Home	W 34 - 20

== 2012 ==
=== Season schedule ===
Date	Opponent	Home/Away	Result
March 31	Silver State Legacy (Preseason)	Home	W 28 - 27
April 21	Utah Blitz (Division 14 Game)	Away	W 49 - 23
April 28	Portland Fighting Fillies (Division 14 Game)	Home	W 20 - 13
May 12	Las Vegas Showgirlz	Home	W 38 - 28
May 19	Los Angeles Amazons	Away	W 62 - 22
June 2	Portland Fighting Fillies (Division 14 Game)	Away	W 33 - 13
June 9	Utah Blitz (Division 14 Game)	Home	W 50 - 0
June 16	Colorado Sting (IWFL)	Home	W FORFEIT
June 23	Central Cal War Angels (WFA American Conference Playoffs, First Round)	Home	L 26 - 36

== 2013 ==
=== Season schedule ===
Date	Opponent	Home/Away	Result
March 16	Everett Reign (Preseason)	Away	W 54 - 6
March 23	Phoenix Phantomz (Preseason)	Home	W 38 - 10
March 30	Colorado Sting (Preseason)	Home	W 55 - 18
April 6	Seattle Majestics	Away	L 18 - 47
April 13	Tacoma Trauma	Home	W 73 - 6
April 20	Las Vegas Showgirlz (Division 11 game)	Away	W 38 - 28
May 4	Arizona Assassins	Away	W 80 - 6
May 11	Utah Blitz (Division 11 game)	Away	W 66 - 22
May 18	Nevada Storm	Home	W 47 - 22
May 25	Las Vegas Showgirlz (Division 11 game)	Home	L 50 - 56
June 8	Utah Blitz (Division 11 game)	Home	W 60 - 6
June 15	Seattle Majestics (WFA American Conference Playoffs, First Round)	Away	W 36 - 26
June 22	Central Cal War Angels (WFA American Conference Playoffs, Quarterfinals)	Away	L 6 - 65
