= Ed Philpott =

American football player (born 1945)

No. 52
- Position: Linebacker

Personal information
- Born: September 14, 1945; Wichita, Kansas, U.S.
- Died: July 20, 1993 (aged 47)
- Listed height: 6 ft 3 in (1.91 m)
- Listed weight: 240 lb (109 kg)

Career information
- High school: Brookside (Sheffield, Ohio)
- College: Miami (OH)
- NFL draft: 1967: 4th round, 101st overall pick

Career history
- Boston / New England Patriots (1967-1971); Southern California Sun (1974)

Awards and highlights
- Boston Patriots All-1960s Team; Second-team All-American (1966)

Career NFL/AFL statistics
- Interceptions: 9
- Fumble recoveries: 11
- Touchdowns: 1
- Stats at Pro Football Reference

Edward Leigh Philpott (September 14, 1945 – July 20, 1993) is an American former professional football player who was a linebacker in the National Football League (NFL). He played college football for the Miami RedHawks and was selected by the Boston Patriots in the fourth round of the 1967 NFL/AFL draft.

Philpott is a member of the Patriots 10th Anniversary Team.

His daughter, Tarrah, played for the So Cal Scorpions, the California Quake, the San Diego Surge, and the Pacific Warriors, and was named the Women's Football Alliance Defensive Player of the Year in 2013.
