= 2012 Women's Football Alliance season =

The 2012 Women's Football Alliance season was the fourth season of the Women's Football Alliance, a league of 64 teams. The regular season began on Saturday, April 2, and ended on Saturday, June 18. After the playoffs, which fielded 12 teams in each conference instead of the 8 that were fielded in the 2011 season, the season ended with the WFA Championship Game on Saturday, August 4 at Heinz Field in Pittsburgh, Pennsylvania, home of the Pittsburgh Steelers (it was the first women's football championship game to be played at a National Football League stadium). The game was shown live on ESPN3, the first time a live women's football game has been shown on a major network. In the championship, the San Diego Surge defeated the Chicago Force 40–36, winning its first championship, having lost the previous year to the Boston Militia.

== Regular-season standings ==
=== National Conference ===
2012 Division 1
	W	L	T	PCT	PF	PA	DIV	GB	STK
Keystone Assault	5	1	0	0.800	204	45	2-0	---	W3
New England Nightmare	2	3	0	0.400	99	91	1-1	1.0	L1
Maine Lynx	1	3	0	0.250	38	117	0-2	3.0	W1

2012 WFA Division 2
	W	L	T	PCT	PF	PA	DIV	GB	STK
y - Boston Militia	8	0	0	1.000	458	139	4-0	---	W8
z - New York Sharks	4	4	0	0.500	104	227	2-2	4	W2
Philadelphia Liberty Belles	2	6	0	0.250	30	234	0-3	6	L3

y - clinched division title
z - clinched division title

2012 Division 3
	W	L	T	PCT	PF	PA	DIV	GB	STK
Pittsburgh Passion	7	1	0	0.875	407	90	3-1	---	W3
D.C. Divas	5	3	0	0.625	289	157	4-1	1	L1
Columbus Comets	2	6	0	0.250	78	139	0-2	4	W1

2012 Division 4
	W	L	T	PCT	PF	PA	DIV	GB	STK
Detroit Dark Angels	8	0	0	1.000	248	46	4-0	---	W8
Cleveland Fusion	2	5	0	0.333	60	168	2-1	3	L1
Pittsburgh Force	0	6	0	0.000	26	210	0-4	5	L6

2012 Division 5
	W	L	T	PCT	PF	PA	DIV	GB	STK
Toledo Reign-y	3	5	0	0.375	136	237	3-1	---	L1
Derby City Dynamite	4	4	0	0.500	128	100	3-1	---	W1
Cincinnati Sizzle	0	8	0	0.000	66	333	0-4	3	L8

=== American Conference ===
2012 Division 10
	W	L	T	PCT	PF	PA	DIV	GB	STK
Minnesota Machine	4	1	0	0.800	128	71	4-0	---	W4
Wisconsin Wolves	2	2	0	0.500	75	85	2-1	0.5	W1
Nebraska Stampede	2	3	0	0.400	52	82	1-3	1.5	L2
Wisconsin Dragons	0	4	0	0.000	21	160	0-3	5	L4

2012 Division 11
	W	L	T	PCT	PF	PA	DIV	GB	STK
Kansas City Tribe	3	1	0	0.750	208	41	2-0	---	W3
St. Louis Slam	2	2	0	0.500	146	90	1-1	0.5	L1
Kansas City Spartans	1	3	0	0.250	33	150	0-2	2.0	L3

2012 Division 16
	W	L	T	PCT	PF	PA	DIV	GB	STK
y-Bay Area Bandits	8	2	0	0.800	324	7151	7-0	---	
Central Cal War Angels	7	3	0	0.700	352	125	4-3	---	
West Coast Lightning	2	6	0	0.250	69	234	2-4	---	
Valley Vipers	1	7	0	0.125	12	334	0-6	---	

'''y''' = Clinched Division Title
