= Women's American football in the United States =

Women's American football in the United States is the American football sport played by women, both regionally in the United States and worldwide in the IFAF Women's World Championship.

== History ==
American football has been played by women, both regionally in the United States and worldwide in the IFAF Women's World Championship. Women have played in leagues accessible to both genders and in leagues designed exclusively for women.

- The Women's Professional Football League (1965–1973) was formed in 1963. It stopped operations in 1973.
- In 1970, Patricia Palinkas became the holder of the Orlando Panthers and became the first woman to play in the Atlantic Coast Football League.
- The Women's Professional Football League operated again between 1999 and 2007.
- A second league, the Independent Women's Football League was founded in 2000. In 2009 were founded the Women's Football Alliance and The X League.
- In 2010, Katie Hnida became the kicker for the Fort Wayne FireHawks in the Continental Indoor Football League.

== Organization in the United States ==
Befitting its status as a popular sport, football is played in leagues of different size, age and quality, in all regions of the country. A team / academy may be referred to as a 'football program' – not to be confused with football program.

There is no single national governing body for American football in the United States or a continental governing body for North America. There is an international governing body, the International Federation of American Football, or IFAF.

=== Women's Professional Football League ===
The Women's Professional American Football League (WPFL) was a women's professional American football league in the United States, It was founded in 1965 by talent agent Sid Friedman, for exhibition games. It started with four teams:

- The Cleveland Daredevils of Cleveland, Ohio,
- The Pittsburgh All-Stars of Pittsburgh, Pennsylvania (later renamed the Hurricanes and then the Powderkegs)
- The Canadian Belles of Toronto, Ontario
- and the Detroit Petticoats of Detroit, Michigan.

Among the WPFL best players can be named Marcella Sanborn (from The Daredevils) and Carole Duffy and Linda Rae Hodge (from the Powderkegs). The WPFL ceased operations in 1973. The WPFL operated again between 1999 and 2007 as a fall league and not a spring league with its first game in 1999. The teams in the league were:

- Lake Michigan Minx
- Minnesota Vixen
- Los Angeles Amazons
- Southern California Breakers

=== Independent Women's Football League ===
Independent Women's Football League (IWFL) was the first Women's American football league established by women players for women players. The league was founded in 2000, began play in 2001, and played its last season in 2018. The players were amateur/semi pro and had to cover part of their expenses. Among its teams can be named the Southern California Breakers, and the Austin Outlaws.

=== Women's American Football League ===
The Women's American Football League was a women's American football league that was formed in 2001. After disbanding, the teams merged with the Women's Affiliated Football Conference (WAFC), the Independent Women's Football League (IWFL), Women's Football Association (WFA), and the American Football Women's League (AFWL).

=== American Football Women's League ===
The American Football Women's League (AFWL) which debuted on May 15, 2002, was one of the first women's football leagues formed, originally using the name WAFL, or Women's American Football League in 2001. The AFWL officially disbanded in March 2003, due to money and attendance problems.

=== Women's Football Association ===
The Women's Football Association was a women's American football league formed in 2002 and which folded in 2003. Many of the league's members had been part of the Women's American Football League. Its teams were: Birmingham Steel Magnolias, Georgia Enforcers, Indianapolis Vipers, New Orleans Voodoo Dolls, Carolina Crusaders, Jacksonville Dixie Blues, Orlando Fire, and Tampa Bay Force.

=== X League (women's football) ===
The Extreme Football League (X League) is an American women's semi-professional tackle football league. The league was originally founded in 2009 as the Lingerie Football League (LFL), and later rebranded as the Legends Football League in 2013.

X League operates with 8 teams: Arizona Red Devils, Austin Acoustic, Atlanta Empire, Chicago Blitz, Denver Rush, Kansas City Force, Los Angeles Black Storm, Seattle Thunder.

== United States women's national American football team ==
The United States women's national American football team represents the United States in international women's American football competitions. It competes in the IFAF Women's World Championship where is currently ranked no.1.

The United States women's national American football team is controlled by USA Football and is recognized by the International Federation of American Football (IFAF).

== See also ==
- American football
- Women's American football
- American football in the United States
- United States women's national American football team
- IFAF Women's World Championship
- List of American and Canadian football leagues
- List of female American football teams
- List of female American football players
