= Linda Jefferson =

American football player

Linda Jefferson is an American former American football player.

== Football career ==
Jefferson began playing for the Toledo Troopers in the National Women’s Football League (NWFL) in 1972 and became one of its top, most well-respected players. In her first season she ran 1,300+ yards and 32 touchdowns. Over the next four years she averaged 14.4 yards per carry. She has five undefeated seasons to her name.

== Awards and media ==
Jefferson was described as “the legend of Toledo women’s football, no, the legend of Toledo football, full stop.” She was described as having “broken the glass ceiling” with the team. In 1975 WomenSports Magazine named her the first ever “Woman Athlete of the Year.” The following year, as the league’s Player of the Year, she appeared on the ABC television network’s Women Superstars competition and finished fourth. In addition, throughout the 1970s, she appeared on many shows, including To Tell the Truth, The Today Show and The Dinah Shore Show. She also participated in ABC's "The Superstars".

In 2002, she was inducted into the Semi-Pro Football Hall of Fame. She was the first African American woman to receive the honor. As well, she is one of only four women inducted into the American Association Football Hall of Fame. She was determined to be a winner: ‘‘I knew early on that I’d be the best because that’s the goal I set for myself.’’ As running back for the Toledo Troopers from 1971 to 1979, she led the team to a six-year winning streak in the National Women's Football League, a record in both men's and women's professional football.
