= Vernice Armour =

United States Marine Corps pilot

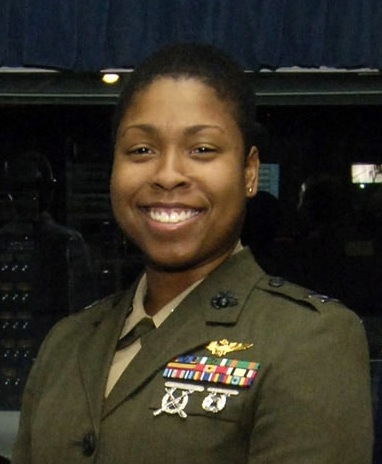
- Armour in January 2006
- Born: September 23, 1973 (age 53); Chicago, Illinois, U.S.
- Relatives: Gaston C. Armour Jr. (Father, Army); Clarence Jackson (Step-father, Marine Corps); Authurine Jackson (mother)
- Military career
- Allegiance: United States
- Branch: United States Marine Corps
- Service years: 1993–2007
- Rank: Captain
- Nickname: FlyGirl
- Unit: HMLA-169
- Conflicts: Iraq War; Operation Iraqi Freedom; Invasion of Iraq; Battle of Najaf
- Awards: Air Medal; Navy and Marine Corps Commendation Medal; Navy and Marine Corps Achievement Medal; Presidential Unit Citation; National Defense Service Medal; Iraq Campaign Medal; Global War on Terrorism Expeditionary Medal; Global War on Terrorism Service Medal; Sea Service Deployment Ribbon
- Other work: Zero to Breakthrough(TM) Expert, professional keynote speaker, law enforcement officer

Vernice "FlyGirl" Armour (born September 23, 1973) is a former United States Marine Corps officer who was the first African-American female naval aviator in the Marine Corps and the Marine Corps first black female combat pilot. She flew the AH-1W SuperCobra attack helicopter in the 2003 invasion of Iraq and eventually served two tours in support of Operation Iraqi Freedom.

== Early life and education ==
Armour was born in 1973 in Chicago, Illinois to Gaston Armour Jr. and Authurine Armour. After her parents divorced, Clarence Jackson married Authurine. Both her father and her stepfather had served in the military - Gaston Armour was a retired major in the U.S. Army Reserve, and Clarence Jackson was a former Marine Corps sergeant who served three tours in Vietnam. Her grandfather was a Montford Point Marine, the first African Americans to integrate the Marine Corps between 1942 and 1949.

Raised in Memphis, Tennessee, Armour graduated from Overton High School, where she was a member of the mathematics honor society, the National Honor Society, and class vice-president.

== Career ==
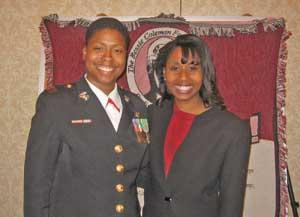
Capt. Vernice Armour and NASA astronaut Stephanie Wilson receiving award from the Bessie Coleman Foundation

In 1993, while a student at Middle Tennessee State University (MTSU), Armour enlisted in the U.S. Army Reserve and later entered into the U.S. Army's ROTC.

In 1996, she took time off from college to become a Nashville police officer (her childhood dream). She became the first female African-American on the motorcycle squad.

Armour graduated from MTSU in 1997. In 1998, Armour became the first African American female to serve as a police officer in Tempe, Arizona before joining the U.S. Marines as an Officer Candidate in October 1998.

Commissioned a second lieutenant on December 12, 1998, Armour was sent to flight school at Naval Air Station Corpus Christi, Texas and later Naval Air Station Pensacola, Florida. Earning her wings in July 2001, Armour was not only number one in her class of twelve, she was number one among the last two hundred graduates. She became the Marine Corps' first African-American female pilot.

After flight school, Armour was assigned to Marine Corps Base Camp Pendleton near San Diego, California for training in the AH-1W SuperCobra. While at Camp Pendleton, she was named 2001 Camp Pendleton Female Athlete of the Year, twice won the Camp's annual Strongest Warrior Competition, and was a running back for the San Diego Sunfire women's football team.

In March 2003, she flew with HMLA-169 during the invasion of Iraq becoming the Marine Corps first black female combat pilot. She completed two combat tours in the Gulf. Afterwards, she was assigned to the Manpower and Reserve Affairs Equal Opportunity Branch as program liaison officer.

== Personal life ==
Leaving the U.S. Marine Corps in June 2007, Armour began a career as a professional speaker and expert on creating breakthroughs in life.

In 2011, her book Zero to Breakthrough: The 7-Step, Battle-Tested Method for Accomplishing Goals that Matter was published.

== Awards and decorations ==

Badge	Naval Aviator Badge		
1st row	Air Medal w/ 1 award star, Valor device, and Strike/Flight numeral "13"	Navy and Marine Corps Commendation Medal w/ valor device	Navy and Marine Corps Achievement Medal
3rd row	Navy Presidential Unit Citation w/ 1 service star	National Defense Service Medal w/ 1 service star	Iraq Campaign Medal
4th row	Global War on Terrorism Expeditionary Medal	Global War on Terrorism Service Medal	Navy Sea Service Deployment Ribbon w/ 1 service star
Badges	Expert Rifle Badge		Expert Pistol Badge

== See also ==
- List of United States Marines
- List of African-American firsts
