= National Women's Football League (disambiguation) =

The National Women's Football League was a women's American football league from 1974 to 1988.

National Women's Football League may also refer to:

- National Women's Football Association, a full-contact American football league from 2000 to 2008
- National Women's Football League of Guatemala, association football league founded in 1997
