= Toledo Troopers =

American football team

- Founded: 1971
- Folded: 1980
- League: Women's Professional Football League (WPFL) 1971–1973; National Women's Football League (NWFL) 1974–1979
- Based in: Toledo, Ohio
- Stadium: Whitmer Memorial Stadium/ Waite Stadium
- Colors: gold, green
- Owner: Bill Stout, S.K.W. Enterprises, Inc.
- Championships: 7 (1971-1977)
- Website: toledotroopers.com

The Toledo Troopers were a professional women's American football team based in Toledo, Ohio.

The Troopers began play in 1971 as a member of the Women's Professional Football League (WPFL), and later played in the National Women's Football League (NWFL). The franchise folded before the 1980 season, after it was put up for sale by the owner.

The Troopers hold the record for most championship titles in women’s football history after winning seven "World Championships" (1971 through 1977). In 1983, the Troopers were recognized as the "winningest team in professional football history" at the Pro Football Hall of Fame, and they were also the first team to be inducted into Women's Foundation Football Hall of Fame in 2014.

During the team's existence, the players were paid $25 a month. The best known player on the team was Linda Jefferson who was named womenSports magazine's Athlete of the Year in 1975. She would become the first Black woman inducted into the Semi-Pro Football Hall of Fame. She’s also one of only four women in the American Association Football Hall of Fame.

== Season-by-season ==
Year	W	L	T	Finish	Coach
1971	3	0	0	WPFL Champions by record	Bill Stout
1972	9	0	0	WPFL Champions by record	Bill Stout
1973	3	0	0	Champions by record (independent)	Bill Stout
1974	5	0	0	NWFL Champions by record	Bill Stout
1975	8	0	0	NWFL Champions by record	Bill Stout
1976	10	1	1	NWFL co-champions (Oklahoma City Dolls)	Bill Stout
1977	8	0	0	Won NWFL Championship (Oklahoma City Dolls)	Bill Stout
1978	8	1	0	Lost NWFL Championship (Oklahoma City Dolls)	Mike Stout
1979	4	2	0	Lost NWFL Northern Division Championship (Columbus Pacesetters)	Mike Stout
Totals	58	4	1	7 Championship Titles	
