= Utah Blitz =

Women's football team

- Founded: 2009
- League: Women's Football Alliance
- Team history: Utah Blitz (2009-present) New Management as of Aug 2013
- Based in: Taylorsville, Utah
- Stadium: Taylorsville High School
- Colors: Black, Red, Silver
- Owner: Jennifer Heskett

The Utah Blitz is a team of the Women's Football Alliance (WFA) which began play in the 2010 season. Based in Salt Lake City, Utah, the Blitz plays its home games at Taylorsville High School in Taylorsville.

== Season-by-season ==
Season records
Season	W	L	T	Finish	Playoff results
2010	0	7	0	3rd American North Pacific	--
2011	3	5	0	2nd American Northwest	--
2012*	0	4	0	3rd WFA American 14	--
2013	0	7	0	WFA	
2014	4	4	0	4th WFA American Pacific region/northwest	
2015	2	4	0	2nd WFA American Mountain West Conference	
Totals	9	30	0		

== Season Schedules ==
=== 2017 ===
Date	Opponent	Home/Away	Result
April 1	Ventura County Wolfpack	Away	Won 34-0
April 8	New Mexico Las Cruces	Home	Lost 0-12
April 22	Thunderkatz	Away	Lost in OT 6-14
April 29	Mile High Blaze	Home	Lost 0-35
May 13	Wildkats	Away	Won 60-0
May 20	Thunderkatz	Home	Won 14-8
May 27	Mile High Blaze	Away	Lost 0-77
June 3	Wildkats	Home	Won 48-0

== 2011 ==
=== Standings ===
2011 Northwest Division
	W	L	T	PCT	PF	PA	DIV	GB	STK
y-Portland Fighting Fillies	4	4	0	0.500	46	152	4-1	---	W1
Utah Blitz	3	5	0	0.375	98	150	3-2	1.0	W2
Spokane Scorn	1	7	0	0.125	60	142	1-5	3.0	L3

=== Season schedule ===
Date	Opponent	Home/Away	Result
April 2	Spokane Scorn	Home	Won 0-40
April 9	Central Cal War Angels	Home	Lost 0-38
April 16	Portland Fighting Fillies	Away	Lost 0-6
May 7	Silver State Legacy	Away	Lost 0-44
May 14	Las Vegas Showgirlz	Home	Lost 0-14
May 21	Spokane Scorn	Away	Lost 20-26
June 4	Portland Fighting Fillies	Home	Won 0-8
June 11	Spokane Scorn	Away	Won 0-22

== 2012 ==
=== Season schedule ===
Date	Opponent	Home/Away	Result
April 14	Silver State Legacy	Away	
April 21	Utah Jynx	Home	
April 28	Las Vegas Showgirlz	Home	
May 5	Tacoma Trauma	Away	
May 19	Portland Fighting Fillies	Away	
June 2	Tacoma Trauma	Home	
June 9	Utah Jynx	Away	
June 16	Portland Fighting Fillies	Home	
