= Melissa Strother =

American arena football player (born 1982)

No. 18
- Position: Kicker

Personal information
- Born: November 4, 1982 (age 44); Covina, California, U.S.

Career information
- College: Azusa Pacific

Career history

Playing
- 2022: Rapid City Marshals
- 2024: Washington Wolfpack

Coaching
- 2025–present: Washington Wolfpack

Melissa Strother (born November 4, 1982, in Covina, California) is an American football player who was the first woman to score points in an Arena Football League game when she did so for the Washington Wolfpack in 2024.

She played college soccer at Azusa Pacific University in the 2000s and was recruited to play for the California Quakes, a women's American football team based in Long Beach, California. She later played for the San Diego Surge and the United States women's national American football team and has also served as an athletic trainer for the Los Angeles Rams.

In 2022, Strother played for the Rapid City Marshals during her first stint with men's football. She joined the Washington Wolfpack for the inaugural 2024 Arena Football League season. In June 2024, Strother kicked their game-winning point against the Southwest Kansas Storm with less than 4 seconds remaining, becoming the first woman to score in an AFL game.

In December 2024, Strother announced her retirement as a player but continued to coach for the Wolfpack, acting as their special teams coordinator. She was succeeded as the Wolfpack kicker by Manny Higuera.

Strohther's memoir, Play For Her was published in 2023.
