= Ventura Black Widows =

American women's tackle football team

- Founded: 2008
- League: National Women's Football Association (NWFA) WFA (planning stages); Independent (2009); Women's Spring Football League (2010-2013); Independent Women's Football League (2014)
- Team history: Ventura Black Widows 2009-present
- Based in: Ventura, California
- Stadium: TBD
- Colors: Black, Red and White
- President: Ahmad Newton
- Head coach: Ahmad Newton
- Championships: 0

The Ventura Black Widows, a women's tackle football Tier 3 team, was founded in 2008 by Ahmad Newton of Los Angeles, CA. Originally a member of the National Women’s Football Association (NWFA), they became independent when the league folded later that same year. Shortly after, an up-start league, the WFA, invited the Ventura Black Widows to join. Due to the Black Widows' small roster, the team The team competed in an 8-on-8 format. After two independent seasons, the Black Widows were invited to join the Women’s Spring Football League in 2010. During their tenure in the WSFL, the VBW won two Southwest Division titles: taking the first one in 2011 and the second in 2013. The next year saw them join the Independent Women's Football League (IWFL) where they continue their active membership.

As part of their commitment to the Black Widows, each team member on the roster is expected to participate in fundraisers throughout the season. Monies collected help pay for field permits and fees, travel expenses, team and league dues. The sale of team merchandise, popular among local residents, also helps meet these financial requirements. The IWFL mandates that all players furnish their own league-approved uniforms and safety equipment. Players and coaches alike report that being personally invested in the welfare of the team enhances their experience by building camaraderie and fostering strong team bonds.

== Season-by-Season ==
Season records
Season	W	L	T	Finish	Playoff results
2009	2	2	0		

=== 2009 ===
Date	Opponent	Home/Away	Result
March 28	California Lynx	Away Fresno @ Selland Arena	Lost 36-0
May 2	Boise Broncos	Home	Lost 48-0
May 16	AV Attack	Home	Win* Forfeit 2-0
May 23	AV Attack	Away	Win* Forfeit 2-0

=== 2010 ===
Date	Opponent	Home/Away	Result

== Schedule ==
The schedule on the team's website says that the Black Widows will play the Las Vegas Showgirlz of the Women's Football Alliance on March 20, the Boise Broncos on May 1 and 29, and the Topeka Mudcats on July 24. The Ventura Black Widows have played against teams: NorCal Red Hawks, Boise Broncos, California Lynx, Utah Jynx, Portland Fighting Fillies, Reno Rattlers, Nevada Storm, Salt City Arch Angels, TC (Tulare County) Villainz and River City Raiderz (Hillsboro, OR).

03/28/2009 vs California Lynx Fresno, CA @ Selland Arena Ventura Black Widows w/ Santa Rosa Scorchers
