= Empire State Roar =

- Founded: 2005
- League: WPFL (2005-2007)
- Based in: Rochester, New York
- Stadium: East High School (Rochester, New York)
- Colors: Black, gold, white
- President: Sandra Rogers
- Head coach: John Evans
- Championships: 0

The Empire State Roar was a women's tackle football team in Rochester, New York. They played at East High School (Rochester, New York). The team was a member of the Women's Professional Football League (WPFL) for three football seasons, 2005–2007.

== History ==
The Empire State Roar followed the Rochester Raptors of the National Women's Football Association (NWFA) and the Syracuse Sting of the WPFL both of which had folded in 2004.

The Roar was established in 2005 by former Rochester Raptors and Syracuse Sting lineswoman Sandra Rogers, who was said to have merged the two teams into one. The team joined the WPFL as an exhibition team in 2005, and became a full member of the league in 2006.

The Roar's most successful season was 2007 when, under Head Coach John Evans, they won the Northern Division with an 8–0 regular season. The team fell in the playoffs to the eventual league champion So Cal Scorpions. Notably, Empire State Roar home games were broadcast on Finger Lakes TV Channel 12 for the 2007 season.

The WPFL ceased operations after the 2007 season, leaving the Roar without a league. The team did not play in 2008.

== Season-by-season ==
Season records
Season	W	L	T	Finish	Playoff results
Empire State Roar (WPFL)
2005	2	4	0	Exhibition Season	--
2006	4	3	0	2nd American East	--
2007	8	1	0	1st American East	Lost American Conference Championship (SoCal)
Totals	14	8	0		
