= San Diego Sting =

Professional American football team

- Founded: 2010
- League: Women's Football Alliance
- Team history: San Diego Sting (2010-2013)
- Based in: Carlsbad, California
- Stadium: Carlsbad High School
- Colors: Navy blue, silver, white
- President: Annette Nerey
- Head coach: Charles Daniel
- Championships: 0

The San Diego Sting were a women's professional football team based in Carlsbad, California, that competed in the Women's Football Alliance (WFA). The team played its home games at Carlsbad High School. The Sting ceased operations after the 2012 season.

The Sting were one of two San Diego teams in the WFA, the other one being the San Diego Surge.

== Season-by-season ==
Season records
Season	W	L	T	Finish	Playoff results
2010	0	8	0	4th American South Pacific	--
2011	1	7	0	4th American Southwest	--
2012*	1	2	0	2nd WFA American 15	--
Totals	2	17	0		

* = Current standing

== 2011 roster ==
San Diego Sting roster
Quarterbacks: 1 Shellmadean Blythe; 2 Akilah Green; 36 Christine Wright; 45 Annaleii Ulukita; Running backs: 5 Katelyn Daniel; 22 Ashley Lawless; 26 Sharne Washington; 35 Jennifer Meneray; 43 Taylor Blunt; 70 Kassandra Hernandez; Receivers: 3 Autumn Wright; 6 Ashley Temple; 9 Rosa Barr; 11 Lauren Sjursen; 23 Jessica Ripley; 24 Sage Jacobucci; 30 Jane Brinkman (TE)	Offensive line: 38 Lesly Lara; 44 Annette Nerey; 52 Patricia McClain; 65 Yadira Moreno; 66 Trish Toppings; 68 Brandy Clarke; 77 Leigh Parcel; 84 Katrina Morin; 88 Kara Ballew; Defensive line: 16 Wendy Herrera; 50 Cassandra Torres; 55 Ella Jones; 56 Alofa Laie; 58 Sherraye; 69 Melissa DeVilla; 78 Sina Laie; 81 Jessica Schwartz; Linebackers: 31 Cheree Zarty	Defensive backs: 0 Oprah Blythe; Special teams: currently vacant; Multiple Positions: 12 Sasha Duran (P/K)	Injured reserve: currently vacant; Exempt List: currently vacant; Practice squad: currently vacant; rookies in italics; Roster updated May 2, 2011; 37 Active, 0 Inactive, 0 PS

== 2010 ==
=== Season schedule ===
Date	Opponent	Home/Away	Result
April 10	Central Cal War Angels	Away	Lost 18-26
April 17	Pacific Warriors	Away	Lost 0-41
April 24	Arizona Assassins	Home	Lost 0-52
May 8	Arizona Assassins	Away	Lost 0-42
May 15	Pacific Warriors	Home	Lost 0-6**
May 22	Central Cal War Angels	Home	Lost 0-6**
June 5	Arizona Assassins	Away	Lost 6-24
June 12	Central Cal War Angels	Home	Lost 0-6**

** = Forfeited

== 2011 ==
=== Standings ===
2011 Southwest Division
	W	L	T	PCT	PF	PA	DIV	GB	STK
y-Silver State Legacy	6	2	0	0.750	199	79	5-1	---	W3
Arizona Assassins	6	2	0	0.750	207	103	5-1	---	W1
So Cal Scorpions	2	6	0	0.250	37	111	2-4	4.0	L4
San Diego Sting	1	7	0	0.125	38	239	0-6	5.0	W1

=== Season schedule ===
Date	Opponent	Home/Away	Result
April 2	So Cal Scorpions	Home	Lost 0-16
April 9	Pacific Warriors	Home	Lost 0-40
April 16	Silver State Legacy	Home	Lost 0-42
April 30	Arizona Assassins	Away	Lost 6-47
May 7	So Cal Scorpions	Away	Lost 6-12
May 21	Silver State Legacy	Away	Lost 0-35
June 4	Arizona Assassins	Home	Lost 6-41
June 11	Las Vegas Showgirlz	Away	Won 20-6

== 2012 ==
=== Season schedule ===
Date	Opponent	Home/Away	Result
April 14	Pacific Warriors	Away	
April 28	Los Angeles Amazons	Home	
May 5	Las Vegas Showgirlz	Home	
May 12	Los Angeles Amazons	Away	
May 19	Arizona Assassins	Away	
May 26	West Coast Lightning	Home	
June 9	Los Angeles Amazons	Home	
June 16	Las Vegas Showgirlz	Away	
