= National Women's Football League =

- Most recent season or competition: 2003
- Sport: American football
- Founded: 1974
- Folded: 1989
- No. of teams: 21 total
- Country: United States
- Most titles: Toledo Troopers (4)

The National Women's Football League (NWFL) was a women's American football league that operated from 1974 to 1988.

== Background ==
The first attempts to formalize women's gridiron football came about during the 1960s when Sid Friedman, an entrepreneur, created the Women's Professional Football League (WPFL). The league's approach was considered exploitative but the league resulted in the creation of a number of teams that later formed the NWFL.

== History ==
The NWFL was formed in 1974, originally consisting of seven teams. Its creation came about due to a belief that women's football was an unserved market. Players were paid around $25 a game. Teams were typically located in less populous towns and more rural settings.

A NWFL game was televised for the time in August 1975 but coverage of the league remained limited. What coverage the league achieved was often dismissive and played on various gender stereotypes.

Linda Jefferson, a running back with Toledo Troopers, was inducted into the American football Association Hall of Fame. and was named the 1975 Athlete of the Year by womenSports.

The NFWL began to fragment towards the end of the 1970s when ten teams broke off to form the Western States Women's Professional Football League. The league ceased in 1988 and its failure was attributed to limited funding, a lack of media coverage and support, and poor organization.

The new NWFL was created again in 2000 by Donna Materson and ran for 2 years before they changed their name to the NWFA (national woman's football association), due to the NFL threatening to sue.

== Rules ==
The NWFL followed customary rules of 11-on-11 gridiron football with the exception of extra point attempts. In the NWFL, a successful kick attempt was awarded two points and a successful rush or pass attempt was awarded one point.

== Teams ==
- Toledo Troopers (founding team) (1974–1979)
- Los Angeles Dandelions (founding team) (1974–1978)
- California Mustangs (founding team) (1974–1978)
- Columbus Pacesetters (founding team) (1974–1988)
- Dallas Bluebonnets (founding team) (1974)
- Fort Worth Shamrocks (founding team) (1974–1977)
- Detroit Demons (founding team) (1974–1977)
- Middletown Mavericks (1975–1979)
- San Diego Lobos (1975–1976)
- Oklahoma City Dolls (1976–1979)
- Houston Herricanes (1976–1979)
- Pasadena Roses (1976-)
- Philadelphia Queen Bees (1976-)
- San Antonio Flames (1976-)
- Tulsa Babes (1976–1978)
- Lawton Tornados (1977–1979)
- Cleveland Brewers (1979–1986)
- Battle Creek Rainbows (1980–1983)
- Grand Rapids Carpenters (1983–1987)
- Toledo Furies (1983–1987)
- Lansing Unicorns (1986)

A few NWFL teams existed before the formation of the league in 1974, namely the Toledo Troopers (est. 1971), Dallas Bluebonnets (est. 1972), Detroit Demons (est. 1972), and Los Angeles Dandelions (est. 1973).

== League Championships ==
Year	Champion	Runner-up	Score
1974	Toledo Troopers	–	no game †
1975	Toledo Troopers	–	no game †
1976	Toledo Troopers, Oklahoma City Dolls	–	13-12 ††
1977	Toledo Troopers	Oklahoma City Dolls	25-14
1978	Oklahoma City Dolls	Toledo Troopers	8-0
1979	Oklahoma City Dolls	Columbus Pacesetters	no game †††
1980	Columbus Pacesetters		
1981	Columbus Pacesetters		
1982	Cleveland Brewers	Columbus Pacesetters	12-18 ††††
1983	Cleveland Brewers	Columbus Pacesetters	43-6
1984	Toledo Furies	Cleveland Brewers	34-6
1985	Grand Rapids Carpenters	Toledo Furies	
1986	Grand Rapids Carpenters	Toledo Furies	
1987	Grand Rapids Carpenters	Toledo Furies	
1988			

† In 1974 and 1975, the NWFL Champion was determined on basis of win-loss record. No playoffs or championship games were held.

†† Toledo initially claimed a 13–12 victory over Oklahoma City after a 2-point kick attempt by the Dolls was ruled no good. However, after further review of game film by league officials, the game was declared a 13–13 tie, and the two teams had to share the league title.

††† The championship game was not played, and Oklahoma City was awarded the league title administratively.

†††† While Columbus initially claimed a 18–12 victory in double overtime, Cleveland later successfully protested the officiating of the game. A league oversight committee found that three of the four officials hired by the Pacesetters were not sanctioned according to NWFL bylaws. The committee awarded the Brewers a 20-0 forfeit victory and the league title.

== See also ==
- Women's American football
- Women's Football Alliance
- United States Women's Football League
- Independent Women's Football League
