= Women's Professional Football League (1965–1973) =

The Women's Professional Football League (WPFL) was the first American football league for women. It was founded in 1965 by talent agent Sid Friedman, for exhibition games. The WPFL ceased operations in 1973.

== History ==
The WPFL started with four teams:

- The Cleveland Daredevils of Cleveland, Ohio,
- The Pittsburgh All-Stars of Pittsburgh, Pennsylvania,
- The Canadian Belles of Toronto, Ontario
- And the Detroit Petticoats of Detroit, Michigan.

The Daredevils, the first women's football team of the era, featured one of the top players, Marcella Sanborn.

The All Stars, the second women's team to be established, were later renamed the Hurricanes and then the Powderkegs. Two of the best players played for the Powderkegs, Carole Duffy and Linda Rae Hodge.

The WPFL primarily played exhibition and charity games. However, they also played during some halftime shows for NFL and CFL teams. There were actual games with these generally numbering four or five games a year.

=== Expansion ===
By 1971, the WPFL had more teams, and it was divided into an East Division and a West Division.

==== Eastern Division ====
The teams in the

- Buffalo,
- New York,
- Cleveland,
- Toronto,
- Pittsburgh,
- Bowling Green, Kentucky,
- Cincinnati, Ohio,
- Dayton, Ohio
- Detroit, Michigan (the Detroit Cowgirls)
- and the New York team, that was originally named New York Fillies but then became the NY Hurricanes.

==== Western Division ====
The Western Division included the following teams:

- Vancouver, British Columbia,
- Seattle, Washington,
- Portland, Oregon,
- Los Angeles
- and San Francisco.

== End of the league ==
By 1973, all WPFL teams had disbanded except for the Toledo Troopers of Toledo, Ohio. Unbeknownst to Friedman, the Troopers coach, Bill Stout, had trademarked the Troopers name and logo. The Troopers then joined the new National Women's Football League (NWFL).

== Women's Professional Football League (1999–2007) ==
Women's Professional Football League WPFL operated again between 1999 and 2007 as a fall league and not a spring league.

== See also ==
- American football in the United States
- List of female American football players
- List of American and Canadian football leagues
