= Arizona Assassins =

Former women's semi-pro American football team

- Founded: 2010
- League: Women's Football Alliance
- Team history: Arizona Assassins (2010–2015)
- Based in: Gilbert, Arizona
- Stadium: Washington High School (Phoenix, Arizona)
- Colors: Green, black, white
- President: Dee Richards
- Head coach: Dee Richards
- Championships: 0

The Arizona Assassins were a women's semi-professional American football team founded in 2010. The Assassins were members of the Women's Football Alliance. Based in Gilbert, Arizona, the Assassins played their home games on the campus of Washington High School (Phoenix, Arizona).

== Season-by-season ==
Season records
Season	W	L	T	Finish	Playoff results
2010	3	5	0	3rd American South Pacific	––
2011	6	3	0	2nd American Southwest	
2012	0	8	0	4th American South Pacific	––
2013	0	7	0	5th American South Pacific	––
2014	0	7	0	3rd American Pacific South	––
2015	3	5	0	2nd American Pacific South	––
Totals	12	35	0		

== 2010 ==
=== Season schedule ===
Date	Opponent	Home/Away	Result
April 17	Las Vegas Showgirlz	Home	Lost 6–26
April 24	San Diego Sting	Away	Won 52–0
May 1	Pacific Warriors	Away	Lost 26–34
May 8	San Diego Sting	Home	Won 42–0
May 15	Las Vegas Showgirlz	Away	Lost 8–48
May 22	Pacific Warriors	Home	Lost 8–20
June 5	San Diego Sting	Home	Won 24–6
June 19	Las Vegas Showgirlz	Away	Lost 0–31

== 2011 ==
=== Standings ===
2011 Southwest Division
	W	L	T	PCT	PF	PA	DIV	GB	STK
y-Silver State Legacy	6	2	0	0.750	199	79	5-1	---	W3
Arizona Assassins	6	2	0	0.750	207	103	5-1	---	W1
So Cal Scorpions	2	6	0	0.250	37	111	2-4	4.0	L4
San Diego Sting	1	7	0	0.125	38	239	0-6	5.0	W1

=== Season schedule ===
Date	Opponent	Home/Away	Result
April 9	Silver State Legacy	Home	Won 21–8
April 16	So Cal Scorpions	Away	Won 39–0
April 30	San Diego Sting	Home	Won 47–6
May 7	San Diego Surge	Away	Lost 20–55
May 21	So Cal Scorpions	Home	Won 1–0**
June 4	San Diego Sting	Away	Won 41–6
June 11	Silver State Legacy	Away	Lost 7–22
June 18	Pacific Warriors	Home	Won 26–6
July 23	Utah Jynx	Away	Lost 20–34

** = Won by forfeit

== 2012 ==
=== Season schedule ===
Date	Opponent	Home/Away	Result
April 14	Las Vegas Showgirlz	Away	
April 21	Pacific Warriors	Home	
April 28	San Diego Surge	Home	
May 5	Silver State Legacy	Away	
May 19	San Diego Sting	Home	
June 2	Pacific Warriors	Away	
June 9	San Diego Surge	Away	
June 16	Silver State Legacy	Home	
