= Central Cal War Angels =

American women's soccer team

- Founded: 2010
- Dissolved: 2017
- League: Women's Football Alliance
- Team history: Central Cal War Angels (2010-2017)
- Based in: Fresno, California
- Stadium: Fresno City College
- Colors: Black, gold, and white
- President: Jeff & Lisa King
- Head coach: Casey Quinn
- Championships: 0

The Central Cal War Angels were a team of the Women's Football Alliance which began play for the 2010 season. Based in Fresno, California, the War Angels played their home games on the campus of Fresno City College.

== Season-by-season ==
Season	W	L	T	Finish	Playoff results	Bowl Game
2010	4	5	0	2nd American North Pacific	--	
2011	6	2	0	2nd American North Pacific	--	
2012	7	3	0	2nd American 16	1-1	
2013	11	1	0	1st American 12	3-1	
2014	6	3	0	1st American Pacific West	1-1	
2015	6	3	0	3rd American Pacific West	0-1	Won National Alliance Bowl, 28-8
2016	8	1	0	1st American Pacific	1-1	
Totals	48	18	0	--	6-5	1-0

== 2010 ==
=== Standings ===
2010 North Pacific Division
	W	L	T	PCT	PF	PA	DIV	GB	STK
y-Portland Fighting Fillies	6	2	0	0.750	135	111	6-0	---	
Central Cal War Angels	4	5	0	0.444	154	161	1-3	---	
Utah Blitz	0	7	0	0.000	24	211	0-4	--	

'''y''' = Clinched Division Title

=== Season schedule ===
2010	Schedule	Home/Away	Opponent	Result
4/10/10	War Angels	vs	San Diego Sting	Won 26-18
4/17/10	War Angels	vs	Portland Fighting Fillies	Lost 21-26
4/24/10	War Angels	@	Pacific Warriors	Lost 29-34
5/1/10	War Angels	@	Portland Fighting Fillies	Lost 8-19
5/15/10	War Angels	vs	Utah Blitz	Won 26-7
5/22/10	War Angels	@	San Diego Sting	Won 6-0**
6/5/10	War Angels	vs	Pacific Warriors	Lost 18-41
6/12/10	War Angels	@	San Diego Sting	Won 6-0**
6/19/10	War Angels	@	Portland Fighting Fillies	Lost 14-16

** = Won by forfeit

== 2011 ==
=== Standings ===
2011 North Pacific Division
	W	L	T	PCT	PF	PA	DIV	GB	STK
y-Bay Area Bandits	7	3	0	0.750	223	72	4-1	---	L1
Central Cal War Angels	6	2	0	0.750	232	53	3-2	---	W4
Los Angeles Amazons	1	7	0	0.125	6	263	0-4	5.5	W1

'''y''' = Clinched Division Title

=== Season schedule ===
2011	Schedule	Home/Away	Opponent	Result
4/9/11	War Angels	@	Utah Blitz	Won 38-0
4/30/11	War Angels	vs	Bay Area Bandits	Lost 6-11
5/7/11	War Angels	@	Los Angeles Amazons	Won 1-0**
5/14/11	War Angels	@	Bay Area Bandits	Lost 0-19
5/21/11	War Angels	vs	Los Angeles Amazons	Won 68-0
6/4/11	War Angels	@	Pacific Warriors	Won 30-8
6/11/10	War Angels	vs	Portland Fighting Fillies	Won 60-0
6/18/11	War Angels	vs	Bay Area Bandits	Won 24-15

** = Won by forfeit

== 2012 ==
=== Standings ===
2012 Division 16
	W	L	T	PCT	PF	PA	DIV	GB	STK
y-Bay Area Bandits	8	2	0	0.800	324	7151	7-0	---	
Central Cal War Angels	7	3	0	0.700	352	125	4-3	---	
West Coast Lightning	2	6	0	0.250	69	234	2-4	---	
Valley Vipers	1	7	0	0.125	12	334	0-6	---	

'''y''' = Clinched Division Title

=== Season schedule ===
2012	Schedule	Home/Away	Opponent	Result
4/14/12	War Angels	@	Los Angeles Amazons	Won 46-0
4/21/12	War Angels	vs	Valley Vipers	Won 66-0
4/28/12	War Angels	vs	West Coast Lightning	Won 42-7
5/12/12	War Angels	@	Bay Area Bandits	Lost 18-20
5/19/12	War Angels	vs	Pacific Warriors	Won 30-12
6/2/12	War Angels	@	Valley Vipers	Won 46-0
6/9/12	War Angels	@	West Coast Lightning	Won 40-0
6/16/12	War Angels	vs	Bay Area Bandits	Loss 20-26 Double OT
6/23/12	War Angels	@	Utah Jynx	Playoff Round 1 Won 36-26
6/30/12	War Angels	@	Bay Area Bandits	Playoff Round 2 Loss 34-8

== 2013 ==
=== Standings ===
2013 Division 12
	W	L	T	PCT	PF	PA	DIV	GB	STK
y-Central Cal War Angels	11	1	0	0.917	434	95	9-1	---	
Sacramento Sirens	6	4	0	0.600	221	192	2-4	---	
Valley Vipers	0	0	0	0.000	0	0	0-0	---	

'''y''' = Clinched Division Title

=== Season schedule ===
2013	Schedule	Home/Away	Opponent	Result
4/6/13	War Angels	vs	Las Vegas Showgirlz	Won 42-6
4/13/13	War Angels	@	Sacramento Sirens	Won 24-6
4/20/13	War Angels	vs	Pacific Warriors	Won 55-0
5/4/13	War Angels	@	Pacific Warriors	Won 20-8
5/11/13	War Angels	vs	Non-League Opponent	Won 49-22
5/18/13	War Angels	@	San Diego Sting	Won 42-0
6/1/13	War Angels	@	Non-League Opponent	Won 1-0**
6/8/13	War Angels	vs	Sacramento Sirens	Won 55-6
6/15/13	War Angels	vs	Portland Shockwave	Playoff Round 1 Won 34-0
6/22/13	War Angels	vs	Utah Jynx	Playoff Round 2 Won 65-6
7/13/13	War Angels	vs	San Diego Surge	Playoff Round 3 Won 40-14
7/13/13	War Angels	vs	Dallas Diamonds	Playoff Round 4 Lost 6-27

** = Won by forfeit

== 2014 ==
=== Standings ===
2014 Pacific Region - Pacific West Division
	W	L	T	PCT	PF	PA	DIV	GB	STK
y-Las Vegas Showgirlz	6	2	0	0.750	256	115	2-1	---	
Central Cal War Angels	5	2	0	0.714	186	135	2-0	---	
Nevada Storm	0	6	0	0.000	14	180	0-3	---	

'''y''' = Clinched Division Title

=== Season schedule ===
2014	Schedule	Home/Away	Opponent	Result
4/5/14	War Angels	vs	Nevada Storm	Won 46-0
4/12/14	War Angels	@	Las Vegas Showgirlz	Won 32-28
4/19/14	War Angels	vs	West Coast Lightning	Won 60-8
	War Angels	@	Non-League Opponent	Won 1-0**
5/10/14	War Angels	vs	West Coast Lightning	Won 40-0
5/17/14	War Angels	@	San Diego Surge	Lost 0-64
6/7/14	War Angels	vs	San Diego Surge	Lost 35-6
6/15/14	War Angels	vs	Portland Fighting Fillies	Playoff Round 1 Won 44-0
6/22/14	War Angels	vs	Seattle Majestics	Playoff Round 2 lost 12-13

** = Won by forfeit

== 2015 ==
=== Standings ===
2015 Pacific Region - Pacific West Division
	W	L	T	PCT	PF	PA	DIV	GB	STK
y-San Diego Surge	7	1	0	0.875	412	112	7-1	--	--
Pacific Warriors	6	2	0	0.750	374	163	6-2	--	1
Central Cal War Angels	5	2	0	0.714	333	136	5-2	--	2
Sin City Sun Devils	4	4	0	0.500	142	220	3-3	--	1

'''y''' = Clinched Division Title

=== Season schedule ===
2015	Schedule	Home/Away	Opponent	Result
4/11/15	War Angels	vs	West Coast Lightning	Won 69-0
4/25/15	War Angels	vs	Ventura County Wolfpack	Won 75-0
5/2/15	War Angels	vs	Sin City Sun Devils	Won 46-6
5/9/15	War Angels	@	San Diego Surge	Loss 26-66
5/30/15	War Angels	@	Pacific Warriors	Loss 34-38
6/6/15	War Angels	@	Sin City Sun Devils	Won 59-12
6/13/15	War Angels	vs	San Diego Surge	Won 23-14
6/27/15	War Angels	@	San Diego Surge	Playoff Round 1 Loss 7-27
8/8/15	War Angels	vs	Atlanta Phoenix	National Alliance Bowl Won 28-8

** = Won by forfeit

== 2016 ==
=== Standings ===
2016 Pacific Region - Pacific South Division standings
	W	L	T	PCT	PF	PA	DIV	GB	STK
y-Central Cal War Angels	8	00	00	1.000	439	26	7-0	--	7
Pacific Warriors	5	2	00	0.714	297	133	5-2	--	
Sin City Trojans	4	4	00	0.500	222	168	3-4	--	1
West Coast Lightning	3	5	00	0.375	142	330	2-5	--	1
Ventura County Wolfpack	0	8	00	0.000	18	405	0-6	--	

'''y''' = Clinched Division Title

=== Season schedule ===
2016	Schedule	Home/Away	Opponent	Result
4/2/16	War Angels	vs	West Coast Lightning	Won 76-0
4/9/16	War Angels	@	Pacific Warriors	Won 37-14
4/23/16	War Angels	@	Ventura County Wolfpack	won 82-0
4/30/16	War Angels	vs	Sin City Trojans	Won 58-6
5/14/16	War Angels	@	Sin City Trojans	Won 44-0
5/21/16	War Angels	@	West Coast Lightning	Won 84-0
6/4/16	War Angels	vs	Pacific Warriors	Won 58-6
6/11/16	War Angels	--	-----------------------------------	Playoff Round 1 Bye
6/25/16	War Angels	vs	Pacific Warriors	Playoff Round 2 Won 46-14
7/9/16	War Angels	@	Dallas Elite	Playoff Round 3 Lost 34-28

** = Won by forfeit
