= Los Angeles Amazons =

American women's football team

- Founded: 2002
- League: Independent Women's Football League
- Team history: WPFL (2002-2007); NWFA (2008); IWFL (2009-2010); WFA (2011-2012)
- Based in: Los Angeles, California
- Stadium: Miguel Contreras Learning Complex
- Colors: Garnet, Gold
- Owner: Aubrey Duncan
- Head coach: Aubrey Duncan
- Championships: 0
- Mascot: Amazon Woman

The Los Angeles Amazons were a women's semi-professional American football team based in Los Angeles, California. They are member of the Women's Football Alliance and play their home games at Miguel Contreras Learning Complex.

The Amazons previously played in the Women's Professional Football League from their inception in 2000 until 2007, the National Women's Football Association in 2008, and the Independent Women's Football League in 2009 and 2010.

== Season-By-Season ==
Season records
Season	W	L	T	Finish	Playoff results
Los Angeles Amazons (WPFL)
2002	1	8	0	5th American	--
2003	2	8	0	5th American West	--
2004	4	6	0	3rd American West	--
2005	7	3	0	2nd American West	Lost American Conference Semifinal (So Cal)
2006	4	4	0	3rd American West	--
2007	7	1	0	1st American West	Lost American Conference Semifinal (So Cal)
Los Angeles Amazons (NWFA)
2008	8	0	0	1st South West	Won Southern Conference Semifinal (Kentucky); Lost Southern Conference Championship (H-Town)
Los Angeles Amazons (IWFL)
2009	8	0	0	1st Tier I West Pacific Southwest	Lost Western Conference Semifinal (Kansas City)
2010	4	4	0	5th Tier I West Pacific West	--
Los Angeles Amazons (WFA)
2011	1	7	0	3rd American North Pacific	--
2012	0	8	0	3rd American Division 15	--
Totals	47	53	0	(including playoffs)	

== 2009 ==
=== Season schedule ===
Date	Opponent	Home/Away	Result
April 11	California Quake	Away	Won 32-2
April 25	Southern California Breakers	Away	Won 42-0
May 2	California Quake	Home	Won 36-21
May 9	Modesto Maniax	Home	Won 64-0
May 16	New Mexico Menace	Home	Won 50-0
May 23	Southern California Breakers	Home	Won 33-0
May 30	Tucson Monsoon	Away	Won 57-0
June 13	Sacramento Sirens	Away	Won 20-19
June 27	Kansas City Tribe (Western Conference Semifinal)	Away	Lost 14-19

== 2010 ==
=== Season schedule ===
Date	Opponent	Home/Away	Result
April 3	So Cal Scorpions	Away	Won 37-26
April 17	California Quake	Away	Won 48-36
April 24	Sacramento Sirens	Home	Lost 26-27
May 8	Portland Shockwave	Away	Won 17-0
May 15	Bay Area Bandits	Home	Lost 22-33
May 22	Sacramento Sirens	Away	Lost 6-10
May 29	Portland Shockwave	Home	Lost 6-20
June 5	Southern California Breakers	Home	Won 39-14

== 2011 ==
=== Standings ===
2011 North Pacific Division
	W	L	T	PCT	PF	PA	DIV	GB	STK
y-Bay Area Bandits	7	3	0	0.750	223	72	4-1	---	L1
Central Cal War Angels	6	2	0	0.750	232	53	3-2	---	W4
Los Angeles Amazons	1	7	0	0.125	6	263	0-4	5.5	W1

'''y''' = Clinched Division Title

=== Season schedule ===
Date	Opponent	Home/Away	Result
April 2	Bay Area Bandits	Home	Lost 0-53
April 16	San Diego Surge	Home	Lost 0-74
April 30	Las Vegas Showgirlz	Away	Lost 0-16
May 7	Central Cal War Angels	Home	Lost 0-1**
May 21	Central Cal War Angels	Away	Lost 0-68
June 4	Las Vegas Showgirlz	Home	Lost 0-1**
June 11	Bay Area Bandits	Away	Lost 0-40
June 18	So Cal Scorpions	Away	Won 1-0***

** = Forfeited *** = Won by forfeit

== 2012 ==
=== Season schedule ===
Date	Opponent	Home/Away	Result
April 14	Central Cal War Angels	Home	Lost 46-0
April 21	Las Vegas Showgirlz	Away	Lost 48-0
April 28	San Diego Sting	Away	Lost 8-0
May 12	San Diego Sting	Home	Lost 14-0
May 19	Utah Jynx	Home	Lost 62-22
June 2	Las Vegas Showgirlz	Home	Lost 20-6
June 9	San Diego Sting	Away	Lost 7-0
June 16	Valley Vipers	Away	Lost 12-6
