= Las Vegas Showgirlz =

Former team in the Women's Football Alliance

- Founded: 2006
- Folded: 2017
- League: Women's Football Alliance
- Team history: WPFL (2006-2007); IWFL (2008); WFA (2009-2014)
- Based in: Summerlin, Nevada
- Stadium: Faith Lutheran Jr/Sr High School
- Colors: Purple, Silver
- President: O.B. Johnson
- Head coach: Dion A. Lee
- Championships: 0

The Las Vegas Showgirlz were a team in the Women's Football Alliance. Based in Summerlin, Nevada, the Showgirlz played their home games on the campus of Faith Lutheran Jr/Sr High School in the city's upscale Summerlin district.

Before joining the WFA, the Showgirlz played two seasons in the Women's Professional Football League and one in the Independent Women's Football League.

== Season-By-Season ==
Season records
Season	W	L	T	Finish	Playoff results
Las Vegas Showgirlz (WPFL)
2006	2	5	0	4th American West	--
2007	2	6	0	4th American West	--
Las Vegas Showgirlz (IWFL)
2008	5	3	0	2nd Pacific Southwest	--
Las Vegas Showgirlz (WFA)
2009	8	1	0	1st American Pacific	Lost American Conference Semifinal (St. Louis)
2010	10	2	0	T-1st American South Pacific	Won American Conference Quarterfinal (Portland); Won American Conference Semifinal (Austin); Lost American Conference Championship (Lone Star)
2011	4	6	0	3rd American South Pacific	--
2012*	--	--	--	--	--
Totals	31	23	0	(including playoffs)	

== 2009 ==
=== Season schedule ===
Date	Opponent	Home/Away	Result
April 18	California Lynx	Home	Won 19-6
May 9	Marana She Devils	Away	Won 6-0**
May 23	Phoenix Prowlers	Away	Won 26-14
May 30	Phoenix Prowlers	Home	Won 47-8
June 6	Marana She Devils	Home	Won 6-0**
June 13	California Lynx	Home	Won 28-20
June 20	Phoenix Prowlers	Away	Won 35-8
June 27	California Lynx	Away	Won 40-22
July 11	St. Louis Slam (American Conference Semifinal)	Away	Lost 12-30

== 2010 ==
=== Season schedule ===
Date	Opponent	Home/Away	Result
April 10	Utah Blitz	Away	Won 27-0
April 17	Arizona Assassins	Away	Won 26-6
May 1	Utah Blitz	Home	Won 41-0
May 8	Pacific Warriors	Home	Won 34-6
May 15	Arizona Assassins	Home	Won 48-8
May 22	Utah Blitz	Away	Won 55-0
June 5	Portland Fighting Fillies	Home	Won 17-6
June 12	Pacific Warriors	Away	Lost 21-33
June 19	Arizona Assassins	Home	Won 31-0
June 26	Portland Fighting Fillies (American Conference Quarterfinal)	Home	Won 34-6
July 10	Austin Outlaws (American Conference Semifinal)	Away	Won 27-21
July 17	Lone Star Mustangs (American Conference Championship)	Home	Lost 6-8

== 2011 ==
=== Standings ===
2011 South Pacific Division
	W	L	T	PCT	PF	PA	DIV	GB	STK
y-San Diego Surge	8	0	0	1.000	483	54	4-0	---	W8
Pacific Warriors	4	4	0	0.500	173	193	2-2	4.0	L3
Las Vegas Showgirlz	3	5	0	0.375	48	251	0-4	5.0	L1

=== Season schedule ===
Date	Opponent	Home/Away	Result
March 26	Utah Jynx*	Home	Won 12-8
April 9	San Diego Surge	Away	Lost 0-84
April 16	Pacific Warriors	Home	Lost 0-36
April 30	Los Angeles Amazons	Home	Won 16-0
May 7	Pacific Warriors	Away	Lost 6-56
May 14	Utah Blitz	Away	Won 14-0
May 21	San Diego Surge	Home	Lost 0-55
May 28	Utah Jynx*	Away	Lost 22-43
June 4	Los Angeles Amazons	Away	Won 6-0**
June 11	San Diego Sting	Home	Lost 6-20

* = Exhibition ** = Won by forfeit

== 2012 ==
=== Season schedule ===
Date	Opponent	Home/Away	Result
March 10	Phoenix Phantomz (IWFL)*	Home	
March 17	Ventura Black Widows (WSFL)*	Home	
March 17	Salt City Arch Angels (WSFL)*	Home	
March 17	Nevada Storm (WSFL)*	Home	
March 24	Phoenix Phantomz (IWFL)*	Home	
March 31	Interleague (TBA)*	Home	
April 14	Arizona Assassins	Home	
April 21	Los Angeles Amazons	Home	
April 28	Utah Blitz	Away	
May 5	San Diego Sting	Away	
May 12	Utah Jynx	Away	
May 19	Silver State Legacy	Home	
June 2	Los Angeles Amazons	Away	
June 16	San Diego Sting	Home	
