= So Cal Scorpions =

Women's American football team

- Founded: 2003
- Folded: 2011
- League: Independent Women's Football League
- Team history: WPFL (2003–2007); IWFL (2010); WFA (2011)
- Based in: San Diego, California
- Stadium: Balboa Stadium
- Colors: Gold, Blue, White
- Owner: Ann Bagala Paterno
- Head coach: Dan Tovar
- Championships: 1 (2007 WPFL)

The So Cal Scorpions were a semi-pro women's American football team based in San Diego, California, that competed in the Women's Football Alliance. The Scorpions also played in the Independent Women's Football League and the Women's Professional Football League. The team played its home games at Balboa Stadium.

== History ==
In 2003 the So Cal Scorpions began their inaugural season in the city of Temecula, in Riverside County, Ann Bagala Paterno as the CEO of the first professional sports team in this city and county. They moved to San Diego in 2004.

In 2007, the SoCal Scorpions unveiled a new spread, no huddle offense similar to the one run by several Division I Colleges under rookie head coach Dan Tovar. The So Cal Scorpions won the WPFL National Championship in 2007 largely behind this new pro style offense and the return of their already stellar defense. The Scorpions entered the playoffs as the final seed in their division after compiling a 6–2 record. Two of their six victories were over the three-time defending champion Dallas Diamonds who had previously only lost one game in a four-year span. Those two wins kept the defending champs from even entering the playoffs. The Scorpions were true road warriors, going undefeated on the road in the regular season, and traveled to Los Angeles and New York for their playoff victories.

En route to their Championship, several Scorpion players shattered league records. QB Melissa Gallegos threw for over 1,700 yards and 20 touchdowns, she also ran for over 100 yards and 4 rushing touchdowns. Rookie sensation Brittney Cotton led the WR corps with almost 700 yards receiving joining Scorpion veterans Isis Wagner, Elizabeth Quintard and Theresa Smith on the WPFL All Pro Team. RB Felicia (Reesey) Reese rushed for over 1,600 yards and 12 touchdowns and was the winner of the League MVP award. She scored the first touchdown in SoCal's 14–7 Championship victory over the Houston Energy.

The offense was anchored on the O-Line by ALL Stars Katrina Walter, Lela Vaeao, Lindsay Hood, Christina Carrillo, and first year left guard Hawa Wiley-Ross. This unit gave up less than 10 sacks on the season for an offense that threw the ball 60% of the time. Defensively, the Scorpions were led by Deuce Reyes who recorded 17 INT's on the season and by Defensive Ends Cilena Mosley and Crystal Stokes who together recorded over 24 sacks on the season. Defensive Tackle Michelle Starks earned her first All Pro spot joining veteran Joniece Edwards. Team Captain Andrea Hubbard made the switch from Defensive End to Linebacker and earned an All-Pro bid along with first time All-Pros, Tarrah Philpott and Wendy Hanlon. Priscilla Flores and Kalilah Lawson rounded out So Cal's record 22 players on the All Pro team.

The Championship So Cal Scorpions were also represented when ESPN Commentator/Author Rick Reilly visited the team and featured them in his book Sports From Hell.

In their first season in the IWFL in 2010, the Scorpions finished 6–2, good enough for another playoff berth. However, for the first time in their history they finished the postseason "one-and-done," losing to the Sacramento Sirens 60–26.

For their inaugural season in the WFA, the Scorpions won only two games (both against intra-city rivals the San Diego Sting). However, the Scorpions folded mid-season, with their final official record being 2–6.

== Season-By-Season ==
Season records
Season	W	L	T	Finish	Playoff results
So Cal Scorpions (WPFL)
2003	4	6	0	4th American West	–
2004	1	9	0	4th American West	–
2005	9	1	0	1st American West	Won American Conference Semifinal (Los Angeles); Lost American Conference Championship (Dallas)
2006	6	2	0	2nd American West	Won American Conference Semifinal (New England); Lost American Conference Championship (Dallas)
2007	6	2	0	2nd American West	Won American Conference Semifinal (Los Angeles); Won American Conference Championship (Empire State); Won WPFL Championship (Houston)
2008	Did not play				
2009	Did not play				
So Cal Scorpions (IWFL)
2010	6	2	0	2nd Tier I West Pacific West	Lost Pacific West Division Championship (Sacramento)
So Cal Scorpions (WFA)
2011	2	6	0	3rd American Southwest	–
Totals	39	31	0	(including playoffs)	

== Roster ==
So Cal Scorpions roster
Quarterbacks: 4 Dawn Crim; 7 Ashley Grant; 23 Marisa Renteria; Running backs: Reese (Reesey Cup) Danger *13; Wide receivers: currently vacant	Offensive line: currently vacant; Defensive line: currently vacant; Linebackers: currently vacant	Defensive backs: currently vacant; Special teams: currently vacant; Multiple Positions: 3 Whitney Westman (QB/DB); 10 Rebekah Hash (RB/DB); 12 Leizel Taylor (DB/WR); 13 Felicia Reese (RB/DB); 14 Gabrielle Reynoso (SS/RB); 15 Natasha Saulo (RB/DL); 16 Elizabeth Salazar (DB/WR); 17 Shawnna Joyner (WR/DB); 18 Tawny Jolly (H/LB); 20 Jazmin Sveum (LB/RB); 21 Apple Gomez (RB/LB); 22 Sonfre' Roberson (DB/WR); 24 Melissa Torrence (RB/DB); 25 Crystal Bridges (DB/WR); 26 Danielle Daniels (WR/DB); 27 Mona Lisa Thomas (DB/RB); 28 Latefah Waller (RB/LB); 29 Amy Sandoval (H/LB); 32 Danielle Bush (RB/DB); 33 Paige De Guzman (H/LB); 34 Anna Kharlamova (WR/DB); 36 Natalie Gorman (RB/LB); 38 Eva Austria (H/LB); 43 Rachael Parkison (SS/WR); 44 Alexa DeJerez (WR/FS); 47 Dailene Germann (DB/RB); 48 Leigha Scott (H/DL); 52 Randi Hansen (OL/DL); 53 Veronica Hatcher (OL/DT); 54 Jackie Sessoms (OL/DL); 55 Aishama Franklin (OL/DL); 61 Sandra Adames (DB/WR); 63 Christina Medina (DL/OL); 64 Kelly Gary (DL/OL); 65 Jody Taylor (DL/OL); 66 Juanita Burney (C/DT); 68 Rebekah LaMie (OL/DL); 74 Patricia Hogue (OL/DL); 76 Ahna Glenn (DT/OL); 78 Mary Garcia (OL/DL); 80 Tiffany Tomlin (WR/DB); 83 Trish Nunez (WR/DB); 91 Shanae Ruffin (DL/OL); 94 Lynette Perkins (OL/DL); 99 Tiliza Kuumba (DL/OL)	Injured reserve: currently vacant; Exempt List: currently vacant; Practice squad: currently vacant; rookies in italics; Roster updated May 2, 2011; 47 Active, 0 Inactive, 0 PS

== 2010 ==
=== Season Schedule 2007 ===
Date	Opponent	Home/Away	Result
April 3	Los Angeles Amazons	Home	Lost 26–37
April 10	Southern California Breakers	Away	Won 22–0
April 17	Tucson Monsoon	Home	Won 54–0
April 24	California Quake	Away	Lost 40–42
May 8	Seattle Majestics	Home	Won 41–14
May 22	Tucson Monsoon	Away	Won 41–0
May 29	Bay Area Bandits	Home	Won 43–6
June 5	Bay Area Bandits	Away	Won 26–22
June 12	Sacramento Sirens (Pacific West Division Championship)	Away	Lost 26–60

=== Season Schedule 2010 ===
Date	Opponent	Home/Away	Result
April 3	Los Angeles Amazons	Home	Lost 26–37
April 10	Southern California Breakers	Away	Won 22–0
April 17	Tucson Monsoon	Home	Won 54–0
April 24	California Quake	Away	Lost 40–42
May 8	Seattle Majestics	Home	Won 41–14
May 22	Tucson Monsoon	Away	Won 41–0
May 29	Bay Area Bandits	Home	Won 43–6
June 5	Bay Area Bandits	Away	Won 26–22
June 12	Sacramento Sirens (Pacific West Division Championship)	Away	Lost 26–60

== 2011 ==
=== Standings ===
2011 Southwest Division
	W	L	T	PCT	PF	PA	DIV	GB	STK
y-Silver State Legacy	6	2	0	0.750	199	79	5-1	---	W3
Arizona Assassins	6	2	0	0.750	207	103	5-1	---	W1
So Cal Scorpions	2	6	0	0.250	37	111	2-4	4.0	L4
San Diego Sting	1	7	0	0.125	38	239	0-6	5.0	W1

=== Season schedule ===
Date	Opponent	Home/Away	Result
April 2	San Diego Sting	Away	Won 16–0
April 16	Arizona Assassins	Home	Lost 0–39
April 30	Silver State Legacy	Away	Lost 3–27
May 7	San Diego Sting	Home	Won 12–6
May 14	Pacific Warriors	Away	Lost 6–21
May 21	Arizona Assassins	Away	Lost 0–6**
June 4	Silver State Legacy	Home	Lost 0–6**
June 18	Los Angeles Amazons	Home	Lost 0–6**

** = Forfeited
