= Silver State Legacy =

- Founded: 2010
- Folded: 2013
- League: Women's Football Alliance
- Team history: Silver State Legacy (2011-2013)
- Based in: North Las Vegas, Nevada
- Stadium: Legacy High School.
- Colors: Blue, Texas orange, silver
- Head coach: Tony Scarlett
- Championships: 0

The Silver State Legacy was a team of the Women's Football Alliance that began play in 2011. Based in North Las Vegas, Nevada, United States, the Legacy played its home games at Legacy High School.

The Legacy was one of two WFA teams in Las Vegas, the other being the Las Vegas Showgirlz.

== Season-by-season ==
Season records
Season	W	L	T	Finish	Playoff results
2011	6	2	0	1st American Southwest	Lost American Conference Quarterfinal (San Diego)
2012	2	2	0	3rd WFA American 17	--
Totals	8	4	0	(including playoffs)	

== 2011 Roster ==
Silver State Legacy roster
Quarterbacks: 9 Kerry Mytych; Running backs: 32 Christina Brouchet; 35 Octavia Wayman; Wide receivers: 10 Karin Joot; 17 Jodie Cannon; 81 Erin Navin	Offensive line: 64 Shannon Scarlett; 66 Mona Montgomery (C); Defensive line: 12 Vanessa Hernandez (DT); 20 Charley Cox (DE); 23 Lenora Clinkscales (DE); 59 Shamika Brownlee; Linebackers: 40 Christi Acacio; 50 Lupe Trejo; 51 Jenei Estrada; 55 Megan Clark	Defensive backs: 22 Joy Norman (SS); Special teams: currently vacant; Multiple Positions: 2 Maria Palacios-Rodriguez (DB/RB); 3 Shameka Finks (RB/LB); 5 Nikki Johnson (RB/QB); 7 Tricia Nishikawa (K/DB); 11 Alicia Ramos (LB/QB); 15 Alana Dixon (DB/WR); 16 Stephanie Gemar (WR/DB); 21 Stephanie Maldonado (DB/RB); 44 Emily Velasquez (TE/DT); 52 Rocky Grayson (OL/DL); 57 Katrina Cunningham (OL/DL); 63 Cynthia Forrest (OL/DL); 69 Chelo Estrada (OL/DL); 86 Kiki Morris (OL/DL/TE); 97 Sharisse Olsen (OL/DL); 99 Ronne Page (OL/DL)	Injured reserve: currently vacant; Exempt List: currently vacant; Practice squad: currently vacant; rookies in italics; Roster updated May 2, 2011; 33 Active, 0 Inactive, 0 PS

== 2011 ==
=== Standings ===
2011 Southwest Division
	W	L	T	PCT	PF	PA	DIV	GB	STK
y-Silver State Legacy	6	2	0	0.750	199	79	5-1	---	W3
Arizona Assassins	6	2	0	0.750	207	103	5-1	---	W1
So Cal Scorpions	2	6	0	0.250	37	111	2-4	4.0	L4
San Diego Sting	1	7	0	0.125	38	239	0-6	5.0	W1

=== Season schedule ===
Date	Opponent	Home/Away	Result
April 9	Arizona Assassins	Away	Lost 8-21
April 16	San Diego Sting	Away	Won 42-0
April 30	So Cal Scorpions	Home	Won 27-3
May 7	Utah Blitz	Home	Won 44-0
May 14	San Diego Surge	Away	Lost 15-48
May 21	San Diego Sting	Home	Won 35-0
June 4	So Cal Scorpions	Away	Won 6-0**
June 11	Arizona Assassins	Home	Won 22-7
June 25	San Diego Surge (American Conference Quarterfinal)	Away	Lost 7-41

** = Won by forfeit

== 2012 ==
=== Season schedule ===
Date	Opponent	Home/Away	Result
April 14	Utah Blitz	Home	
April 21	San Diego Surge	Away	
April 28	Pacific Warriors	Home	
May 5	Arizona Assassins	Home	
May 19	Las Vegas Showgirlz	Away	
June 2	San Diego Surge	Home	
June 9	Pacific Warriors	Away	
June 16	Arizona Assassins	Away	
