= American Football Women's League =

The American Football Women's League (AFWL) is a defunct league that had eight teams.

It debuted on May 15, 2002, was one of the first women's football leagues formed, originally using the name WAFL, or Women's American Football League in 2001. The AFWL officially disbanded in March 2003, due to money and attendance problems.

== AFWL teams ==
- Arizona Titans
- Long Beach Aftershock
- Los Angeles Lasers
- Sacramento Gold Rush
- San Diego Sunfire
- San Francisco Tsunami

== AFWL Championships ==
Year	Champion	Score	Runner-up
2001	California Quake	30-14	Jacksonville Dixie Blues
2002	Long Beach Aftershock	12-7	San Diego Sunfire

== See also ==
- Women's Professional Football League (WPFL)
- Women's football in the United States
- List of leagues of American football
