= Bay Area Bandits =

- Founded: 2010
- League: IWFL (2010); WFA (2011-2012)
- Team history: Bay Area Bandits (2010-2012)
- Based in: Fremont, California
- Stadium: Contra Costa College
- Colors: Green, black, gray
- Head coach: Danielle Golay
- Championships: 0
- Website: http://www.bayareabandits.com/

The Bay Area Bandits was a women's American football team that played from 2010 to 2012. Based in Fremont, California, the Bandits played their home games at Contra Costa College.

The Bandits switched to the Women's Football Alliance in 2011 after participating in the Independent Women's Football League in their debut season in 2010.

== Season-by-season ==
Season records
Season	W	L	T	Finish	Playoff results
Bay Area Bandits (IWFL2)
2010	7	4	0	1st IWFL2 Western Pacific West	Won Western Conference Semifinal (Modesto); Won Western Conference Championship (Wisconsin); Lost IWFL2 National Championship (Montreal)
Bay Area Bandits (WFA)
2011	7	3	0	1st American North Pacific	Won American Conference Quarterfinal (Portland); Lost American Conference Semifinal (San Diego)
2012	8	2	0	1st American North Pacific	Won American Conference Quarterfinal (Central Cal); Lost American Conference Semifinal (San Diego)
Totals	22	9	0	(including playoffs)	

== 2010 ==
=== Season schedule ===
Date	Opponent	Home/Away	Result
April 3	Sacramento Sirens	Away	Lost 13-33
April 10	Portland Shockwave	Home	Won 13-0
April 17	Southern California Breakers	Away	Won 42-7
May 1	Southern California Breakers	Home	Won 26-6
May 15	Los Angeles Amazons	Away	Won 33-22
May 22	Modesto Maniax	Home	Won 47-8
May 29	So Cal Scorpions	Away	Lost 6-46
June 5	So Cal Scorpions	Home	Lost 22-26
June 12	Modesto Maniax (Tier II Pacific West Division Championship)	Home	Won 46-0
July 10	Wisconsin Warriors (Tier II Western Conference Championship)	Home	Won 46-0
July 24	Montreal Blitz (Tier II North American Championship)	Neutral (Round Rock, TX)	Lost 2-9

== 2011 ==
=== Standings ===
2011 North Pacific Division
	W	L	T	PCT	PF	PA	DIV	GB	STK
y-Bay Area Bandits	7	3	0	0.750	223	72	4-1	---	L1
Central Cal War Angels	6	2	0	0.750	232	53	3-2	---	W4
Los Angeles Amazons	1	7	0	0.125	6	263	0-4	5.5	W1

'''y''' = Clinched Division Title

=== Season schedule ===
Date	Opponent	Home/Away	Result
April 2	Los Angeles Amazons	Away	Won 54-0
April 9	Portland Fighting Fillies	Home	Won 36-0
April 30	Central Cal War Angels	Away	Won 11-6
May 7	Portland Fighting Fillies	Away	Won 36-0
May 14	Central Cal War Angels	Home	Won 19-0
June 4	San Diego Surge	Home	Lost 13-42
June 11	Los Angeles Amazons	Home	Won 30-0
June 18	Central Cal War Angels	Away	Lost 15-24
June 25	Portland Fighting Fillies (American Conference Quarterfinal)	Home	Won 39-0
July 9	San Diego Surge (American Conference Semifinal)	Away	Lost 0-36

== 2012 ==
=== Season schedule ===
Date	Opponent	Home/Away	Result
April 14	Portland Fighting Fillies	Home	
April 21	West Coast Lightning	Away	
April 28	Valley Vipers	Home	
May 12	Central Cal War Angels	Home	
May 19	San Diego Surge	Away	
June 2	West Coast Lightning	Home	
June 9	Valley Vipers	Away	
June 16	Central Cal War Angels	Away	
