= Spokane Scorn =

Women's football team

- Founded: 2010
- League: Women's Football Alliance
- Team history: Spokane Scorn (2011-future)
- Based in: Spokane, Washington
- Stadium: Valley Christian School
- Colors: Royal blue, black, white
- Owner: Team-owned
- Head coach: Jim Puryear
- Championships: 0

The Spokane Scorn was a team of the Women's Football Alliance based in Spokane, Washington, U.S., which began its inaugural season in 2011. The team played 11-'man' football, full contact, full pads. Its home stadium was Valley Christian School in Spokane Valley.

== Season-by-season ==
Season records
Season	W	L	T	Finish	Playoff results
2011	1	7	0	3rd Northwest	--
