= WomenSports =

American periodical

womenSports
- April 1976 cover of womenSports with Olga Korbut
- Editor-in-Chief: Rosalie Muller Wright (1974–1975); Cheryl McCall; Cutler Durkee
- Categories: Women's magazine
- Frequency: Monthly
- Publisher: womenSports Publishing Company (1974–1978); Women's Sports Foundation (1979–1998); Condé Nast Publications (1998–2000)
- First issue: May 1974
- Country: USA
- Language: English

womenSports magazine was the first magazine dedicated to women in sports. It was launched in close conjunction with Billie Jean King's Women's Sports Foundation and each issue of the magazine contained a two-page article written by the executive director of the Foundation. It was started soon after Billie Jean's win at the Battle of the Sexes.

== History ==
=== The Launch of womenSports ===
Billie Jean King established herself as an extremely talented tennis player very early on in her career. Despite all of the success that she had on the court, however, Billie Jean King still did not feel as though she was given the respect and attention that she, and all other female athletes, deserved. Her feelings on the issue of misrepresentation in the media were heightened when she noticed how much Sports Illustrated had a lack of coverage for women athletes. Taking matters into her own hands, Billie Jean King decided to launch her own magazine, which became known as womenSports, in order to give women athletes a feeling of pride through the proper coverage, attention, and respect that they deserve.

The launch of womenSports did not see major success right away; in fact, the first issue of the magazine received great backlash, for it seemed to just focus on Billie Jean King herself, rather than other women in the sports world. In order to fix the problem, Billie Jean King and her publishers had to make sure that they were covering different athletes in every new edition of the magazine. Because womenSports focused on profiles and features of new female athletes in each edition, it was seen to never be able to compete with a magazine, such as Sports Illustrated, which sent out weekly updates of what was going on in the world of sports. Although it was not seen to be competing with Sports Illustrated, womenSports found great success because, even though it had close ties with tennis due to Billie Jean King, it covered all major sports played by women in the United States.

=== womenSports ===
Billie Jean and Larry King acted as publishers, while Jim Jorgensen was the company president. Rosalie Wright from Philadelphia magazine was hired as the magazine's editor-in-chief and brought on writers Anne Lamott, Jon Carroll and Greg Hoffman. During its design and launch phase, womenSports received help from Ms. Magazine publishers Pat Carbine and Gloria Steinem as well as celebrity PR executive Pat Kingsley.

The inaugural issue of womenSports (ISSN 0095-0661)in May 1974 featured Billie Jean King on the cover. Shortly after launch, womenSports reached a monthly circulation of 200,000. womenSports won a J.C. Penney-Missouri Award in 1974. (The J.C. Penney-Missouri Awards became the Missouri Lifestyle Journalism Awards in 1994.)

Turnover began in 1975 when editor Wright was fired for refusing to print an article written by an advertiser and not marked as such. She was replaced by Cheryl McCall from the Detroit Free Press. womenSports was sold to the Charter Company, then owner of Redbook, in 1976 and the company's offices were moved to New York from San Francisco. Then-editor McCall stayed with the magazine, but soon left to become an editor at People magazine. Cutler Durkee moved with the magazine to New York City, then from womenSports to People where he became its executive editor.

=== Women's Sports and Fitness ===
After Charter ceased publication of womenSports, the Kings reclaimed ownership of the magazine and began publishing it through the Women's Sports Foundation as Women's Sports (ISSN 0163-7428), publishing it monthly from 1979 through 1984. In 1984 the magazine moved to bimonthly publication and subsequently changed its name to Women's Sports and Fitness (ISSN 8750-653X).

=== Condé Nast Women's Sports and Fitness ===
Condé Nast Publications acquired Women's Sports + Fitness in 1998 and rolled its monthly Condé Nast Sports for Women into it to form bimonthly magazine titled Condé Nast Women's Sports and Fitness (ISSN 1099-6079). The magazine continued under that tile through 2000, when Condé Nast closed the magazine. It was folded into Self in late 2000.

== Inside womenSports ==
=== Content ===
Billie Jean’s womenSports intended to be a magazine that all women could be proud of. Although the first issue showcased the tennis star a great deal, the editors of the magazine found it difficult to cover women’s sports without including Billie Jean King. Aside from this obstacle, womenSports was seen as a traditional magazine that showcased articles and features dedicated to women in sports. Because the magazine was more traditional, it was not seen as a feminist magazine despite the fact that womenSports had a demographic consisting of 98 percent women. Rather than producing coverage of sporting events, womenSports incorporated self-help articles and profile features of women athletes, highlighting their successes. The magazine focused on a wide range of sports played by women which consist of volleyball, soccer, basketball, softball, field hockey and surfing. With the influence of Billie Jean King, womenSports created its own “womanSport of the year,” similar to Sports Illustrated’s Sportswoman of the Year. WomenSports also gave its readers a history lesson by emphasizing historic female athletes of our time and providing information on which schools offered scholarships to women. Billie Jean King’s vision for womenSports was to create a personable female magazine; to enhance these characteristics, she was very open to critiques and comments from readers.

=== Women Featured ===
The magazine womenSports included profiles of many pioneering women athletes in history that were pushing for change even before Billie Jean King was born. Women that were featured included golfer Glenna Colette Vare and tennis player Hazel Wightman. Both of these women, including many others, were featured in womenSports because of the impact they made for female athletes throughout the world of sports during the time that they were playing.

Glenna Colette Vare was the greatest female golfer of her time. Throughout her career, Glenna Colette Vare won six U.S. Women’s Amateur Championships, two Canadian Women’s Amateurs and a French Amateur during a time where there was no Ladies Professional Golf Association Tour. With the success that Vare had in her career, she raised awareness around women’s golf – a sport that had no recognition at the time. In 1975, Vare was part of the first class inducted into the World Golf Hall of Fame due to the impact she made both on and off the course.

Hazel Wightman had one of the most distinguished careers in the history of tennis. Due to her consistent efforts on and off the court, Wightman separated herself from all her competition and made an everlasting impact on the sport. Throughout her career, Hazel Wightman won 16 titles at the U.S. National Championship, which included 3 consecutive years of her sweeping the singles, doubles, and mixed doubles. In addition to all of her wins, Wightman contributed to the game of tennis through her creation of the Wightman Cup; similar to the Davis Cup for men, the Wightman Cup was played annually between U.S. and Great Britain up until 1989 when it was disbanded. The creation of the Wightman Cup showed how much Hazel Wightman valued women equality in her sport and how she did everything she could in order to show that to the public.

Glenna Colette Vare and Hazel Wightman were just two of the many women that were featured in womenSports because of the great impact that they had during their time of playing their sport. The inclusion of these women in the magazine was so essential because it showed appreciation and honor towards women that pushed for equality and change during times that women were looked down upon and seen as unequal.
