= Women's Professional Football League =

Former women's American football league in the United States

- The WPFL logo
- Sport: American football
- Founded: 1999
- No. of teams: 1
- Country: United States
- Most recent champion: So Cal Scorpions

The Women's Professional American Football League (WPFL) was a women's professional American football league in the United States. With teams across the United States, the WPFL had its first game in 1999 with just two original teams: the Lake Michigan Minx and the Minnesota Vixens. Fifteen teams nationwide competed for the championship in 2006.

Unlike the other women's American football franchises, the WPFL operated as a fall league and not a spring league.

== History ==
In 1999 two businessmen, Carter Turner and Terry Sullivan, decided to research the feasibility of a professional women’s football league by gathering together top female athletes into two teams and playing an exhibition game in front of an audience. The game between the Lake Michigan Minx and the Minnesota Vixens at the Hubert H. Humphrey Metrodome in Minneapolis, Minnesota was a success and turned into a six-game exhibition tour across the country dubbed the “No Limits” Barnstorming Tour.

The success of the Barnstorming Tour led to the first official WPFL season in 2000 with 11 teams competing nationwide. This first season ended with some turmoil however; the regular season was shortened by several games, players were not given their promised $100 per-game salaries, and there were allegations regarding instability with some of the league's financial backers.

The WPFL rebounded the next year completing the 2001 season after several organizational changes. Notable changes included the departure of founders Sullivan and Turner (Turner then founded the WAFL; restructure of the league by several WPFL team owners: Melissa Korpacz - New England Storm, Robin Howington - Houston Energy, and Donna Roebuck and Dee Kennamer - Austin Rage; changes to player/team compensation; and the moving of the start of the season from fall to summer.

== Championships ==
Year	Champion	Score	Runner-up
1999	Lake Michigan Minx	30-27	Minnesota Vixen
2000	Houston Energy	39-7	New England Storm
2001	Houston Energy	47-14	Austin Rage
2002	Houston Energy	56-7	Wisconsin Riveters
2003	Northern Ice	53-12	Florida Stingrays
2004	Dallas Diamonds	68-13	Northern Ice
2005	Dallas Diamonds	61-8	New York Dazzles
2006	Dallas Diamonds	34-27	Houston Energy
2007	SoCal Scorpions	14-7	Houston Energy

== See also ==
- American football in the United States
- Women's football in the United States
- Independent Women's Football League (IWFL)
- National Women's Football Association
- Women's American Football League (WAFL)
- American Football Women's League (AFWL)
- List of leagues of American football
