= Pacific Warriors =

Women's football team in California, US

- Founded: 2010
- League: Women's Football Alliance
- Team history: Pacific Warriors (2010-2017)
- Based in: Hermosa Beach, California
- Stadium: Waller Stadium
- Colors: Red, black, and white
- Head coach: Kurt Hopkins - 2012
- Championships: 0
- Mascot: Warrior

The Los Angeles Warriors are a team of the Women's Football Alliance which began play for the 2010 season. Based in Los Angeles, California, the Warriors play their home games at Michelle and Barack Obama Sports Complex in Los Angeles, CA.

The Warriors are the only Los Angeles County-based team in the WFA.

== Season-by-season ==
Season records
Season	W	L	T	Finish	Playoff results
California Lynx (WFA)
2009	5	3	0	2nd American Pacific	--
Pacific Warriors (WFA)
2010	7	1	0	T-1st American South Pacific	Lost American Conference Quarterfinal (Lone Star)
2011	4	4	0	2nd American South Pacific	--
2012	3	1	0	1st WFA American 17	--
Totals	19	10	0	(including playoffs)	

== 2010 ==
=== Season schedule ===
Date	Opponent	Home/Away	Result
April 17	San Diego Sting	Home	Won 41-0
April 24	Central Cal War Angels	Home	Won 34-29
May 1	Arizona Assassins	Home	Won 34-26
May 8	Las Vegas Showgirlz	Away	Lost 6-34
May 15	San Diego Sting	Away	Won 6-0**
May 22	Arizona Assassins	Away	Won 20-8
June 5	Central Cal War Angels	Away	Won 41-18
June 12	Las Vegas Showgirlz	Home	Won 33-21
June 26	Lone Star Mustangs (American Conference Quarterfinal)	Away	Lost 14-38

** = Won by forfeit

== 2011 ==
=== Standings ===
2011 South Pacific Division
	W	L	T	PCT	PF	PA	DIV	GB	STK
y-San Diego Surge	8	0	0	1.000	483	54	4-0	---	W8
Pacific Warriors	4	4	0	0.500	173	193	2-2	4.0	L3
Las Vegas Showgirlz	3	5	0	0.375	48	251	0-4	5.0	L1

=== Season schedule ===
Date	Opponent	Home/Away	Result
April 9	San Diego Sting	Away	Won 40-0
April 16	Las Vegas Showgirlz	Away	Won 36-0
April 30	San Diego Surge	Away	Lost 0-82
May 7	Las Vegas Showgirlz	Home	Won 56-6
May 14	So Cal Scorpions	Home	Won 21-6
June 4	Central Cal War Angels	Home	Lost 8-30
June 11	San Diego Surge	Home	Lost 6-43
June 18	Arizona Assassins	Away	Lost 6-26

== 2012 ==
=== Season schedule ===
Date	Opponent	Home/Away	Result
April 14	San Diego Sting	Home	Won 48-0
April 21	Arizona Assassins	Away	Won 54-0
April 28	Silver State Legacy	Away	Won 22-14
May 5	San Diego Surge	Home	Lost 12-69
May 19	Central Cal War Angels	Away	Lost 12-30
June 2	Arizona Assassins	Home	Won 61-0
June 9	Silver State Legacy	Home	Won 27-7
June 16	San Diego Surge	Away	Lost 0-49
