= San Diego Surge =

Football team from California, US

- Founded: 2010
- Disbanded: 2019
- League: Women's Football Alliance
- Team history: San Diego Surge (2011–2019)
- Based in: Santee, California
- Stadium: Santana High School
- Colors: Navy blue, sky blue, white
- President: Christina Suggett
- Head coach: Mike Suggett
- Championships: 1

The San Diego Surge were a women's professional football team based in Santee, California, that competed in the Women's Football Alliance (WFA). The team played its home games at Santana High School and previously at Mira Mesa Senior High School. The Surge began play in the 2011 season. On September 10, 2019, the team ceased operations indefinitely.

In their first season, the Surge finished 8–0, winning their division, and won the American Conference championship over the Dallas Diamonds before losing to the Boston Militia in the WFA championship game.

The Surge won the 2012 WFA title by beating the Chicago Force in the championship game at Heinz Field.

== Season-by-season ==
Season	W	L	T	Finish	Playoff Results
2011	11	1	0	1st American South Pacific	Won American Conference Quarterfinal (Silver State) Won American Conference Semifinal (Bay Area) Won American Conference Champions (Dallas) Lost WFA National Championship (Boston)
2012	12	0	0	1st WFA American 17	Won American Conference Quarterfinal (Pacific) Won American Conference Semifinal (Bay Area) Won American Conference Champions (Dallas) Won WFA National Championship (Chicago)
2013	9	2	0	1st American South Pacific	
2014	11	1	0	1st WFA American	
2015	9	2	0	1st WFA Pacific Region	
2017	7	4	0	1st WFA Pacific Region	
2018	4	0	0	TBD	

* = current standing

== 2012 roster ==
San Diego Surge roster
Quarterbacks
- 3 Melissa Gallegos
- 7 Aisha Ruffo
- 8 Mauri Tafao

Running backs

- 12 Ashley Moody
- 18 Yaritza Perez
- 21 Deana Guidry
- 31 Leslie Hubbell

Receivers

- 5 Kaycee Clark
- 10 Holly Peterson
- 11 Jessica Javelet
- 15 Kelly Magnuson
- 45 Celina Graves
- 82 Brittany Cotton

Offensive line
- 50 Jennifer White
- 53 Courtney Vasques
- 54 Christina Carrillo
- 55 Katrina Walter
- 63 Jessica Cable

* 64    Kristi McKinney 

- 66 Yessica Palmer
- 69 Eboni Chambers
- 70 Regina Jaso
- 76 Lindsay Hood
- 77 Sabrina Wilson

Defensive line

- 49 Carol Van Natten (DE)
- 56 Jana Schroth (DE)
- 65 Renisha Gates
- 72 Michelle Starks
- 74 Stephanie Parker
- 92 Linda Arnaud
- 93 Crystal Stokes (DE)
- 96 Joniece Edwards
- 97 Nikki Quest (DE)
- 99 Elizabeth Floto

Linebackers

- 23 Crystal Elton
- 24 Kalilah Lawson
- 27 Chandra Thomson
- 38 Cilena Mosley
- 41 Traci Alexander
- 42 Aleeza Goggins
- 44 Samantha White
- 58 Shinobu Williams
- 59 Amy Deal
- 68 Elizabeth Garza

Defensive backs
- 2 Desiree Weimann (FS)
- 22 Duece Reyes (SS)
- 5 Stephanie Thomlinson
- 33 Tracy Wong

Special teams

- 91 Andrea Grant

Multiple Positions

- currently vacant

Injured reserve
- currently vacant

Exempt List

- currently vacant

Practice squad

- currently vacant
- rookies in italics
- Roster updated May 12, 2012
- 46 Active, 0 Inactive, 0 PS

== 2011 ==
=== Standings ===
2011 South Pacific Division
	W	L	T	PCT	PF	PA	DIV	GB	STK
y-San Diego Surge	8	0	0	1.000	483	54	4-0	---	W8
Pacific Warriors	4	4	0	0.500	173	193	2-2	4.0	L3
Las Vegas Showgirlz	3	5	0	0.375	48	251	0-4	5.0	L1

=== Season schedule ===
Date	Opponent	Home/Away	Result
April 9	Las Vegas Showgirlz	Home	Won 84-0
April 16	Los Angeles Amazons	Away	Won 74-0
April 30	Pacific Warriors	Home	Won 82-0
May 7	Arizona Assassins	Home	Won 55-20
May 14	Silver State Legacy	Home	Won 48-15
May 21	Las Vegas Showgirlz	Away	Won 55-0
June 4	Bay Area Bandits	Away	Won 42-13
June 11	Pacific Warriors	Away	Won 43-6
June 25	Silver State Legacy (American Conference Quarterfinal)	Home	Won 41-7
July 9	Bay Area Bandits (American Conference Semifinal)	Home	Won 36-0
July 16	Dallas Diamonds (American Conference Championship)	Home	Won 48-20
July 30	Boston Militia (WFA National Championship)	Neutral (Bedford, TX)	Lost 19-34

== 2012 ==
=== Season schedule ===
Date	Opponent	Home/Away	Result
April 21	Silver State Legacy	Home	Won 42-0
April 28	Arizona Assassins	Away	Won 64-0
May 5	Pacific Warriors	Away	Won 69-12
May 12	West Coast Lightning	Away	Won 55-0
May 19	Bay Area Bandits	Home	Won 57-0
June 2	Silver State Legacy	Away	Won 48-0
June 9	Arizona Assassins	Home	Won 62-0
June 16	Pacific Warriors	Home	Won 49-0
June 30	Pacific Warriors	Home	Won 48-0
