= Chicago Winds (2024) =

American football team

- Founded: 2024
- League: Women's National Football Conference
- Based in: Chicago, Illinois
- Stadium: Perspectives High School of Technology
- CEO: Angelique Smith
- Head coach: Allen Williams

The Chicago Winds are a women's American football team based in Chicago, Illinois, that competes in the Women's National Football Conference (WNFC) as a member of the Central Division. The team plays its home games at Perspectives High School of Technology. As with other WFNC teams, the Winds have both a tackle and flag football team.

== History ==
The team was founded by Angelique Smith in 2024 and played their first season in 2025. Smith, a former player on the Chicago Force, was the first Black woman to hold a majority ownership stake in a professional sports franchise in Chicago.

== 2026 Season ==
The team will play six games between March and May 2026.

Game #	Date	Opponent	Home/Away	Result
1	March 28	Tennessee Trojans	Home	W 33-0
2	April 4	Mississippi Panthers	Away	L 24-0
3	April 18	Texas Elite Spartans	Away	L 0-28
4	April 25	Washington Prodigy	Home	L 23-0
5	May 9	Atlanta Truth	Home	L 14-0
6	May 16	Jersey Shore Wave	Away	W 37-0
