= Tennessee Trojans =

American football team

- Founded: 2022
- League: Women's National Football Conference
- Based in: Clarksville, Tennessee
- Stadium: Rossview High School
- CEO: Tessa and Rachael Ortiz-Marsh

The Tennessee Trojans are a women's American football team based in Clarksville, Tennessee, that competes in the Women's National Football Conference (WNFC) as a member of the Central Division. The team plays its home games at Rossview High School. Games may be watched on Victory+.

== History ==
The team was founded in 2022 by Tessa and Rachael Ortiz-Marsh and played their first season in 2023.

== 2026 Schedule ==
The team played six games between March and May 2026.

| Game # | Date | Opponent | Home/Away | Result |
|---|---|---|---|---|
| 1 | March 28 | Chicago Winds | Away | L 33-0 |
| 2 | April 4 | Florida Avengers | Home | L 21-0 |
| 3 | April 11 | Los Angeles Legends | Away | L 0-23 |
| 4 | April 25 | Texas Elite Spartans | Home | L 68-0 |
| 5 | May 2 | Florida Avengers | Away | L 6-29 |
| 6 | May 9 | Mississippi Panthers | Home | L 48-0 |

== Previous Years ==
Season records
| Season | W | L | T | Finish | Playoff results |
|---|---|---|---|---|---|
| 2023 | 1 | 5 | 0 | 4th Atlantic Division | |
| 2024 | 3 | 3 | 0 | 3rd Atlantic Division | |
| 2025 | 2 | 4 | 0 | 4th Atlantic Division | |
