= Kansas City Glory =

- Founded: 2019
- League: WNFC
- Based in: Kansas City, Missouri
- Stadium: Robert L. Hicks Field at Pembroke High School
- CEO: Keke Blackmon
- Head coach: Keke Blackmon

The Kansas City Glory are a women's American football team based in Kansas City, Missouri, that competes in the Women's National Football Conference (WNFC) as a member of the Northwest Division. The team plays its home games at Robert L. Hicks Field at the Pembroke Hill School.

== History ==
Kansas City previously had football teams of the Tribe and Spartans in the Women's Football Alliance starting in 2007, but disbanded in 2019. That same year Keke Blackmon founded the Glory as part of the WNFC.

== 2026 Season ==
The team will play six games between March and May 2026.

Game #	Date	Opponent	Home/Away	Result
1	March 28	Seattle Majestics	Home	W 41-2
2	April 4	Utah Falconz	Away	L 18-16
3	April 11	Oregon Ravens	Home	W 14-23
4	May 2	San Diego Rebellion	Home	W 14-20
5	May 9	Texas Elite Spartans	Away	L 6-40
6	May 16	Las Vegas Silver Stars	Away	W 53-0
