= Women's National Football Conference =

Women's American football league

- Sport: Women's American football
- Founded: 2018; 8 years ago
- Founder: Odessa Jenkins
- First season: 2019
- President: Elizabeth Jenkins
- Commissioner: Janice Masters
- No. of teams: 17
- Country: United States
- Most recent champion: Texas Elite Spartans (2025)
- Most titles: Texas Elite Spartans (5 titles)
- Sponsors: Adidas; Riddell; Dick's Sporting Goods; United Sports Brands

The Women's National Football Conference (WNFC) is a professional, 11-on-11, full-contact women's American football league in the United States. With teams across the U.S., the WNFC had its first on-field game in 2019 with fourteen regular teams and one exhibition team.

The league's fist championship game, known as the IX Cup, was won by the Texas Elite Spartans. They have also won the most championships of any team in the league.

The WNFC's sponsorship partners have included Adidas, Riddell, Dove, and Dick's Sporting Goods.

== League history ==
The Women's National Football Conference was founded by former Women's Football Alliance (WFA) player and then coach Odessa Jenkins in 2018, with its inaugural season in 2019.

On December 10, 2018, the WNFC announced a partnership with Adidas, as part of the latter's "She Breaks Barriers" initiative. As part of the partnership, Adidas serves as the WNFC's presenting sponsor, with all WNFC teams wearing custom-made Adidas uniforms.

=== 2019 ===
The WNFC played its inaugural season in 2019 with fourteen regular teams and one exhibition team. Five teams came to the WNFC from the Independent Women's Football League (IWFL), which folded after its 2018 season: the Utah Falconz, Texas Elite Spartans, the San Diego Surge, the Seattle Majestics, and the Los Angeles Bobcats. Three teams came from the WFA: the Atlanta Phoenix, the Alabama Fire, and the San Diego Rebellion. Two teams came from the U.S. Women's Football League (USWFL): the North Florida Pumas and the Houston Heat. Finally, five teams were playing their inaugural seasons: the Nebraska Nite Hawks, the Las Vegas Silver Stars, the Denver Bandits, the New Orleans Hippies, and the Phoenix Prowlers.

The season began on April 6 and ended with the inaugural IX Cup (named in honor of Title IX) on June 29, which saw the Texas Elite Spartans defeat the Utah Falconz 19–14.

In October 2019, the WNFC launched the anti-bullying, girls empowerment program, Got Her Back.

=== 2020 ===
The WNFC added seven teams for the 2020 season: three from the WFA, two from the USWFL, and three expansion teams. This brought the league to 20 teams. No games were played due to the COVID-19 pandemic.

In May 2020, it was announced that the WNFC had received the Adidas + iFundWomen grant. Three Stripes, along with sports equipment company Riddell, would outfit the teams for their sophomore season in 2021.

=== 2021 ===
In 2021, the WNFC and streaming platform VYRE Network entered into a multi-year contract to stream all of the league's games for the 2022 season.

The league partnered with Promus Diagnostic to provided weekly COVID-19 testing for players and staff starting April 1, 2021. The WNFC returned to play with 20 teams on May 1, 2021. According to VYRE, the first week saw the highest viewership numbers of the season, with 363,513 impressions logged.

The season ended with Texas Elite Spartans defeating the San Diego Rebellion 27–6 on August 9, at UNT Apogee Stadium in Denton, Texas. The championship game was watched by 21,312 users.

=== 2022 ===
The WNFC played Week 1 of its 2022 season on April 2. The league had added a new team, the Los Angeles Legends, in the fall of 2021 with their inaugural season being 2022. The season ended with the Texas Elite Spartans defeating the Utah Falconz 48–12. The championship game was watched by 77,546 users, over 50,000 more users than the previous year's.

It was reported that viewership across all Vyre Network platforms had increased by 475% from 2021, throughout the course of the 2022 season.

In June 2022, Dick's Sporting Goods became an official retail partner of the WNFC.

=== 2023 ===
For the 2023 season, the WNFC launched its own direct-to-consumer streaming service, wScore, in which all games would be available. Live and on-demand coverage of select games was also available through a partnership with Caffeine TV.

The WNFC played Week 1 of its 2023 season on April 1. The league had added a new team, the Tennessee Trojans, bringing the total number of teams to 18. The season ended with the Texas Elite Spartans defeating the Mississippi Lady Panthers 49–7.

According to Caffeine, there were over 700,000 views on the platform within the first week and 10 million streams across all league content.

=== 2024 ===
Before the start of the 2024 season, it was announced that Caffeine had expanded its content rights agreement with the WNFC. It was also announced that the WNFC had secured a five-year (2024–2028) deal with sports streaming platform DAZN.

The WNFC played Week 1 of its 2024 season on April 6. All games were streamed on Caffeine and DAZN. The season ended with the Mississippi Lady Panthers defeating the Texas Elite Spartans 13–6.

On May 9, 2024, the WNFC announced a partnership with Gridiron Football.

On November 24, 2024, the WNFC announced it had raised $1 million in seed funding.

=== 2025 ===
In February 2025, Got Her Back, the WNFC's official charity, and ReNEW Schools held a free Girls’ Football and Empowerment Camp open to girls ages 8–18 on the eve of the NFL's Super Bowl LIX. The event also marked the start of the WNFC’s partnership with beauty brand Dove.

The WNFC played Week 1 of its 2025 season on March 29. The league had added three new teams that season: the Jersey Shore Wave, the Atlanta Truth, and the Chicago Winds.

The WNFC does not pay its players salaries. However, as of mid-2025, it planned to give $20,000 to the championship team and had budgeted to pay weekly and season award-winners.

In June 2025, the IX Cup game was the first WNFC game to be broadcast on ESPN2. It reached 150,000 viewers. The Texas Elite Spartans beat the Washington Prodigy 21–19.

In October 2025, the WNFC announced it was expanding its flag football program to all 16 WNFC markets.

In December 2025, it was announced that the partnership between the WNFC and Adidas had been extended through 2028.

=== 2026 ===
For the 2026 season, WNFC games were available on Victory+, a free ad-supported streaming service. The WNFC played Week 1 of its 2026 season on March 28. The league had added a new team, the Golden State Storm, making for 16 teams.

In June 2026, it was announced that the WNFC's contract with ESPN had been extended.

The season ended with the Texas Elite Spartans defeating the San Diego Rebellion 34–14.

== Rules of play ==
WNFC games are played 11-on-11 in full gear (pads and helmets) under NCAA college football rules with 12-minute quarters. Teams play an eight-game regular season and are divided into three conferences: Atlantic, Central, and Pacific.

Some WNFC rules differ from those of the NCAA , specifically:

- After a touchdown, the scoring team has options for a one-, two-, or three-point extra point.
- Scores by the defense are worth nine points, instead of the usual six points. This is also called a "Pick IX", a reference to Title IX.
- Kickoffs are made from the 45-yard line.

== Current teams ==
Team	Location	Venue	Head coach	Founded	Joined
Atlanta Truth	Lawrenceville, Georgia	Central Gwinnett High School	Kameron Marks	2024	2025
Chicago Winds	Elmhurst, Illinois	Perspectives High School of Technology	Allan Williams	2024	2024
Florida Avengers	Jacksonville, Florida	First Coast High School	Damien Grimes	2019	2020
Jersey Shore Wave	Paterson, New Jersey	Hinchliffe Stadium	Fabian Alesandro	2024	2024
Kansas City Glory	Overland Park, Kansas	Robert L. Hicks Field	KeKe Blackmon	2019	2019
Las Vegas Silver Stars	Las Vegas, Nevada	Mater Academy Football Stadium	Carrie Walters	2017	2019
Los Angeles Legends	Gardena, California	Long Beach Polytechnic High School	Monique Moe Adams and Tim Holmes	2021	2022
Mississippi Panthers	Madison, Mississippi	Madison Ridgeland Academy	LeSteven Jackson	2018	2020
Golden State Storm	Oakland, California	Laney Field	Dallas Hartwell	2026	2026
Oregon Ravens	Milwaukie, Oregon	Milwaukie High School	Tim Price	2019	2019
San Diego Rebellion	Escondido, California	Escondido High School	Knengi Martin	2017	2019
Seattle Majestics	Kent, Washington	French Field	Rodney McCurry	2002	2019
Tennessee Trojans	Nashville, Tennessee	Rossview High School	Kim Corbett	2022	2023
Texas Elite Spartans	Lewisville, Texas	Maverick Stadium	Odessa Jenkins	2017	2019
Utah Falconz	Murray, Utah	Cottonwood High School	Keith Barnes	2014	2019
Washington Prodigy	Washington, D.C.	Theodore Roosevelt Senior High School	LaMont Jordan	2012	2020

=== Map of teams ===
Current WNFC team locations. Pacific Division teams in blue; Northwest Division teams in yellow; Central Division teams in green; Atlantic Division teams in red.

== Former teams ==
- Houston Mambas — Played in the WNFC from 2022–2025
- Denver Bandits — Played in the WNFC from 2019–2025
- New Orleans Hippies — Played in the WNFC in 2019
- North Florida Pumas — Played in the WNFC in 2019
- San Diego Surge — Played in the WNFC in 2019
- Nebraska Nite Hawks — Played in the WNFC from 2019–2021
- Carolina Queens — Played in the WNFC in 2021
- Los Angeles Bobcats — Played in the WNFC from 2019–2021
- Alabama Fire — Played in the WNFC from 2019–2022, now a member of the WFA
- Phoenix Prowlers — Played in the WNFC from 2019–2022
- La Muerte De Las Cruces — Played in the WNFC from 2021–2022
- Atlanta Phoenix — Played in the WNFC from 2019–2024
- Philly Phantomz — Played in the WNFC from 2018–2024

== IX Cup ==
Year	Title	Home team	Away team	Score	Ref.
2019	2019 IX Cup	Texas Elite Spartans	Utah Falconz	19–14	
2020	No games played due to COVID-19				
2021	2021 IX Cup	Texas Elite Spartans	San Diego Rebellion	27–6	
2022	2022 IX Cup	Texas Elite Spartans	Utah Falconz	48–14	
2023	2023 IX Cup	Texas Elite Spartans	Mississippi Panthers	49–7	
2024	2024 IX Cup	Texas Elite Spartans	Mississippi Panthers	6–13	
2025	2025 IX Cup	Texas Elite Spartans	Washington Prodigy	21–19	
2026	2026 IX Cup	Texas Elite Spartans	San Diego Rebellion	34–14	
