= San Diego Rebellion =

Women's American football team

- Founded: 2017
- League: WNFC (2019–present), WFA (2017–2018)
- Based in: San Diego, California
- Stadium: Escondido High School
- Head coach: Knengi Martin

The San Diego Revolution are a women's American football team based in San Diego, California, that competes in the Women's National Football Conference (WNFC) as a member of the Pacific Division. The team plays its home games at Escondido High School in Escondido, California.

== History ==
The team was founded in 2017 by Katie Ott and Knengi Martin. The team originally played in the Women's Football Alliance before joining the WNFC in 2019.

== 2026 season ==
The team will play six games between March and May 2026.

Game #	Date	Opponent	Home/Away	Result
1	March 28	Golden State Storm	Away	W 36-0
2	April 4	Los Angeles Legends	Home	W 28-13
3	April 11	Las Vegas Silver Stars	Away	W 24-6
4	April 25	Golden State Storm	Home	W 0-17
5	May 2	Kansas City Glory	Away	L 14-20
6	May 16	Utah Falconz	Home	W 0-53
