= Oregon Ravens =

- Founded: 2018 or 2020
- League: Women's National Football Conference
- Based in: Portland, Oregon
- Stadium: Milwaukie High School
- CEO: Oana Dumitrescu
- Head coach: Robby Scharf

The Oregon Ravens are a women's American football team based in Portland, Oregon, that competes in the Women's National Football Conference (WNFC) as a member of the Northwest Division. The team plays its home games at Milwaukie High School in Milwaukie, Oregon.

== History ==
Different sources give different dates for the founding of the Ravens. Some say the team was founded in 2018 by Odessa “OJ” Jenkins, while other sources say they were founded in 2020 by two former Portland Shockwave players, Leah Hinkle and Oana Dumitrescu. Dumitrescu is currently listed as the team's President

== 2026 season ==
The team will play six games between March and May 2026.

Game #	Date	Opponent	Home/Away	Result
1	March 28	Utah Falconz	Home	L 14-6
2	April 4	Seattle Majestics	Home	W 18-14
3	April 11	Kansas City Glory	Away	L 14-23
4	May 2	Golden State Storm	Away	L 8-14
5	May 9	Las Vegas Silver Stars	Home	W 21-28
6	May 16	Seattle Majestics	Away	W 16-12

== See also ==
- Women's sports in Portland, Oregon
