= Las Vegas Silver Stars =

Women's American football team

- Founded: 2018
- League: Women's National Football Conference
- Based in: Las Vegas, Nevada
- Stadium: Mater Academy Football Stadium
- CEO: Carrie Walters
- Head coach: Carrie Walters

The Las Vegas Silver Stars are a women's American football team based in Las Vegas, Nevada, that competes in the Women's National Football Conference (WNFC) as a member of the Pacific Division. The team plays its home games at Mater Academy Football Stadium.

== History ==
The team was founded in 2018 by Carrie Walters.

== 2026 season ==
The team will play six games between March and May 2026.

Game #	Date	Opponent	Home/Away	Result
1	March 28	Los Angeles Legends	Home	L 37-7
2	April 4	Golden State Storm	Away	L 31-2
3	April 11	San Diego Rebellion	Home	L 24-6
4	April 18	Utah Falconz	Away	L 19-26
5	May 9	Oregon Ravens	Away	L 21-28
6	May 16	Kansas City Glory	Home	L 53-0
