= Washington Prodigy =

American football team

- Founded: 2012
- League: Women's National Football Conference
- Based in: Washington D.C.
- Stadium: Coolidge Senior High School
- CEO: Tiffany Matthews
- Head coach: LaMont Jordan

The Washington Prodigy are a women's American football team based in Washington D.C., that competes in the Women's National Football Conference (WNFC) as a member of the Atlantic Division. The team plays its home games at Coolidge Senior High School. The Prodigy are a 501(c)(3) organization.

== History ==
The team was founded in 2012 by Tiffany Matthews. The team started with 14 players, including Matthews who played, coached, and owned the team.

== 2025 Season ==
In 2025 the Prodigy were undefeated in the regular season, Eastern Conference champions, and runners-up in the IX cup game. In that final game the Prodigy lost 21–19 to the Texas Elite Spartans in a game broadcast on ESPN2.

== 2026 Season ==
The team will play six games between March and May 2026.

Game #	Date	Opponent	Home/Away	Result
1	March 28	Atlanta Truth	Away	W 16-12
2	April 4	Texas Elite Spartans	Home	L 26-6
3	April 18	Jersey Shore Wave	Away	W 59-20
4	April 25	Chicago Winds	Away	W 23-0
5	May 9	Jersey Shore Wave	Home	W 0-57
6	May 16	Florida Avengers	Home	W 0-34
