= Florida Avengers =

American football team

- Founded: 2019
- League: Women's National Football Conference
- Based in: Jacksonville, Florida
- Stadium: First Coast High School
- CEO: Kim Rocky Phillips
- Head coach: Damien Grimes

The Florida Avengers are a women's American football team based in Jacksonville, Florida, that competes in the Women's National Football Conference (WNFC) as a member of the Atlantic Division. The team plays its home games at First Coast High School.

== History ==
The team was founded in 2019 and played their first season that same year.

== Players ==
Some of the Avengers players have been recruited directly out of high school. Brooke Zeller played both girls flag football and wide receiver on a boys tackle football before being signed to the team.

== 2026 Season ==
The team is playing six games between March and May 2026.

Game #	Date	Opponent	Home/Away	Result
1	March 28	Jersey Shore Wave	Home	L 13–12
2	April 4	Tennessee Trojans	Away	W 21-0
3	April 18	Atlanta Truth	Home	L 62-2
4	April 25	Mississippi Panthers	Away	L 0-47
5	May 2	Tennessee Trojans	Home	W 6-29
6	May 16	Washington Prodigy	Away	L 0-34

== Previous Years ==
Season records
Season	W	L	T	Finish	Playoff results
No games in 2020
2021	2	4	0	8th Atlantic Conference	
2022	1	5	0	7th Atlantic Conference	
2023	1	5	0	5th Atlantic Division	
2024	0	6	0	5th Atlantic Division	
2025	1	5	0	6th Atlantic Division	
