= Texas Elite Spartans =

Women's American football team

- Founded: 2018
- League: WNFC
- Based in: Lewisville, Texas
- Stadium: Maverick Stadium in Arlington, Texas
- CEO: Odessa Jenkins
- Head coach: Odessa Jenkins

The Texas Elite Spartans are a women's American football team based in Lewisville, Texas, that competes in the Women's National Football Conference (WNFC) as a member of the Central Division. The team plays its home games at Maverick Stadium at the University of Texas at Arlington.

== History ==
The team was founded by Odessa Jenkins in 2018. Since then Jenkins has coached the Elite Spartans to five WNFC championships, including four consecutive titles from 2019-2023.

== 2026 season ==
The team will play six games between March and May 2026.

Game #	Date	Opponent	Home/Away	Result
1	March 28	Mississippi Panthers	Home	W 14-6
2	April 4	Washington Prodigy	Away	W 26-6
3	April 18	Chicago Winds	Home	W 28-0
4	April 25	Tennessee Trojans	Away	W 68-0
5	May 9	Kansas City Glory	Home	W 40-6
6	May 16	Mississippi Panthers	Away	W 40-12
