= 2022 Racquetball World Championships – Women's singles =

Mixed doubles at the XXI Racquetball World Championships
- Location: San Luis Potosi, Mexico
- Dates: August 20–27

Medalists
gold medal	(Mexico) Paola Longoria
silver medal	(Guatemala) Gabriela Martinez
bronze medal	(Bolivia) Angélica Barrios (Mexico) Alexandra Herrera

The International Racquetball Federation's 21st Racquetball World Championships were held in San Luis Potosi, Mexico from August 20-27, 2022. This was the first time that Worlds was held in Mexico since 2000, when it was also held in San Luis Potosi.

The 2022 World Championships used a best-of-five games match format, with each game played to 11 points, win by 2, with rally scoring, as used in other sports like squash and volleyball. Previously, racquetball games used side-out scoring, where players scored points only when they had won a rally which began with that player serving. Rallies won when not serving were simply side-outs: the rally losing player lost the serve and the rally winning player won the opportunity to serve, but did not win a point.

In 2022, Mexican Paola Longoria won women's singles for a record-extending fifth time by defeating Guatemalan Gabriela Martinez in the final, 12-10, 11-7, 11-7. This was the third time in the last four World Championships that Longoria and Martinez met in the women's singles final. They split the previous two times: Longoria winning in 2016 and Martinez in 2018.

== Tournament format ==
The 2022 World Championships used a two-stage format to determine the World Champions. Initially, players competed in separate groups over three days. The results were used to seed players for the medal round, with only the top two players from each group advancing to the medal round.

== Women's singles ==
=== Group stages ===
Group 1

Players	Pld	W	L	GW	GL	PW	PL	Place
(United States) Erika Manilla	2	2	0	6	0	66	30	1
(Ecuador) Maria Paz Muñoz	2	1	1	3	4	59	66	2
(Colombia) Maria Paz Riquelme	2	0	2	1	6	48	77	3

Group 2

Players	Pld	W	L	GW	GL	PW	PL	Place
(Argentina) Natalia Mendez	2	2	0	6	0	68	31	1
(Bolivia) Jenny Daza	2	1	1	3	3	54	50	2
(Canada) Danielle Drury	2	0	2	0	6	25	66	3

Group 3

Players	Pld	W	L	GW	GL	PW	PL	Place
(United States) Rhonda Rajsich	3	3	0	9	1	104	62	1
(Colombia) Cristina Amaya	3	2	1	7	4	108	86	2
(Ecuador) Ana Lucia Sarmiento	3	1	2	4	6	70	72	3
(Cuba) Yurisleidis Araujo	3	0	3	0	9	37	99	4

Group 4

Players	Pld	W	L	GW	GL	PW	PL	Place
(Argentina) Valeria Centellas	3	3	0	9	2	116	71	1
(Bolivia) Angélica Barrios	3	2	1	8	3	114	89	2
(Canada) Juliette Parent	3	1	2	3	6	62	66	3
(Cuba) Maria Regla	3	0	3	0	9	33	99	4

Group 5

Players	Pld	W	L	GW	GL	PW	PL	Place
(Mexico) Paola Longoria	3	3	0	9	0	99	84	1
(Chile) Carla Muñoz	3	2	1	6	3	84	65	2
(Japan) Ayako Hanashi	3	1	2	3	7	64	101	3
(Guatemala) Jazmin Elizabeth Aguilar Salvateirra	3	0	3	1	9	62	109	4

Group 6

Players	Pld	W	L	GW	GL	PW	PL	Place
(Guatemala) Gabriela Martinez	3	3	0	9	2	106	72	1
(Mexico) Alexandra Herrera	3	2	1	8	3	112	63	2
(Chile) Paula Mansilla	3	0	3	3	9	135	164	3
Removed	-	-	-	-	-	-	-	-

=== Medal round ===
First round
9	(Bolivia) Angélica Barrios	11	11	11
8	(Chile) Carla Muñoz	9	4	3
5	(Mexico) Paola Longoria	11	11	11
12	(Bolivia) Jenny Daza	5	7	5
11	(Ecuador) Maria Paz Muñoz	5	8	6
6	(Guatemala) Gabriela Martinez	11	11	11
7	(Mexico) Alexandra Herrera	11	11	11
10	(Colombia) Cristina Amaya	8	7	7

Quarterfinals
1	(United States) Erika Manilla	6	9	11	7
9	(Bolivia) Angélica Barrios	11	11	5	11
5	(Mexico) Paola Longoria	11	11	12
4	(Argentina) Valeria Centellas	2	6	10
3	(United States) Rhonda Rajsich	10	5	11	10
6	(Guatemala) Gabriela Martinez	12	11	7	12
7	(Mexico) Alexandra Herrera	11	11	11
2	(Argentina) Natalia Mendez	8	3	8

Semifinals
9	(Bolivia) Angélica Barrios	9	11	5	4
5	(Mexico) Paola Longoria	11	8	11	11
6	(Guatemala) Gabriela Martinez	12	11	11
7	(Mexico) Alexandra Herrera	10	6	9

Final
5	(Mexico) Paola Longoria	12	11	11
6	(Guatemala) Gabriela Martinez	10	7	7
