= San Francisco Bay Storm =

Women's American football team

- Founded: 2025
- League: Women's National Football Conference
- Based in: Oakland, California
- Stadium: Laney Stadium, Laney College
- CEO: Storm Ownership Group
- Head coach: Daniel Robinson

The San Francisco Bay Storm are a women's American football team based in Oakland, California, that competes in the Women's National Football Conference (WNFC) as a member of the Pacific Division. The team plays its home games at Laney Field on the campus of Laney College. They were known as the "Golden State Storm" during their first year.

Players are not paid, but some have received licensing deals.

As with many other WNFC teams, the Storm have both a tackle team and a flag football team, but the flag football team only plays in tournaments.

== History ==
The Storm were established in 2025 and played their first season in 2026. The team was founded by Jake Langner and Brad Grovich, who chose to locate the team in Oakland after being inspired by Laney College athletic director and football coach John Beam before his murder in 2025. The team wore Beam's initials in commemoration during their first season.

The current Board of Advisors includes former football coach Jay Paterno and former NFL players Reggie Stephens and Jeff Garcia.

== 2026 Season ==
The team played six games in their first season, between March and May 2026.

Game #	Date	Opponent	Home/Away	Result
1	March 28	San Diego Rebellion	Home	L 36-0
2	April 4	Las Vegas Silver Stars	Home	W 31-2
3	April 11	Seattle Majestics	Away	W 23-18
4	April 25	San Diego Rebellion	Away	L 0-17
5	May 2	Oregon Ravens	Home	W 8-14
6	May 16	Los Angeles Legends (football)	Away	L 14-28
