= Maverick Stadium =

Stadium in Arlington, Texas

- (The Mav)
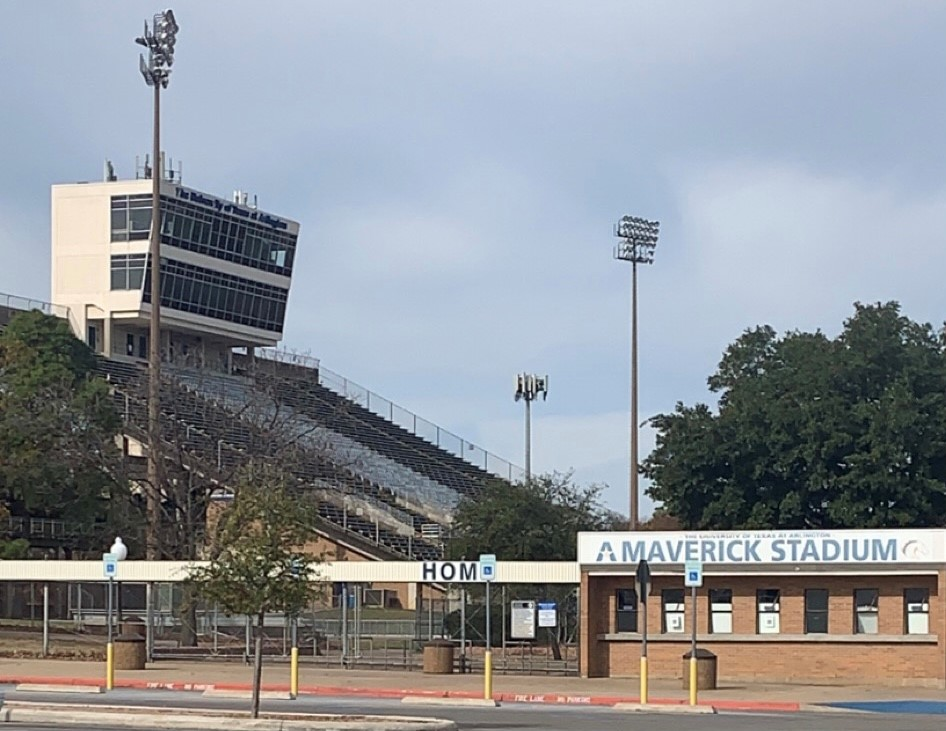
- Maverick Stadium's west grandstands and main entrance
- Interactive map of Maverick Stadium
- Location: Arlington, Texas
- Coordinates: 32°43′45.14″N 97°7′34.90″W
- Owner: University of Texas at Arlington
- Operator: University of Texas at Arlington Athletic Department
- Capacity: 12,000
- Surface: FieldTurf
- Record attendance: 18,033 vs. North Texas September 6, 1980

Construction
- Built: 1979–1980
- Opened: September 6, 1980
- Renovated: Playing surface and track 2009, locker rooms 2011, PA 2012
- Cost: $7 million
- General contractor: Walker Construction Co.

Tenants
- University of Texas at Arlington Track and Field; University of Texas at Arlington Flag Football (Spring 2027)

Website
- www.uta.edu/campus-ops/maverick-stadium/index.php

Maverick Stadium is a 12,000-seat multi-purpose stadium on the western edge of University of Texas at Arlington campus.

It hosts the university's track and field teams. At the start of the 2026/27 academic year, Maverick Stadium will host a women's flag football team at the varsity level.

After a brief hiatus as games left for nearby Choctaw Stadium, Maverick Stadium resumed hosting Arlington Independent School District football games in 2025.

It historically served as the site of 1–3 high school football playoff games every year, but the number has waned in recent years. The State of Texas' governing body for High School competition, the UIL uses the venue as the site for Regional track meets prior to the State meet in Austin, Texas.

The Mav is the home venue of the Texas Elite Spartans of the Women's National Football Conference. The Spartans have won five championships and posted a 3-0 home record in the most recent 2026 season.

The stadium previously served as UTA's home football stadium until the university dropped its program after the final game of the 1985 season.

The stadium can host football and soccer games, track and field meets, as well as many varied festivals and special events, including the annual Texas Scottish Festival and Highland Games, Special Olympics and Bed Races, an annual UTA tradition in the fall.

== Features ==
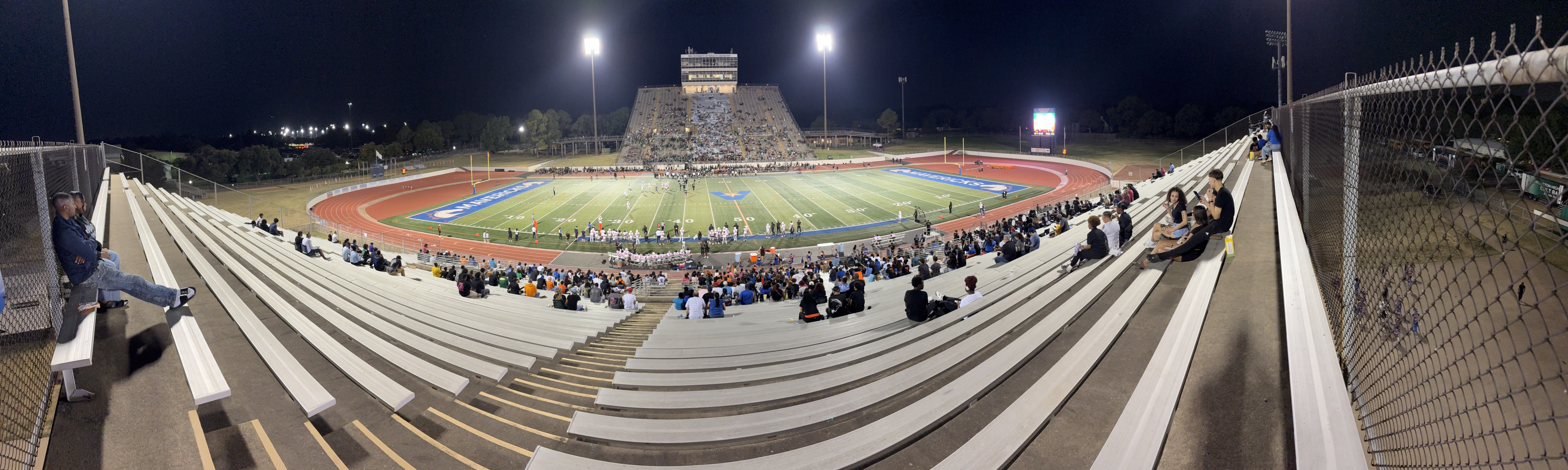
Panorama of Maverick Stadium

Maverick Stadium is composed of five major components, the playing field and track, west stands, east stands, the press box above the west stands and the locker rooms and support space underneath the west stands. The Gilstrap Athletic Center is a stand-alone building directly adjacent to the locker room section, directly north of the west stands. It had housed the entire UTA Athletic Offices, until College Park Center was built in 2012 and most of the Athletic Department moved to the new arena. It does access both the locker room and playing field.

The playing surface consists of FieldTurf artificial playing field and can be easily configured for soccer or football games. The field is circled by a 400-meter Polytan USA track surface.

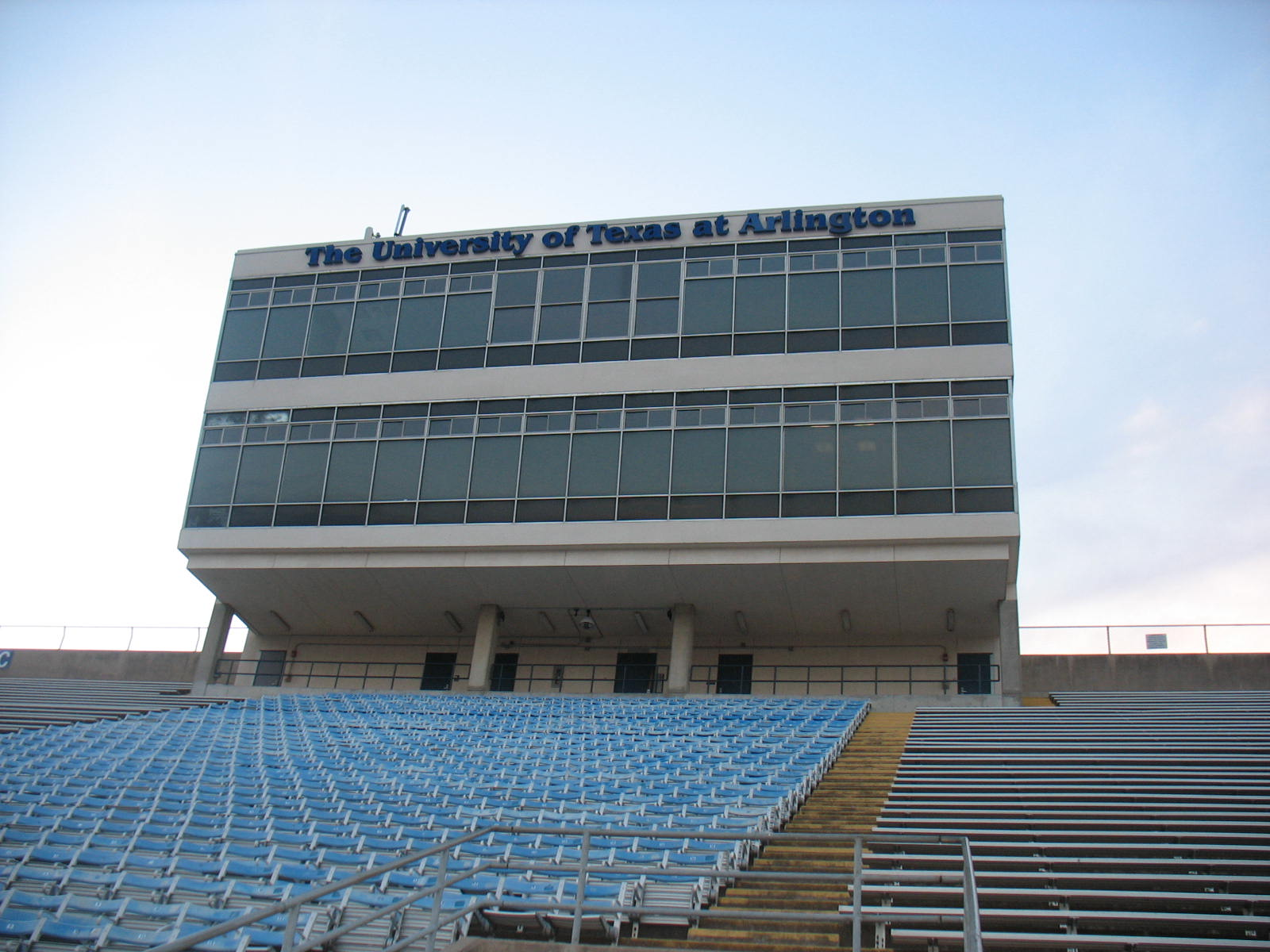
Maverick Stadium's press box and suites.

The west stands have a seating capacity of approximately 8,000, of which 1,831 are chair-back seats in the center section. The east can sit approximately 4,500. Architectural plans were designed for eventual capacity to reach 26,000 by expanding both ends of each section from its current terminus at the 15-yard lines to just past the end zones.

Underneath the west stands are the locker rooms, a full-sized, 3,700-square-foot weight room, equipment storage, other support functions and medical and training facilities, which include a hydrotherapy area, taping stations, treatment room and rehabilitation room. A reception room for formal events is also located in this area and can be accessed through the west entrance.

The press box is a three-story structure. The first level is an outdoor film deck while the top two contain space for radio and television broadcasts, print media, coach booths and suites. The press box has a 168-person capacity.

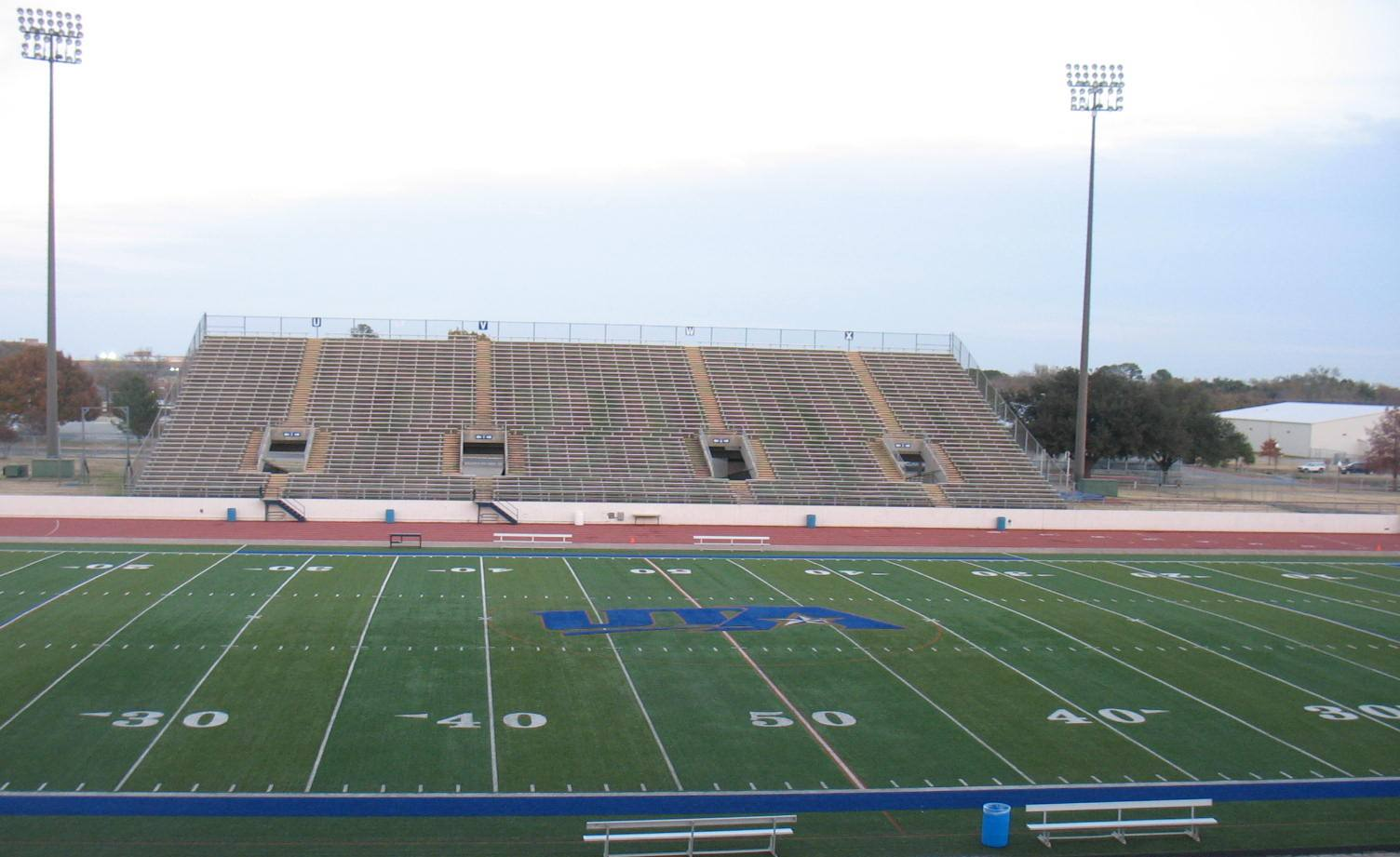
The playing field, installed in 2009, and the east stands, where the visitors sit.

There are five light poles in the stadium, four of which flood the field and the other on the field event venues on the northern side of the stadium. They are a mercury vapor with a total lighting capacity of 90 foot candles.

Fans primarily enter Maverick Stadium from the south, where a seven-window ticket booth faces out onto a 677-space parking lot. The home entrance is to the west of the booth, while the visitors entrance is to the east. There is also a seven-window ticket booth and entrance on the east side of the stadium directly behind the east stands.

Facilities for steeplechase and all field events are provided within the stadium. Javelin, shot put, and discuss areas are located north of the track and playing field, while the long jump, triple jump and pole vault pits are just south. The high jump area is between the field and track on the north end of Maverick Stadium.

There's a large, open grass field on the north side as well that had served as the practice field for the football team.

== History ==
Single-game crowds
Date	Opponent	Attendance	Result
September 6, 1980	North Texas	18,033	14–31
October 9, 1982	North Texas	9,487	3–17
September 8, 1984	West Texas A&M	9,367	27–19
September 22, 1984	Texas State	9,048	48–13
October 6, 1984	Stephen F. Austin State	8,894	21–27
September 11, 1982	Sam Houston State	8,519	63–10
November 21, 1981	Lamar*	8,437	31–7
October 27, 1984	Arkansas State^	8,276	21–51
October 2, 1982	Louisiana Tech	8,149	14–17
September 17, 1983	Louisiana-Monroe	7,338	10–16
	^ Homecoming * Clinched SLC championship		

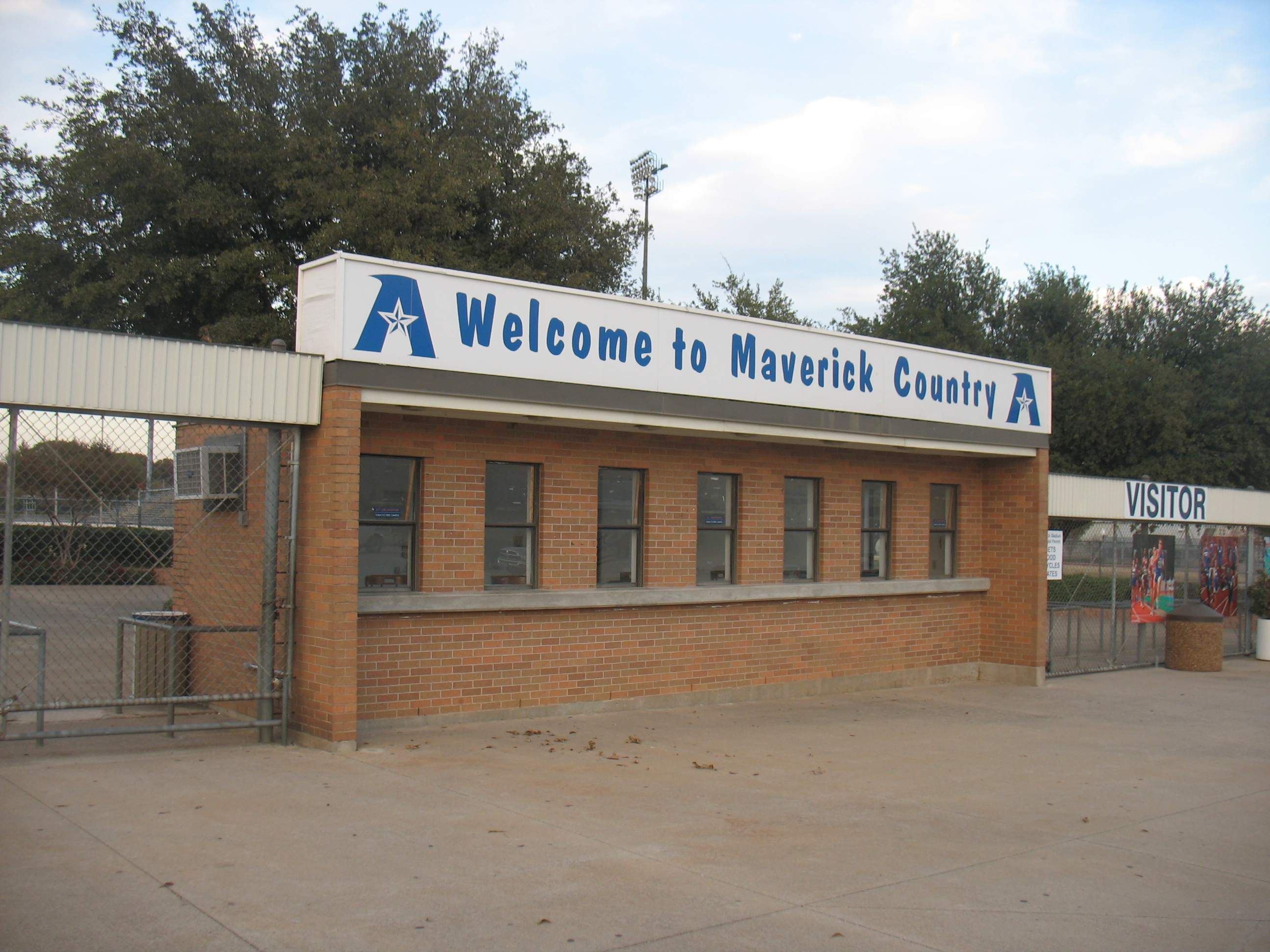
Maverick Stadium's ticket booth

When UTA began playing football as a four-year institution in 1959, they played their games in Memorial Stadium. The on-campus venue, coupled with successful football seasons, consistently saw the Stadium at or over the 10,022 capacity. After the 1969 season, UTA left Memorial Stadium, though local high school teams would still play there for several more years. The venue was demolished in winter 1973 to make way for the current Maverick Activities Center.

UTA averaged around 9,000 in attendance from 1966 to 1969. However, the university viewed Memorial Stadium as small and outdated. UTA was planning a move to the university level, the highest level of college football at that time, and decided they needed to play in a bigger venue to encourage higher-level teams to play in Arlington. This was needed to move up as the NCAA required half the schedule be against university-level competition. Along with the urging of Arlington City Hall, who just bought Turnpike Stadium from Tarrant County, the Mavericks began playing their home games at a multi-purpose, off-campus stadium built primarily for baseball, though it could be converted for football use, in 1970.

When the Washington Senators moved from Washington D.C. to Arlington and changed their name to the Texas Rangers, they became the primary tenants of the stadium. This created conflicts between the franchise and the University. One notable example was when the Rangers exercised a clause giving them control over the stadium 24 hours before and after home games. UTA had to play their 1974 home opener at the Cotton Bowl in Dallas, about 25 miles away from campus. UTA would occasionally have to play in other venues as well, such as Cravens Field, a facility in North Arlington that is owned and operated by the Arlington Independent School District.

Finally, after renovations were announced that the now-renamed Arlington Stadium would become a permanent baseball facility, the UTA football team eventually moved their home games to Cravens Field from 1977 to 1979. UTA's all-time home record at Arlington Stadium was a measly 11–18, a winning percentage of .379 (compared to .670 at Memorial Stadium), while they were 8–6 at Cravens.

The UTA Athletic Department knew that Turnpike Stadium and Cravens Field weren't long-term homes. They were working on a way to move the UTA football program into their own facility on campus. Preliminary approval for Maverick Stadium was issued by the UT System Board of Regents in November 1977. This cleared the way for planning to begin and the Regents approved the final plans in October 1978. After bids were approved later that year, construction began early in 1979 on the site of the football practice fields on the west side of campus.

Yearly attendance
Season	Average	High
1980	8,062	18,033
1981	6,522	8,437
1982	7,588	9,487
1983	5,554	7,338
1984	7,496	9,367
1985	5,600	7,205

After more than a decade, the first on-campus football game was played as the University of North Texas opened the venue in front of a record crowd of 18,033, an eventual 31–14 loss for UTA. It also was the first ESPN college football broadcast, as the fledgling network had just begun operations. Due to the NCAA's television contract, the game couldn't be shown live and was a tape-delayed broadcast.

The Mavericks finished their inaugural year at Maverick Stadium with a 1–5 home record, winning their final game against Arkansas State in front a crowd of 4,691. Despite the record attendance of the first game, Maverick Stadium averaged 8,062 fans per home game the first year.

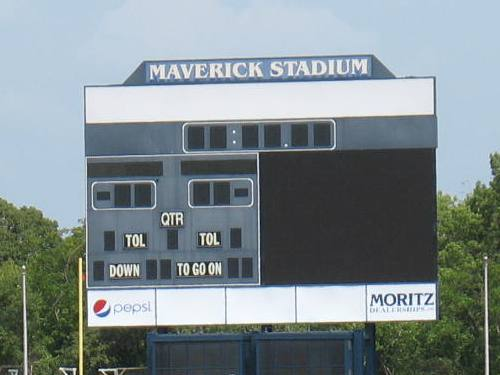
Maverick Stadium's former scoreboard.

The team would do a better job defending their home turf in the following years as they compiled a record of 16–11 following the 1980 season, for a total Maverick Stadium home record of 17–16. In 1981, UTA went 4–1 there on their way to winning their final Southland Conference championship. It was also their last year participating at the NCAA's highest level of football, then known as Division I-A, as the NCAA would reclassify UTA and almost the entire Southland Conference as Division I-AA

The last home game in Maverick Stadium for UTA's football program was against Louisiana Tech on November 16, 1985. The 29–14 loss to the Bulldogs eliminated UTA from the Southland Conference championship race, the second year in a row the Bulldogs had ended UTA's championship run. The final game at the stadium was attended by 4,800 fans, the smallest of the year. UTA finished 3–2 at home in 1985.

Maverick Stadium served as the site for the Southland Conference outdoor track meet in 1981, 1986, 1992, 2001, 2002, 2006 and 2010, the Western Athletic Conference meet in 2013 and 2025 and the Sun Belt Conference championship in 2017.

The men have won 11 team conference championships and five runners-up finishes since the stadium opened, along with 23 event All-Americans. It has been the site of two meets where the Mavericks won a conference championship, in 1992 and 2017. The women have won six team titles, seven runners-up and ten All-Americans. The 2001 meet was the only championship the women's team won at their home venue.

=== Renovations ===
Since 2009, Maverick Stadium has undergone many renovations to increase the amenities for the athletes and spectators in order to keep it a desirable place to hold athletic contests and special events.

In 2009, the older artificial turf was replaced with FieldTurf. The track was replaced around the same time with a Polytan USA track surface. It is a standard Olympic 400-meter track with various other field event capabilities.

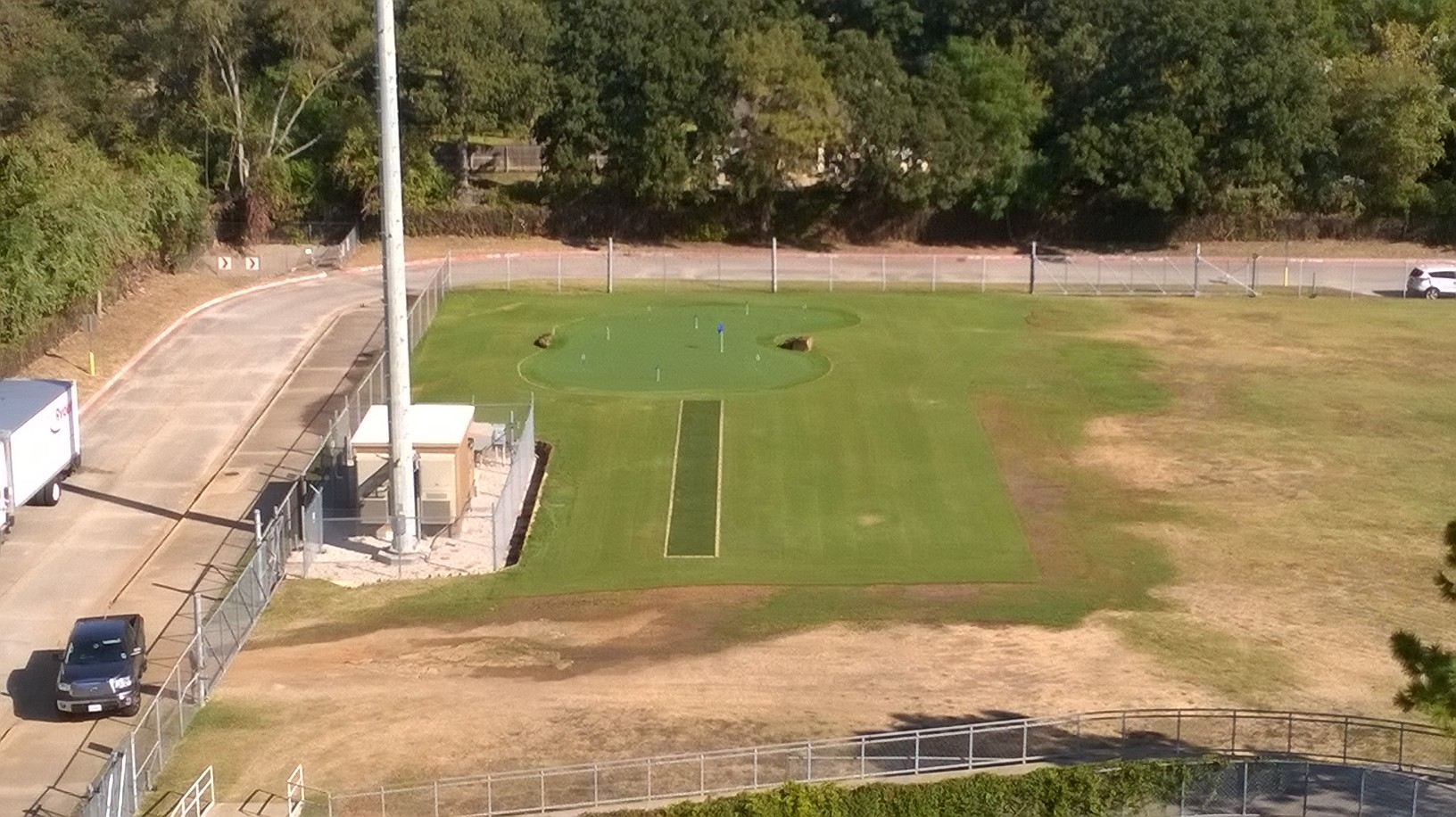
The Mavericks new putting green, just north of the Gilstrap Athletic Center

The locker rooms received their first renovation since construction over the winter break between the fall 2010 and spring 2011 semesters. These included wood-finish lockers replacing the original metal lockers, new paint, fresh carpeting and partitioning of the main locker room between the baseball, softball and men's and women's track and field teams. The university constructed clubhouses at Clay Gould Ballpark for the baseball team and Allan Saxe Field for the softball squad in 2015, so they no longer use Maverick Stadium's facilities and offices. This leaves the university's track and field teams as the only full-time tenants in Maverick Stadium's locker rooms.

In fall 2012, the original public address system installed during the original construction was completely replaced with a new system, providing a clearer sound throughout the stadium.

In fall 2015, the university added a putting green for the UTA golf team in the northwest corner of Maverick Stadium. Another light pole was added to help illuminate that portion of the field. The addition coincided with the announcement that the university would add women's golf to the sport offerings at UTA.

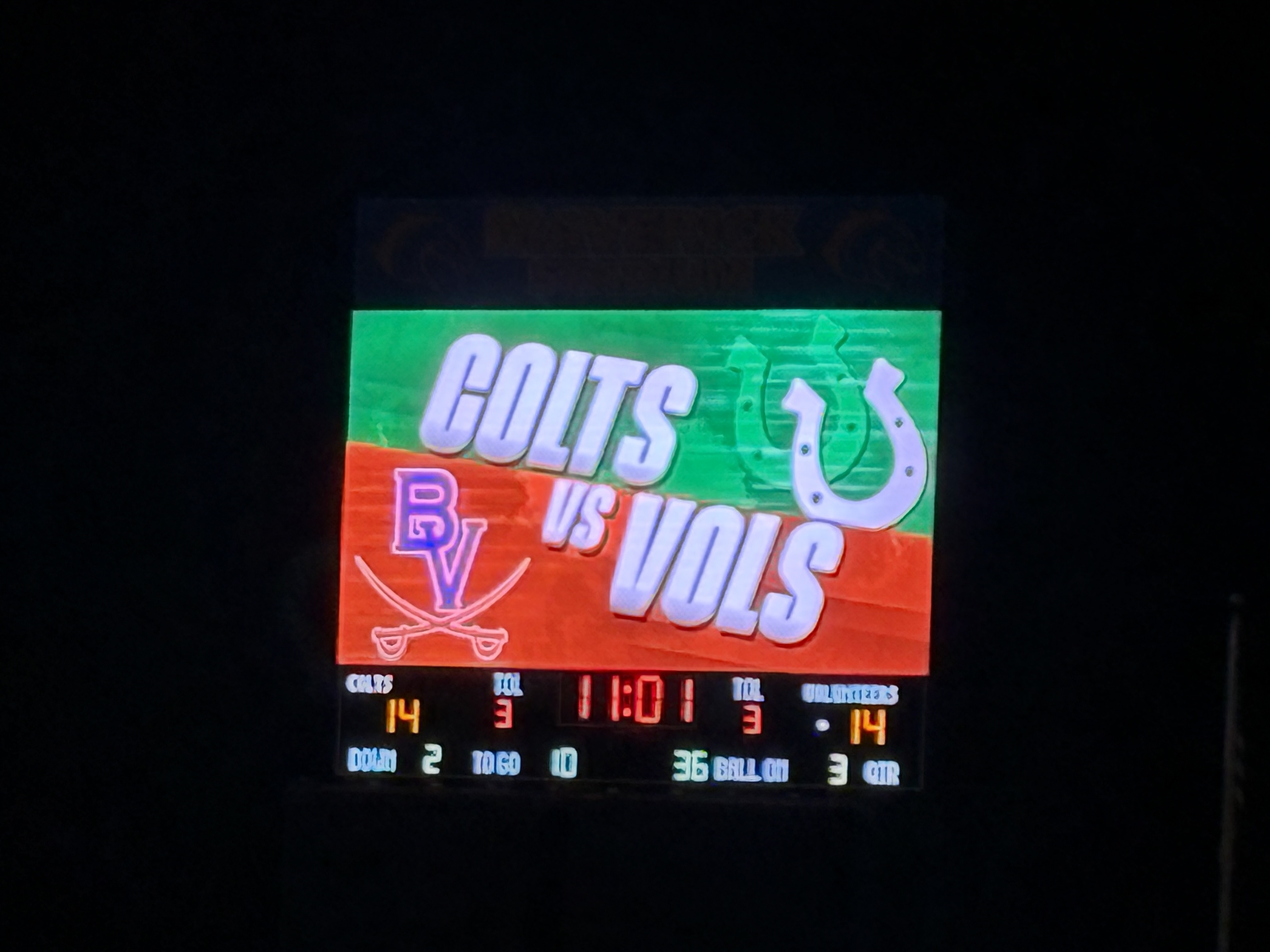
The new video board of Maverick Stadium, as seen during a high school football game on October 17, 2025.

The following year, a $325,000 renovation to the Gilstrap Athletic Center saw the addition of a clubhouse for the golf teams. 2,000 of the 9,000-square-foot facility was devoted to the golf programs, that include lounge and meeting space, a swing analysis system, a hitting area, an indoor putting green, coaches’ offices and outdoor training areas, which include a chipping green and hitting range.

The Center also received a complete overhaul of the entrance, lobby, academic areas, renovated office spaces, meetings areas and lounge space for the Mavericks' men and women’s track teams.

The training room was next up for an upgrade as the facility saw new or replaced cabinets, flooring, lighting, treatment modalities and treatment tables in 2018.

At the start of 2025, UTA completed its roughly decennially resurfacing of the running track. Additionally, the scoreboard was replaced with a videoboard capable of high-definition replays and a ribbon board underneath to keep score.

== Collegiate stadium records, single game ==
Record description	Record	Record holder(s)	Date	Opponent	Final score
Rushing carries	38 car	Shawn Faulkner^	September 9, 1983	Western Michigan	14–21
Rushing yards	202 yds	Burton Murchison^	October 19, 1985	Lamar	37–17
Rushing touchdowns	3 TD's	Wesley Williams^ Randy Johnson	September 9, 1985; October 8, 1983	Angelo State; Wichita State	23–35; 34–24
Completions	27 comp	Fred Hessen^	November 21, 1981	Lamar	31–7
Passing yards	367 yds	Fred Hessen^	November 21, 1981	Lamar	31–7
Passing touchdowns	3 TDs	David Bates	October 19, 1985	Lamar	37–17
Receptions	10 rec	Reuben Eckels^ Marvin Walker^	October 8, 1983; October 9, 1982	Wichita State; North Texas	34–24; 3–17
Receiving yards	180 yds	Keith Arbon	October 19, 1985	Lamar	37–17
Receiving touchdowns	2 TDs	Andre Gray; David Wood^	September 22, 1984; September 8, 1984	Texas State; West Texas A&M	48–13; 27–19
Longest field goal	58 yds	Jeff Heath^	November 6, 1982	East Carolina	24–40
Longest kickoff return	100 yds	Bobby Humphery^	September 12, 1981	New Mexico State	26–13
Most points scored	63	UTA	September 11, 1982	Sam Houston State	63–10

^ Denotes non-UTA player
