= LaMont Jordan =

American football player and coach (born 1978)

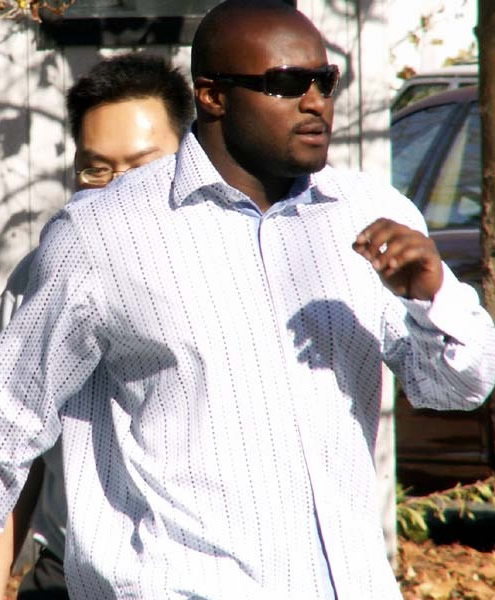
- Jordan in 2007

No. 34, 32
- Position: Running back

Personal information
- Born: November 11, 1978 (age 47); Forestville, Maryland, U.S.
- Listed height: 5 ft 10 in (1.78 m)
- Listed weight: 242 lb (110 kg)

Career information
- High school: Suitland (Suitland, Maryland)
- College: Maryland (1997–2000)
- NFL draft: 2001: 2nd round, 49th overall pick

Career history

Playing
- New York Jets (2001–2004); Oakland Raiders (2005–2007); New England Patriots (2008); Denver Broncos (2009)

Coaching
- San Diego Fleet (2019) Running backs coach; Washington Prodigy (2024–present) Head coach

Awards and highlights
- Second-team All-American (1999); First-team All-ACC (1999); 2× Second-team All-ACC (1998, 2000)

Career NFL statistics
- Rushing attempts: 897
- Rushing yards: 3,734
- Rushing touchdowns: 28
- Receptions: 158
- Receiving yards: 1,301
- Receiving touchdowns: 3
- Stats at Pro Football Reference

LaMont Damon Jordan (born November 11, 1978) is an American former professional football player who was a running back in the National Football League (NFL). He played college football for the Maryland Terrapins and was selected by the New York Jets in the second round of the 2001 NFL draft. Jordan also played in the NFL for the Oakland Raiders, New England Patriots, and Denver Broncos. After his playing career, he was the running backs coach for the San Diego Fleet of the Alliance of American Football (AAF) in 2019.

== Early life ==
Jordan graduated from Suitland High School in 1997. He won many awards in high school, and played football and baseball, and was a member of the school's swimming and track teams.

== College career ==
He attended the University of Maryland, College Park, and as a freshman, gained notice as a first-string player, and finished as runner-up for Rookie of the Year in the Atlantic Coast Conference. As a sophomore, he was named to the second-team All-ACC, and was named by Maryland as the team's most outstanding offensive player. As a junior, he began to gain national notice, and was a semifinalist for the Doak Walker Award. In the same year, he was named to the All-ACC first-team, and surpassed Maryland's single-season rushing record. That season, he gained over six yards per carry, one of only four NCAA players to do so. He was the NCAA rushing leader over the last six games of his junior season. He sat out the drills preceding the 2000 season due to fears of academic ineligibility, and, having a somewhat lackluster senior year, was named to the ACC second-team.

== Professional career ==
=== New York Jets ===
Jordan was drafted in the second round of the 2001 NFL draft with the 49th overall pick by the New York Jets. Jordan spent his first four years as a backup to Curtis Martin before becoming a free agent.

=== Oakland Raiders ===
After the 2004 season, Jordan signed a five-year, $27.5 million contract with the Oakland Raiders. He wore No. 34. Jordan rushed for a career-high 1,025 yards in 2005 while leading all NFL running backs in receptions with 70.

On November 19, 2006, Jordan tore his medial collateral ligament in a game against the Kansas City Chiefs and missed the rest of the season. Jordan started the 2007 season with 350 yards rushing and two touchdowns in the first three games. He injured his back against the Miami Dolphins and was replaced by Justin Fargas. Fargas was productive and was named the starter for the next four games. On July 25, 2008, Jordan was released by the Raiders.

=== New England Patriots ===
On July 26, 2008, Jordan signed a one-year contract with the New England Patriots.

=== Denver Broncos ===
On March 4, 2009, Jordan signed a two-year, $2.5 million contract with the Denver Broncos. The deal included a $500,000 signing bonus. The move reunited him with Broncos head coach Josh McDaniels, who was the Patriots' offensive coordinator in 2008.

Jordan was released on February 23, 2010.

== NFL career statistics ==
Legend
**Bold**	Career high

=== Regular season ===
Year	Team	Games		Rushing					Receiving				
Year	Team	GP	GS	Att	Yds	Avg	Lng	TD	Rec	Yds	Avg	Lng	TD
2001	NYJ	**16**	0	39	292	**7.5**	46	1	7	44	6.3	25	1
2002	NYJ	14	0	84	316	3.8	**61**	3	17	160	**9.4**	27	0
2003	NYJ	**16**	0	46	190	4.1	39	4	11	101	9.2	25	0
2004	NYJ	**16**	0	93	479	5.2	33	2	15	112	7.5	25	0
2005	OAK	14	**14**	**272**	**1,025**	3.8	26	**9**	**70**	**563**	8.0	**28**	**2**
2006	OAK	9	8	114	434	3.8	59	2	10	74	7.4	21	0
2007	OAK	12	7	144	549	3.8	33	3	28	247	8.8	27	0
2008	NE	8	0	80	363	4.5	49	4	0	0	0.0	0	0
2009	DEN	9	0	25	86	3.4	13	0	0	0	0.0	0	0
Total		114	29	897	3,734	4.2	61	28	158	1,301	8.2	28	3

=== Playoffs ===
Year	Team	Games		Rushing					Receiving				
Year	Team	GP	GS	Att	Yds	Avg	Lng	TD	Rec	Yds	Avg	Lng	TD
2001	NYJ	1	0	5	31	6.2	10	0	0	0	0.0	0	0
2002	NYJ	**2**	0	**22**	**105**	4.8	13	**2**	1	9	**9.0**	9	0
2004	NYJ	**2**	0	12	80	**6.7**	**20**	0	**4**	**24**	6.0	**13**	0
Total		5	0	39	216	5.5	20	2	5	33	6.6	13	0

== Coaching career ==
On December 19, 2018, Jordan was named running backs coach for the San Diego Fleet of the Alliance of American Football.

On August 25, 2024, Jordan was named head coach for the Washington Prodigy of the Women's National Football Conference.
