= Jersey Shore Wave =

American football team

- Founded: 2024
- League: Women's National Football Conference
- Based in: Paterson, New Jersey
- Stadium: Hinchliffe Stadium
- CEO: Dawn Sherman
- Head coach: Fabian Alesandro

The Jersey Shore Wave are a women's American football team based in Paterson, New Jersey, that competes in the Women's National Football Conference (WNFC) as a member of the Atlantic Division. The team plays its home games at Hinchliffe Stadium.

== History ==
The team was founded in 2024 and played their first season in 2025.

Season records
Season	W	L	T	Finish	Playoff results
2025	2	4	0		

== 2026 season ==
The team will play six games between March and May 2026.

Game #	Date	Opponent	Home/Away	Result
1	March 28	Florida Avengers	Away	W 13-12
2	April 4	Atlanta Truth	Home	L 50-23
3	April 18	Washington Prodigy	Home	L 59-20
4	May 2	Atlanta Truth	Away	L 0-20
5	May 9	Washington Prodigy	Away	L 0-57
6	May 16	Chicago Winds	Home	L 37-0
