= Hinchliffe Stadium =

Stadium in New Jersey

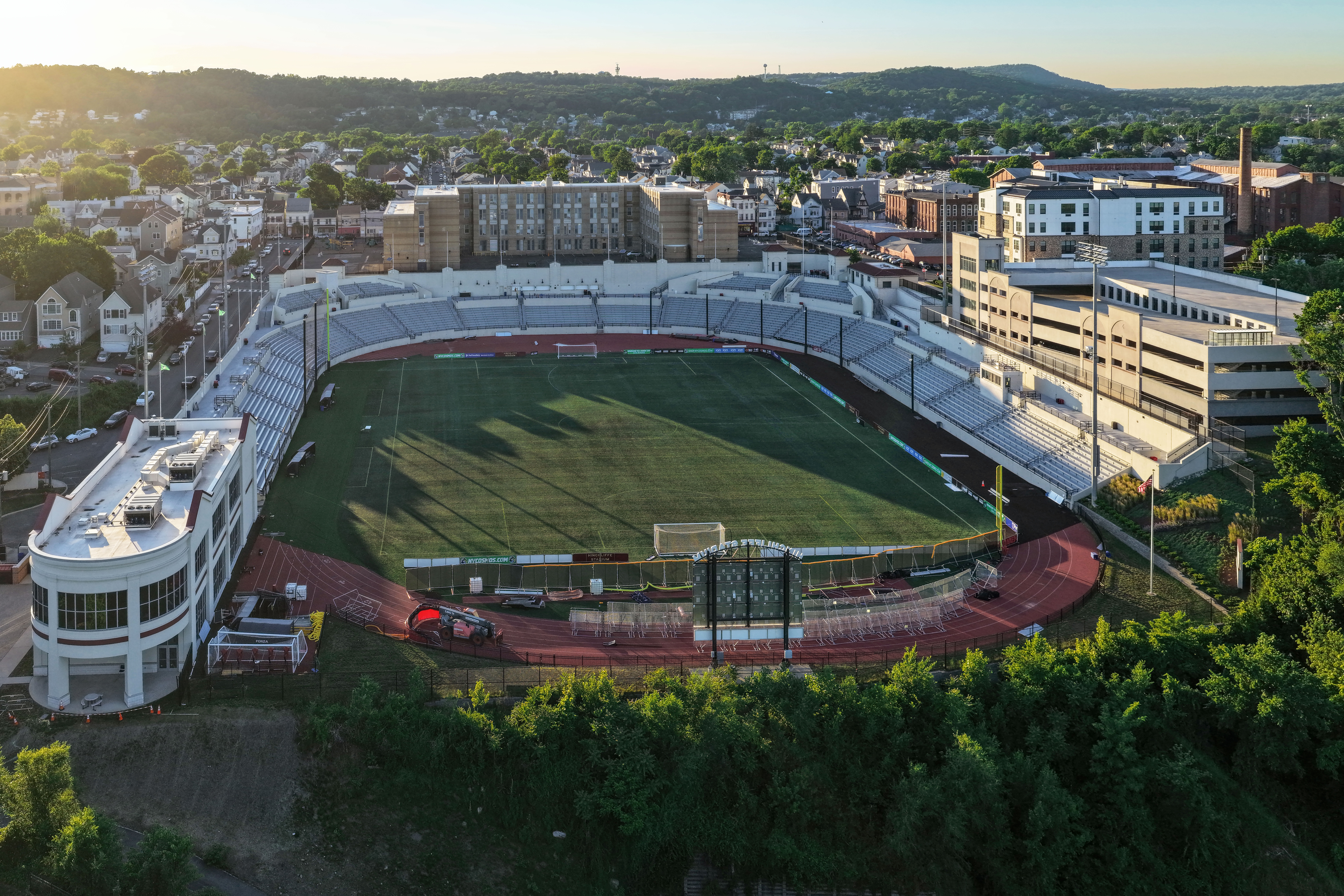
- The stadium as seen in June 2026

- Location within New Jersey Location within the United States
- Interactive map of Hinchliffe Stadium
- Former names: City Stadium
- Address: Maple and Liberty Streets; Paterson, New Jersey
- Coordinates: 40°55′6″N 74°10′52″W
- Owner: Paterson Board of Education
- Operator: New Jersey Jackals New York Cosmos
- Capacity: 10,000 (1932–present)
- Surface: Various
- Field size: Left field: 320 ft (98 m); Center field: 461 ft (141 m); Right field: 327 ft (100 m)
- Acreage: 5.7 acres (2.3 ha)
- Current use: Baseball; Soccer; American football
- Public transit: New Jersey Transit Paterson station

Construction
- Built: 1931–1932
- Opened: July 8, 1932; 94 years ago
- Renovated: 1963–1964, 1983, 2021–2022
- Closed: 1997
- Reopened: May 19, 2023
- Architect: Olmsted Brothers

Tenants
- Paterson Giants (IFL) 1932–1933; Paterson Night Hawks (I) 1932–1933; Silk City Bears (I) 1932; New York Black Yankees (NNL II); 1933–1935, 1937–1938; New York Cubans (NNL II) 1935–1936; Paterson Panthers (AA); 1936–1941, 1946–1950; New Jersey Jackals (NAPB) 2023–present New York Cosmos (USL1) 2026–present Jersey Shore Wave (WNFC) 2025–present

Website
- hinchliffestadium.com
- Hinchliffe Stadium
- U.S. National Register of Historic Places
- U.S. National Historic Landmark
- New Jersey Register of Historic Places
- Architectural style: Art Deco with Mission style elements
- NRHP reference No.: 04000223
- NJRHP No.: 4234

Significant dates
- Added to NRHP: March 22, 2004
- Designated NHL: March 11, 2013
- Designated NJRHP: January 27, 2004

Hinchliffe Stadium is a 10,000-seat stadium located in Paterson, New Jersey. The stadium is located atop the Great Falls of the Passaic River, and is part of the surrounding National Historical Park.

The stadium, built in 1932, was closed in 1996 after years of neglect, but reopened in 2023, and is currently home to the National Association of Professional Baseball's New Jersey Jackals and USL League One's New York Cosmos. The stadium's primary user is the Paterson Board of Education, where it serves as a multipurpose facility for the city's two high schools, Eastside High School and Kennedy High School, primarily hosting their football home games, along with their annual game on Thanksgiving Day.

Hinchliffe Stadium was also used as the home of the New York Black Yankees and New York Cubans of the Negro leagues, and is one of four stadia still standing that hosted Negro league baseball games.

== History ==
=== Early years ===
The stadium, a large concrete oval with near-continuous seating laid out like a classical amphitheater, was inspired by a decade-long popular "stadium movement" in the 1920s, and was finally brought to fruition through the persistent efforts of its namesake Mayor John Hinchliffe, who made his fortune from Hinchliffe Brewing before it closed due to Prohibition. It opened on July 8, 1932, as a combination athletic facility and a "paying investment" for the working people of industrial Paterson, New Jersey, who were by then struggling through the early years of the Great Depression. Many workers laid off from the mills found work under a New Deal-financed program to provide enhancements to the stadium in 1932–34.

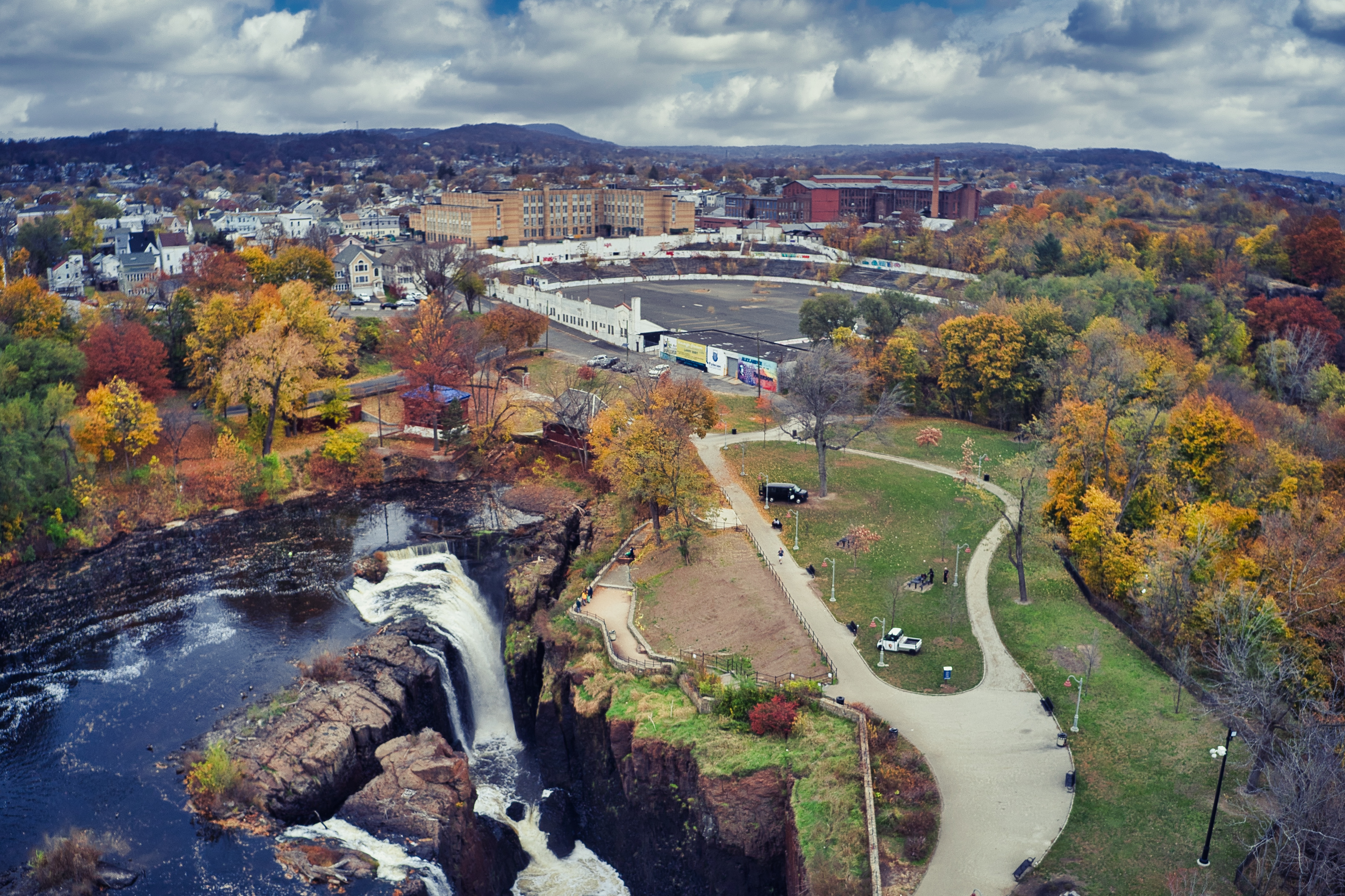
Aerial photo of Hinchliffe Stadium with Great Falls in foreground

The stadium immediately played host to the Negro National League and "barnstorming" games. In 1933, the stadium's first complete season hosting baseball, Hinchliffe hosted the Colored Championship of the Nation, the Negro leagues equivalent of the World Series, between the New York Black Yankees and Philadelphia Stars. That same year, the New York Black Yankees made the stadium their home, a tenure that lasted until 1938 and was interrupted only once in the 1936 season when they split time between Freeport and Middletown, New York. After 1939, the Black Yankees left Hinchliffe and took up residency at Yankee Stadium in the Bronx, New York. Hinchliffe was also home to the New York Cubans in 1935 and 1936.

Hinchliffe Stadium hosted high-level baseball games featuring many prominent athletes. Players who competed there included athletes like Monte Irvin, Josh Gibson, Oscar Charleston, and "Cool Papa" Bell. Hall-of-Famer Larry Doby, who broke the American League color barrier in 1947, grew up in Paterson playing football and baseball in Hinchliffe Stadium for Paterson's Eastside High School, and was scouted from Hinchliffe for the Newark Eagles in 1942.

Hinchliffe became an important venue for boxing (Diamond Gloves, precursor to the Golden Gloves), auto racing (precursor to NASCAR featuring stock car racing, pre-Indianapolis racing, and midget car racing events), and professional football. Racers who appeared at Hinchliffe included Dutch Schaefer, Ted Horn, Bill Schindler, Art Cross, and Tex Keene. Victory Bond rallies held at the stadium during World War II drew sports stars and New York and Hollywood celebrities by the dozens. Among the many notable events headlined at Hinchliffe were comedy shows performed by Abbott and Costello. (Costello was born and raised in Paterson's Eastside section.)

Throughout its history, though, Hinchliffe Stadium's primary use was as a venue for Paterson high school sports. Its two high schools, Eastside High School and Central High School, shared the stadium for various sports including football and baseball until the late 1960s. (Kennedy High School, opened in 1965, also used Hinchliffe.) The schools' annual intracity Thanksgiving Day matchup was always held at Hinchliffe (that tradition would return when the stadium officially reopened in 2023), and the venue would also play host to other local schools' teams to take advantage of its larger capacity; for instance, Paterson's neighbor Clifton used the stadium for football during the 1940s until opening its own stadium October 14, 1950.

=== Later years, closing and preservation efforts ===
At first Hinchliffe, sometimes called "City Stadium", was municipally owned. In 1963, as the schools assumed full ownership, they undertook an array of repairs and upgrades that included repositioning the baseball diamond and adding fill to the area above and along the river (the "cliff" area, called "The Valley of the Rocks") in order to enlarge the football field and lengthen the track. In the following decades, the stadium did yeoman service for both school sports and major public events, including—from the 1970s on—concerts, antique car shows, and the fireworks displays for the Great Falls Festivals that have become a favorite feature of Paterson's Labor Day celebrations. Duke Ellington held one of his last major concerts here in 1971.

In 1983, the field received another upgrade under Mayor Frank X. Graves, Jr. These repairs made previously temporary stands permanent, added handicap access and storage facilities, and resulted in the installation of an Astroturf field surface. In 1988 Hinchliffe Stadium became the home of the New Jersey Eagles of the American Soccer League, and the Eagles called the stadium home for two seasons before moving to another venue for their third and final season.

The general decline of the school system in Paterson over the next decade meant the diversion of maintenance resources away from the stadium. Although the facility continued to be used through the 1990s, Hinchliffe Stadium fell further into disrepair due to underfunding and was eventually closed at the end of the 1996–97 school year and threatened with demolition. This forced Eastside High School and Kennedy High School to play their entire 1997 football seasons on the road, and both schools returned to playing in Paterson for the 1998 season at Bauerle Field, located near Eastside High School.

The threat of demolition sparked a new movement to find ways and means of restoring and revitalizing this historic venue. A group of local citizens formed the non-profit Friends of Hinchliffe Stadium, announcing in September 2002, on the 70th anniversary of the stadium's dedication. A month later, Schools Superintendent Edwin Duroy announced a proposal to revitalize the facility into a stadium complex. The National Register of Historic Places designation by the State Office of Historic Preservation deemed Hinchliffe as only "locally significant", even though segregation and the Negro leagues were of national prominence. This cost the stadium much-needed funding from the Save America's Treasures grant funding program.

=== Stadium renovation ===
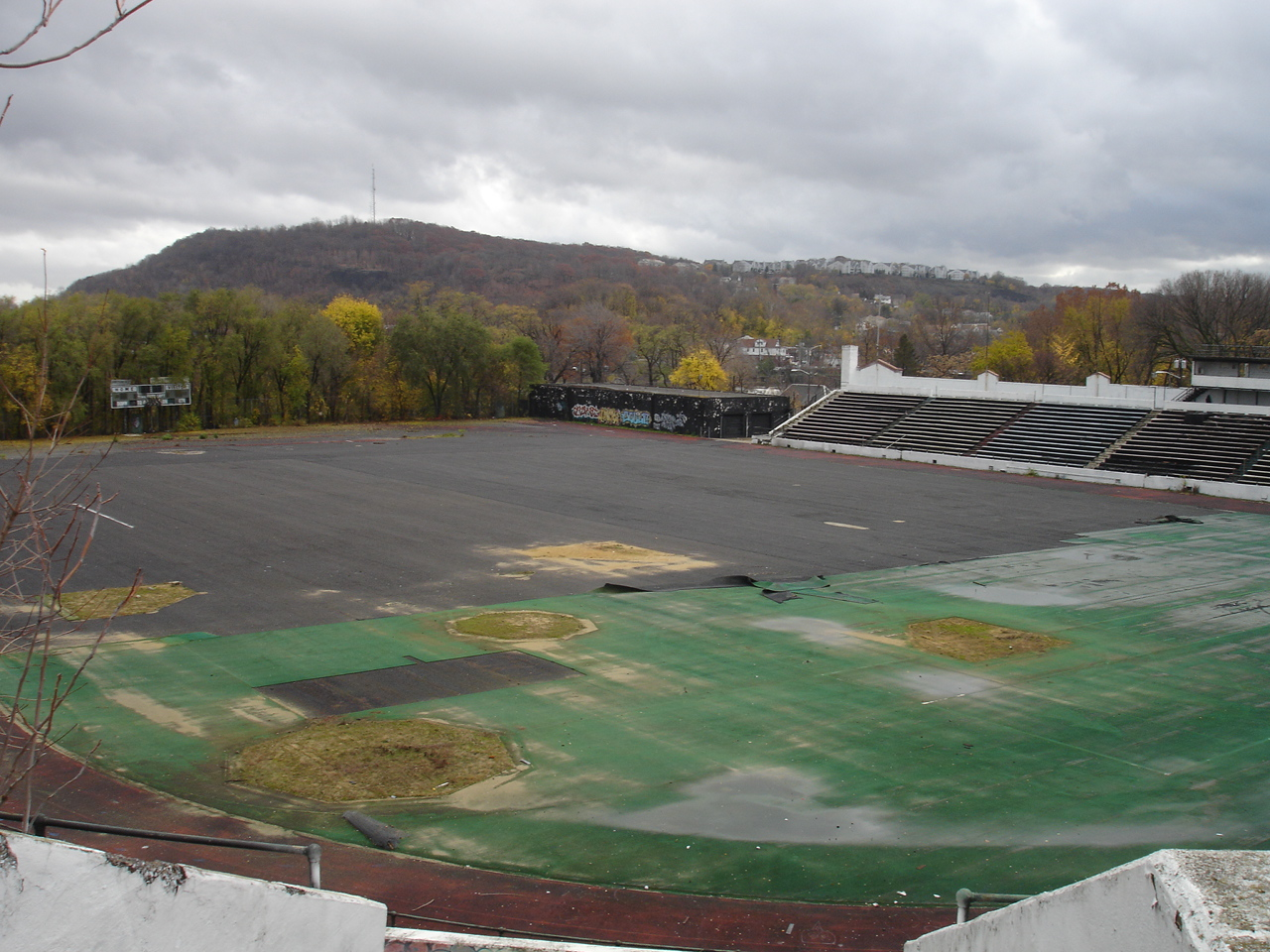
Hinchliffe Stadium before renovation.

In 2009, efforts to renovate Hinchliffe began in earnest when Paterson city councilor Andre Sayegh visited Rickwood Field in Birmingham, Alabama, one of the few remaining Negro league stadiums still standing. Sayegh believed that Hinchliffe could be restored, and vowed to himself that if he was elected mayor, he would lead the effort to do so.

Elected mayor in 2018, Sayegh secured the necessary political support and funding for the renovation, and in 2021, ground was broken on a $94 million project to both restore and upgrade the stadium; in the months following the groundbreaking ceremony, extensive cleanup and other repair efforts were undertaken in order to restore the long-neglected, and practically abandoned, stadium grounds. Funding for the project was dependent on the return of a professional baseball team, a condition that was met when the New Jersey Jackals announced they would be moving from Yogi Berra Stadium in Little Falls, New Jersey in 2023 to play at Hinchliffe Stadium.

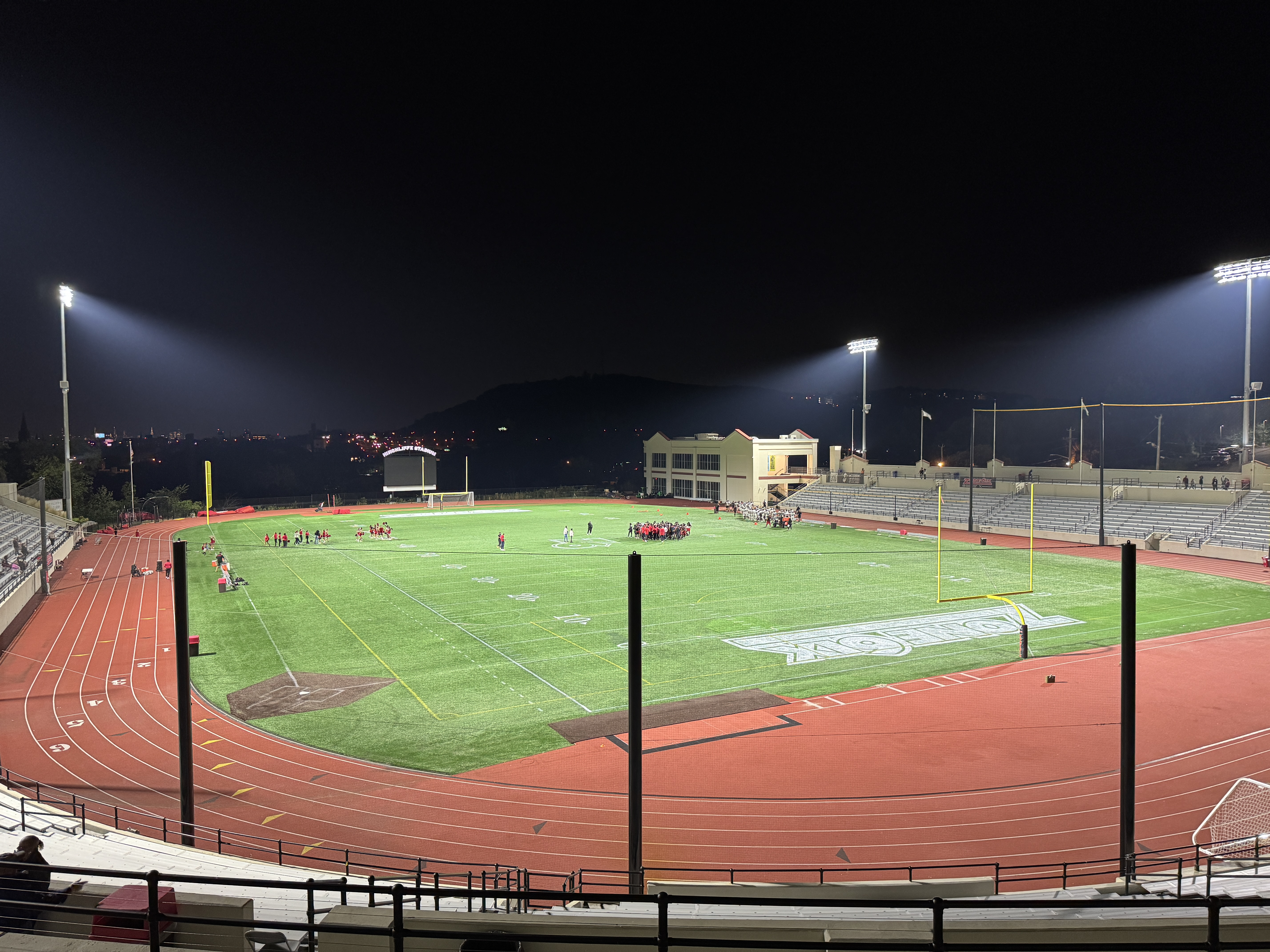
The stadium in 2024

The stadium had a soft opening on May 17, 2023, that featured a high school softball game, as well as a baseball game between Paterson's Eastside High School and Don Bosco Prep. Hinchliffe's grand opening occurred on May 19, 2023, and was attended by numerous celebrities, including Whoopi Goldberg and New Jersey Senator Cory Booker. Goldberg told the media that preserving the stadium was essential to preserving American history, saying "Anything that's happened in this country should never be erased from books of any kind because we need to know, we need to remember. Little kids need to know, and they need to understand. There's not a color in this country that doesn't participate in our collective history." Other notables in attendance included Executive Director of the MLB Players Association Tony Clark, former baseball team manager Joe Maddon, and MLB Network insider Tom Verducci.

During the opening ceremonies, Sayegh said that he and former professional baseball player Harold Reynolds had spoken to MLB Commissioner Rob Manfred about hosting an annual major league baseball game at the stadium as a means of honoring the Negro leagues.

The Jackals played their first game at the stadium on May 21, 2023, against the Sussex County Miners. 400 people attended the game and saw the Jackals defeat the Miners 10–6.

Critics of the stadium renovation included Jackal fans who questioned the decision moving the team to an area with significant crime and transportation issues. Jackals owner Al Dorso, who agreed to lease the stadium from the city annually for 180 days, was also criticized by community leaders for placing profits over the needs of local residents.

=== Cosmos soccer ===
In February 2025, the group behind a northern New Jersey-based expansion franchise in the United Soccer League's League One announced that they would play at Hinchliffe Stadium starting in 2026. This team was eventually announced as the third official edition of the New York Cosmos in July 2025. The Cosmos played their first game at Hinchliffe Stadium on March 14, 2026, losing to visiting Portland Hearts of Pine 3−1.

== See also ==
- Paterson Public Schools
- Paterson Great Falls National Historical Park
- Ruppert Stadium (Newark)
- Olmsted Brothers – Architects for Hinchliffe Stadium

Some Negro league ballparks that are still standing or rebuilt elsewhere include:

- Josh Gibson Field in Pittsburgh, Pennsylvania is still standing and was renovated in 2008.
- McCormick Field in Asheville, North Carolina was originally built in 1924 then used in the 1940s by the Asheville Blues. It was rebuilt in 1992 is used as a ballpark by the Tourists.
- Rickwood Field in Birmingham, Alabama is still standing and is an active sports venue and museum.
