= Perspectives Charter Schools =

School network in Illinois, United States

Location
- 1530 South State Street; Chicago, Illinois 60605; United States

Information
- Type: Charter school
- Established: 1997
- Founder: Kim Day & Diana Shulla-Cose
- Principal: Tyneisha Banks (Perspectives IT/ Math & Science Academy); Eron Powell (Perspectives High School of Technology); Doriene Canada-Pendleton (Perspectives Joslin Campus); Jasmine Morales (Perspective Middle Academy)
- Grades: 6–12
- Gender: Co-Educational
- Campus: Urban
- Colors: Maroon & Blue Navy & White (Joslin campus)
- Athletics conference: Chicago Public League
- Sports: baseball, basketball, cheerleading, football, soccer, softball, track, volleyball, wrestling
- Nickname: Warriors/Panthers
- Website: Official site

Perspectives Charter Schools is a charter school network in Chicago, Illinois. The organization was founded by Kim Day and Diana Shulla-Cose, two teachers at Chicago's Dyett Middle School.

== History ==
In 1993, Day and Shulla-Cose established their own small school within Dyett. They chose the name "Perspectives" to reflect their hope of changing the way their students saw themselves and the world. In 1997, Perspectives became one of the first charter schools in Illinois.

== Campuses ==
The school moved several times over the years and was expanded into a network of schools, serving both elementary and high school students. The five current Perspectives schools are as follows:

- The Rodney D. Joslin Campus, which is housed in a building designed by Perkins+Will
- Perspectives Middle Academy
- Perspectives High School of Technology
- Perspectives Leadership Academy
- Perspectives/IIT Math & Science Academy

== Athletics ==
Professional basketball player Anthony Davis attended the Joslin campus.
