= Rossview High School =

Rossview High
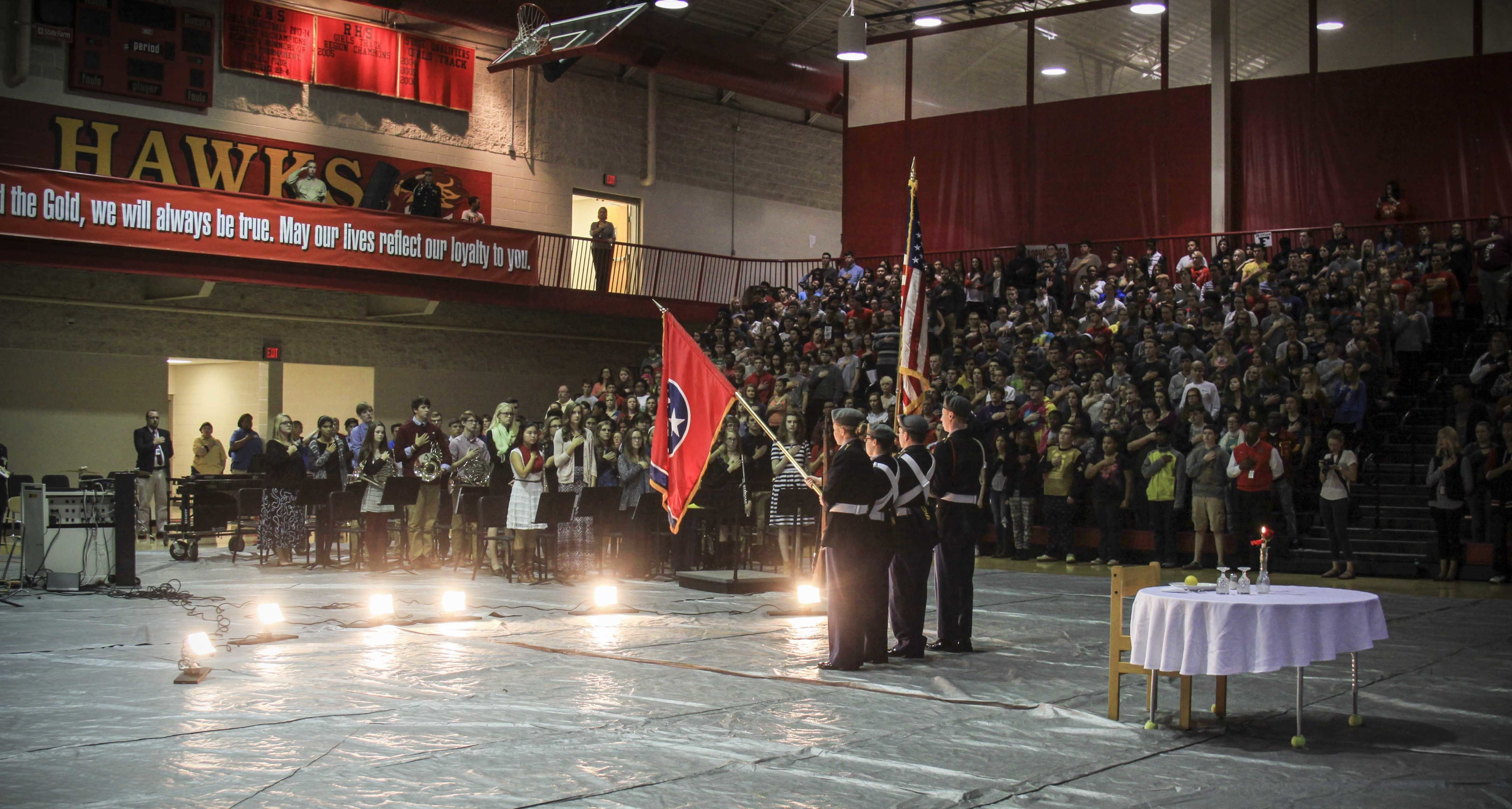
- Veterans Day ceremony at Rossview High

Location
- 1237 Rossview Rd; Clarksville, TN, 37043; USA
- Coordinates: 36.55809°N 87.25566°W

Information
- Type: Public
- Founded: 2001
- Principal: Meghen Sanders
- Grades: 9-12
- Enrollment: 1,539 (2023-24)
- Student to teacher ratio: 17:1
- Colors: Red and gold
- Athletics: TSSAA Class 5A Football, Class AAA other sports.
- Team name: Hawks
- Website: https://rossviewhigh.cmcss.net/

Rossview High School is a high school located in Clarksville, Tennessee. It is part of the Clarksville-Montgomery County School System. The current building was completed in 2001 for $28 million. The school's mascot is Squawk The Hawk, and the school's colors are red and gold, though many sports teams prefer the more 'stylish' black and red. A special tutoring and peer advising program was implemented after "inadequate performance" in the 2003 No Child Left Behind tests, which helped to bring the school up to all federal benchmarks by 2005. The school far exceeds state achievement score averages for each grade for Reading/Language arts as well as for Math.

== Academics and ratings ==
Rossview High School consistently performs above the state average in standardized testing. The school is ranked among the top 30% of public schools in Tennessee. According to SchoolDigger’s 2025 statewide rankings, Rossview was ranked 42nd out of 389 Tennessee high schools, maintaining a 4-star rating. It holds a GreatSchools rating of 8 out of 10. Niche assigns the school an overall grade of A−, with a reported graduation rate of 92%. The average ACT score for the school in 2025 was 20.6.

== Demographics ==
In the 2024–2025 school year, Rossview High School had a total enrollment of 1,529 students. The demographic breakdown was as follows:

- 50.6% White
- 19.9% Black
- 14.7% Hispanic
- 10.1% Two or more races
- 4.0% Asian
- 0.7% Native American/Native Hawaiian/Pacific Islander

== Athletics ==
Rossview High School has won a total of five state championships since opening in 2001. Individual state championships have been earned in Wrestling, track and field, and girls Golf, according to Tennessee Secondary School Athletic Association (TSSAA) records. Girls golf has also captured two team state championships.

Several Rossview athletic programs have earned district titles, including boys and girls varsity tennis and boys baseball. The boys baseball program has won seven district championships, with its most recent district title coming in 2015 under first-year head coach Parker Holman. The team was also crowned the Region 5-AAA champions in 2014 under head coach Jason Rice and has made ten playoff appearances in program history.

Rossview’s football program has also experienced competitive success. Under head coach Ronald Lambert, the team finished second in district play during both the 2013 and 2014 seasons and has made multiple playoff appearances since the school opened in 2001, as documented by local sports coverage.
