= Utah Falconz =

American football team

- Founded: 2013
- League: WNFC
- Division: Northwestern
- Based in: Salt Lake City, Utah
- Home ground: Judge Memorial Catholic High School
- Colors: Blue and white
- Head coach: Rick Rasmussen
- Championships: 2016, 2017
- Conference titles: 2015, 2016, 2017, 2018, 2019, 2022

The Utah Falconz are a women's American football team based in Salt Lake City, Utah, that competes in the Women's National Football Conference (WNFC) as a member of the Northwest Division. The team plays its home games at Judge Memorial Catholic High School. The current head coach is Rick Rasmussen.

== History ==
The team was founded in 2013 by Hiroko Jolley who invested $40,000 of her own money into the project.

== Controversy ==
In 2024 a Falconz assistant coach was charged with raping a player.

== Championships ==
The Utah Falconz have been in the championship game for the past three years of the Independent Women's Football League, losing 41–37 to the Pittsburgh Passion in 2015, and winning back-to-back titles in 2016 and 2017.

== Season results ==
=== 2017 ===
Date	Opponent	Home/Away	Result	Game #
April 8	Phoenix Phantomz	Away	Win 57–0	1
April 15	Sacramento Sirens	Home	Win 38–0	2
April 29	Nevada Storm	Away	Win 40–0	3
May 6	Carson Bobcats	Home	Win 47–6	4
May 13	Sacramento Sirens	Away	Win 48–2	5
May 27	Phoenix Phantomz	Home	Win 30–0	6
June 3	North County Starz	Away	Win 58–0	7
June 10	Nevada Storm	Home	Win 48–0	8
June 24	Carson Bobcats	Home	Win 26–0	Playoff Game 1
July 8	Sacramento Sirens	Home	Win 51–7	Conference Title
July 22	Austin Yellow Jackets	Home	Win 35–18	Championship

=== 2014 ===
Date	Opponent	Home/Away	Result	Game #
March 22	Everett Reign	Away	Win 52–0	1
March 29	Utah Blitz	Home	Win 59–0	2
April 5	Thunder Katz	Away	Win 58–0	3
April 12	Mile High Blaze	Home	Win 64–0	4
April 19	BYE			5
April 26	BYE			6
May 3	Mile High Blaze	Away	Win 55–17	7
May 10	Seattle Majestics	Home	Win 39–20	8
May 17	BYE			
May 24	Tacoma Trauma	Away	Win 72–0	
May 31	Thunder Katz	Home	Win 63–0	

== See also ==
- Women's gridiron football
- List of female American football teams
- Women's football in the United States
