= Score (sport) =

Quantitative measure of performance in sport

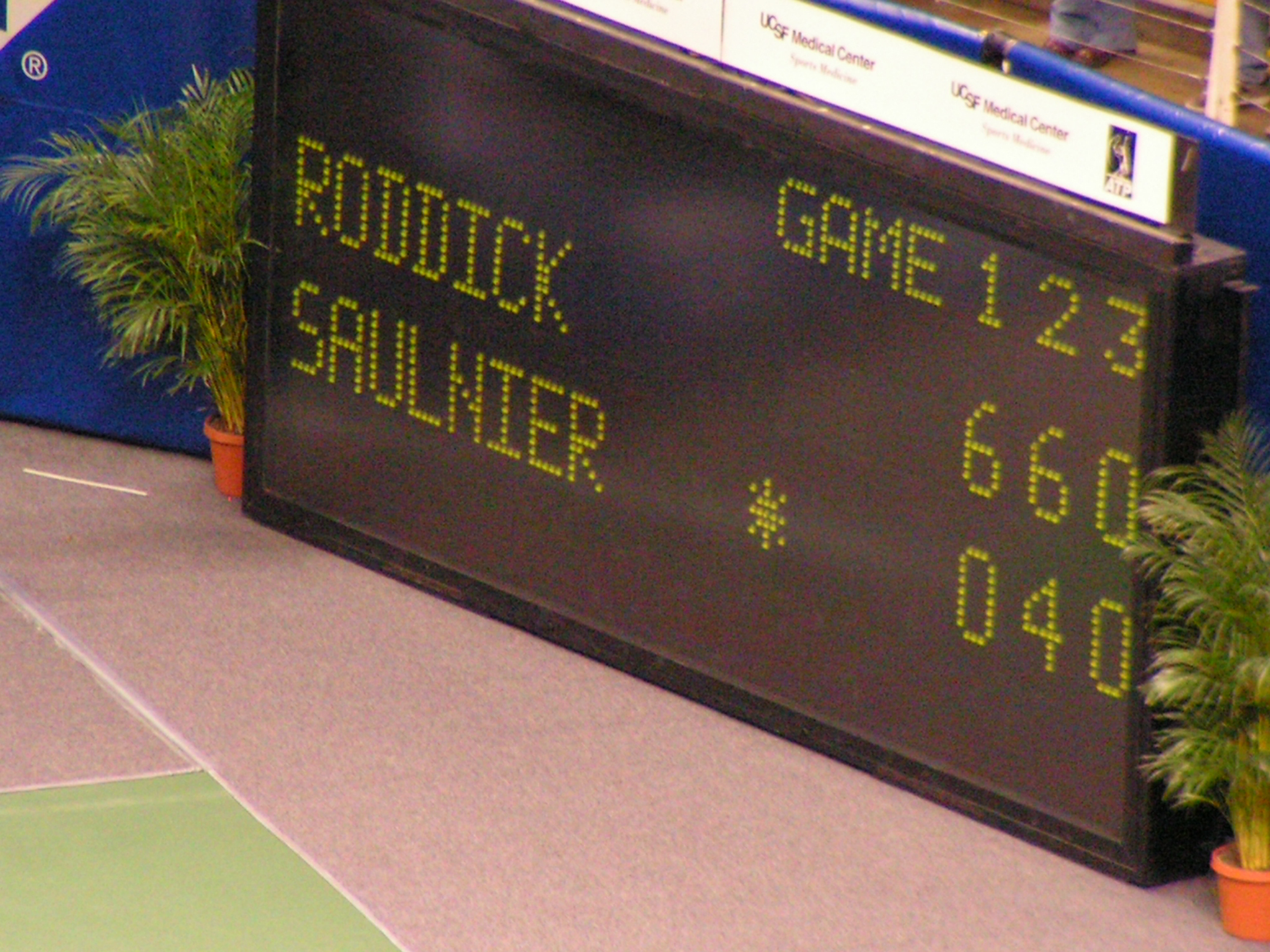
A tennis scoreboard. Cyril Saulnier has lost the first two sets.

In sport, score is a quantitative measure of the relative performance of opponents in a sporting discipline. Score is normally measured in the abstract unit of points, and events in the competition can raise or lower the score of the involved parties. Most games with score use it as a quantitative indicator of success in the game, and in competition, a goal is often made of attaining a better score than one's opponents in order to win.

In team sport, the most common point metric is the "goal" or "score". Goals are accrued by the respective teams, and the match score represents the total score accrued by each team. For example, in association football and hockey goals are achieved by putting the ball in the opposing team's net. Other team sports like rugby, baseball and cricket have more complicated scoring procedures. The winning team is that which has recorded the best score, usually the team with the higher total score; a draw or tie is a result in which the competing teams record an equal score, sometimes requiring a tiebreaker.

Individual-based sports, such as golf and tennis, have points-based scoring as well. These may be abstract quantities defined for the sport, or more natural measures such as a distance or duration. Each competing athlete accrues points based on the sport's scoring system, and the athlete with the best score is deemed the winner. In some sports, the best score is that of the competitor with the highest score, such as in tennis or high jump. In other sports, the best score is that of the competitor with the lowest score, such as in golf or the 100 metres sprint.

Most sports have time limits, which means point-based victories are usually the result of obtaining more points than one's opponent. In others, the winner must achieve a fixed number of points sooner than the rival. In some sports there is a perfect score that is the highest attainable, such as a 6.0 or 10.0. In boxing and mixed martial arts, a match runs an agreed number of timed rounds, each scored at its conclusion with a mandatory 10 points for winning and 9 or fewer for losing, depending on relative inefficiency. If either player scores a knockout or submission, they immediately win the match regardless of points or time.

== Live scores ==
Live scores is a type of service offered by many sports-related websites and broadcasters as well as online sports betting operators. The idea of live scores is to provide real time information about sports results from various disciplines. Live scores are usually free and are very popular among sports betting enthusiasts, as they allow viewing collected data on many sports events. In the past, live score services were only available on TV through teletext or on the radio. There are now many websites providing live scores. It is possible to follow live results of many events at the same time. Some sites provide additional information, such as a player list, card details, substitution and an online chat where sports fans can gather and discuss the current event. Several sports organizations such Major league baseball and the National Football League have set up their own networks to deliver live scores via mobile phones.

== Scoring by sport ==
Each sport has a system by which scoring is determined and tracked. Types of scoring include; time duration, physical measurement such as distance, faults made, or rallies won. A combination of these factors might also be used.

Sports that use duration include many disciplines in athletics (track events of track and field, road running, cross country running and racewalking), and skiing (alpine skiing and cross-country skiing). Duration scoring may also incorporate penalty time based on the events of the competition. For example, in biathlon an athlete is made to ski a penalty loop for each target missed in the target-shooting portion of the event, causing an increase in the athlete's elapsed time in the competition. In the equestrian discipline of show jumping, the duration of the performance is complemented with faults which are assessed for exceeding a maximum allowable time for the event (time fault), or if the horse refuses to jump over an obstacle or knocks down a rail of an obstacle.

Examples of sports using a physical measurement, such as distance or height, include; the athletics disciplines of shot put, discus throw, hammer throw, javelin throw, long jump, triple jump, high jump, and pole vault.

In most racket sports and net sports a point is earned when the other team commits a fault or rule infraction, thereby awarding the rally to the opposing team or player. Such sports may apply rally scoring, in which case either team can earn a point regardless of who is serving, or they may apply side-out scoring where only the serving team can earn a point. Pickleball utilizes side-out scoring, but Tennis utilizes rally scoring with specialized rules for tracking the score.

Sport	Type	Score system	Draws
Athletics
Throwing
Discus, hammer, javelin, shot put	Individual	Distance (length)	
Running
Running; Track (sprint, middle and long distance); obstacle (hurdles, steeplechase); road (long distance, marathon, race walking)	Individual	Duration	
Cross country running	Individual or team	Duration	
Running relay Track relay (4 × 100 m, 4 × 200 m, 4 × 400 m, 4 × 800 m); medley (sprint, distance); Swedish relay; Ekiden	Team	Duration	
Jumping
High jump	Individual	Distance (height)	Possible
Long jump Running and standing long jump; running and standing triple jump	Individual	Distance (length)	
Pole vault	Individual	Distance (height)	
Combined
Decathlon, heptathlon, and pentathlon	Individual	Points (based on event distance or duration)	
Goal sports
Basketball	Team	Points	
Netball	Team	Goals	
Camogie	Team	Points (goals)	
Hurling	Team	Points (goals)	
Handball	Team	Goals	
Lacrosse (field, box, sixes)	Team	Goals	
Polo	Team	Goals	
Ultimate	Team	Points	
Water polo	Team	Goals	
Football codes			
Association football	Team	Goals	Allowed
Australian rules football	Team	Points (goals, behinds)	Allowed
Gaelic football	Team	Points (goals)	
Gridiron football (American, Canadian)	Team	Points	Possible depending on sanctioning body/level
Rugby league	Team	Points	Allowed
Rugby union	Team	Points	Allowed
Hockey			
Field hockey	Team	Goals	
Ice hockey	Team	Goals	
Bat and ball sports
Baseball	Team	Runs	Not allowed in most leagues
Softball	Team	Runs	
Cricket	Team	Runs	Possible
Oină	Team	Points	
Rounders	Team	Rounders	
Net and wall sports
Fistball	Team	Points and sets	
Volleyball	Team	Points and sets, rally scoring	Not possible
Racquet sports
Badminton	Individual or Doubles	Points and games, rally scoring	Not possible
Pickleball	Individual or Doubles	Points and games, side-out scoring	Not possible
Racquetball	Individual or Doubles	Points and games, side-out scoring	Not possible
Squash	Individual	Points and games, rally scoring	Not possible
Table tennis	Individual or Doubles	Points and games, rally scoring	Not possible
Tennis	Individual or Doubles	Points, games, and sets, rally scoring	Not possible
Other ball sports
Golf	Individual	Par (score)	
Bocce	Team	Points	
Bowling (five-, nine- and ten-pin, candlepin, duckpin)	Individual	Points	
Tag sports
Atya patya	Team	Points	
Kabaddi	Team	Points	
Kho kho	Team	Points (tiebreaker based on duration)	
World Chase Tag	Team	Points (tiebreaker based on duration)	
Other sports
Auto racing	Individual or team	Points (some based on duration)	
Boxing	Individual	Points (if time expires)	
Curling	Team	Points	
Fencing	Individual or team	Touches	
Roller derby	Team	Points	
