= Sports in the United States by state =

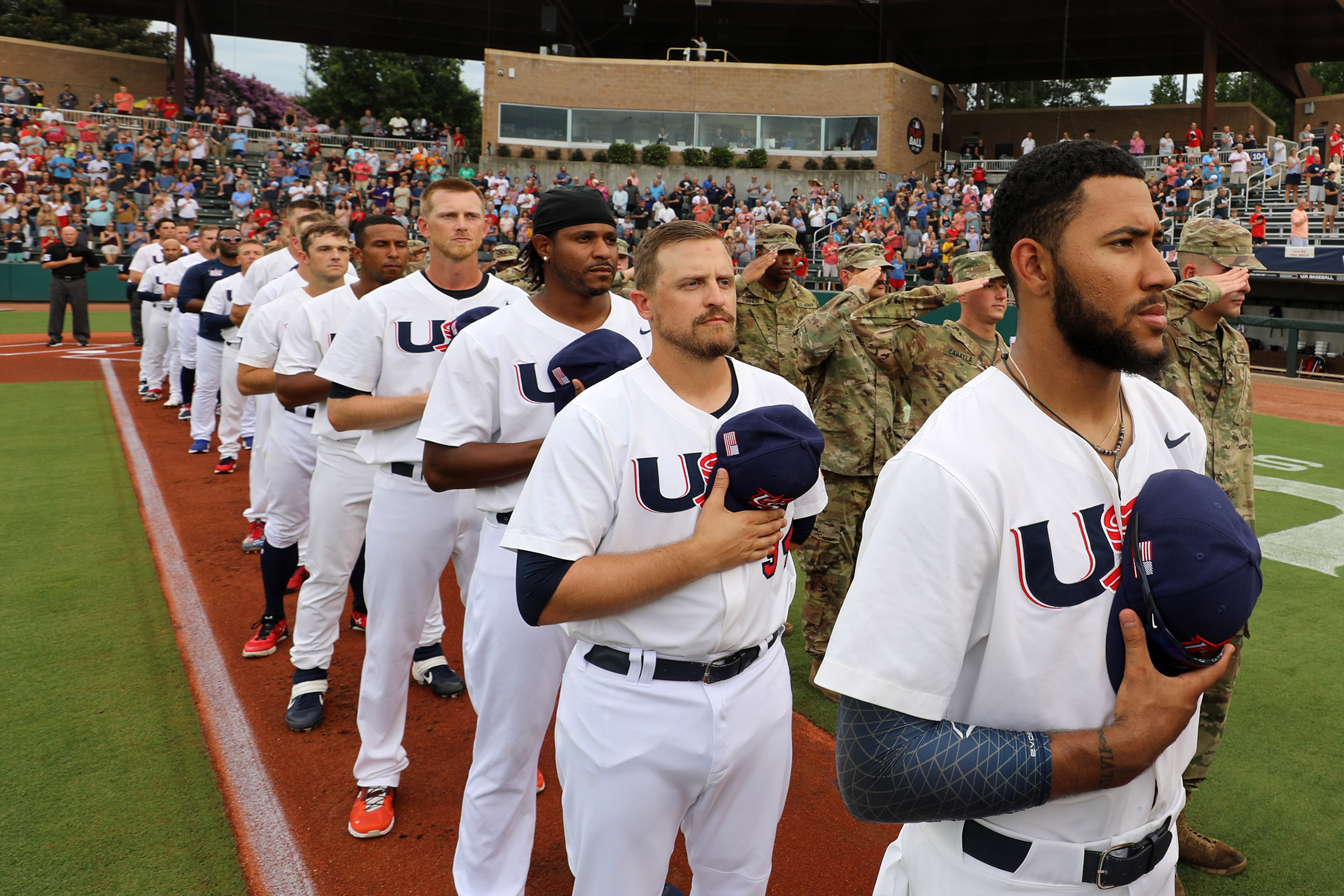
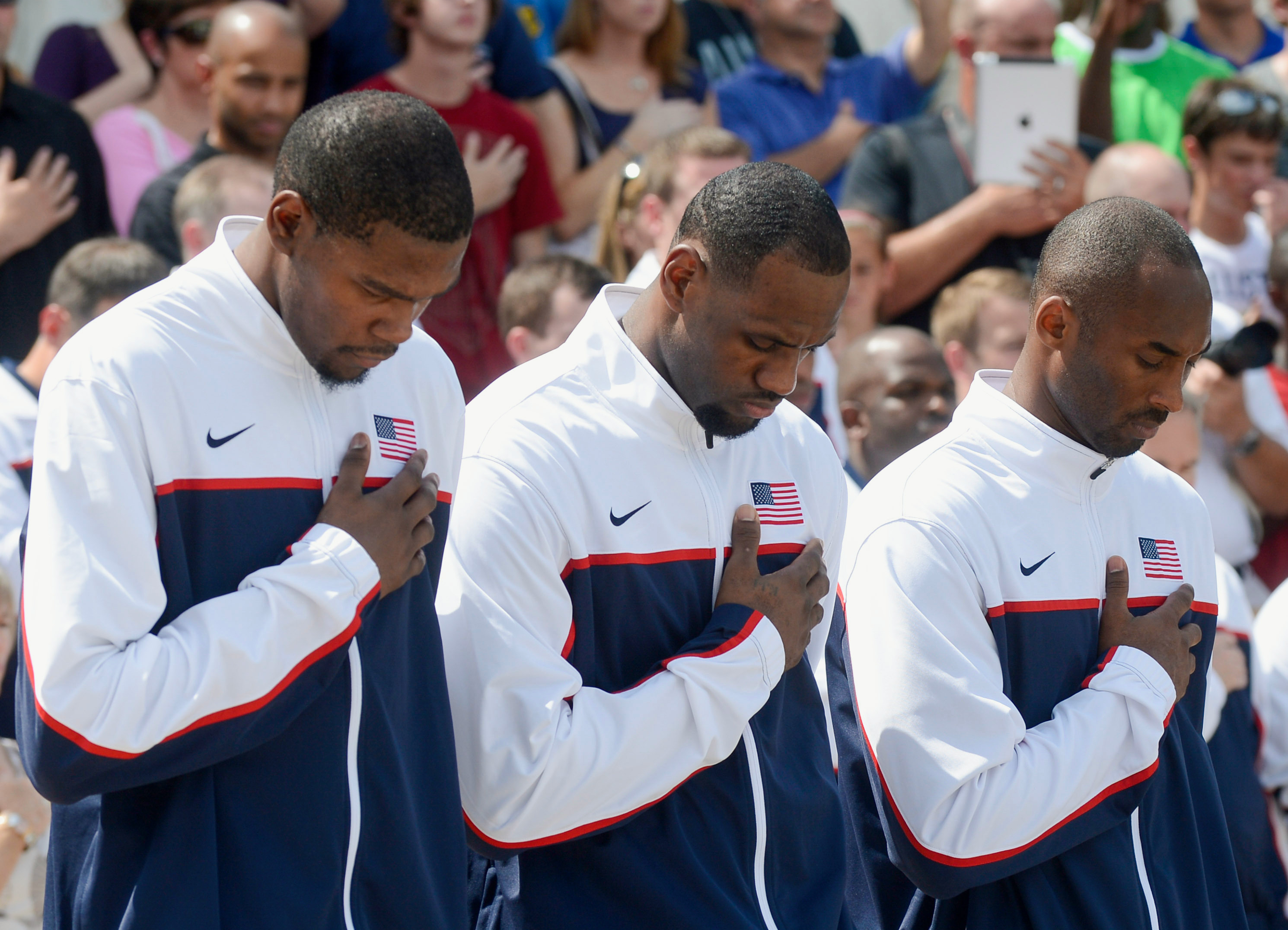
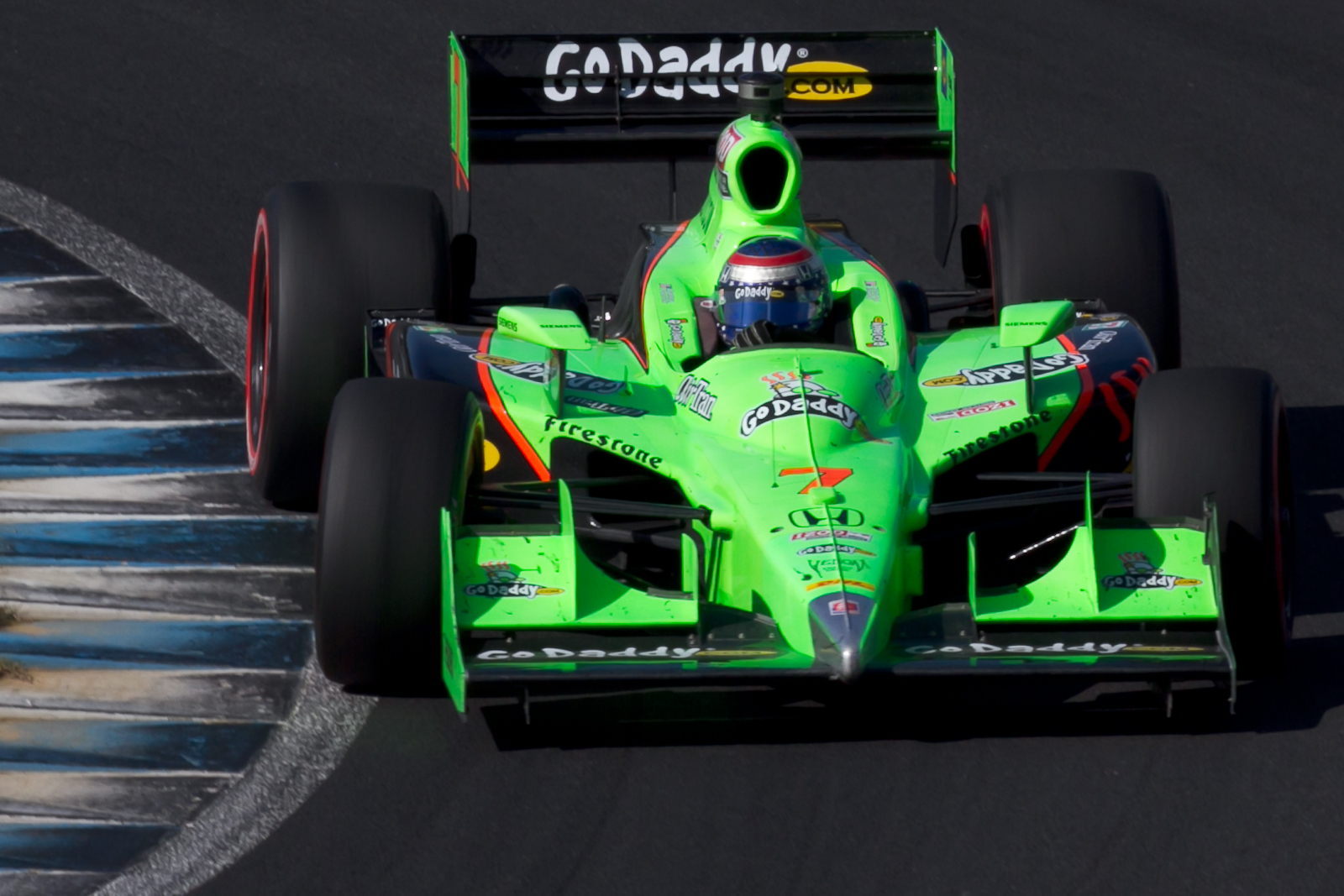
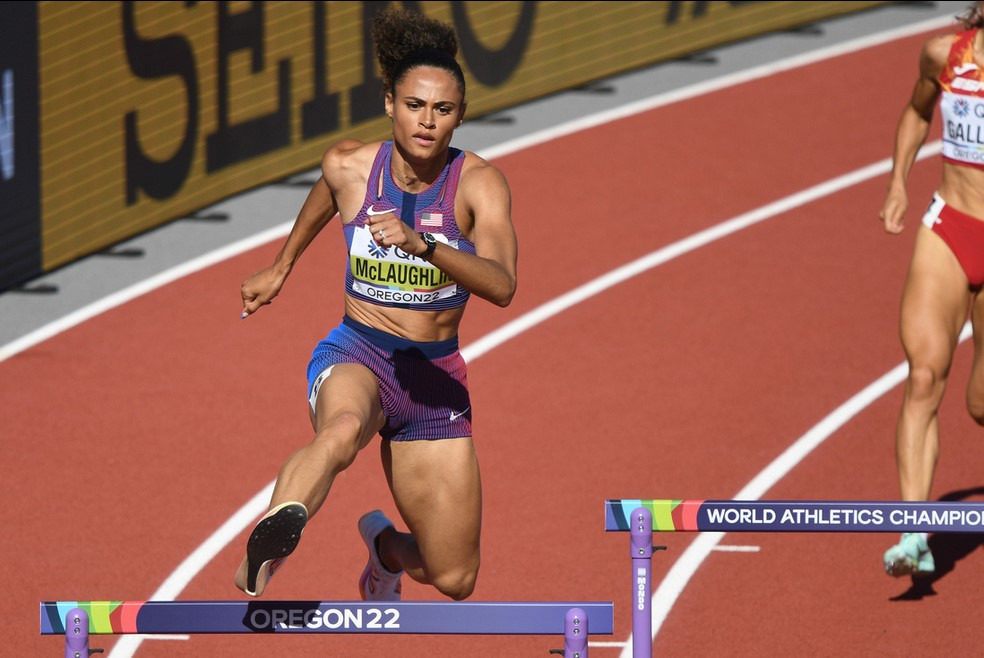
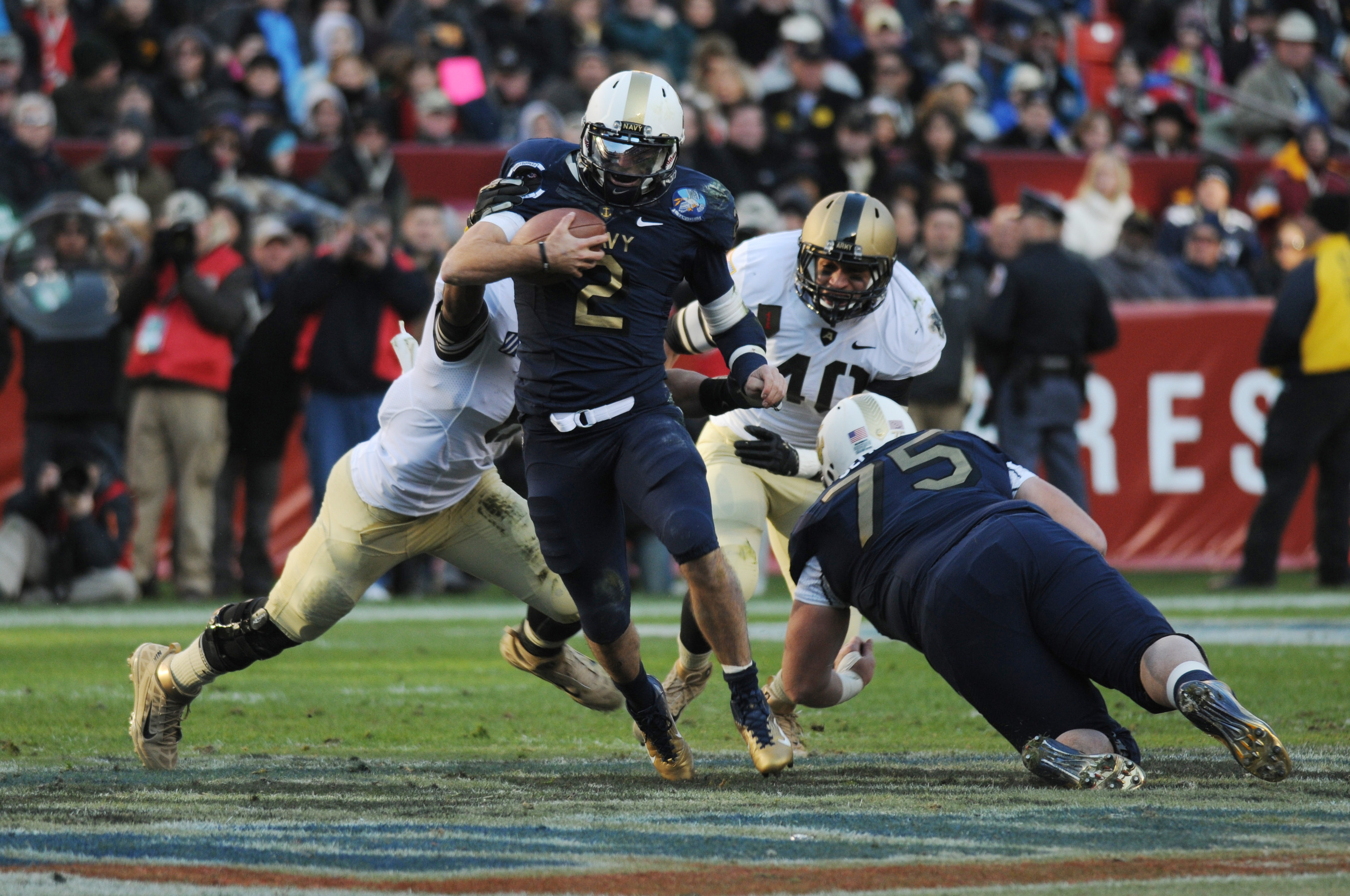
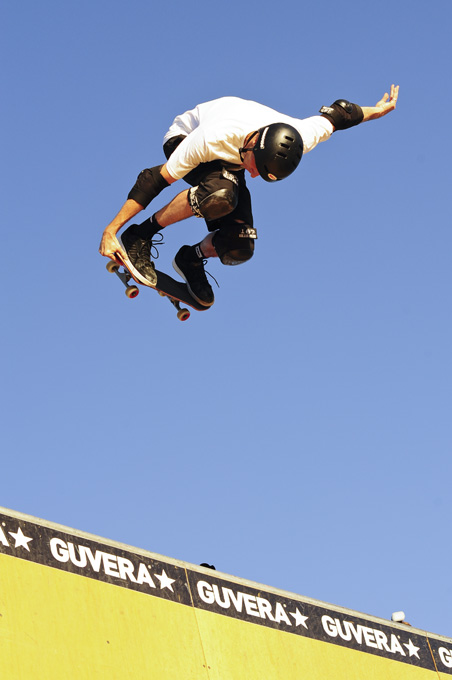
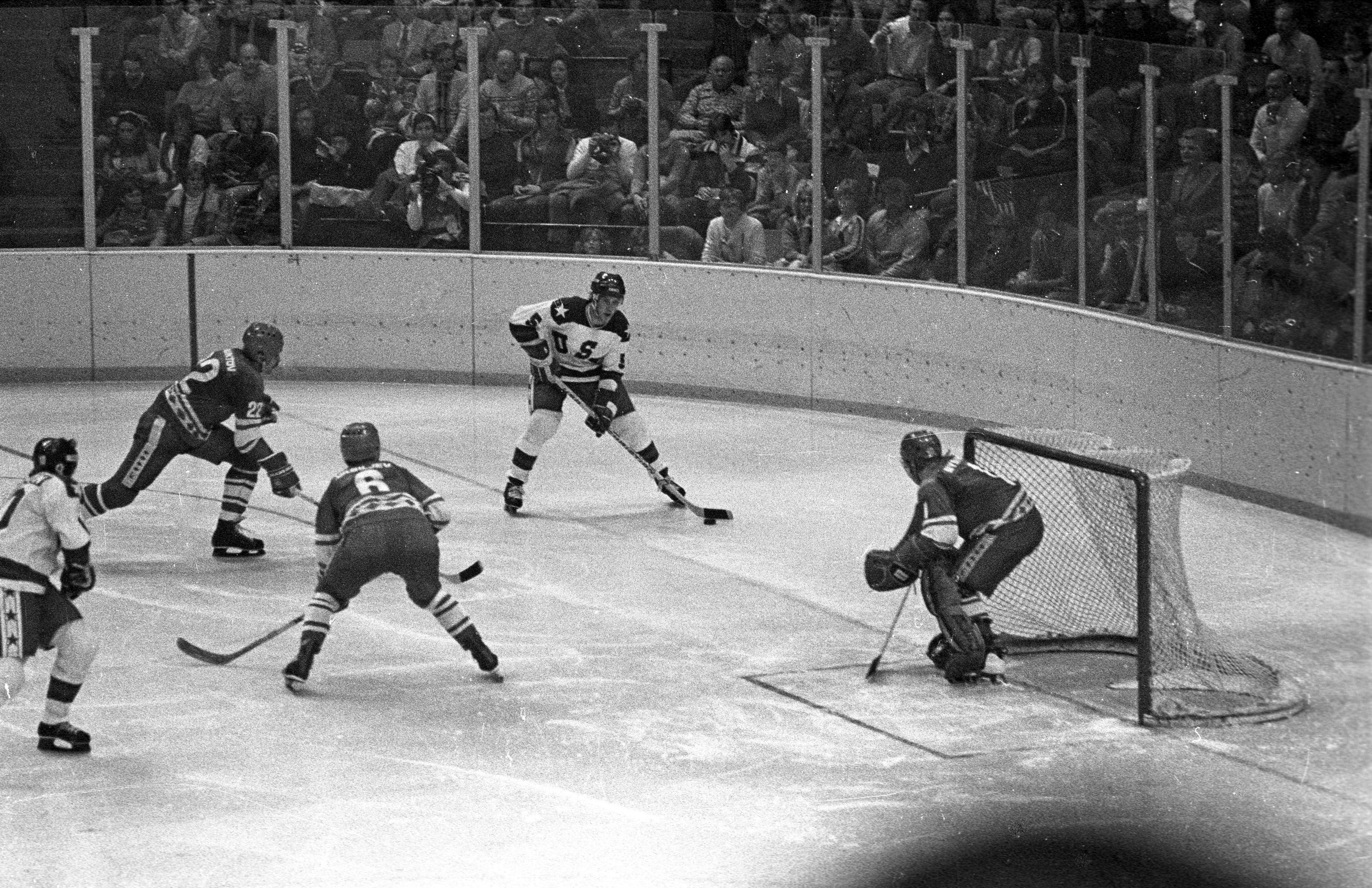
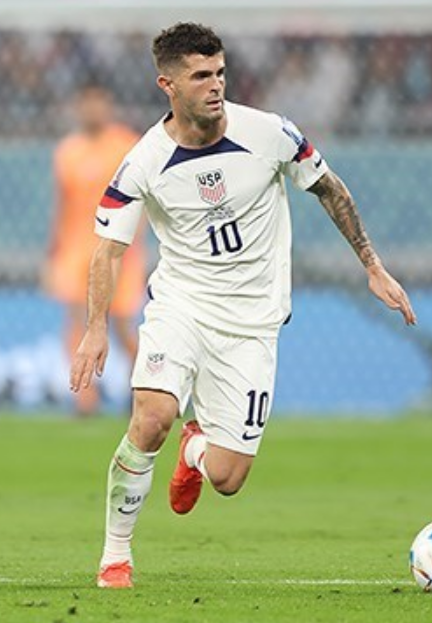
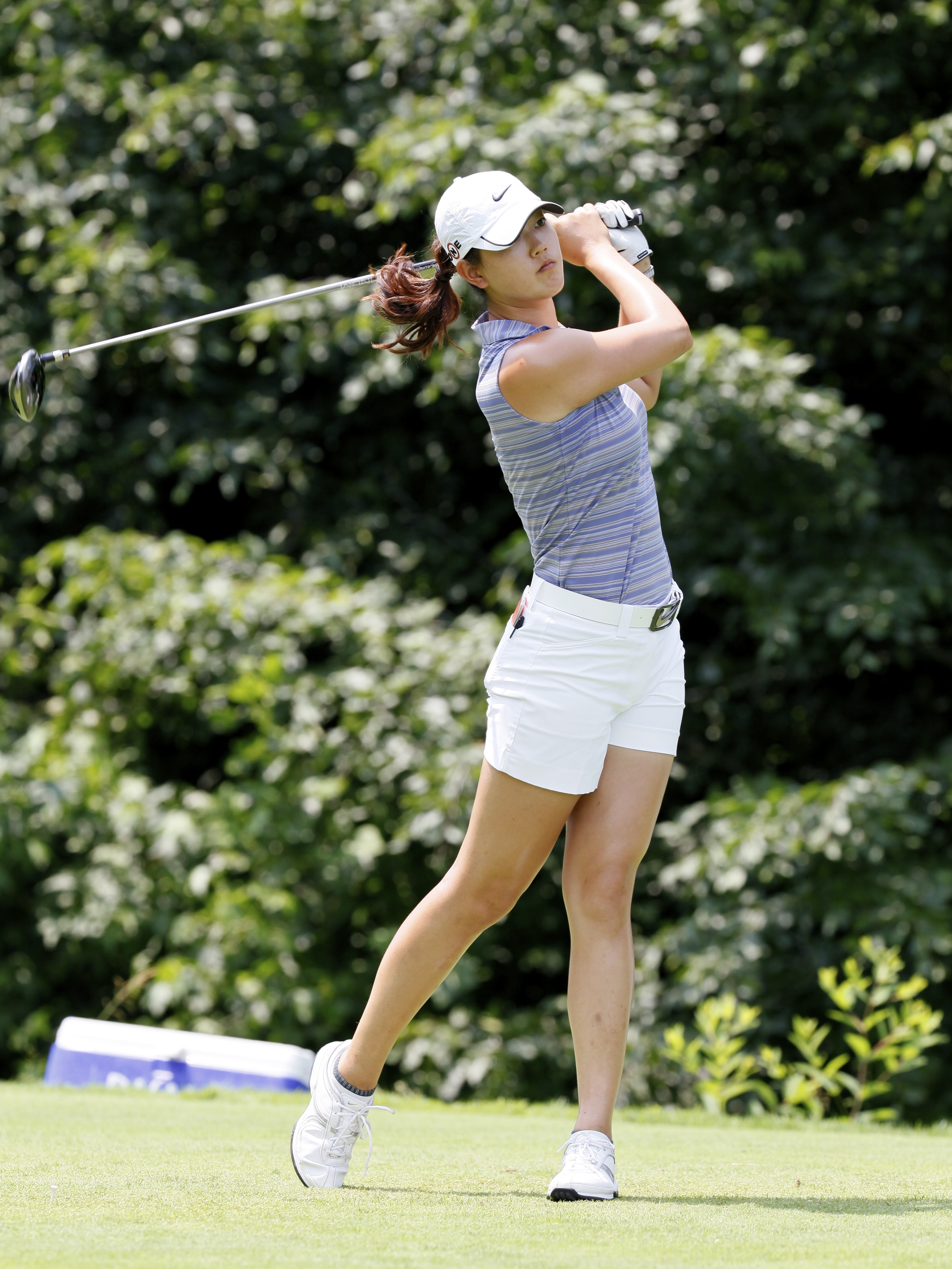
From top, left to right: U.S. baseball team, U.S. men's basketball team, Danica Patrick driving at the IndyCar Series, Sydney McLaughlin, American football Army–Navy Game, the skateboarder Tony Hawk, the 1980 Miracle on Ice hockey game, Christian Pulisic as part of the U.S. men's soccer team, the start of the 2015 Daytona 500, and golfer Michelle Wie West.
Sports in the United States are a significant aspect of the nation's culture. Historically, the most popular sport has been baseball; however, since the mid-20th century American football has slowly become the most popular spectator sport. Additionally, basketball and ice hockey saw a significant growth during this period due to the advent of television. Soccer has emerged as the fourth-most-popular sport in the 21st century, surpassing ice hockey.

In the first half of the 20th century boxing, college rowing, and college football were among the most popular sports after baseball. Golf, tennis, and college basketball are other spectator sports with longstanding popularity. Tennis is currently considered to be the sixth most popular sport in the United States. Most recently, mixed martial arts has been breaking records in attendance and broadcast viewership for all combat sports.

Roughly 27% of United States-based sports fans show an interest in soccer, compared to a global average of 40%. By contrast, American football is the most popular sport in the United States with 52%. Basketball with 43% and baseball with 37% are further behind. Approximately 17% of the people in the United States follow ice hockey.

Based on revenue, the major professional sports leagues in the United States comprise the following: Major League Baseball (MLB), the National Basketball Association (NBA), the National Football League (NFL), the National Hockey League (NHL), and Major League Soccer (MLS).

Just in the year 2024, the NFL generated over $23 billion, making them the most valued professional sports league in the United States and the world. With the addition of multiple TV/Streaming contracts that have been recently signed, the revenue is only expected to increase.

The market for professional sports in the United States is about $69 billion as of 2013, roughly 50% larger than that of all of Europe, the Middle East, and Africa combined. All these leagues enjoy wide-ranging domestic media coverage and, except for MLS, all are considered the preeminent leagues in their respective sports in the world. Although American football does not have a substantial following in other nations, the NFL does have the highest average attendance (67,254) of any professional sports league in the world. MLB has the second highest average attendance of any sports league in the United States (29,293), followed by MLS, the NBA, and the NHL. Of these five American-based leagues, all but the NFL have at least one team in Canada.

Professional teams in all major sports in the United States operate as franchises within a league, meaning that a team may move to a different city if the team's owners believe there would be a financial benefit, but franchise moves are usually subject to some form of league-level approval. All major sports leagues use a similar type of regular-season schedule with a post-season playoff tournament, instead of crowning as champions the team with the best won/loss record against all the other teams. Significantly, in all the major sports leagues in the United States (MLB, NBA, NFL, NHL, and MLS), the teams which set the best regular season record in the history of their respective leagues did not go on to win the championship, even as many low-seeded teams in the playoffs have in fact gone on to win the title. These are factors which are cited as adding to the excitement and relevance of the post-season, and justifying all teams' attempts throughout the regular season to at least qualify for the postseason even as wild cards.

In addition to the major league–level organizations, several sports also have professional minor leagues, active in smaller cities across the country. But as in Canada and Australia, sports leagues in the United States do not practice promotion and relegation, unlike most sports leagues in Europe.

Another notable distinction is that most sports fans in the United States tend to follow more than one team sport, depending on the time of year, unlike the case in many parts of the world where fans might avidly follow only one team sport such as soccer or baseball. Thus, it is possible for an American sports fan who follows multiple sports to spend practically every single day of the year watching professional sports, since there is no time of year when all the major professional leagues would be off-season.

Furthermore, sports are particularly associated with education in the United States, with most high schools and universities having organized sports, while college sports competitions play a very important role in the American sporting culture. In fact, college basketball and college football are more popular than professional sports in some parts of the country, a unique sporting feature in the United States. The major sanctioning body for college sports is the National Collegiate Athletic Association (NCAA). Colleges collectively receive billions of dollars from TV deals, sponsorships, and ticket sales. In 2019, the total revenue generated by NCAA athletic departments added up to $18.9 billion.

Based on the Olympic Games, world championships, and other major competitions in respective sports, the United States is the most successful nation in the world in baseball, basketball, athletics, swimming, lacrosse, beach volleyball, figure skating, tennis, golf, boxing, diving, shooting, rowing and snowboarding, and is one of the top five most successful nations in ice hockey, wrestling, gymnastics, volleyball, speed skating, alpine skiing, bobsleigh, equestrian, sailing, cycling, weightlifting and archery, among others. This makes the United States the most successful sports nation in the world. The United States has been referred to by some as "the hegemon of world sports". The United States has placed first in the Summer Olympic medal table 19 times out of 30 Summer Olympics and 29 appearances. Unlike most other nations, the United States government does not provide funding for sports nor for the United States Olympic & Paralympic Committee. The United States Olympic contingent is additionally the only Olympic contingent in the world to receive no government funding; neither training and development costs nor prize money are provided by the U.S. national government.

With recent American sporting achievements including winning the Summer Olympic medal table 4 straight times (2012, 2016, 2020 and 2024) and in 7 of the 8 Summer Olympics between 1996-2024, winning the 2015 and 2019 FIFA Women's World Cups and making the 2011 FIFA Women's World Cup final, making the semifinals in 8 of the 9 FIFA Women's World Cups, the finals in 5 of the 9 Women's World Cups, winning 4 of them, and winning 5 of the 8 women's Olympic soccer tournaments (where full teams compete), winning the last 5 straight men's Olympic basketball tournaments, from 2008-2024, and the last 8 straight women's Olympic basketball tournaments from 1996-2024, winning the men's and women's Olympic ice hockey gold medals in 2026, winning a record amount of gold medals (12) in the 2026 Winter Olympics, winning the 2018 women's Olympic ice hockey gold, as well as the 1996 World Cup of Hockey (a best on best tournament), winning the 2012, 2016 and 2020 women's Olympic water polo gold medals, winning the last 6 straight all-around gymnastic Olympic gold medals from 2004-2024, winning the most gold medals in swimming in each of the last 9 Summer Olympics (1992-present), winning the most gold medals in athletics in each of the last 11 Summer Olympics (1984-present), winning 11 of the 14 World Lacrosse Championships, winning the most all time Olympic gold medals in figure skating (19), including the 2026 team and women's singles gold medals, winning the most all time Olympic gold medals in snowboarding (17), and the most golds in 6 of the 7 Olympics it was held, winning 3 women's tennis Grand Slam singles titles since 2023 (2023 US Open, 2025 Australian Open, 2025 French Open), having a women's Grand Slam singles winner in 20 of the 29 years from 1998-2026, and making 2 of the last 3 US Open men's tennis finals (2024 and 2026), winning 27 of the last 39 men's major golf championships since 2017, while having a sizable portion of their athletic pool playing American football, there is a question about whether the United States is currently in a sporting golden age, or if American dominance in sports is the norm.

According to the American Time Use Survey, 23.4 percent of the civilian population age 15 and older participated in sports, exercise, or recreation on an average day in 2025. The rate was 25.7 percent for men and 21.1 percent for women, and participants spent an average of 1.47 hours on those activities on days when they participated.

== Northeast ==
The Northeast region is home to numerous professional sports franchises in the "Big Four" leagues (NFL, NBA, NHL and MLB), with more than 100 championships collectively among them. Professional sports leagues such as the National Football League (NFL), Major League Baseball (MLB), National Basketball Association (NBA), Women's National Basketball Association (WNBA), National Hockey League (NHL), Major League Soccer (MLS), and National Women's Soccer League (NWSL), have team franchises in following Northeastern cities:

- New York metropolitan area: Giants, Jets (NFL), Yankees, Mets (MLB), Knicks, Nets (NBA), Rangers, Islanders, Devils (NHL), Red Bulls, City FC or Pigeons (MLS), Liberty (WNBA), Gotham or Bats (NWSL)
- Washington: Commanders (NFL), Nationals (MLB), Wizards (NBA), Capitals (NHL), United (MLS), Mystics (WNBA), Spirit (NWSL)
- Philadelphia: Eagles (NFL), Phillies (MLB), 76ers (NBA), Flyers (NHL), Union (MLS)
- Boston: Patriots (NFL), Red Sox (MLB), Celtics (NBA), Bruins (NHL), Revolution (MLS)
- Pittsburgh: Steelers (NFL), Pirates (MLB), Penguins (NHL)
- Baltimore: Ravens (NFL), Orioles (MLB)
- Buffalo: Bills (NFL), Sabres (NHL)
- Uncasville: Sun (WNBA)

Notable golf tournaments in the Northeastern United States include The Northern Trust, Travelers Championship, and Atlantic City LPGA Classic. The US Open, held in New York, is one of the four Grand Slam tennis tournaments.

Notable Northeastern motorsports tracks include Watkins Glen International, Pocono Raceway, New Hampshire Motor Speedway and Lime Rock Park, which have hosted Formula One, IndyCar, NASCAR and International Motor Sports Association races. Also, drag strips such as Englishtown, Epping and Reading have hosted NHRA national events. Belmont Park at New York hosts the Belmont Stakes horse races, which is part of the Triple Crown of Thoroughbred Racing.

The region has also been noted for the prevalence of the traditionally Northeastern sports of ice hockey and lacrosse.

=== Connecticut ===
There are two Connecticut teams in the American Hockey League. The Bridgeport Islanders is a farm team for the New York Islanders which competes at the Total Mortgage Arena in Bridgeport. The Hartford Wolf Pack is the affiliate of the New York Rangers; they play in the XL Center in Hartford.

The Hartford Yard Goats of the Eastern League are a AA affiliate of the Colorado Rockies. Also, the Norwich Sea Unicorns play in the New York-Penn League and are an A affiliate of the Detroit Tigers. The New Britain Bees play in the Atlantic League of Professional Baseball. The Connecticut Sun of the WNBA currently play at the Mohegan Sun Arena in Uncasville. In soccer, Hartford Athletic will begin play in the USL Championship in 2019, serving as the reserve team for the New England Revolution of Major League Soccer.

The state hosts several major sporting events. Since 1952, a PGA Tour golf tournament has been played in the Hartford area. It was originally called the "Insurance City Open" and later the "Greater Hartford Open" and is now known as the Travelers Championship. The Connecticut Open tennis tournament is held annually in the Cullman-Heyman Tennis Center at Yale University in New Haven.

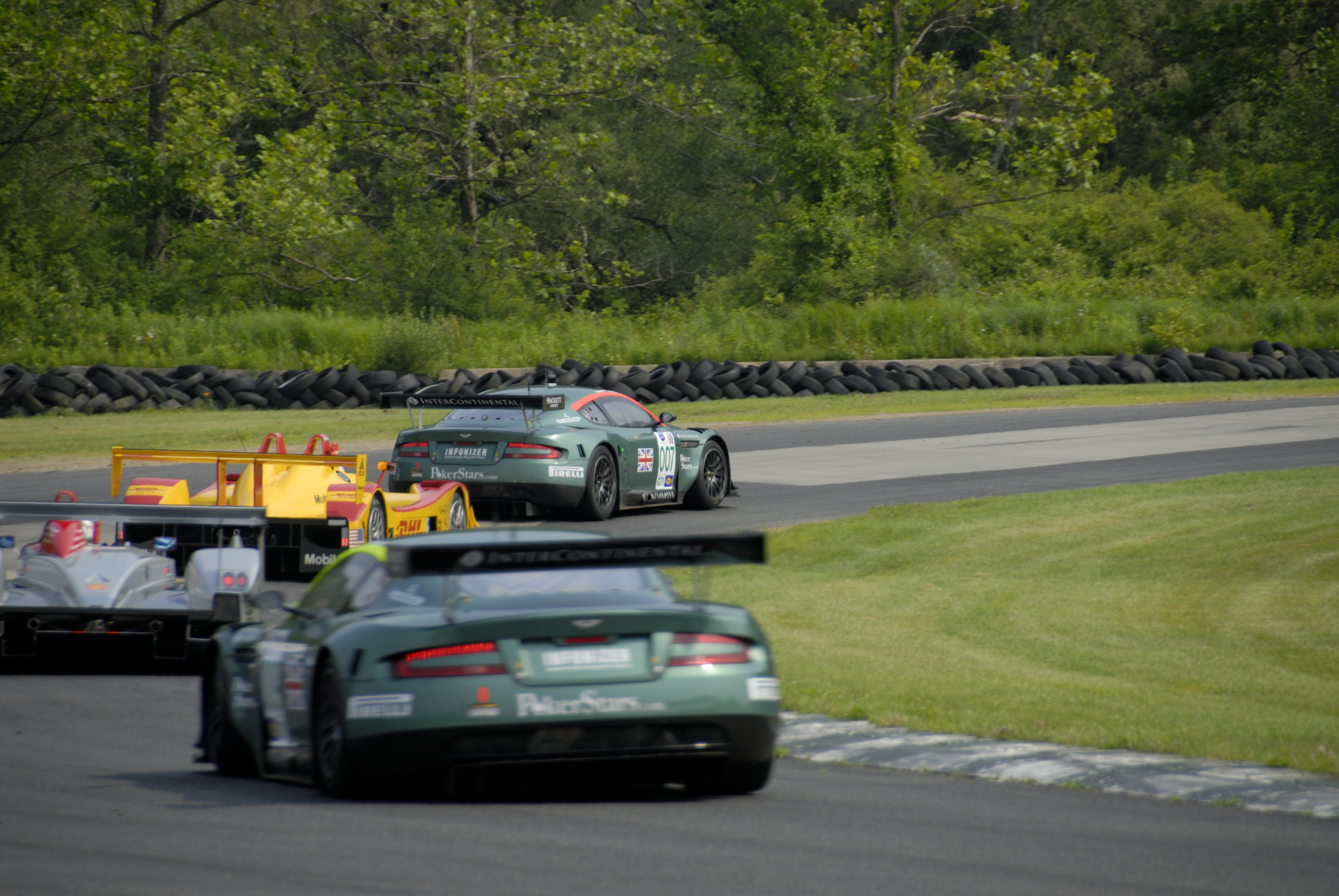
Lime Rock, a home of the American Le Mans Series tournament

Lime Rock Park in Salisbury is a 1.5-mile (2.4 km) road racing course, home to the International Motor Sports Association, SCCA, United States Auto Club, and K&N Pro Series East races. Thompson International Speedway, Stafford Motor Speedway, and Waterford Speedbowl are oval tracks holding weekly races for NASCAR Modifieds and other classes, including the NASCAR Whelen Modified Tour. The state also hosts several major mixed martial arts events for Bellator MMA and the Ultimate Fighting Championship.

==== Professional Sports Teams ====
Hartford Whalers of the National Hockey League played in Hartford from 1975 to 1997 at the Hartford Civic Center. They departed to Raleigh, North Carolina after disputes with the state over the construction of a new arena, and they are now known as the Carolina Hurricanes. In 1926, Hartford had a franchise in the National Football League known as the Hartford Blues. They joined the National League for one season in 1876, making them the state's only Major League baseball franchise before moving to Brooklyn, New York and then disbanding one season later. From 2000 until 2006 the city was home to the Hartford FoxForce of World TeamTennis.

Team	Sport	League
Bridgeport Sound Tigers	Ice hockey	American Hockey League
Hartford Wolf Pack	Ice hockey	American Hockey League
Connecticut Whale	Ice Hockey	Premier Hockey Federation
Hartford Yard Goats	Baseball	Eastern League (AA)
Connecticut Tigers	Baseball	New York–Penn League (A)
New Britain Bees	Baseball	Atlantic League
Connecticut Sun	Basketball	Women's National Basketball Association
Hartford City FC	Soccer	National Premier Soccer League
Hartford Athletic	Soccer	USL Championship
AC Connecticut	Soccer	USL League Two
New England Black Wolves	Lacrosse	National Lacrosse League

==== College Sports ====
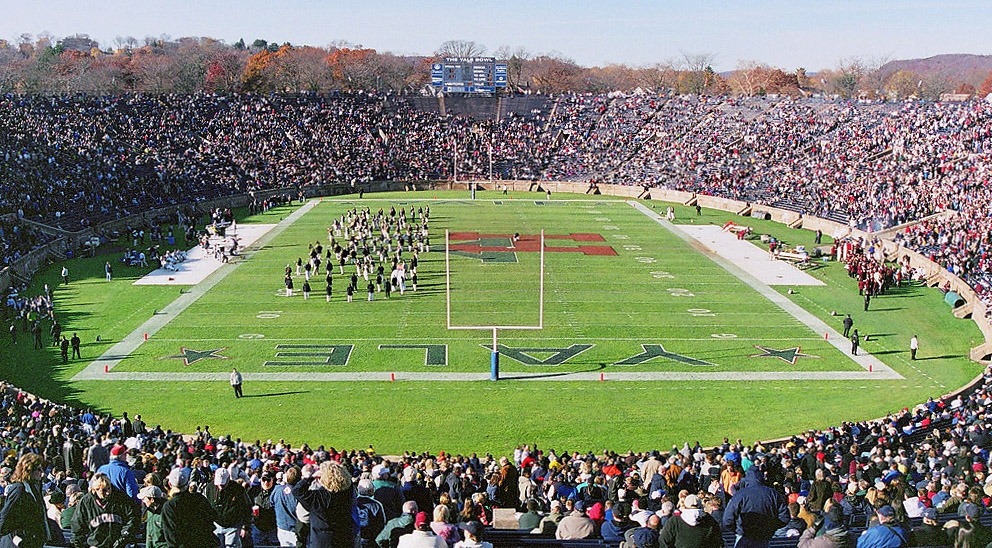
Yale Bowl during "The Game" between Yale and Harvard. The Bowl was also the home of the NFL's New York Giants in 1973–74.

The Connecticut Huskies are the team of the University of Connecticut (UConn); they play NCAA Division I sports. Both the men's basketball and women's basketball teams have won multiple national championships. In 2004, UConn became the first school in NCAA Division I history to have its men's and women's basketball programs win the national title in the same year; they repeated the feat in 2014 and are still the only Division I school to win both titles in the same year. The UConn women's basketball team holds the record for the longest consecutive winning streak in NCAA college basketball at 111 games, a streak that ended in 2017. The UConn Huskies football team has played in the Football Bowl Subdivision since 2002, and has played in four bowl games.

New Haven biennially hosts "The Game" between the Yale Bulldogs and the Harvard Crimson, the country's second-oldest college football rivalry. Yale alumnus Walter Camp is deemed the "Father of American football", and he helped develop modern football while living in New Haven. Other Connecticut universities which feature Division I sports teams are Quinnipiac University, Fairfield University, Central Connecticut State University, Sacred Heart University, and the University of Hartford.

=== Delaware ===
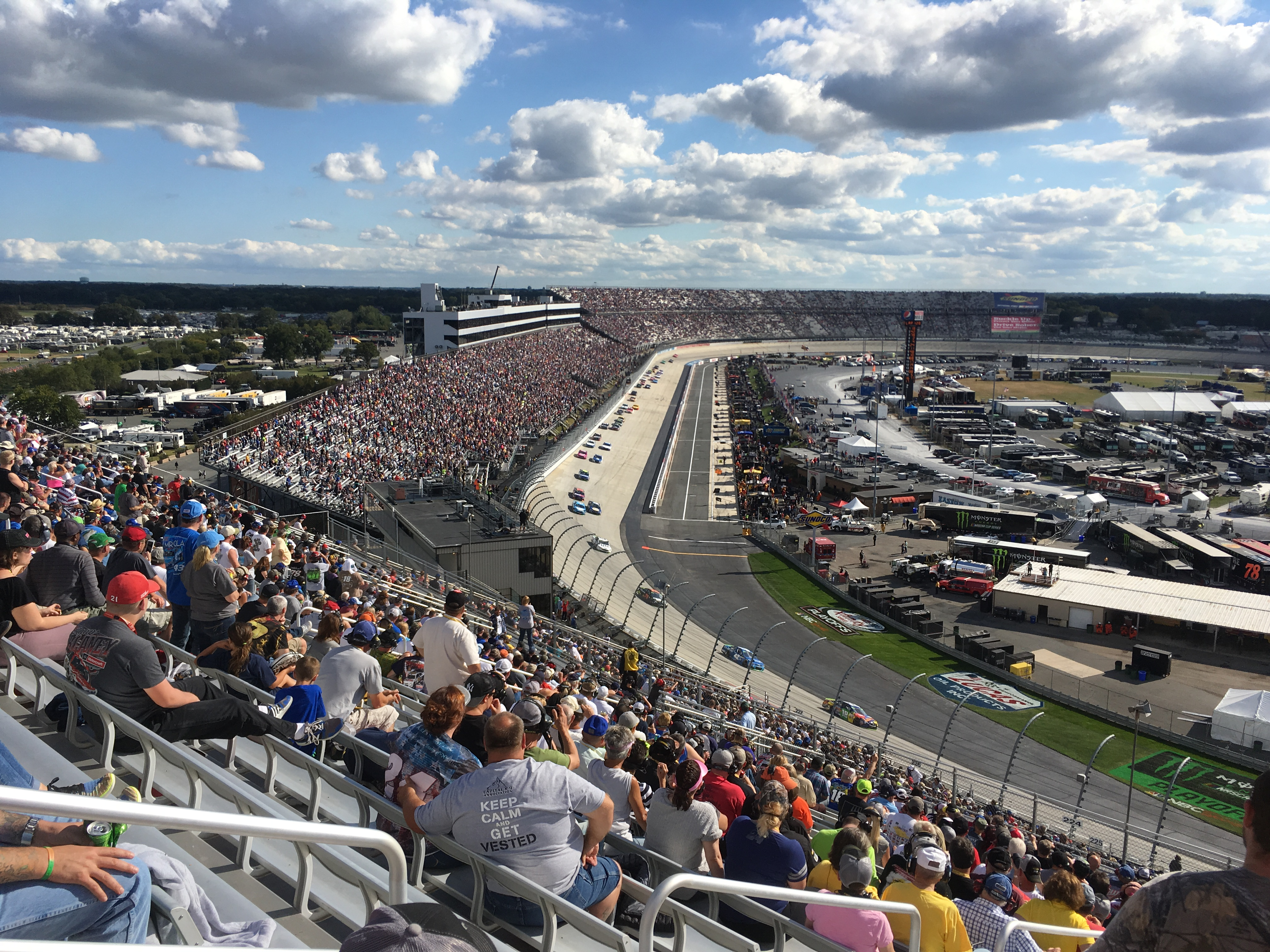
NASCAR racing at Dover Motor Speedway in Dover

Professional teams

Team	Sport	League
Delaware Black Foxes	Rugby league	USA Rugby League
Delaware Blue Coats	Basketball	NBA G League
Delaware Thunder	Hockey	Federal Prospects Hockey League
Diamond State Roller Girls	Roller derby	Women's Flat Track Derby Association
Wilmington Blue Rocks	Baseball	South Atlantic League

As Delaware has no franchises in the major American professional sports leagues, many Delawareans follow either Philadelphia or Baltimore teams. In the WNBA, the Washington Mystics enjoy a major following due to the presence of Wilmington native and University of Delaware product Elena Delle Donne. The University of Delaware's football team has a large following throughout the state, with the Delaware State University and Wesley College teams also enjoying a smaller degree of support.

Delaware is home to Dover Motor Speedway and Bally's Dover. Dover Motor Speedway, also known as the Monster Mile, is one of only 10 tracks in the nation to have hosted 100 or more NASCAR Cup Series races. Bally's Dover is a popular harness racing facility. It is the only co-located horse- and car-racing facility in the nation, with the Bally's Dover track located inside the Dover Motor Speedway track.

Delaware is represented in rugby by the Delaware Black Foxes, a 2015 expansion club.

Delaware has been home to two professional wrestling outfits: Combat Zone Wrestling (CZW) and its Tournament of Death, and ECWA with its annual Super 8 Tournament.

Delaware's official state sport is bicycling.

=== Maine ===
Maine has never had a major professional sports team. Like most of New England, Mainers are fans of Boston sports teams.

==== Professional Sports Teams ====
- Maine Celtics, basketball, NBA G League
- Portland Sea Dogs, minor league baseball, Eastern League (1938–2020)
- Maine Mariners, ice hockey, ECHL
- Portland Hearts of Pine, Soccer, USL League One

==== Non-professional Sports Teams ====
- Maine Roller Derby, roller derby, Women's Flat Track Derby Association

==== NCAA ====
- Maine Black Bears

=== Maryland ===
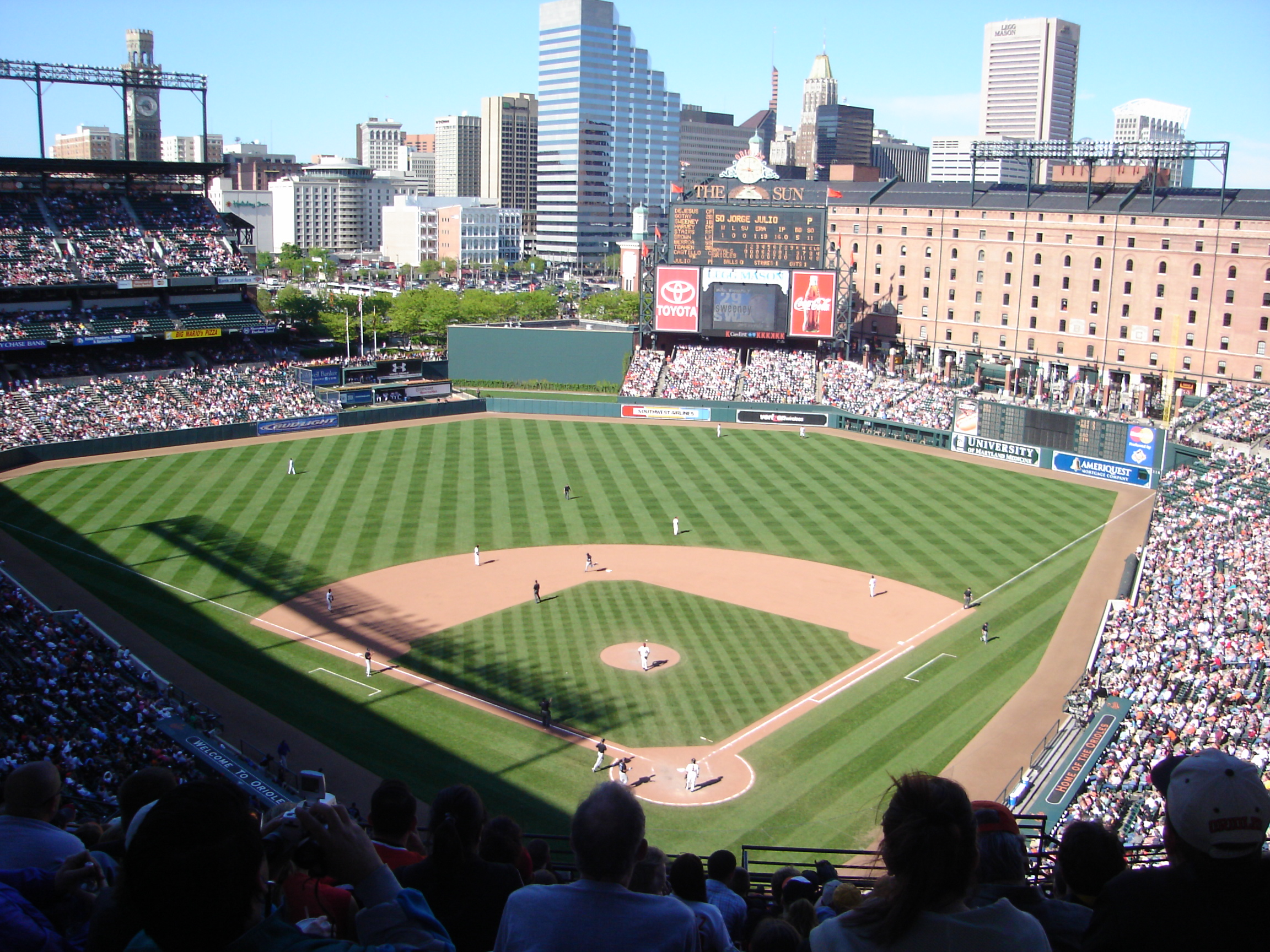
Oriole Park at Camden Yards

Maryland has a number of major and minor professional sports franchises. Two National Football League teams play in Maryland, the Baltimore Ravens in Baltimore and the Washington Commanders in Prince George's County. The Baltimore Orioles compete as Major League Baseball franchise in Baltimore.

Other professional sports franchises in the state include five affiliated minor league baseball teams, one independent league baseball team, the Baltimore Blast indoor soccer team, two indoor football teams, two low-level Basketball teams, and three low-level outdoor soccer teams.

The Congressional Country Club has hosted several professional golf tournaments, including the U.S. Open, PGA Championship, U.S. Senior Open, Senior PGA Championship, Kemper Open and Quicken Loans National.

Maryland has had famous athletes including baseball's Al Kaline of the Detroit Tigers, Orioles' Cal Ripken Jr. and George Herman ("Babe") Ruth, who played for the old Orioles, Boston Red Sox, and especially won fame with the New York Yankees. Plus Olympic swimming medalists Michael Phelps, Katie Ledecky, Chase Kalisz, and Katie Hoff.

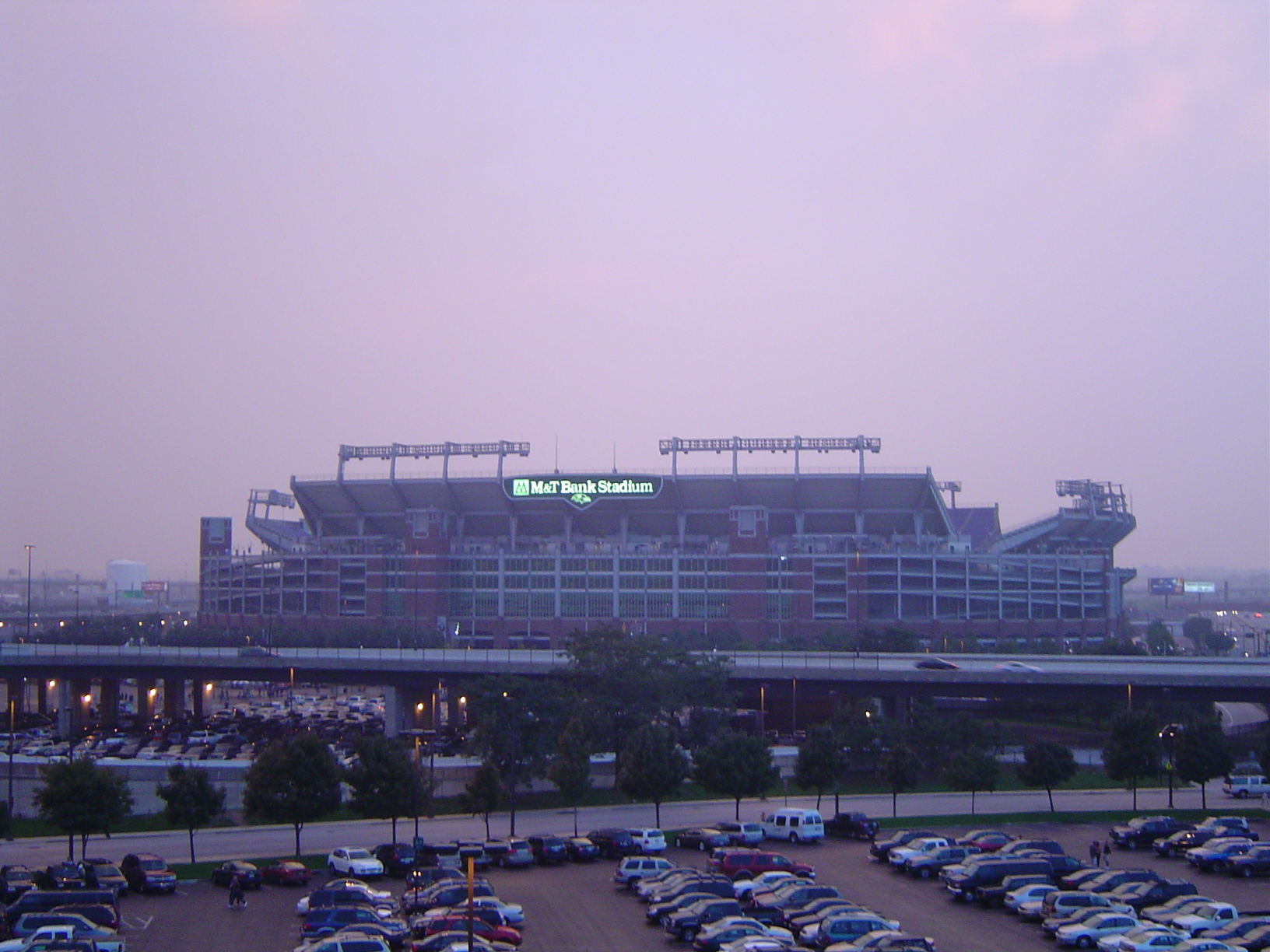
M&T Bank Stadium

Since 1962, the official state sport of Maryland is jousting. Lacrosse was named the official team sport in 2004, and Sports Illustrated wrote the sport "has always been the showcase for the flower of Maryland manhood." In 2008, intending to promote physical fitness for all ages, Maryland declared walking the official state exercise and became the first state with an official state exercise.

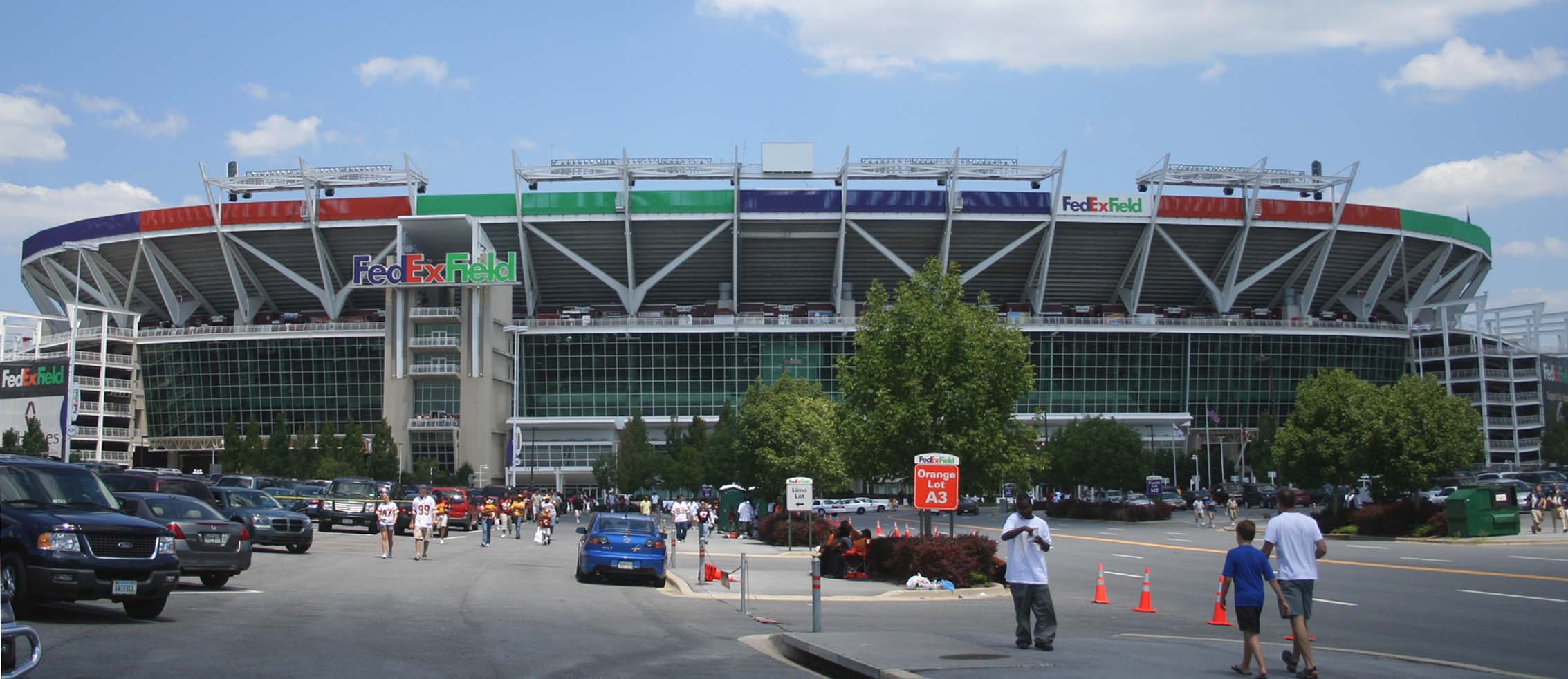
FedExField

=== Massachusetts ===
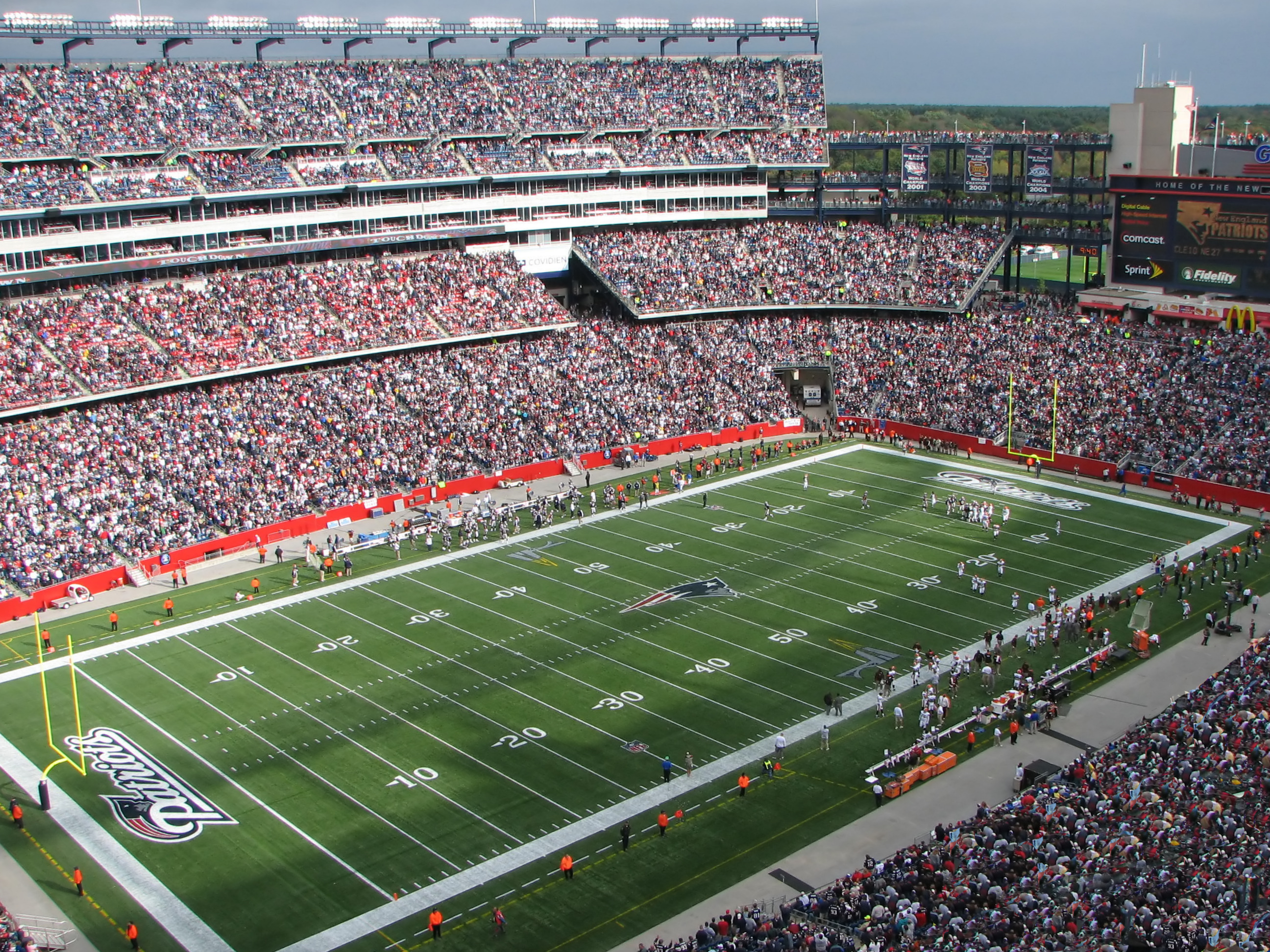
Gillette Stadium, located in Foxborough, Massachusetts, is the home stadium of the NFL's New England Patriots and MLS' New England Revolution

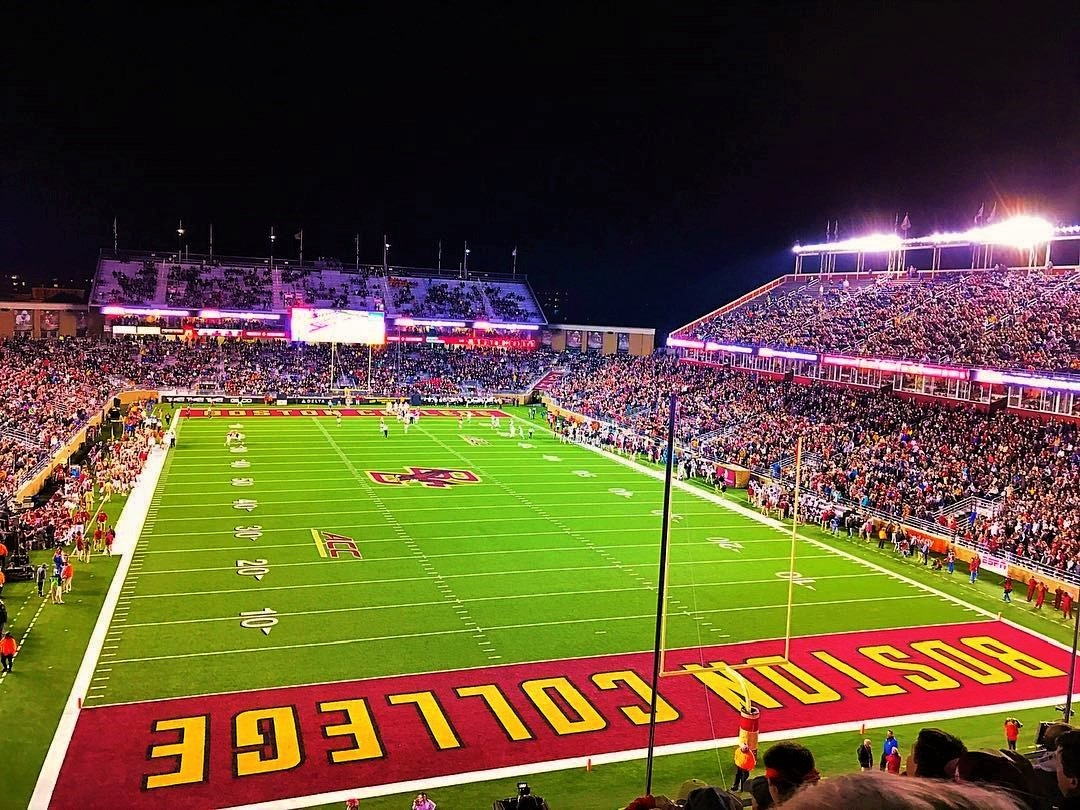
Alumni Stadium, located in Chestnut Hill, Massachusetts, is the home stadium of the Boston College Eagles

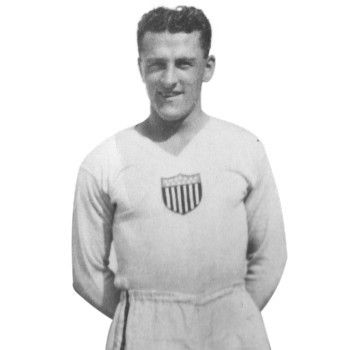
Bert Patenaude, a native of Fall River, Massachusetts, scored the first hat-trick in FIFA World Cup history in 1930 for the United States

Sports in Massachusetts have a long history with both amateur athletics and professional teams. Most of the major professional teams have won multiple championships in their respective leagues. For instance, as of July 2025, Massachusetts teams have won 6 Stanley Cups (Boston Bruins), 18 NBA Championships (Boston Celtics), 6 Super Bowls (New England Patriots), and 10 World Series (9 Boston Red Sox, 1 Boston Braves). Additionally, the New England Revolution won the U.S. Open Cup in 2007 and the MLS Supporter's Shield in 2021. Massachusetts is also notable for being the birthplace of both basketball and volleyball, and it is home to the Basketball Hall of Fame (Springfield) and the Volleyball Hall of Fame (Holyoke). Moreover, the state hosts the Cape Cod Baseball League and prestigious sports events such as the Boston Marathon and the Head of the Charles Regatta (Boston). Other popular sports events in Massachusetts include the Falmouth Road Race in running, which started in 1973, and the Fitchburg Longsjo Classic, an annual bicycle race held from 1960 to 2020.

The Greater Boston region is the only city/surrounding area in American professional sports in which all facilities are privately owned and operated. The Kraft Sports Group, which holds ownership of both the Patriots and New England Revolution (a Major League Soccer team), owns Gillette Stadium located in Foxborough, Massachusetts. Fenway Sports Group, led by principal owner John W. Henry, owns both Fenway Park and the Boston Red Sox. TD Garden is owned by Delaware North, and its chairman, Jeremy M. Jacobs, along with his family, owns the Bruins. The Celtics rent TD Garden from Delaware North.

The PGA Tour Deutsche Bank Championship was a regular professional golf tournament held from 2003 to 2018 in Norton, Massachusetts. As of July 2025, Massachusetts has played host to ten U.S. Opens, four U.S. Women's Opens, two Ryder Cups, and two U.S. Senior Open.

Massachusetts is home to many colleges and universities that are active in college athletics, hosting several NCAA Division I (D-I) institutions that compete in multiple sports. The D-I schools include Boston College, Boston University, Northeastern University, Harvard University, College of the Holy Cross, the University of Massachusetts Amherst, the University of Massachusetts Lowell, Merrimack College, and Stonehill College.

=== New Hampshire ===
The following sports teams are based in New Hampshire:

Club	Sport	Venue	League	Level	notes
Amoskeag Rugby Club	Rugby union	Northeast Athletic Club, Pembroke	New England Rugby Football Union	Amateur	
Keene Swamp Bats	Baseball	Alumni Field, Keene	New England Collegiate Baseball League	Collegiate summer baseball	
Nashua Silver Knights	Baseball	Holman Stadium, Nashua	Futures Collegiate Baseball League	Collegiate summer baseball	
New Hampshire Fisher Cats	Baseball	Delta Dental Stadium, Manchester	Double-A Eastern League	Professional	Double-A affiliate of the Toronto Blue Jays
New Hampshire Wild	Baseball	Doane Diamond, Concord	Empire Professional Baseball League	Professional	Independent minor league
Northeast Ruckus	American football	Nor Rock Field	Womans Football Alliance	Semi-professional	Based in Windham, plays home games in nearby Raymond, New Hampshire
Seacoast United Phantoms	Soccer	New England Sports Park	USL League Two	Semi-professional	Based in Portsmouth, plays home games in nearby Hampton, New Hampshire
New Hampshire Mountain Kings	Ice Hockey	Tri-Town Ice Arena, Hooksett	North American Hockey League	Amateur	

The sport of paintball was invented in Henniker in 1981. Sutton was the home of the world's first commercial paintball facility.

The New Hampshire Motor Speedway in Loudon is an oval track and road course that has been visited by national motorsport championship series such as the NASCAR Cup Series, the NASCAR Xfinity Series, the NASCAR Craftsman Truck Series, NASCAR Whelen Modified Tour, American Canadian Tour (ACT), the Champ Car and the IndyCar Series. Other motor racing venues include Star Speedway and New England Dragway in Epping, Lee USA Speedway in Lee, Twin State Speedway in Claremont, Monadnock Speedway in Winchester and Canaan Fair Speedway in Canaan.

New Hampshire has two universities competing at the NCAA Division I in all collegiate sports: the Dartmouth Big Green (Ivy League) and the New Hampshire Wildcats (America East Conference), as well as three NCAA Division II teams: Franklin Pierce Ravens, Saint Anselm Hawks, and Southern New Hampshire Penmen (Northeast-10 Conference). Most other schools compete in NCAA Division III or the NAIA.

Annually since 2002, high-school statewide all-stars compete against Vermont in 10 sports during "Twin State" playoffs.

=== New Jersey ===
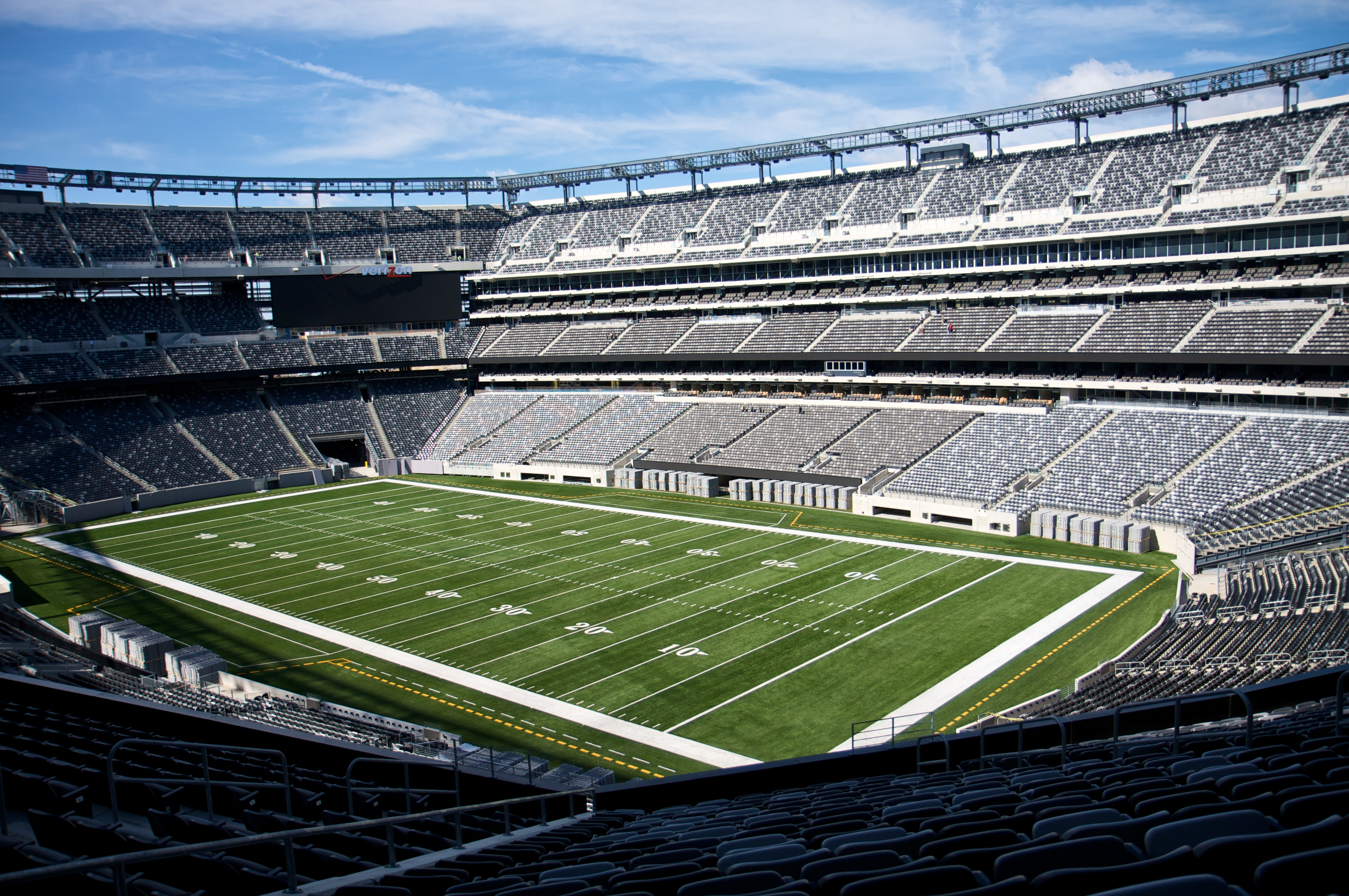
MetLife Stadium in East Rutherford, Bergen County, home to the NFL's New York Giants and New York Jets and the most expensive stadium ever built

New Jersey currently has four teams from major professional sports leagues playing in the state, although the Major League Soccer team and two National Football League teams identify themselves as being from the New York metropolitan area.

==== Professional sports ====
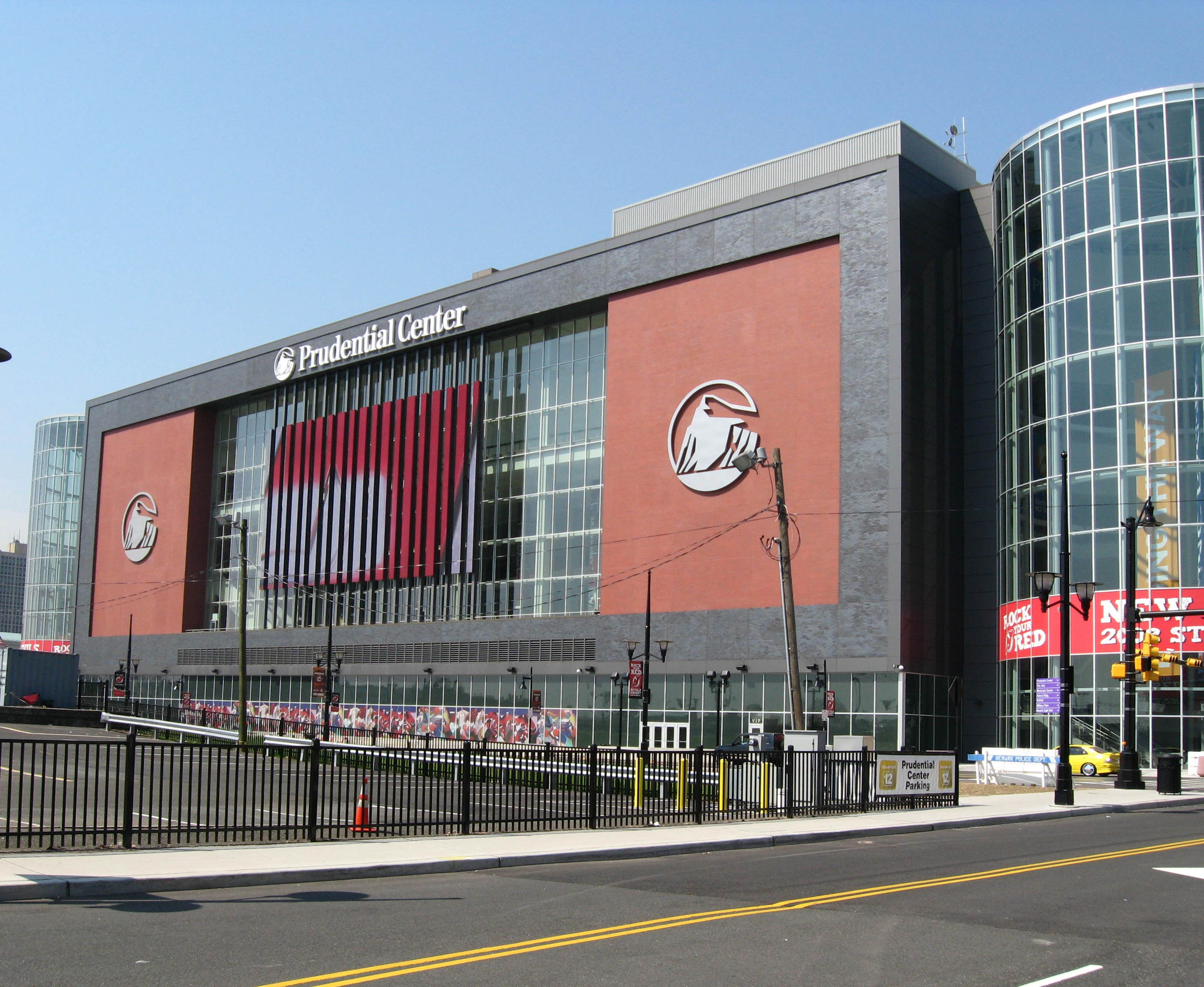
The Prudential Center in Newark, home of the NHL's New Jersey Devils

The National Hockey League's New Jersey Devils, based in Newark at the Prudential Center, is the only major league sports franchise to bear the state's name. Founded in 1974 in Kansas City, Missouri, as the Kansas City Scouts, the team played in Denver, Colorado, as the Colorado Rockies from 1976 until the spring of 1982 when naval architect, businessman, and Jersey City native John J. McMullen purchased, renamed, and moved the franchise to Brendan Byrne Arena in East Rutherford's Meadowlands Sports Complex. While the team had mostly losing records in Kansas City, Denver, and its first years in New Jersey, the Devils began to improve in the late 1980s and early 1990s under Hall of Fame president and general manager Lou Lamoriello. The team made the playoffs for the Stanley Cup in 2001 and 2012, and won it in 1995, 2000, and 2003. The organization is the youngest of the nine major league teams in the New York metropolitan area. The Devils have established a following throughout the northern and central portions of the state, carving a place in a media market once dominated by the New York Rangers and Islanders.

In 2018, the Philadelphia Flyers renovated and expanded their training facility, the Virtua Center Flyers Skate Zone, in Voorhees Township in the southern portion of the state.

The New York Metropolitan Area's two National Football League teams, the New York Giants and the New York Jets, play at MetLife Stadium in East Rutherford's Meadowlands Sports Complex. Built for about $1.6 billion, the venue is the most expensive stadium ever built. On February 2, 2014, MetLife Stadium hosted Super Bowl XLVIII.

The New York Red Bulls of Major League Soccer play in Red Bull Arena, a soccer-specific stadium in Harrison across the Passaic River from downtown Newark. On July 27, 2011, Red Bull Arena hosted the 2011 MLS All-Star Game.

From 1977 to 2012, New Jersey had a National Basketball Association team, the New Jersey Nets. WNBA's New York Liberty played in New Jersey from 2011 to 2013 while their primary home arena, Madison Square Garden was undergoing renovations. In 2016, the Philadelphia 76ers of the NBA opened their new headquarters and training facility, the Philadelphia 76ers Training Complex, in Camden.

The Meadowlands Sports Complex is home to the Meadowlands Racetrack, one of three major harness racing tracks in the state. The Meadowlands Racetrack and Freehold Raceway in Freehold are two of the major harness racing tracks in North America. Monmouth Park Racetrack in Oceanport is a popular spot for thoroughbred racing in New Jersey and the northeast. It hosted the Breeders' Cup in 2007, and its turf course was renovated in preparation.

==== New Jersey teams ====
Club	Sport	League	Stadium (capacity)	Established	Titles
New Jersey Devils	Ice hockey	NHL	Prudential Center (16,514)	1974	3
Metropolitan Riveters	Ice hockey	NWHL	Barnabas Health Hockey House at the Prudential Center (5,000)	2015	1
Sky Blue FC	Soccer	NWSL	Yurcak Field (5,000)	2007	1

==== New York teams that play in New Jersey ====
Club	Sport	League	Stadium (capacity)	Established	Titles
New York Giants	Football	NFL	MetLife Stadium (82,500)	1925	8
New York Jets	Football	NFL	MetLife Stadium (82,500)	1959	1
New York Red Bulls	Soccer	MLS	Red Bull Arena (25,000)	1994	0

==== New Jersey teams ====
Club	Sport	League	Stadium (capacity)	Established	Titles
Trenton Thunder	Baseball	MiLB (AA-EL)	Arm & Hammer Park (6,150)	1980	3
Lakewood BlueClaws	Baseball	MiLB (A-SAL)	FirstEnergy Park (8,000)	1987	3
Somerset Patriots	Baseball	ALPB	TD Bank Ballpark (6,100)	1997	6
New Jersey Jackals	Baseball	CAN-AM	Yogi Berra Stadium (5,000)	1998	5
Sussex County Miners	Baseball	CAN-AM	Skylands Stadium (4,200)	2015	1
Jersey Express	Basketball	ABA	Wayne YMCA	2005	0

==== New York minor league teams that play in New Jersey ====
Club	Sport	League	Stadium (capacity)	Established	Titles
New York Red Bulls II	Soccer	USL	MSU Soccer Park at Pittser Field (5,000)	2015	1

==== Major schools ====
New Jerseyans' collegiate allegiances are predominantly split among the three major NCAA Division I programs in the state: the Rutgers University (New Jersey's flagship state university) Scarlet Knights, members of the Big Ten Conference; the Seton Hall University (the state's largest Catholic university) Pirates, members of the Big East Conference; and the Princeton University (the state's Ivy League university) Tigers.

The intense rivalry between Rutgers and Princeton athletics began with the first intercollegiate football game in 1869. The schools have not met on the football field since 1980, but they continue to play each other annually in all other sports offered by the two universities.

Rutgers, which fields 24 teams in various sports, is nationally known for its excellent football program, with a 6–4 all-time bowl record; and its excellent women's basketball programs, which appeared in a National Final in 2007. In 2008 and 2009, Rutgers expanded their football home HighPoint.com Stadium on the Busch Campus. The basketball teams play at Louis Brown Athletic Center on Livingston Campus. Both venues and campuses are in Piscataway, across the Raritan River from New Brunswick. The university also fields men's basketball and baseball programs. Rutgers' fans live mostly in the western parts of the state and Middlesex County; its alumni base is the largest in the state.

Rutgers' satellite campuses in Camden and Newark each field their own athletic programs – the Rutgers–Camden Scarlet Raptors and the Rutgers–Newark Scarlet Raiders — which both compete in NCAA Division III.

Seton Hall fields no football team, but its men's basketball team is one of the Big East's storied programs. No New Jersey team has won more games in the NCAA Division I men's basketball tournament, and it is the state's only men's basketball program to reach a modern National Final. The Pirates play their home games at Prudential Center in downtown Newark, about four miles from the university's South Orange campus. Their fans hail largely from in the predominantly Roman Catholic areas of the northern part of the state and the Jersey Shore. The annual inter-conference rivalry game between Seton Hall and Rutgers, whose venue alternates between Newark and Piscataway, the Garden State Hardwood Classic, is planned through 2026.

==== Other schools ====
The state's other Division I schools include the Monmouth University Hawks (West Long Branch), the New Jersey Institute of Technology (NJIT) Highlanders (Newark), the Rider University Broncs (Lawrenceville), and the Saint Peter's University Peacocks and Peahens (Jersey City).

Fairleigh Dickinson University competes in both Division I and Division III. It has two campuses, each with its own sports teams. The teams at the Metropolitan Campus are known as the FDU Knights, and compete in the Northeast Conference and NCAA Division I. The College at Florham (FDU-Florham) teams are known as the FDU-Florham Devils and compete in the Middle Atlantic Conferences' Freedom Conference and NCAA Division III

Among the various Division III schools in the state, the Stevens Institute of Technology Ducks have fielded the longest continuously running collegiate men's lacrosse program in the country. 2009 marked the 125th season.

=== Rhode Island ===
==== Professional ====
Two professional minor league teams play in Rhode Island. The Providence Bruins ice hockey team—which won the AHL's Calder Cup during the 1998–99 AHL season—is affiliated with the Boston Bruins, and play at Amica Mutual Pavilion in Providence. The Rhode Island FC, an association football soccer team, began competing in the second tier USL Championship in 2024 at Beirne Stadium at Bryant University, and now play at Centreville Bank Stadium in Pawtucket.

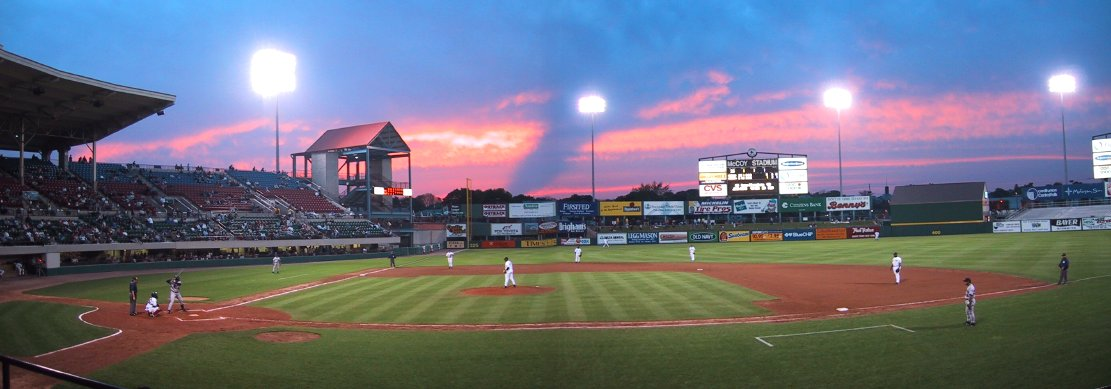
The Pawtucket Red Sox played at McCoy Stadium

The Pawtucket Red Sox baseball team was a Triple-A International League affiliate of the nearby Boston Red Sox from 1973 to 2020. They played at McCoy Stadium in Pawtucket and had won four league titles, the Governors' Cup, in 1973, 1984, 2012, and 2014. McCoy Stadium also has the distinction of being home to the longest professional baseball game ever played – 33 innings.

The Providence Reds were a hockey team that played in the Canadian-American Hockey League (CAHL) from 1926 to 1936, and the American Hockey League (AHL) from 1936 to 1977, the last season of which they played as the Rhode Island Reds. The team won the Calder Cup in 1938, 1940, 1949, and 1956. The Reds played at the Rhode Island Auditorium, on North Main Street in Providence, Rhode Island from 1926 through 1972, when the team affiliated with the New York Rangers and moved into the newly built Providence Civic Center. The team name came from the state bird, a rooster known as the Rhode Island Red. They moved to New York in 1977, then to Connecticut in 1997, and are now called the Hartford Wolf Pack.

The Reds are the oldest continuously operating minor-league hockey franchise in North America, having fielded a team in one form or another since 1926 in the CAHL. It is also the only AHL franchise to have never missed a season. The AHL returned to Providence in 1992 in the form of the Providence Bruins.

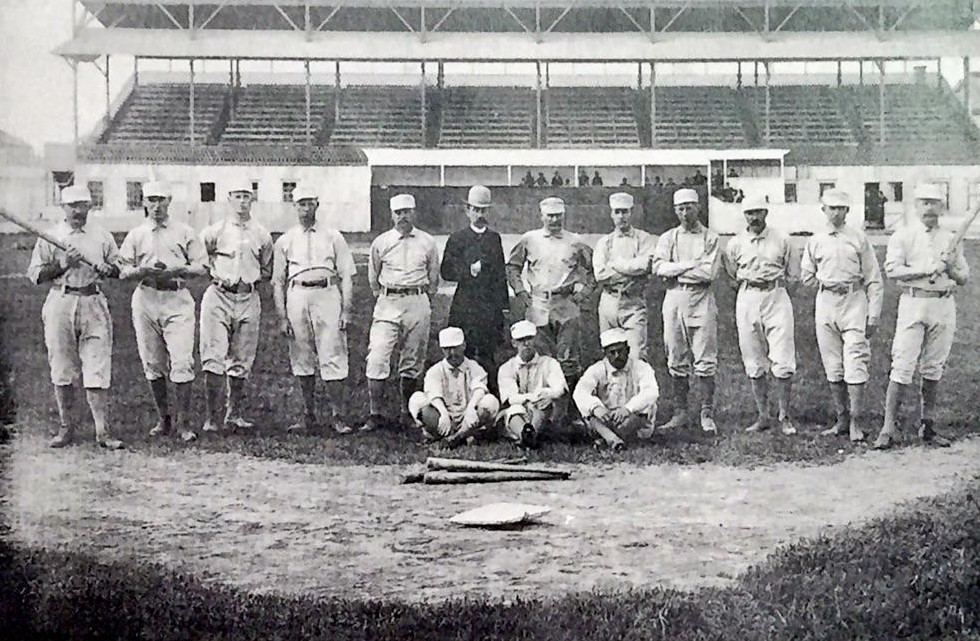
1884 Baseball Champion Providence Grays

Before the great expansion of athletic teams all over the country, Providence and Rhode Island in general played a great role in supporting teams. The Providence Grays won the first World Championship in baseball history in 1884. The team played their home games at the old Messer Street Field in Providence. The Grays played in the National League from 1878 to 1885. They defeated the New York Metropolitans of the American Association in a best of five-game series at the Polo Grounds in New York. Providence won three straight games to become the first champions in major league baseball history. Babe Ruth played for the minor league Providence Grays of 1914 and hit his only official minor league home run for them before the Grays' parent club, the Boston Red Stockings, recalled him.

Rhode Island has deep history with the sport of soccer where the sport was played as early as 1886 when the state's first organized league would be founded, known as the Rhode Island Football Association (RIFA). One of their teams, the Pawtucket Free Wanderers, would establish themselves as a regional power and win the American Cup in 1893. The first championship game of the U.S. Open Cup was also held in 1914 in Pawtucket's Coates Field to a crowd of 10,000. Later, a team known as Pawtucket Rangers F.C. would win the 1941 edition of the U.S. Open Cup (then National Challenge Cup). The Rhode Island Oceaneers would later be founded, and went on to win the 1974 American Soccer League championship. Other former semiprofessional soccer teams of the modern era include the Rhode Island Stingrays of the USL Premier Development League, and the Rhode Island Reds of the National Premier Soccer League, with both leagues regarded as the fourth tier of American soccer.

The now-defunct professional football team known as the Providence Steamrollers won the 1928 NFL title. They played in a 10,000 person stadium called the Cycledrome. An unrelated basketball team also known as the Providence Steamrollers played in the Basketball Association of America, which would become the National Basketball Association.

Rhode Island's only rugby league team was the Rhode Island Rebellion, a semi-professional team that was a founding member of the USA Rugby League, which was at the time the top competition in the United States for the sport of rugby league. The Rebellion played their home games at Classical High School in Providence.

===== Current professional teams =====
Professional Team	League	Sport	Venue	City	Established	Championships
Providence Bruins	American Hockey League (AHL)	Ice hockey	Amica Mutual Pavilion	Providence, Rhode Island	1987	1
Rhode Island FC	USL Championship (USLC)	Soccer	Centreville Bank Stadium	Pawtucket, Rhode Island	2024	0
Rhode Island UFL team	United Football League (UFL)	American football	Centreville Bank Stadium	Pawtucket, Rhode Island	2027	0

===== Current semi-professional teams =====
Semi-Professional Team	League	Sport	Venue	City	Established	Championships
Rhode Island Rogues	Women's Premier Soccer League (WPSL)	Soccer	Roger Williams University	Bristol, Rhode Island	2018	0

==== Collegiate and amateur sports ====
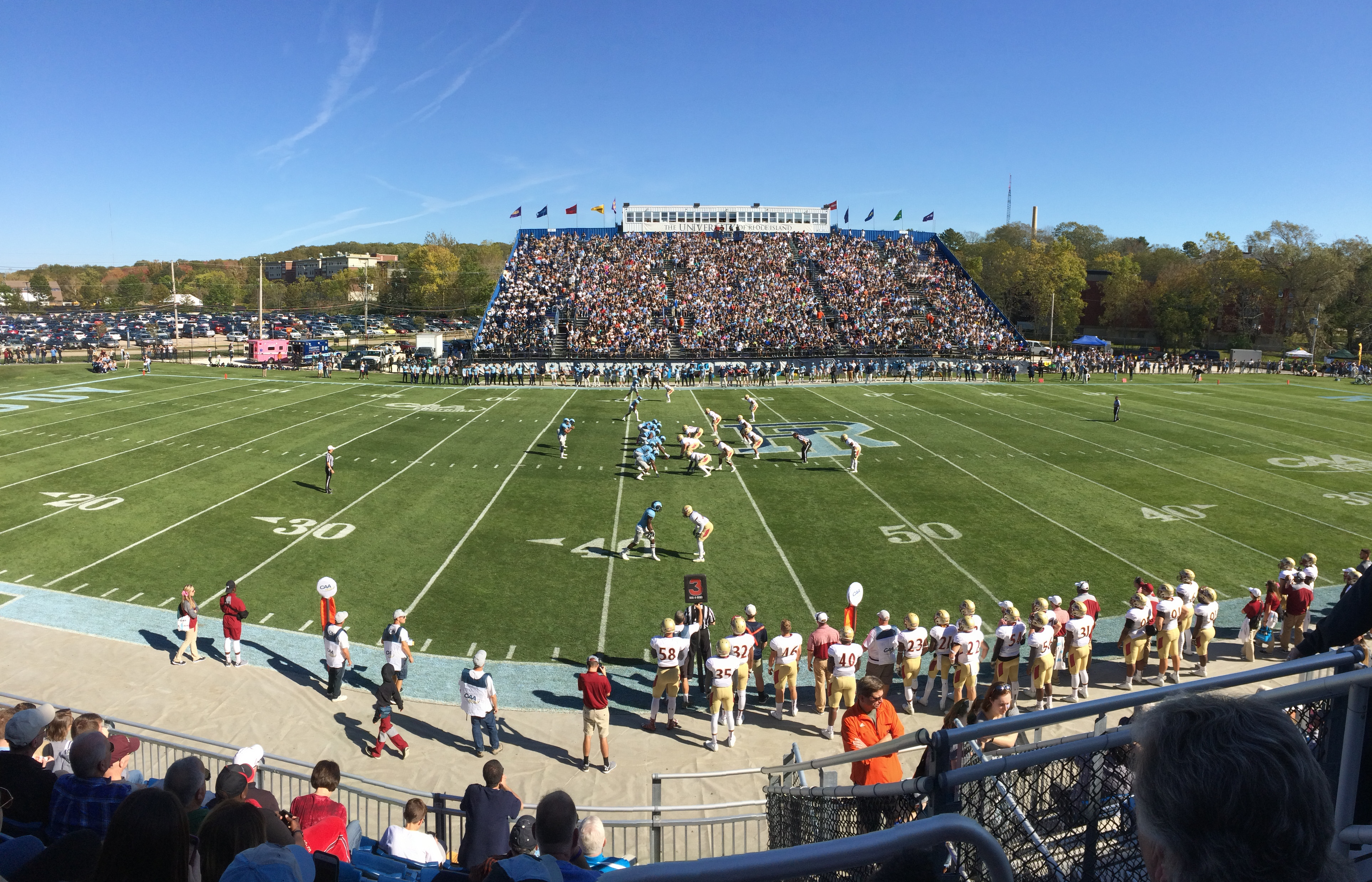
University of Rhode Island's Meade Stadium in Kingston

There are four NCAA Division I schools in Rhode Island. All four schools compete in different conferences. The Brown University Bears compete in the Ivy League, the Bryant University Bulldogs compete in the America East Conference, the Providence College Friars compete in the Big East Conference, and the University of Rhode Island Rams compete in the Atlantic 10 Conference. Three of the schools' football teams compete in the Football Championship Subdivision, the second-highest level of college football in the United States. Brown plays FCS football in the Ivy League, Bryant plays FCS football in the Big South Conference before that league merges its football operations with those of the Ohio Valley Conference in 2023, and Rhode Island plays FCS football in CAA Football, the technically separate football league of the Colonial Athletic Association. All four Division I schools in the state compete in an intrastate all-sports competition known as the Ocean State Cup, with Bryant winning the most recent cup in 2011–12 academic year.

From 1930 to 1983, America's Cup races were sailed off Newport, and the extreme-sport X Games and Gravity Games were founded and hosted in the state's capital city.

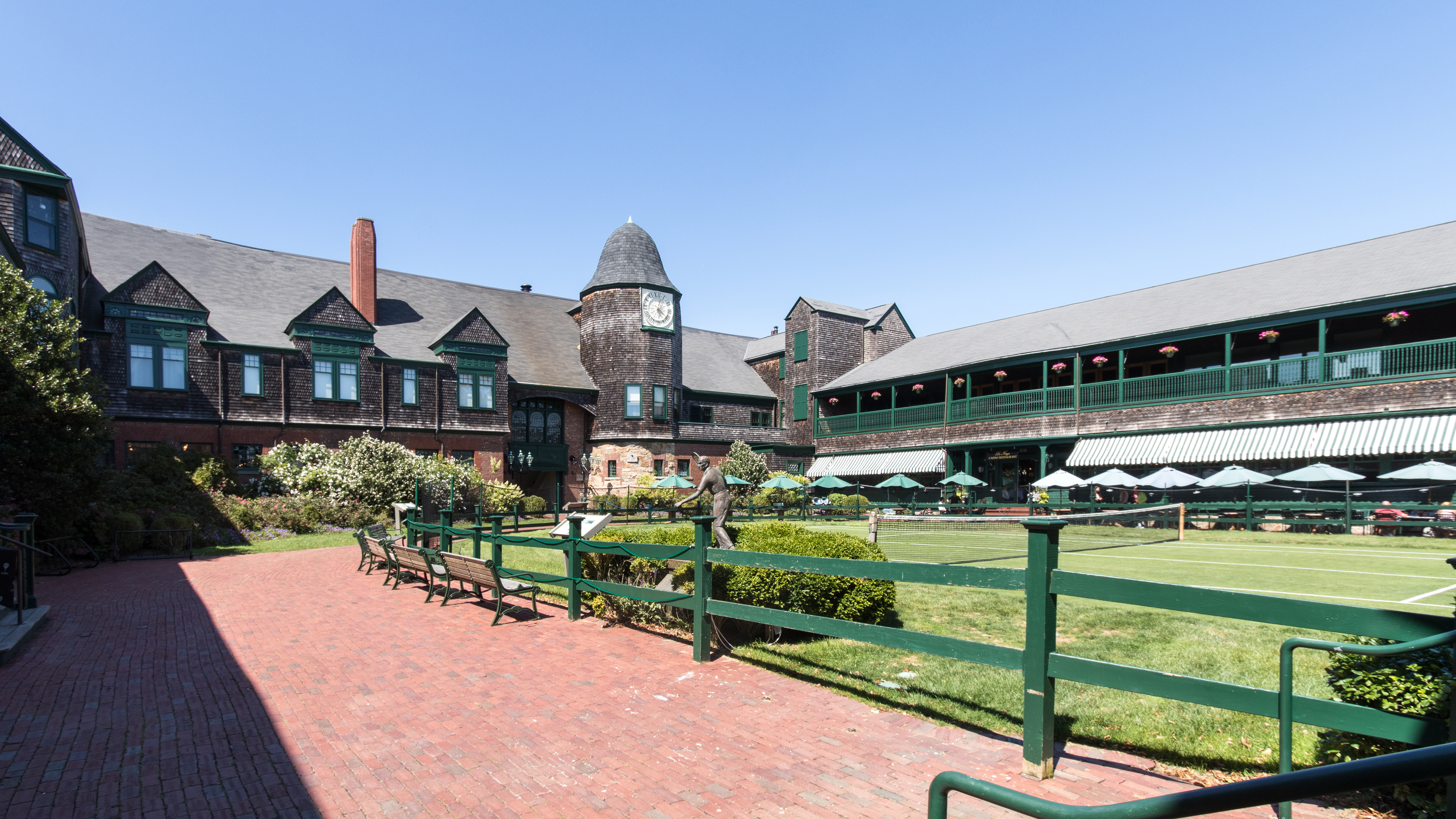
The International Tennis Hall of Fame in Newport

The International Tennis Hall of Fame is in Newport at the Newport Casino, site of the first U.S. National Championships in 1881. The Hall of Fame and Museum were established in 1954 by Jimmy Van Alen as "a shrine to the ideals of the game".

Rhode Island is also home to the headquarters of the governing body for youth rugby league in the United States, the American Youth Rugby League Association or AYRLA. The AYRLA has started the first-ever rugby league youth competition in Providence Middle Schools, a program at the RI Training School, in addition to starting the first high school competition in the US in Providence Public High School.

=== Vermont ===
==== Winter sports ====
Winter sports are popular in New England, and Vermont's winter sports attractions are a big part of Vermont tourism. Some well known attractions include Burke Mountain ski area, Jay Peak Resort, Killington Ski Resort, Stowe Mountain Resort, the Quechee Club Ski Area, and Smugglers' Notch Resort.

Vermont natives in the snowboarding profession include Kevin Pearce, Ross Powers, Hannah Teter, and Kelly Clark. Others learned snowboarding in the state, such as Louie Vito and Ellery Hollingsworth.

Vermont Olympic gold medalists include Barbara Cochran, Hannah Kearney, Kelly Clark, Ross Powers, and Hannah Teter.

==== Baseball ====
The largest professional franchise is the Vermont Lake Monsters, a single-A minor league baseball affiliate of the Oakland Athletics, based in Burlington. They were named the Vermont Expos before 2006. Up until the 2011 season, they were the affiliate of the Washington Nationals (formerly the Montreal Expos).

==== Basketball ====
Currently the highest-ranked teams in basketball representing Vermont are the NCAA's Vermont Catamounts – male and female.

The Vermont Frost Heaves, the 2007 and 2008 American Basketball Association national champions, were a franchise of the Premier Basketball League, and were based in Barre and Burlington from the fall of 2006 through the winter of 2011.

==== Football ====
The Vermont Bucks, an indoor football team, were based in Burlington and began play in 2017 as the founding team in the Can-Am Indoor Football League. For 2018, the Bucks joined the American Arena League, but folded prior to playing in the new league.

==== Hockey ====
Vermont is home to the University of Vermont Men's and Women's hockey teams. Vermont's only professional hockey team was the Vermont Wild who played in the Federal Hockey League during the 2011–12 season, but the team folded before the season ended.

==== Soccer ====
The Vermont Voltage were a USL Premier Development League soccer club that played in St. Albans.

Annually since 2002, high school statewide all stars compete against New Hampshire in ten sports during "Twin State" playoffs.

==== Motorsport ====
Vermont also has a few auto racing venues. The most popular of them is Thunder Road International Speedbowl in Barre, Vermont. It is well known for its tight racing and has become well known in short track stock car racing. Other racing circuits include the USC sanctioned Bear Ridge Speedway, and the NASCAR sanctioned Devil's Bowl Speedway. Some NASCAR Cup drivers have come to Vermont circuits to compete against local weekly drivers such as Tony Stewart, Clint Bowyer, Kevin Harvick, Kenny Wallace, and Joe Nemechek. Kevin Lepage from Shelburne, Vermont is one of a few professional drivers from Vermont. Racing series in Vermont include NASCAR Whelen All-American Series, American Canadian Tour, and Vermont's own Tiger Sportsman Series.

=== Washington, D.C. ===
Capital One Arena in the city's Chinatown section hosts the Washington Capitals, an NHL team (pictured), and the Washington Wizards, an NBA team

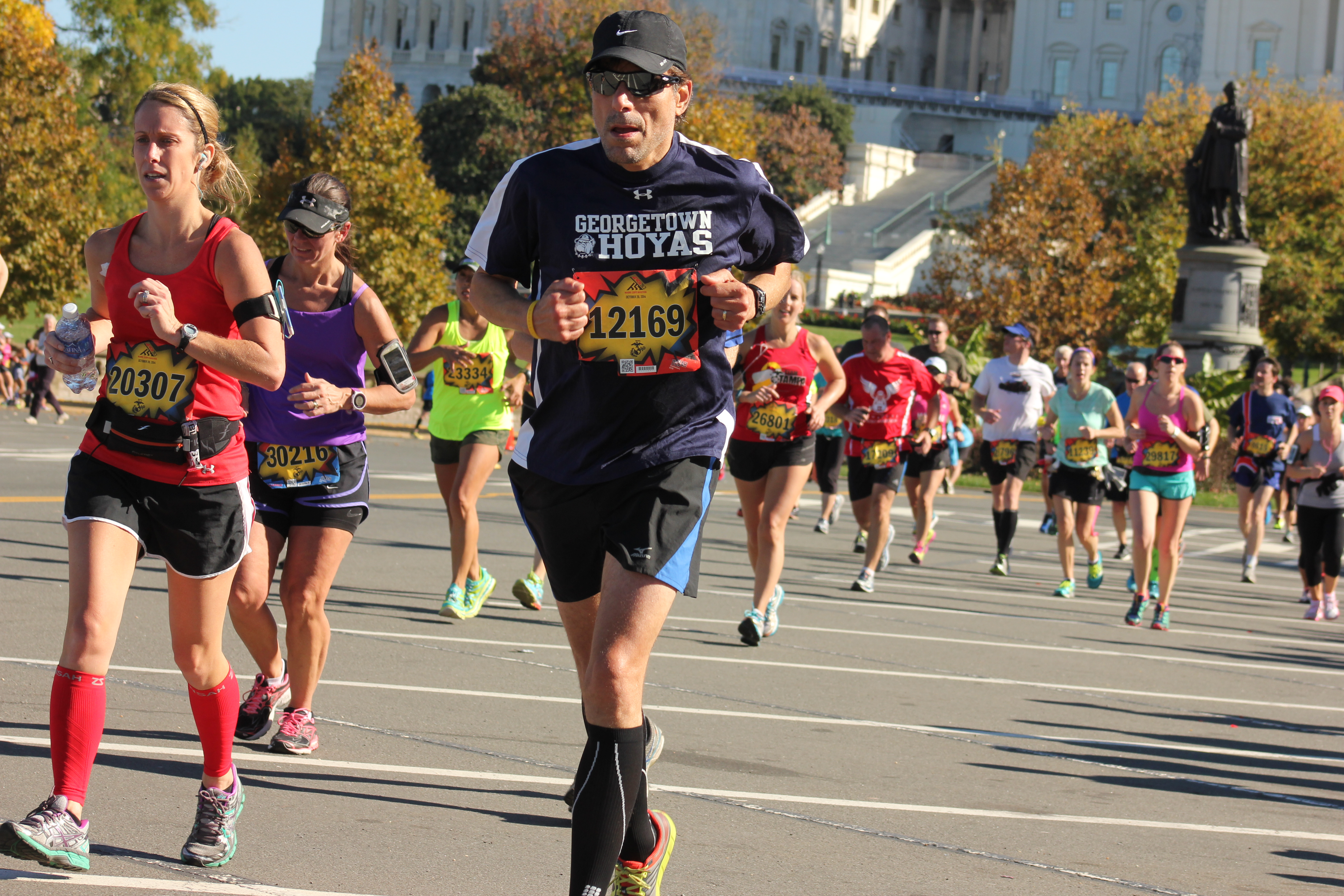
With over 30,000 participants as of 2024, the annual Marine Corps Marathon, held annually in October in Washington, D.C. and Arlington County, is the largest non-prize money marathon in the country.

Washington, D.C., has four major professional men's sports teams and two major professional women's teams. The Washington Nationals of Major League Baseball are the most popular sports team in the district, as of 2019. They play at Nationals Park, which opened in 2008. The Washington Commanders (previously Redskins) of the National Football League play at Northwest Stadium in nearby Landover, Maryland. The Washington Wizards (previously Bullets) of the National Basketball Association and the Washington Capitals of the National Hockey League play at Capital One Arena. The Washington Mystics of the Women's National Basketball Association play at CareFirst Arena. D.C. United of Major League Soccer and the Washington Spirit of the National Women's Soccer League play at Audi Field.

The city's teams have won a combined 14 professional league championships over their respective histories. The Washington Commanders have won two NFL Championships and three Super Bowls; D.C. United has won four; and the Washington Wizards, Washington Capitals, Washington Mystics, Washington Nationals, and Washington Spirit have each won a single championship.

Other professional and semi-professional teams in Washington, D.C. include the DC Defenders of the XFL, Old Glory DC of Major League Rugby, the Washington Kastles of World TeamTennis, and the D.C. Divas of the Independent Women's Football League. The William H.G. FitzGerald Tennis Center in Rock Creek Park hosts the Washington Open, a joint men's ATP Tour 500- and women's WTA Tour 500-level tennis tournament, every summer in late July and early August. Washington, D.C. has two major annual marathon races, the Marine Corps Marathon, held every autumn, and the Rock 'n' Roll USA Marathon, held each spring. The Marine Corps Marathon began in 1976 and is sometimes called "The People's Marathon" because it is the largest marathon that does not offer prize money to participants.

The district's four NCAA Division I teams are the American Eagles of American University, George Washington Revolutionaries of George Washington University, the Georgetown Hoyas of Georgetown University, and the Howard Bison and Lady Bison of Howard University. The Georgetown men's basketball team is the most notable and also plays at Capital One Arena. Washington, D.C. area's regional sports television network is Monumental Sports Network.

== Midwest ==
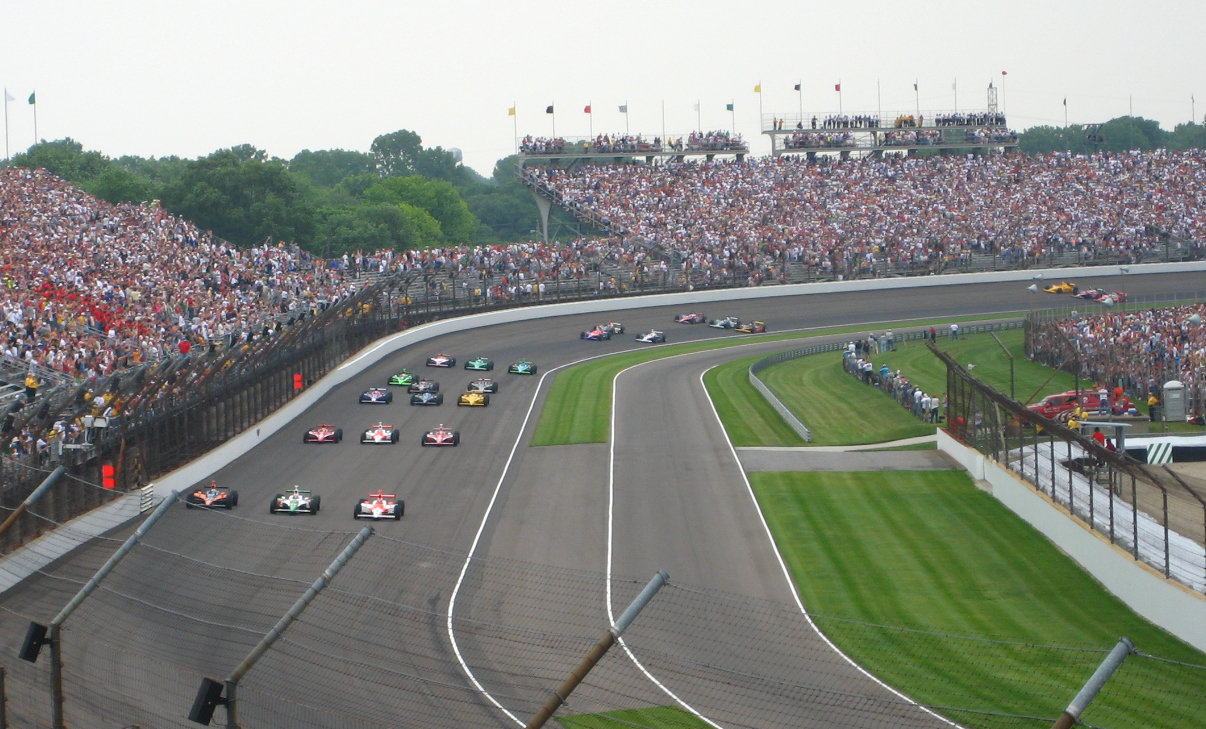
The 2007 Indianapolis 500 at Indianapolis Motor Speedway

Professional sports leagues such as the National Football League (NFL), Major League Baseball (MLB), National Basketball Association (NBA), Women's National Basketball Association (WNBA), National Hockey League (NHL), Major League Soccer (MLS), and National Women's Soccer League (NWSL), have team franchises in following Midwestern cities:

- Chicago: Bears (NFL), Cubs, White Sox (MLB), Bulls (NBA), Sky (WNBA), Blackhawks (NHL), Fire (MLS), Stars (NWSL)
- Cincinnati: Bengals (NFL), Reds (MLB), FC Cincinnati (MLS)
- Cleveland: Browns (NFL), Guardians (MLB), Cavaliers (NBA)
- Columbus: Blue Jackets (NHL), Crew (MLS)
- Detroit: Lions (NFL), Tigers (MLB), Pistons (NBA), Red Wings (NHL)
- Green Bay: Packers (NFL)
- Indianapolis: Colts (NFL), Pacers (NBA), Fever (WNBA)
- Kansas City: Chiefs (NFL), Royals (MLB), Sporting or the Wizards (MLS), Current (NWSL)
- Milwaukee: Brewers (MLB), Bucks (NBA)
- Minneapolis–Saint Paul: Vikings (NFL), Twins (MLB), Timberwolves (NBA), Lynx (WNBA), Wild (NHL), United or the Loons (MLS)
- St. Louis: Cardinals (MLB), Blues (NHL), City SC (MLS)

Popular teams include the St. Louis Cardinals (11 World Series titles), Cincinnati Reds (5 World Series titles), Chicago Bulls (6 NBA titles), the Detroit Pistons (3 NBA titles), Milwaukee Bucks (2 NBA titles), the Minnesota Lynx (4 WNBA titles), the Green Bay Packers (4 Super Bowl titles, 13 total NFL championships), the Chicago Bears (1 Super Bowl title, 9 total NFL championships), the Cleveland Browns (4 AAFC championships, 4 NFL championships), the Kansas City Chiefs (3 Super Bowl titles, 4 total NFL championships), Kansas City Royals (2 World Series titles), the Detroit Red Wings (11 Stanley Cup titles), the Detroit Tigers (4 World Series titles), the Chicago Blackhawks (6 Stanley Cup titles), and the Columbus Crew (3 MLS Cups).

In NCAA college sports, the Big Ten Conference and the Big 12 Conference feature the largest concentration of top Midwestern Division I football and men's and women's basketball teams in the region, including the Cincinnati Bearcats, Illinois Fighting Illini, Indiana Hoosiers, Iowa Hawkeyes, Iowa State Cyclones, Kansas Jayhawks, Kansas State Wildcats, Michigan Wolverines, Michigan State Spartans, Minnesota Golden Gophers, Nebraska Cornhuskers, Northwestern Wildcats, Ohio State Buckeyes, Purdue Boilermakers, and the Wisconsin Badgers. Other notable Midwestern college sports teams include the Akron Zips, Ball State Cardinals, Butler Bulldogs, Creighton Bluejays, Central Michigan Chippewas Dayton Flyers, Grand Valley State Lakers, Indiana State Sycamores, Kent State Golden Flashes, Marquette Golden Eagles, Miami RedHawks, Milwaukee Panthers, Missouri Tigers, Missouri State Bears, Northern Illinois Huskies, North Dakota State Bison, Notre Dame Fighting Irish, Ohio Bobcats, South Dakota State Jackrabbits, Toledo Rockets, Western Michigan Broncos, Wichita State Shockers, and Xavier Musketeers. Of this second group of schools, Butler, Dayton, Indiana State, Missouri State, North Dakota State, and South Dakota State do not play top-level college football (all playing in the second-tier Division I FCS), and Creighton, Marquette, Milwaukee, Wichita State and Xavier do not sponsor football at all.

The Milwaukee Mile hosted its first automobile race in 1903, and is one of the oldest tracks in the world, though as of 2019 is presently inactive. The Indianapolis Motor Speedway, opened in 1909, is a prestigious auto racing track which annually hosts the internationally famous Indianapolis 500-Mile Race (part of the IndyCar series), the Brickyard 400 (NASCAR), and the IndyCar Grand Prix (IndyCar series). The Road America and Mid-Ohio road courses opened in the 1950s and 1960s respectively. Other motorsport venues in the Midwest are Indianapolis Raceway Park (home of the NHRA U.S. Nationals), Michigan International Speedway, Chicagoland Speedway, Kansas Speedway, Gateway International Raceway, and the Iowa Speedway. The Kentucky Speedway is just outside the officially defined Midwest, but is linked with the region because the track is located in the Cincinnati metropolitan area.

Notable professional golf tournaments in the Midwest include the Memorial Tournament, BMW Championship and John Deere Classic.

=== Illinois ===
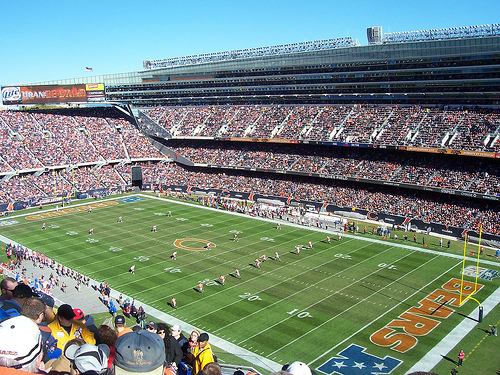
Soldier Field is home to the National Football League's Chicago Bears

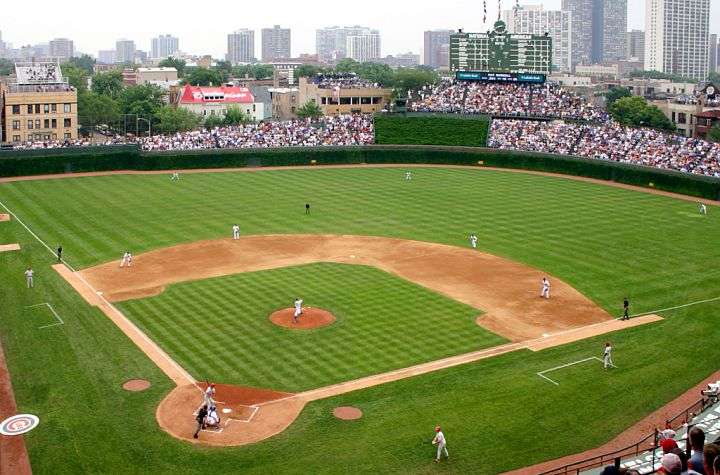
Wrigley Field is home to Major League Baseball's Chicago Cubs

As one of the United States' major metropolises, all major sports leagues have teams headquartered in Chicago.

Two Major League Baseball teams are located in the state. The Chicago Cubs of the National League play in the second-oldest major league stadium, Wrigley Field, and went the longest length of time without a championship in all of major American sport, from 1908 to 2016, when they won the World Series. The Chicago White Sox of the American League won the World Series in 2005, their first since 1917. They play on the city's south side at Rate Field. The Chicago Bears football team has won nine total NFL Championships, the last occurring in Super Bowl XX on January 26, 1986. The Chicago Bulls of the NBA is one of the most recognized basketball teams in the world, largely as a result of the efforts of Michael Jordan, who led the team to six NBA championships in eight seasons in the 1990s. The Chicago Blackhawks of the NHL began playing in 1926 and became a member of the Original Six once the NHL dropped to that number of teams during World War II. The Blackhawks have won six Stanley Cups, most recently in 2015. Chicago Fire FC is a member of MLS and has been one of the league's most successful and best-supported clubs since its founding in 1997, winning one league and four Lamar Hunt U.S. Open Cups in that timespan. The team played in Bridgeview, adjacent to Chicago from 2006 to 2019. The team now plays at Soldier Field in Chicago.

Chicago Stars FC, known in the past as the Chicago Red Stars, has played at the top level of U.S. women's soccer since its formation in 2009, except in the 2011 season. The team currently plays in the National Women's Soccer League at Martin Stadium on the campus of Northwestern University. The Chicago Sky have played in the Women's National Basketball Association (WNBA) since 2006. The Sky won their first WNBA Championship in 2021. They play at Wintrust Arena in Chicago. The Chicago Bandits of the NPF, a women's softball league, have won four league titles, most recently in 2016. They play at Parkway Bank Sports Complex in Rosemont, Illinois, in the Chicago area.

Many minor league teams also call Illinois their home. They include the Bloomington Edge of the Indoor Football League, Bloomington Flex of the Midwest Professional Basketball Association, Chicago Dogs of the American Association of Professional Baseball, Chicago Fire FC II of MLS Next Pro, Chicago Wolves of the American Hockey League, Gateway Grizzlies of the Frontier League, Kane County Cougars of the American Association, Joliet Slammers of the Frontier League, Peoria Chiefs of the Midwest League, Peoria Rivermen of the SPHL, Rockford Aviators of the Frontier League, Rockford IceHogs of the AHL, Schaumburg Boomers of the Frontier League, Southern Illinois Miners in the Frontier League, Windy City Bulls of the NBA G League, and Windy City ThunderBolts of the Frontier League.

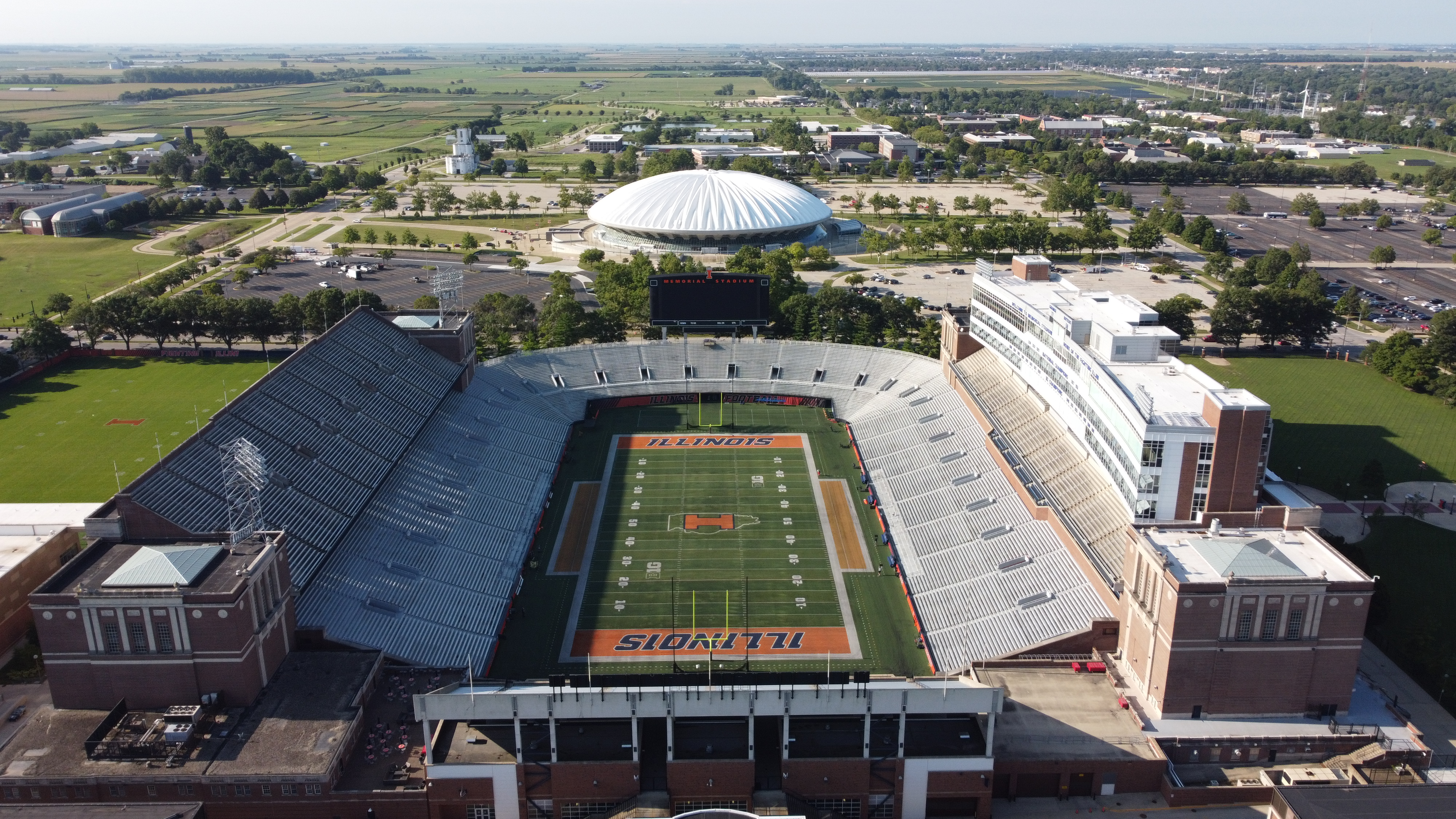
Gies Memorial Stadium and State Farm Center at the University of Illinois Urbana-Champaign

The state features 13 athletic programs that compete in NCAA Division I, the highest level of U.S. college sports. The two most prominent are the Illinois Fighting Illini and Northwestern Wildcats, both members of the Big Ten Conference and the only ones competing in the "Power Four conferences". The Fighting Illini football team has won five national championships and three Rose Bowl Games, whereas the men's basketball team has won 17 conference seasons and played five Final Fours. Meanwhile, the Wildcats have won eight football conference championships and one Rose Bowl Game. The Northern Illinois Huskies returned to the Horizon League in 2026 after an absence of nearly 30 years; with that conference not sponsoring football, the Huskies moved that sport to the Mountain West Conference. During their most recent tenure in the Mid-American Conference (1997–2026), the Huskies won four conference championships and earning a bid in the Orange Bowl. Five schools have football programs that compete in the second level of Division I football, the Football Championship Subdivision. The Illinois State Redbirds and Southern Illinois Salukis are members of the Missouri Valley Conference for non-football sports and the Missouri Valley Football Conference. The Eastern Illinois Panthers and Western Illinois Leathernecks are members of the Ohio Valley Conference. The Chicago State Cougars are playing their first season of varsity football in 2026 as an FCS independent; after that season, the football team will join the rest of the Cougars' sports in the NEC (historically known as the Northeast Conference). The city of Chicago is home to three Division I programs that do not sponsor football: the DePaul Blue Demons of the Big East Conference, Loyola Ramblers of the Atlantic 10 Conference, and UIC Flames of the Missouri Valley Conference. Finally, two non-football Division I programs are located downstate. The Bradley Braves are Missouri Valley Conference members, and the SIU Edwardsville Cougars compete in the Ohio Valley Conference.

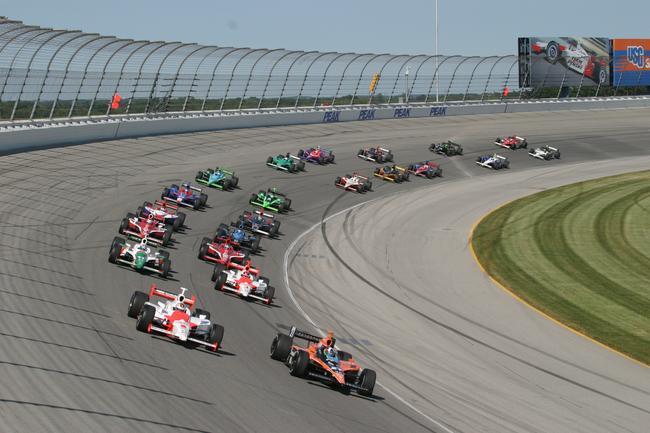
Chicagoland Speedway

Motor racing oval tracks at the Chicagoland Speedway in Joliet, the Chicago Motor Speedway in Cicero and the Gateway Motorsports Park in Madison, near St. Louis, have hosted NASCAR, CART, and IRL races, whereas the Sports Car Club of America, among other national and regional road racing clubs, have visited the Autobahn Country Club in Joliet, the Blackhawk Farms Raceway in South Beloit and the former Meadowdale International Raceway in Carpentersville. Illinois also has several short tracks and dragstrips. The dragstrip at Gateway International Raceway and the Route 66 Raceway, which sits on the same property as the Chicagoland Speedway, both host NHRA drag races.

Illinois features several golf courses, such as Olympia Fields, Medinah, Midlothian, Cog Hill, and Conway Farms, which have often hosted the BMW Championship, Western Open, and Women's Western Open. Also, the state has hosted 13 editions of the U.S. Open (latest at Olympia Fields in 2003), six editions of the PGA Championship (latest at Medinah in 2006), three editions of the U.S. Women's Open (latest at The Merit Club), the 2009 Solheim Cup (at Rich Harvest Farms), and the 2012 Ryder Cup (at Medinah). The John Deere Classic is a regular PGA Tour event played in the Quad Cities since 1971, whereas the Encompass Championship is a Champions Tour event since 2013. Previously, the LPGA State Farm Classic was an LPGA Tour event from 1976 to 2011.

=== Indiana ===
==== Motorsports ====
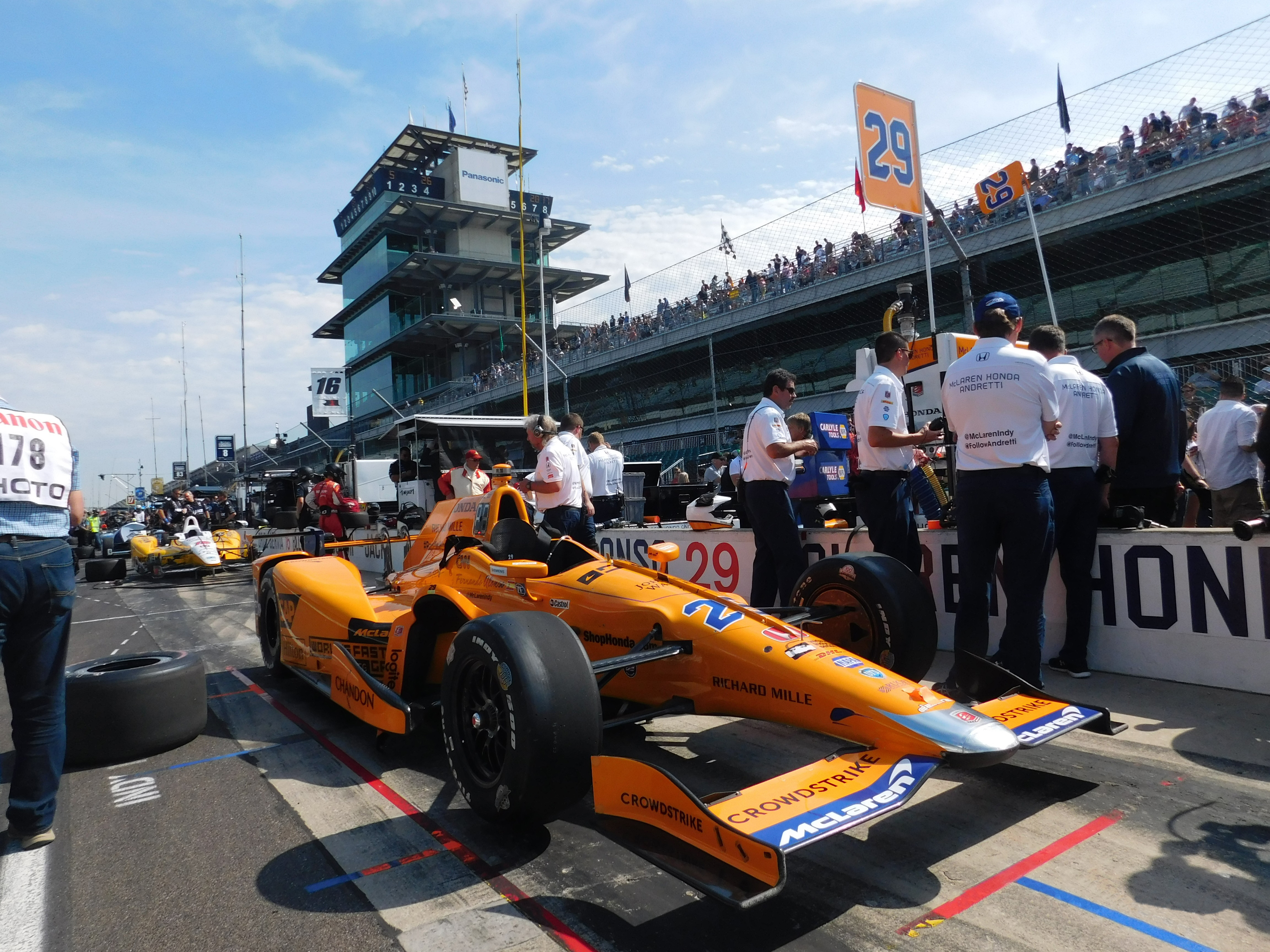
Indianapolis is home to the annual Indianapolis 500 race.

Indiana has an extensive history with auto racing. Indianapolis hosts the Indianapolis 500 mile race over Memorial Day weekend at the Indianapolis Motor Speedway every May. The name of the race is usually shortened to "Indy 500" and also goes by the nickname "The Greatest Spectacle in Racing". The race attracts more than 350,000 people every year, making it the largest single-day sporting event in the world. The track also hosts the Brickyard 400 (NASCAR) and the Red Bull Indianapolis Grand Prix. From 2000 to 2007, it hosted the United States Grand Prix (Formula One). Indiana features the world's largest and most prestigious drag race, the NHRA Mac Tools U.S. Nationals, held each Labor Day weekend at Lucas Oil Raceway at Indianapolis in Clermont, Indiana. Indiana is also host to a major unlimited hydroplane racing power boat race circuits in the major H1 Unlimited league, the Madison Regatta (Madison, Indiana).

==== Professional sports ====
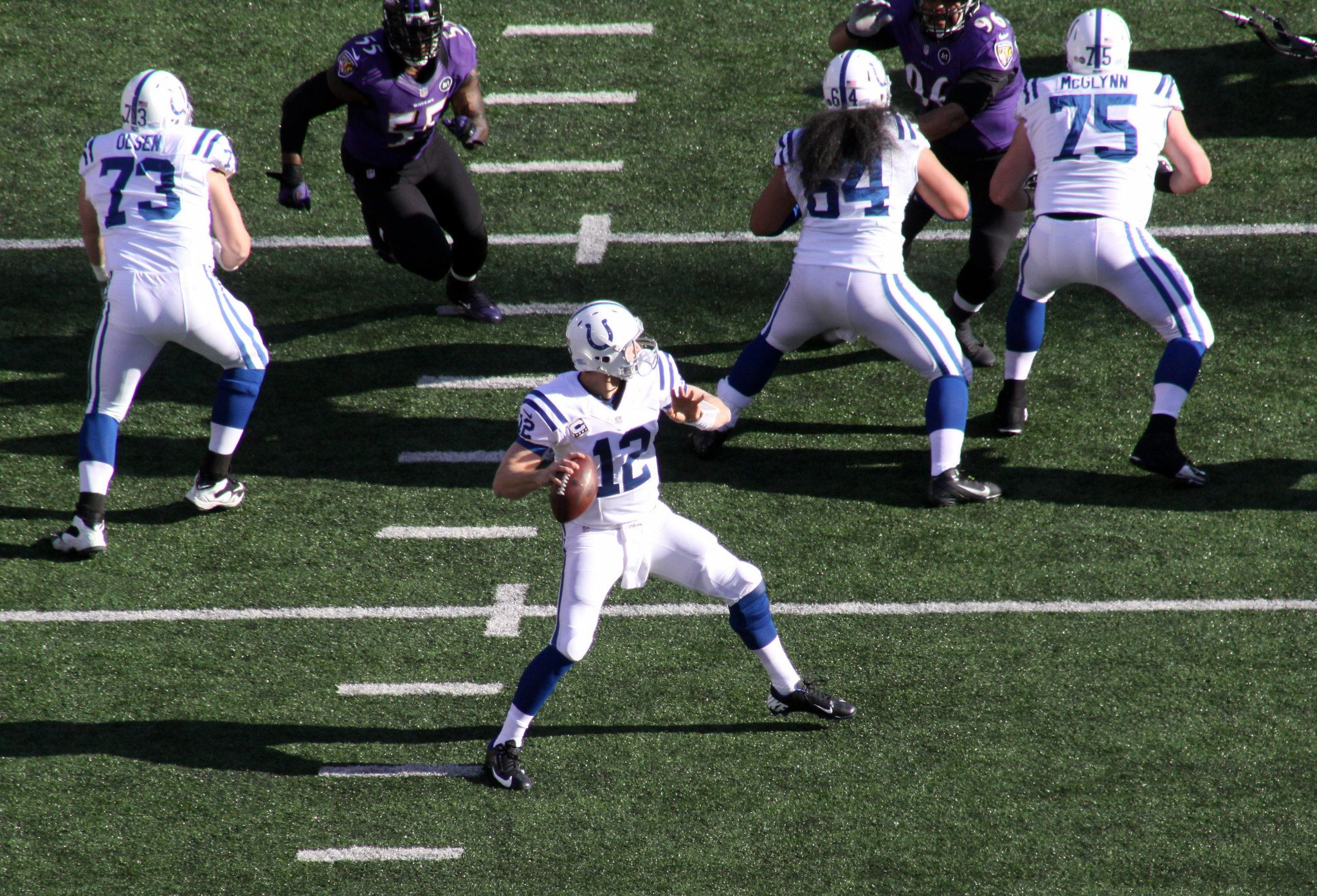
The Indianapolis Colts of the National Football League have been based in the state since 1984.

As of 2013 Indiana has produced more National Basketball Association (NBA) players per capita than any other state. Muncie has produced the most per capita of any American city, with two other Indiana cities in the top ten. It has a rich basketball heritage that reaches back to the sport's formative years. The NBA's Indiana Pacers play their home games at Gainbridge Fieldhouse; they began play in 1967 in the American Basketball Association (ABA) and joined the NBA when the leagues merged in 1976. Although James Naismith developed basketball in Springfield, Massachusetts in 1891, high school basketball was born in Indiana. In 1925, Naismith visited an Indiana basketball state finals game along with 15,000 screaming fans and later wrote "Basketball really had its origin in Indiana, which remains the center of the sport." The 1986 film Hoosiers is inspired by the story of the 1954 Indiana state champions Milan High School. Professional basketball player Larry Bird was born in West Baden Springs and was raised in French Lick. He went on to lead the Boston Celtics to the NBA championship in 1981, 1984, and 1986.

Indianapolis is home to the Indianapolis Colts. The Colts are members of the South Division of the American Football Conference. The Colts have roots back to 1913 as the Dayton Triangles. They became an official team after moving to Baltimore, MD, in 1953. In 1984, the Colts relocated to Indianapolis, leading to an eventual rivalry with the Baltimore Ravens. After calling the RCA Dome home for 25 years, the Colts play their home games at Lucas Oil Stadium in Indianapolis. While in Baltimore, the Colts won Super Bowl V. In Indianapolis, the Colts won Super Bowl XLI, bringing the franchise total to two. In recent years the Colts have regularly competed in the NFL playoffs.

Indiana was home to two charter members of the National Football League teams, the Hammond Pros and the Muncie Flyers. Another early NFL franchise, the Evansville Crimson Giants spent two seasons in the league before folding.

==== Professional teams ====
The following table shows the professional sports teams in Indiana. Teams in italic are in major men's or women's professional leagues.

Club	Sport	League	Venue (capacity)
Indianapolis Colts	American football	National Football League	Lucas Oil Stadium (62,400)
Indiana Pacers	Basketball	National Basketball Association	Gainbridge Fieldhouse (18,165)
Evansville Otters	Baseball	Frontier League	Bosse Field (5,181)
Evansville Thunderbolts	Ice hockey	SPHL	Ford Center (9,000)
Fort Wayne Komets	Ice hockey	ECHL	Allen County War Memorial Coliseum (10,480)
Fort Wayne TinCaps	Baseball	Midwest League	Parkview Field (8,100)
Gary SouthShore RailCats	Baseball	American Association	U.S. Steel Yard (6,139)
Indiana Fever	Basketball	Women's National Basketball Association	Gainbridge Fieldhouse (18,165)
Noblesville Boom	Basketball	NBA G League	Riverview Health Arena at Innovation Mile (3,400)
Indy Eleven	Soccer	USL Championship	Michael A. Carroll Stadium (10,524)
Indy Fuel	Ice hockey	ECHL	Fishers Event Center (6,500)
Indy Ignite	Volleyball	Pro Volleyball Federation	Fishers Event Center (6,500)
Indianapolis Indians	Baseball	International League	Victory Field (14,230)
Indianapolis Enforcers	Arena football	AAL	Indiana Farmers Coliseum
South Bend Cubs	Baseball	Midwest League	Four Winds Field (5,000)

The following is a table of sports venues in Indiana having a capacity in excess of 30,000:

Facility	Capacity	Municipality	Tenants
Indianapolis Motor Speedway	257,327	Speedway	Indianapolis 500; Grand Prix of Indianapolis; Brantley Gilbert Big Machine Brickyard 400; Lilly Diabetes 250
Notre Dame Stadium	84,000	Notre Dame	Notre Dame Fighting Irish football
Lucas Oil Stadium	62,421	Indianapolis	Indianapolis Colts
Ross–Ade Stadium	57,236	West Lafayette	Purdue Boilermakers football
Memorial Stadium	52,929	Bloomington	Indiana Hoosiers football

==== College athletics ====
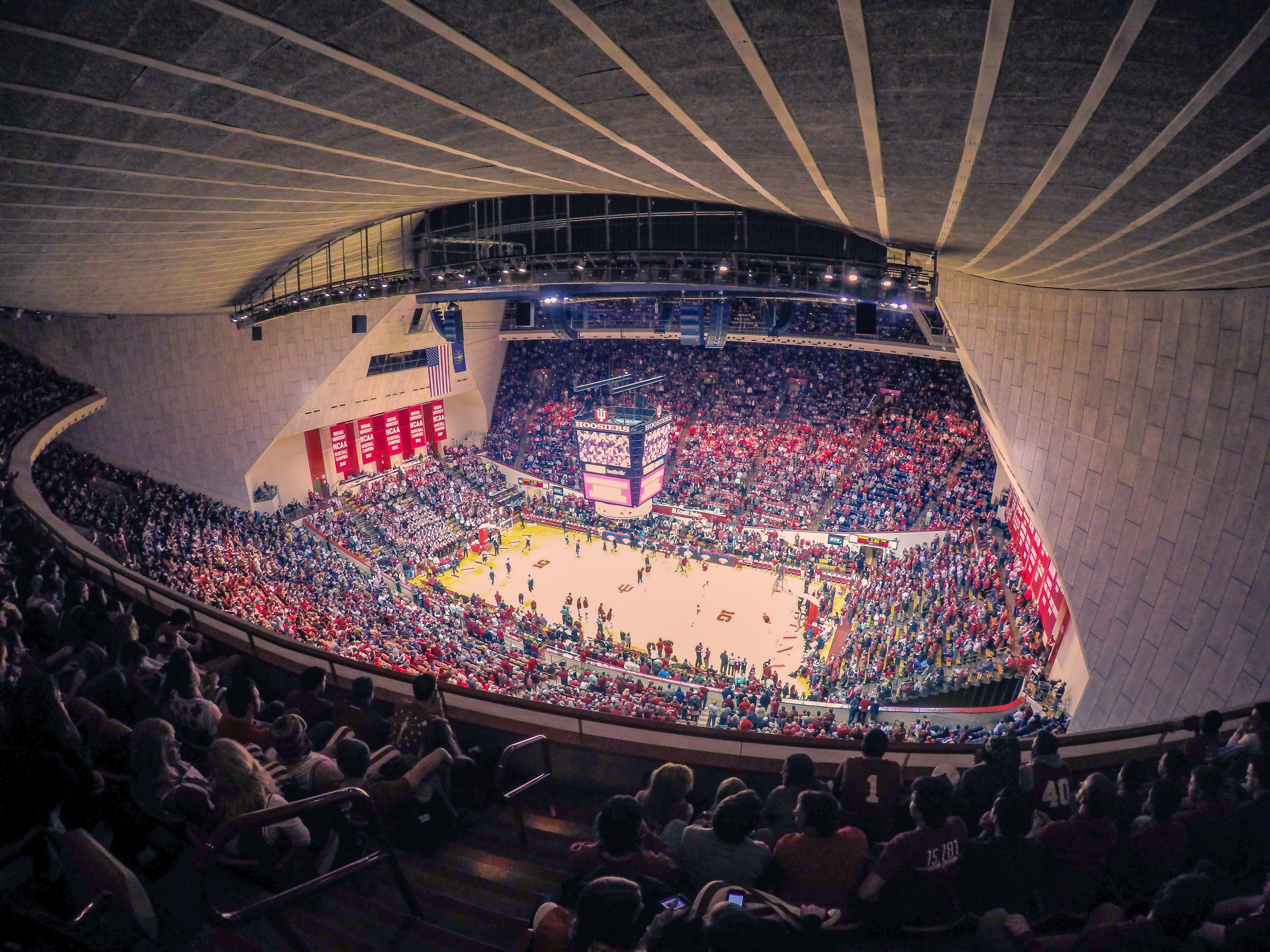
Simon Skjodt Assembly Hall, home to Indiana Hoosiers men's basketball

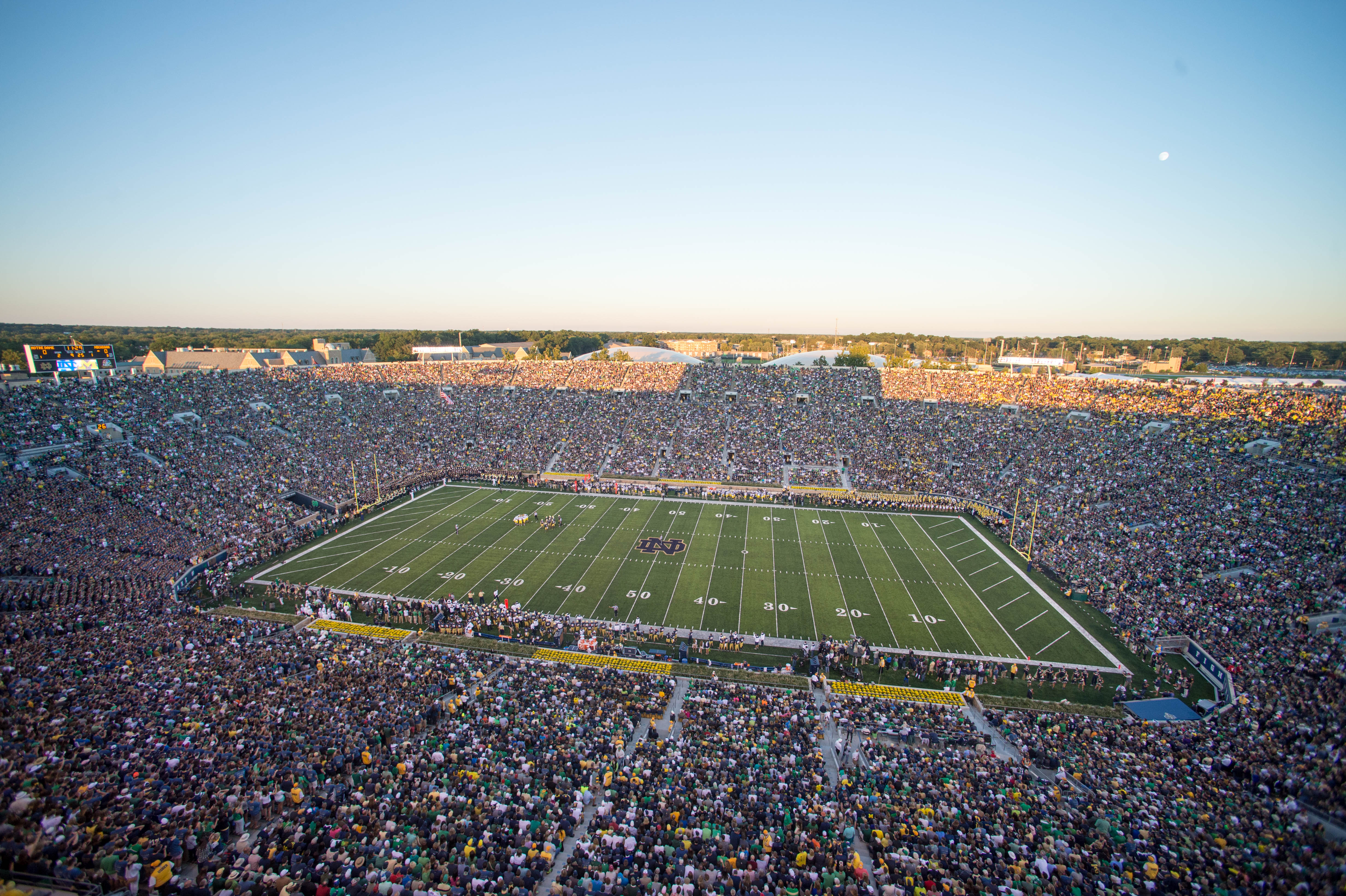
Notre Dame Stadium, home to the Fighting Irish

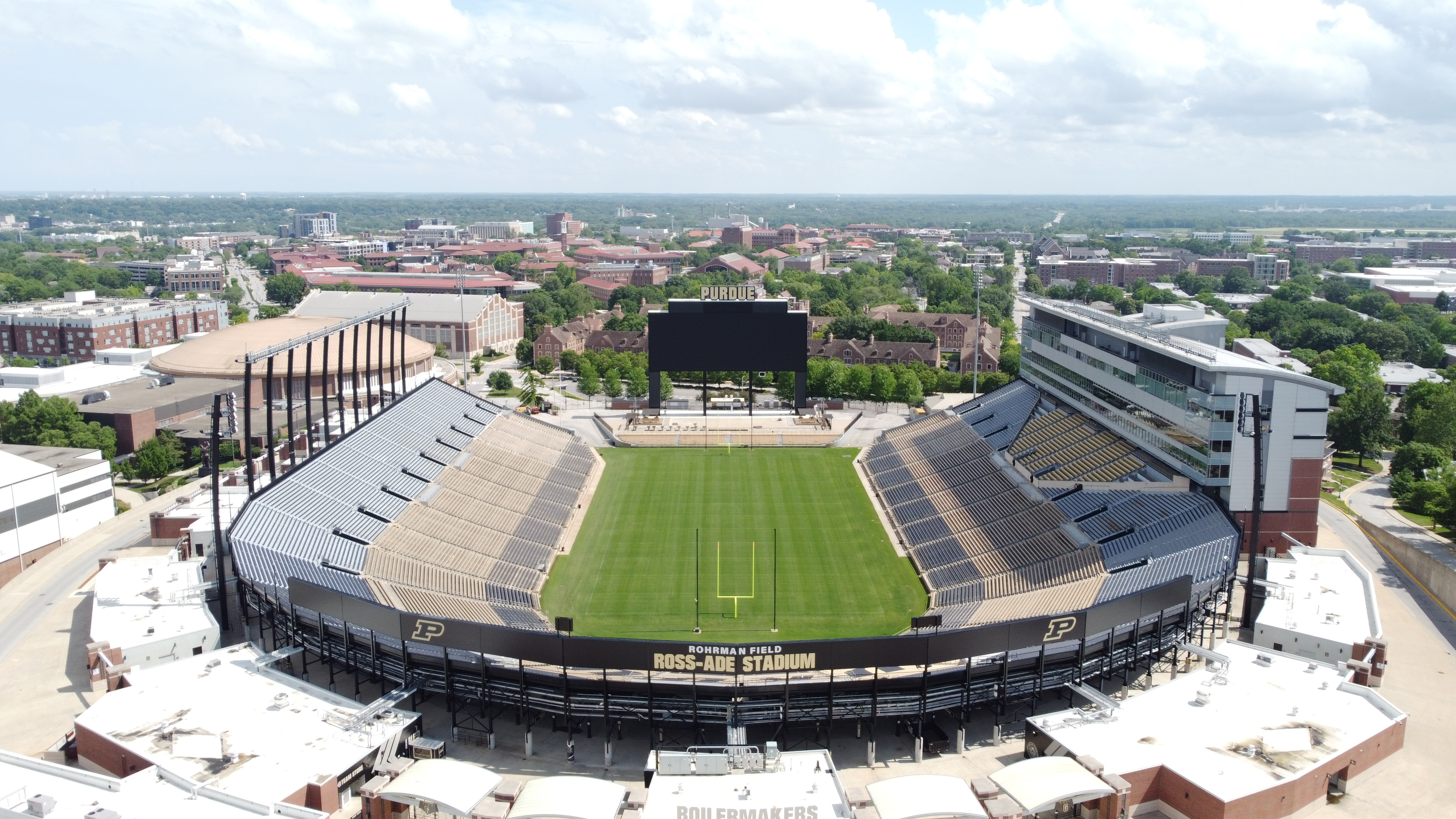
Ross-Ade Stadium, home of the Purdue Boilermakers, before the 2023 renovations

Eleven Indiana universities participate in NCAA Division I athletics, winning league and national championships over the years.

In men's basketball, the Indiana Hoosiers have won five NCAA national championships and 22 Big Ten Conference championships. The Purdue Boilermakers were selected as the national champions in 1932 before the creation of the tournament, and have won 26 Big Ten championships. The Boilermakers along with the Notre Dame Fighting Irish have both won a national championship in women's basketball.

In college football, the Notre Dame Fighting Irish have won 11 consensus national championships, as well as the Rose Bowl Game, Cotton Bowl Classic, Orange Bowl and Sugar Bowl. Meanwhile, the Purdue Boilermakers have won 10 Big Ten championships and have won the Rose Bowl and Peach Bowl. The Indiana Hoosiers football team, led by head coach Curt Cignetti, won the national championship in 2026.

Schools fielding NCAA Division I athletic programs include:

Program	Division	Conference	City
Ball State Cardinals	Division I FBS	Mid-American Conference; Missouri Valley Conference (men's swimming & diving); Midwestern Intercollegiate Volleyball Association (men's volleyball)	Muncie
Butler Bulldogs	Division I FCS	Big East Conference; Pioneer Football League	Indianapolis
Evansville Purple Aces	Division I (non-football)	Missouri Valley Conference	Evansville
Indiana Hoosiers	Division I FBS	Big Ten Conference; Mountain Pacific Sports Federation (women's water polo)	Bloomington
Indiana State Sycamores	Division I FCS	Missouri Valley Conference; Missouri Valley Football Conference	Terre Haute
IU Indy Jaguars	Division I (non-football)	Horizon League	Indianapolis
Notre Dame Fighting Irish	Division I FBS	Atlantic Coast Conference; Big Ten Conference (men's ice hockey); Independent (football)	South Bend
Purdue Boilermakers	Division I FBS	Big Ten Conference	West Lafayette
Purdue Fort Wayne Mastodons	Division I (non-football)	Horizon League; Midwestern Intercollegiate Volleyball Association (men's volleyball)	Fort Wayne
Southern Indiana Screaming Eagles	Division I (non-football)	Ohio Valley Conference; Summit League (swimming & diving); Horizon League (men's tennis)	Evansville
Valparaiso Beacons	Division I FCS	Missouri Valley Conference; Pioneer Football League; Conference USA (women's bowling)	Valparaiso

=== Iowa ===
The state has four major college teams playing in NCAA Division I for all sports. In football, Iowa State University and the University of Iowa compete in the Football Bowl Subdivision (FBS), whereas the University of Northern Iowa and Drake University compete in the Football Championship Subdivision (FCS), with the added distinction that UNI awards football scholarships and Drake does not. Although Iowa has no professional major league sports teams, Iowa has minor league sports teams in baseball, basketball, hockey, and other sports.

The following table shows the Iowa sports teams with average attendance over 8,000. All the following teams are NCAA Division I football, basketball, or wrestling teams:

Iowa sports teams (attendance > 8,000)
Team	Location	Avg. attendance	Season
Iowa Hawkeyes football	Iowa City	69,250	2025
Iowa State Cyclones football	Ames	60,862	2025
Iowa Hawkeyes women's basketball	Iowa City	14,998	2024–25
Iowa State Cyclones men's basketball	Ames	14,062	2024–25
Iowa Hawkeyes men's wrestling	Iowa City	13,640	2024–25
Iowa State Cyclones women's basketball	Ames	9,998	2024–25
Northern Iowa Panthers football	Cedar Falls	9,371	2025
Iowa Hawkeyes men's basketball	Iowa City	9,161	2024–25

=== Professional ===
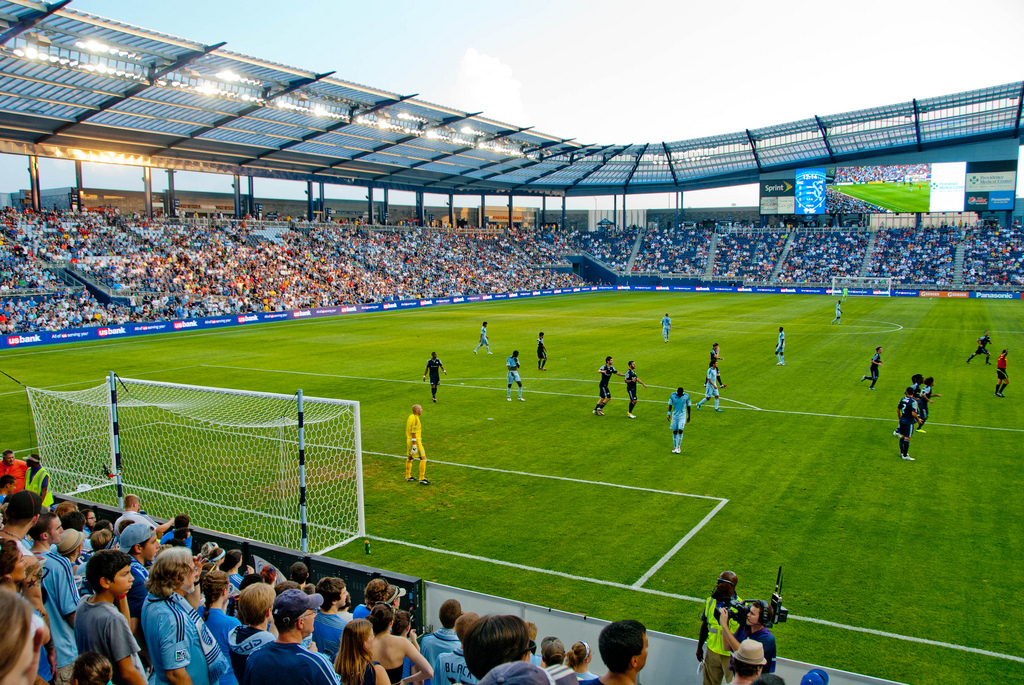
Sporting Park, Kansas City

Team	Sport	League	City
Sporting Kansas City	Soccer	Major League Soccer	Kansas City
Sporting Kansas City II	Soccer	MLS Next Pro	Kansas City
Kansas City Monarchs	Baseball	American Association	Kansas City
Garden City Wind	Baseball	Pecos League	Garden City
Kaw Valley FC	Soccer	USL League Two	Lawrence, and Topeka
Salina Liberty	Indoor football	Champions Indoor Football	Salina
Southwest Kansas Storm	Indoor football	Champions Indoor Football	Dodge City
Wichita Thunder	Ice hockey	ECHL	Wichita
Wichita Turbo Tubs	Baseball	Texas League	Wichita
Wichita Wings	Indoor Soccer	MASL 2	Wichita

Sporting Kansas City, who have played their home games at Village West in Kansas City since 2008, are the second top-tier professional sports league (after the original Wichita Wings of the MISL) and first Major League Soccer team to be located within Kansas. In 2011 the team moved to their new home, a $165 million soccer specific stadium now known as Sporting Park.

Historically, Kansans have supported the major league sports teams of Kansas City, Missouri, including the Kansas City Royals (MLB), and the Kansas City Chiefs (NFL), in part because the home stadiums for these teams are a few miles from the Kansas border. The Chiefs and the Royals play at the Truman Sports Complex, located about 10 miles (16 km) from the Kansas–Missouri state line. FC Kansas City, a charter member of the National Women's Soccer League, played the 2013 season, the first for both the team and the league, on the Kansas side of the metropolitan area, but played on the Missouri side until folding after the 2017 season. From 1973 to 1997 the flagship radio station for the Royals was WIBW in Topeka.

Some Kansans, mostly from the westernmost parts of the state, support the professional sports teams of Denver, particularly the Denver Broncos of the NFL.

Two major auto racing facilities are located in Kansas. The Kansas Speedway located in Kansas City hosts races of the NASCAR, IndyCar, and ARCA circuits. Also, the National Hot Rod Association (NHRA) holds drag racing events at Heartland Park Topeka. The Sports Car Club of America has its national headquarters in Topeka.

==== History ====
The history of professional sports in Kansas probably dates from the establishment of the minor league baseball Topeka Capitals and Leavenworth Soldiers in 1886 in the Western League. The African-American Bud Fowler played on the Topeka team that season, one year before the "color line" descended on professional baseball.

In 1887, the Western League was dominated by a reorganized Topeka team called the Golden Giants: a high-priced collection of major leaguer players, including Bug Holliday, Jim Conway, Dan Stearns, Perry Werden and Jimmy Macullar, which won the league by 15.5 games. On April 10, 1887, the Golden Giants also won an exhibition game from the defending World Series champions, the St. Louis Browns (the present-day Cardinals), by a score of 12–9. However, Topeka was unable to support the team, and it disbanded after one year.

The first night game in the history of professional baseball was played in Independence on April 28, 1930, when the Muscogee (Oklahoma) Indians beat the Independence Producers 13–3 in a minor league game sanctioned by the Western League of the Western Baseball Association with 1,500 fans attending the game. The permanent lighting system was first used for an exhibition game on April 17, 1930, between the Independence Producers and House of David semi-professional baseball team of Benton Harbor, Michigan with the Independence team winning 9–1 before a crowd of 1,700 spectators.

=== College ===
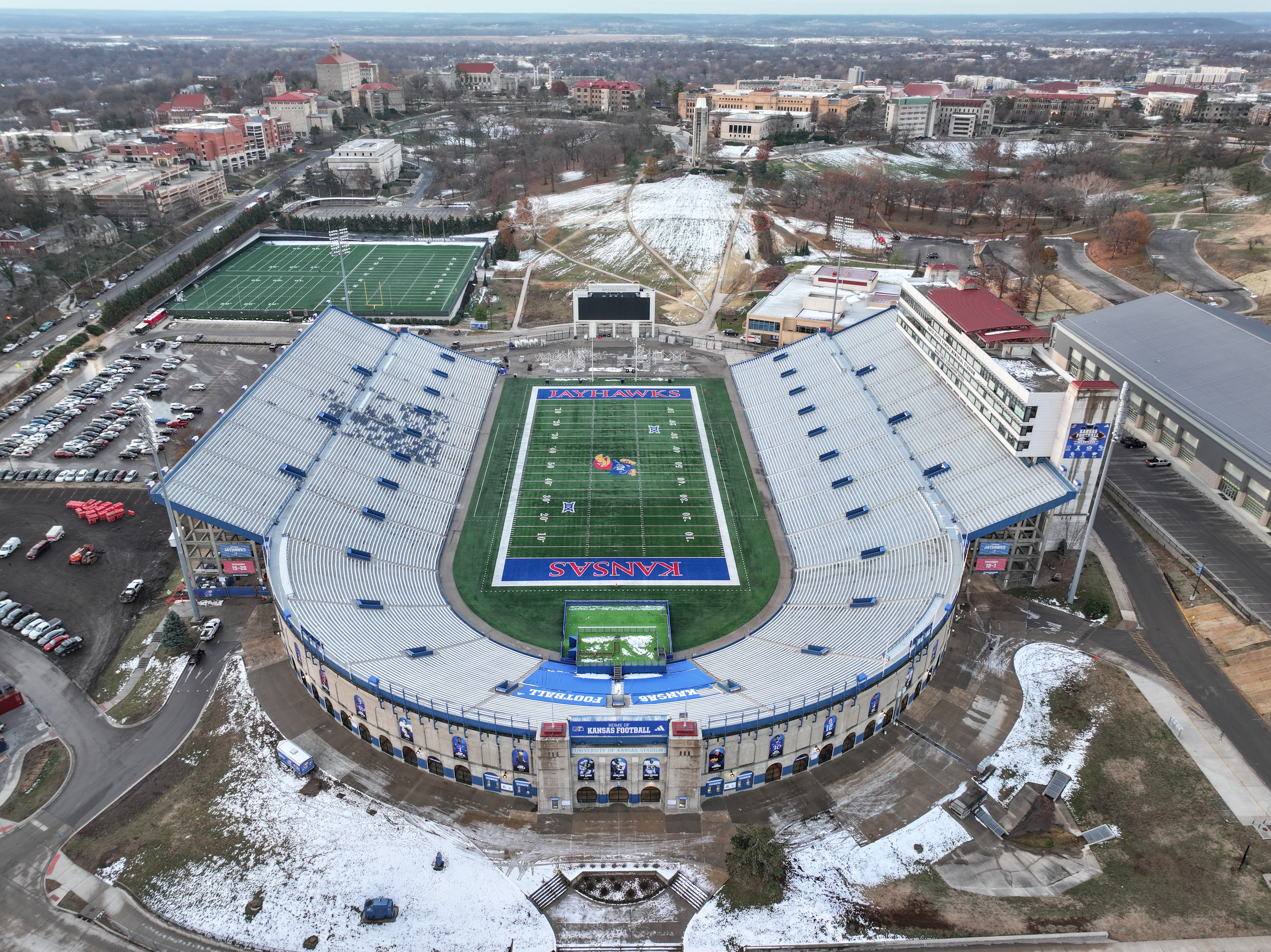
David Booth Kansas Memorial Stadium is the oldest football stadium west of the Mississippi River, and one of the oldest standing football stadiums in the country. Built in 1921, it is home to the Kansas Jayhawks football team.

The history of intercollegiate of athletics in the state dates back to 1866, with the establishment of the University of Kansas baseball team, which competed against local area teams and schools in the Kansas State Fair. The Jayhawks baseball team is one of the oldest intercollegiate baseball programs in the United States.

The governing body for intercollegiate sports in the United States, the National Collegiate Athletic Association (NCAA), was headquartered in Johnson County, Kansas from 1952 until moving to Indianapolis in 1999.

==== NCAA Division I schools ====
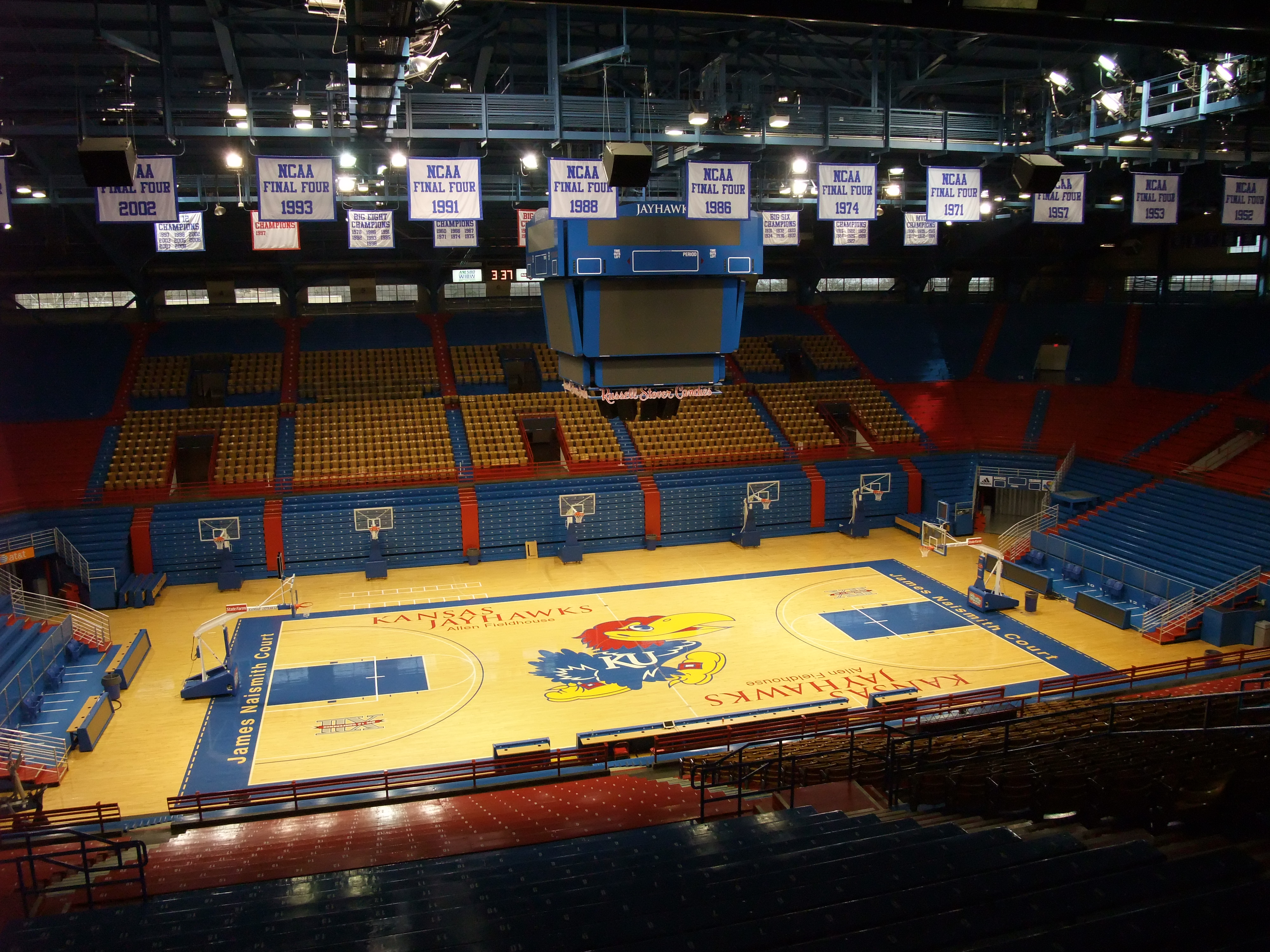
Allen Fieldhouse at University of Kansas in Lawrence

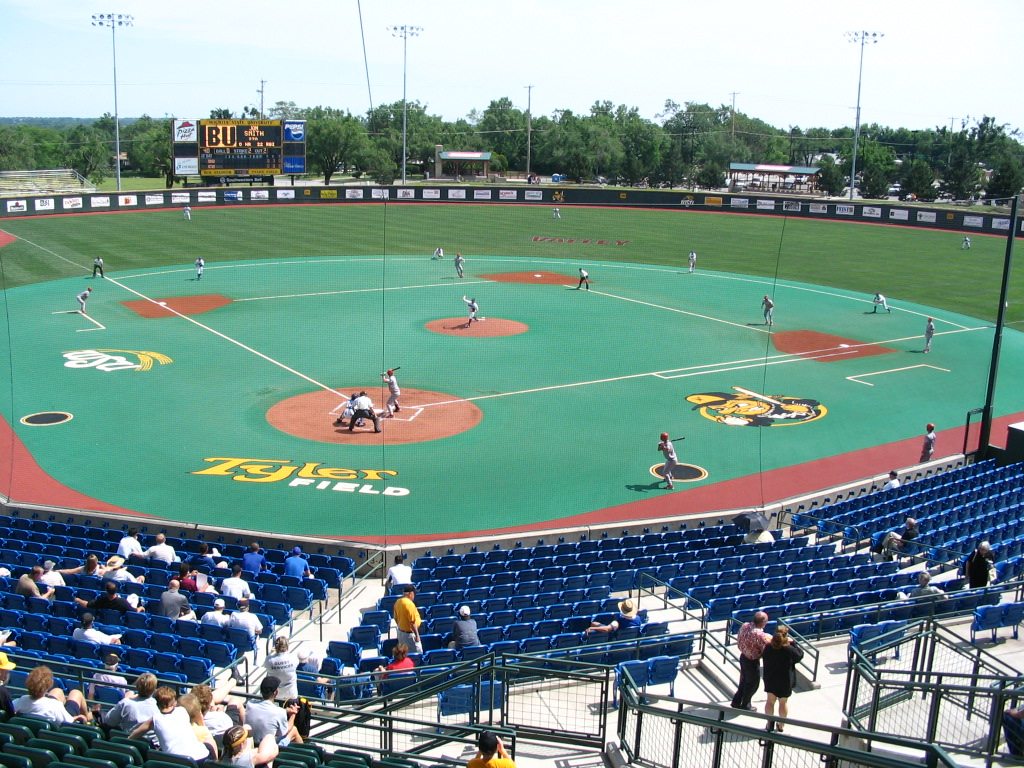
Tyler Field in Eck Stadium at Wichita State University in Wichita

While there are no franchises of the four major professional sports within the state, many Kansans are fans of the state's major college sports teams, especially the Jayhawks of the University of Kansas (KU), and the Wildcats of Kansas State University (KSU or "K-State"). The teams are rivals in the Big 12 Conference.

Both KU and K-State have tradition-rich programs in men's basketball. The Jayhawks are a perennial national power, ranking first in all-time victories among NCAA programs. The Jayhawks have won six national titles, including NCAA tournament championships in 1952, 1988, 2008, and 2022. They also were retroactively awarded national championships by the Helms Foundation for 1922 and 1923. K-State also had a long stretch of success on the hardwood, lasting from the 1940s to the 1980s, making four Final Fours during that stretch. In 1988, KU and K-State met in the Elite Eight, KU taking the game 71–58. After a 12-year absence, the Wildcats returned to the NCAA tournament in 2008, and advanced to the Elite Eight in 2010 and 2018. KU is fifth all-time with 15 Final Four appearances, while K-State's four appearances are tied for 17th.

Conversely, success on the gridiron has been less frequent for both KSU and KU. However, there have been recent breakthroughs for both schools' football teams. The Jayhawks won the Orange Bowl for the first time in three tries in 2008, capping a 12–1 season, the best in school history. And when Bill Snyder arrived to coach at K-State in 1989, he turned the Wildcats from one of the worst college football programs in America, into a national force for most of the 1990s and early 2000s. The team won the Fiesta Bowl in 1997, achieved an undefeated (11–0) regular season and No. 1 ranking in 1998, and took the Big 12 Conference championship in 2003. After three seasons in which K-State football languished, Snyder came out of retirement in 2009 and guided them to the top of the college football ranks again, finishing second in the Big 12 in 2011 and earning a berth in the Cotton Bowl, and winning the Big 12 again in 2012.

Wichita State University, which also fields teams (called the Shockers) in Division I of the NCAA, is best known for its baseball and basketball programs. In baseball, the Shockers won the College World Series in 1989. In men's basketball, they appeared in the Final Four in 1965 and 2013, and entered the 2014 NCAA tournament unbeaten. The school also fielded a football team from 1897 to 1986. The Shocker football team is tragically known for a plane crash in 1970 that killed 31 people, including 14 players.

==== NCAA Division II schools ====
Notable success has also been achieved by the state's smaller schools in football. Pittsburg State University, an NCAA Division II participant, has claimed four national titles in football, two in the NAIA and most recently the 2011 NCAA Division II national title. Pittsburg State became the winningest NCAA Division II football program in 1995. PSU passed Hillsdale College at the top of the all-time victories list in the 1995 season on its march to the national runner-up finish. The Gorillas, in 96 seasons of intercollegiate competition, have accumulated 579 victories, posting a 579–301–48 overall mark.

Washburn University, in Topeka, won the NAIA Men's Basketball Championship in 1987. The Fort Hays State University men won the 1996 NCAA Division II title with a 34–0 record, and the Washburn women won the 2005 NCAA Division II crown. St. Benedict's College (now Benedictine College), in Atchison, won the 1954 and 1967 Men's NAIA Basketball Championships.

The Kansas Collegiate Athletic Conference has its roots as one of the oldest college sport conferences in existence and participates in the NAIA and all ten member schools are in the state of Kansas. Other smaller school conferences that have some members in Kansas are the Mid-America Intercollegiate Athletics Association the Midlands Collegiate Athletic Conference, the Midwest Christian College Conference, and the Heart of America Athletic Conference. Many junior colleges also have active athletic programs.

Emporia State's women's basketball team, under head coach Brandon Schneider, who is now serving as the women's basketball coach at the University of Kansas, has seen success as well. In 2010 the team won the NCAA Division II National Championship. Emporia State and Washburn in Topeka share a heated rivalry in all sports, mostly due to the close proximity of both cities.

==== Junior colleges ====
The Kansas Jayhawk Community College Conference has been heralded as one of the best conferences in all of NJCAA football, with Garden City Community College, Independence Community College, and Butler Community College all consistently in contention for national championships.

=== High school ===
The Kansas State High School Activities Association (KSHSAA) is the organization which oversees interscholastic competition in the state of Kansas at the high school level. It oversees both athletic and non-athletic competition, and sponsors championships in several sports and activities.

=== Rivalry with Missouri ===
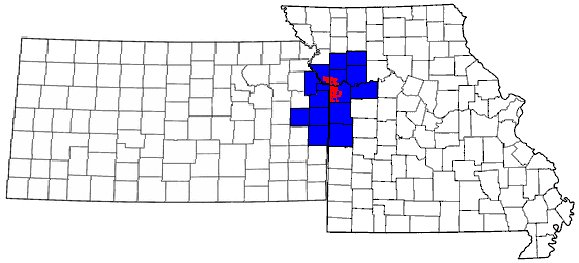
Map of Kansas and Missouri with Kansas City metro counties

Kansas and Missouri are two bordering U.S. states with a long and tumultuous history. The relationship between these two states has its roots in Bleeding Kansas, but mutual distrust has continued off and on since then, even in sporting contexts. These states also share the Kansas City metropolitan area, where both states each have a city named Kansas City on either side of the Missouri River. The bitterness sown during Bleeding Kansas lingers in the Border War between the University of Kansas and the University of Missouri. The two states compete economically, mainly at the border which is also called a Border War. In 2019, the governors of the two states signed an agreement to stop offering financial incentives to pull business across the border. In 2022, the governor of Kansas said that agreement did not include enticement of the Chiefs football team moving its arena from Missouri to Kansas. In 2024, the Kansas House of Representatives and Kansas State Senate passed legislation that would give professional sports programs north of $1 billion in STAR bonds for the development of stadiums and entertainment districts in Kansas City, Kansas. The Chiefs and Royals both hired lobbyists in 2024 that appealed to the Kansas Legislature. As of March 2025, the Chiefs haven't commented directly on a move to Kansas, but the Royals have expressed interest in building a riverfront stadium on the junction between the Kansas River and Missouri River. Kansas House of Representatives member Sean Tarwater said that talks with the Chiefs were intensifying in February 2025, and that Kansas was close to "bringing over at least one team, maybe two". In June 2024, an architecture firm in Kansas released a video featuring 3D renderings of a potential design for a domed stadium in Kansas City, Kansas.

=== Michigan ===
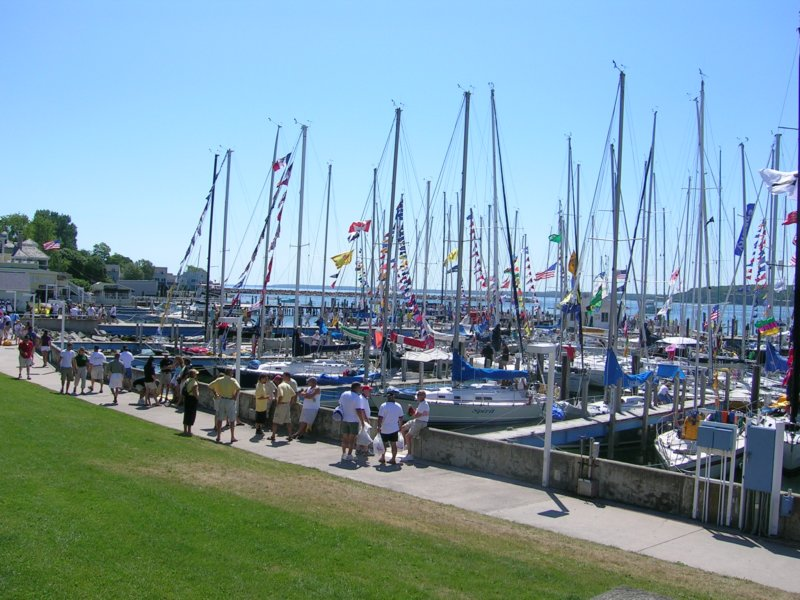
Mackinac Island Marina after the 2006 Port Huron to Mackinac Boat Race

Michigan's major-league sports teams include: Detroit Tigers baseball team, Detroit Lions football team, Detroit Red Wings ice hockey team, and the Detroit Pistons men's basketball team. All of Michigan's major league teams play in the Metro Detroit area. The state also has a professional second-tier (USL Championship) soccer team in Detroit City FC, which plays its home games at Keyworth Stadium in Hamtramck, Michigan.

The Pistons played at Detroit's Cobo Arena until 1978 and at the Pontiac Silverdome until 1988 when they moved into The Palace of Auburn Hills. In 2017, the team moved to the newly built Little Caesars Arena in downtown Detroit. The Detroit Lions played at Tiger Stadium in Detroit until 1974, then moved to the Pontiac Silverdome where they played for 27 years between 1975 and 2002 before moving to Ford Field in Detroit in 2002. The Detroit Tigers played at Tiger Stadium (formerly known as Navin Field and Briggs Stadium) from 1912 to 1999. In 2000, they moved to Comerica Park. The Red Wings played at Olympia Stadium before moving to Joe Louis Arena in 1979. They later moved to Little Caesars Arena to join the Pistons as tenants in 2017. Professional hockey got its start in 1903 in Houghton, Michigan, when the Portage Lakers were formed.

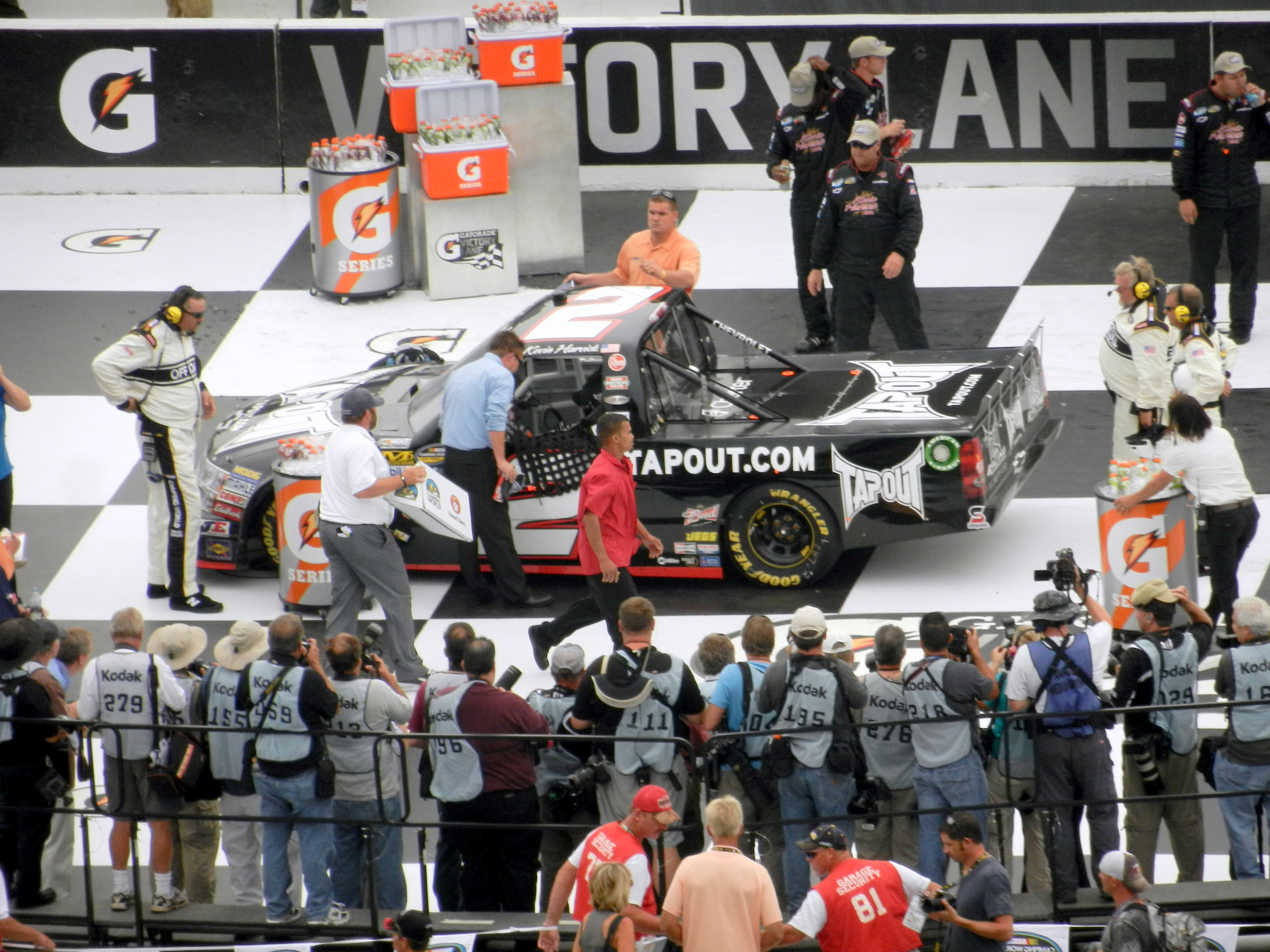
The 2011 NASCAR Camping World Truck Series at Michigan International Speedway in Brooklyn, Michigan

The Michigan International Speedway is the site of NASCAR races and Detroit was formerly the site of a Formula One World Championship Grand Prix race. From 1959 to 1961, Detroit Dragway hosted the NHRA's U.S. Nationals. Michigan is home to one of the major canoeing marathons: the 120-mile (190 km) Au Sable River Canoe Marathon. The Port Huron to Mackinac Boat Race is also a favorite.

Twenty-time Grand Slam champion Serena Williams was born in Saginaw. The 2011 World Champion for Women's Artistic Gymnastics, Jordyn Wieber is from DeWitt. Wieber was also a member of the gold medal team at the London Olympics in 2012.

Collegiate sports in Michigan are popular in addition to professional sports. The state's two largest athletic programs are the Michigan Wolverines and Michigan State Spartans. They compete in the NCAA Big Ten Conference for most sports. The Michigan High School Athletic Association features around 300,000 participants.

Throughout the 20th century, Detroit made seven bids for the Summer Olympics, but failed to ever secure the right to host the Olympics.

=== Minnesota ===
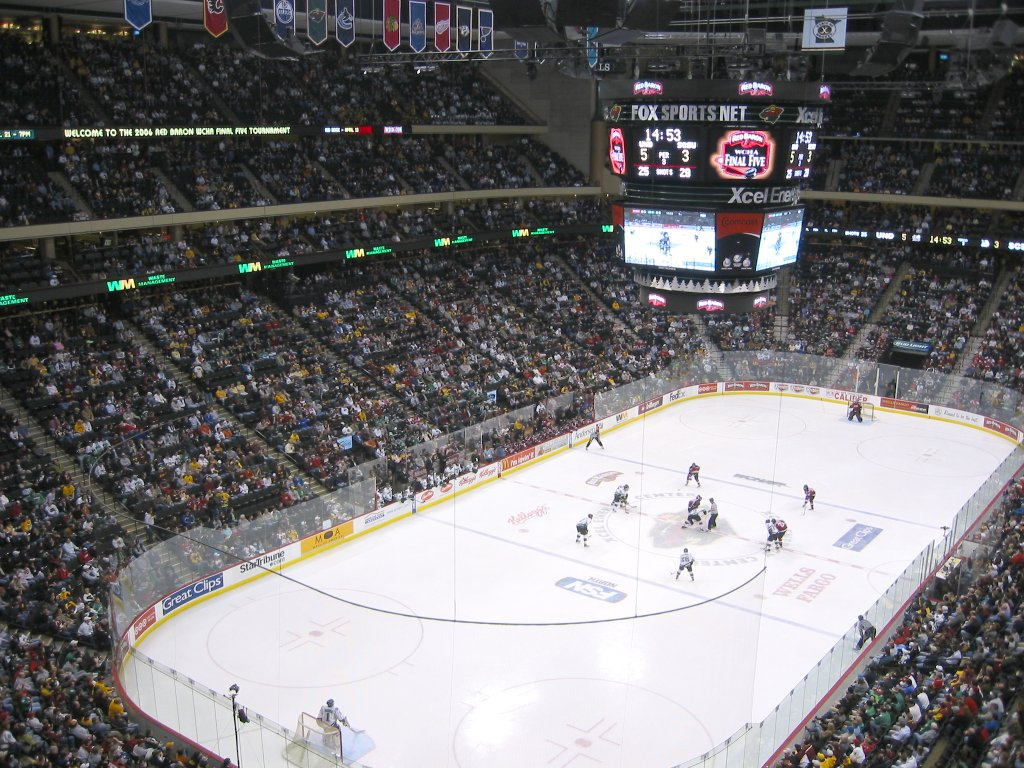
The University of North Dakota and St. Cloud State University during the WCHA Final Five at the Grand Casino Arena.

Minnesota has professional men's teams in all major sports.

The Minnesota Vikings, an American football team based in Minneapolis, have played in the National Football League since their admission as an expansion franchise in 1961. They played in Metropolitan Stadium from 1961 through 1981 and in the Hubert H. Humphrey Metrodome from 1982 until its demolition after the 2013 season for the construction of the team's new and current home, U.S. Bank Stadium. This stadium hosted Super Bowl LII in February 2018. Super Bowl XXVI was played in the Metrodome in 1992. The Vikings have advanced to the Super Bowl Super Bowl IV, Super Bowl VIII, Super Bowl IX, and Super Bowl XI, losing all four games to their AFC/AFL opponent.

The Minnesota Twins have played in the Major League Baseball in the Twin Cities since 1961. The Twins began play as the original Washington Senators, a founding member of the American League in 1901, relocating to Minnesota in 1961. The Twins won the 1987 and 1991 World Series in seven-game matches where the home team was victorious in all games. The Twins also advanced to the 1965 World Series, where they lost to the Los Angeles Dodgers in seven games. The team has played at Target Field since 2010.

The Minneapolis Lakers of the National Basketball Association played in the Minneapolis Auditorium from 1947 to 1960, after which they relocated to Los Angeles. The Minnesota Timberwolves joined the NBA in 1989, and have played in Target Center since 1990.

The National Hockey League's Minnesota Wild play in St. Paul's Grand Casino Arena, and reached 300 consecutive sold-out games on January 16, 2008. Previously, the Minnesota North Stars competed in the NHL from 1967 to 1993, which played in and lost the 1981 and 1991 Stanley Cup Finals.

Minnesota United FC joined Major League Soccer as an expansion team in 2017, having played in the lower-division North American Soccer League from 2010 to 2016. The team plays at Allianz Field in St. Paul. Previous professional soccer teams have included the Minnesota Kicks, which played at Metropolitan Stadium from 1976 to 1981, and the Minnesota Strikers from 1984 to 1988.

Minnesota also has minor-league professional sports teams. The Minnesota Swarm of the National Lacrosse League played at the Xcel Energy Center until the team moved to Georgia in 2015. The St. Paul Saints, who play at CHS Field in St. Paul, are the Triple-A minor league affiliate of the Minnesota Twins.

Professional women's sports include the Minnesota Lynx of the Women's National Basketball Association, winners of the 2011, 2013, 2015, and 2017 WNBA Championships, Minnesota Aurora FC of the United Soccer League W-League, the Minnesota Vixen of the Independent Women's Football League, the Minnesota Valkyrie of the Legends Football League, the Minnesota Frost of the Professional Women's Hockey League, and the Minnesota Whitecaps of the National Women's Hockey League.

The Twin Cities campus of the University of Minnesota is a National Collegiate Athletic Association (NCAA) Division I school competing in the Big Ten Conference. Four additional schools in the state compete in NCAA Division I ice hockey: the University of Minnesota Duluth; Minnesota State University, Mankato; St. Cloud State University and Bemidji State University. There are nine NCAA Division II colleges in the Northern Sun Intercollegiate Conference, and twenty NCAA Division III colleges in the Minnesota Intercollegiate Athletic Conference and Upper Midwest Athletic Conference.

Minneapolis has hosted the NCAA Men's Division I Basketball Championship in 1951, 1992, 2001, and 2019.

The Hazeltine National Golf Club has hosted the U.S. Open, U.S. Women's Open, U.S. Senior Open and PGA Championship. The course also hosted the Ryder Cup in the fall of 2016, when it became one of two courses in the U.S. to host all major golf competitions. The Ryder Cup is scheduled to return in 2028.

Interlachen Country Club has hosted the U.S. Open, U.S. Women's Open, and Solheim Cup.

Winter Olympic Games medalists from the state include twelve of the twenty members of the gold medal 1980 ice hockey team (coached by Minnesota native Herb Brooks) and the bronze medalist U.S. men's curling team in the 2006 Winter Olympics, as well as the gold medal-winning team from Duluth at the 2018 Winter Olympics. Swimmer Tom Malchow won an Olympic gold medal in the 2000 Summer games and a silver medal in 1996.

Grandma's Marathon is run every summer along the scenic North Shore of Lake Superior, and the Twin Cities Marathon winds around lakes and the Mississippi River during the peak of the fall color season. Farther north, Eveleth is the location of the United States Hockey Hall of Fame.

=== Missouri ===
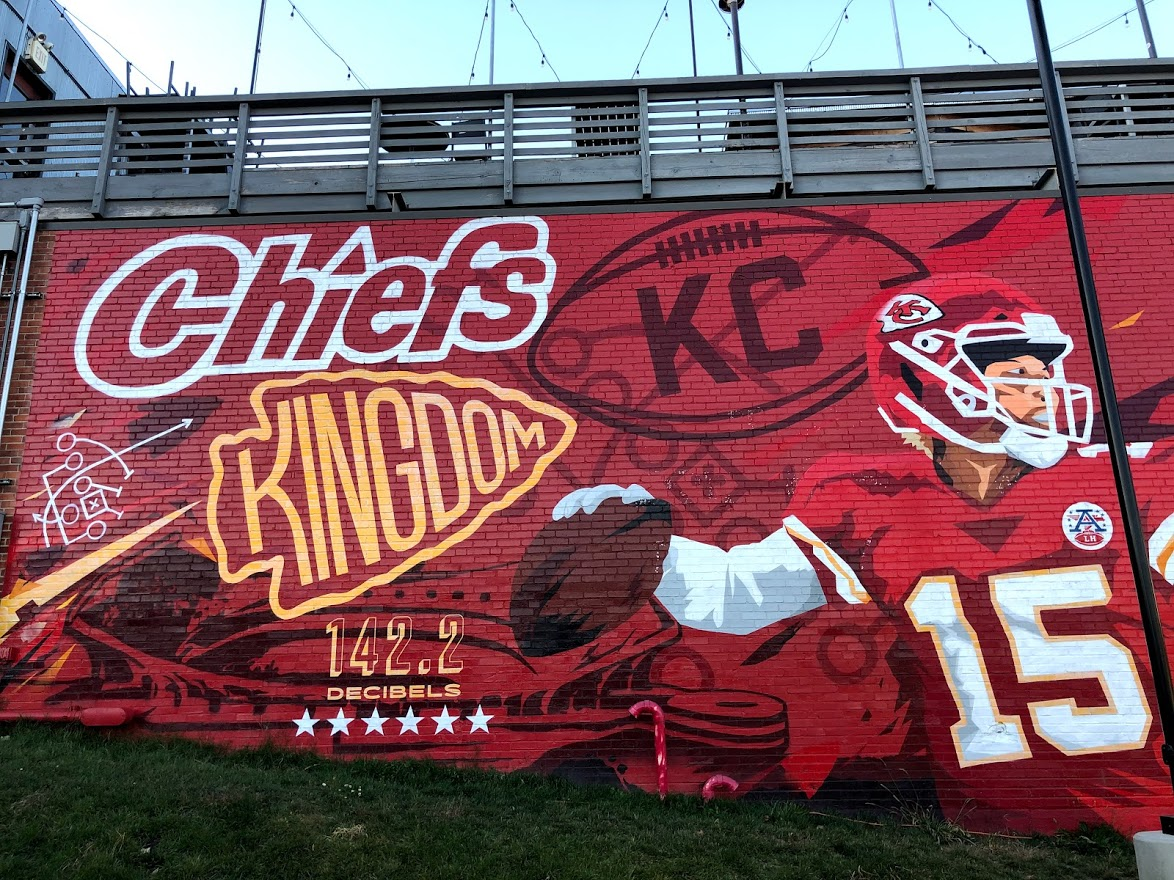
A mural honoring the Kansas City Chiefs on the wall of the Westport Alehouse in Kansas City

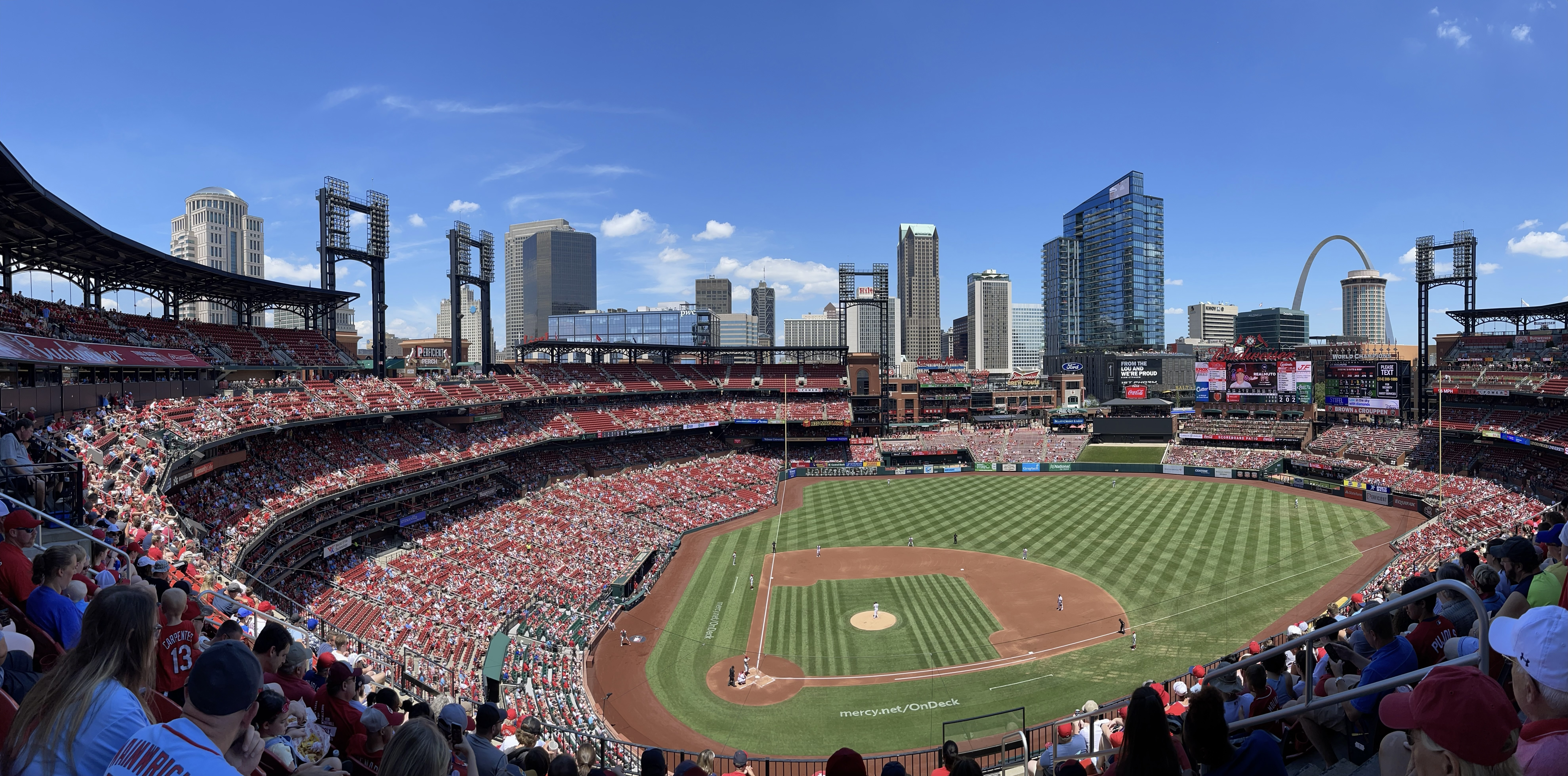
Busch Stadium, where the St. Louis Cardinals play

Missouri hosted the 1904 Summer Olympics in St. Louis, the first time the games were hosted in the United States.

Professional major league teams:

- MLB: St. Louis Cardinals, Kansas City Royals
- NFL: Kansas City Chiefs
- NHL: St. Louis Blues
- MLS: St. Louis City SC

Former professional major league teams:

- National Football League:
  - St. Louis Cardinals (moved from Chicago in 1960; moved to Tempe, Arizona, in 1988 and are now the Arizona Cardinals)
  - St. Louis All Stars (active in 1923 only)
  - Kansas City Blues/Cowboys (active 1924–1926, folded)
  - St. Louis Gunners (independent team, joined the NFL for the last three weeks of the 1934 season and folded thereafter)
  - St. Louis Rams 1995–2015 moved from Los Angeles and then back to Los Angeles
- Major League Baseball (American League):
  - St. Louis Browns (moved from Milwaukee in 1902; moved to Baltimore, Maryland after the 1953 season and are now the Baltimore Orioles)
  - Kansas City Athletics (moved from Philadelphia in 1955; moved to Oakland, California after the 1967 season and are now the Oakland Athletics)
- National Basketball Association:
  - St. Louis Bombers (charter BAA franchise in 1946, joined the NBA when it formed in 1949; ceased operations in 1950)
  - St. Louis Hawks (moved from Milwaukee in 1955; moved to Atlanta in 1968 and are now the Atlanta Hawks)
  - Kansas City Kings (moved from Cincinnati in 1972; moved to Sacramento in 1985 and are now the Sacramento Kings; prior to locating in Kansas City, they were known as the Cincinnati Royals)
- National Hockey League:
  - Kansas City Scouts (1974 expansion team, moved to Denver, Colorado in 1976 and became the Colorado Rockies, and would move again to Newark, New Jersey; now called the New Jersey Devils)
  - St. Louis Eagles (1934 relocation of the original Ottawa Senators, folded after the 1934–35 season)
- Major League Soccer:
  - Kansas City Wiz/Kansas City Wizards (founded in 1995, but moved from Kansas City, Missouri, to Kansas City, Kansas, in 2010 and became Sporting Kansas City)

=== Nebraska ===
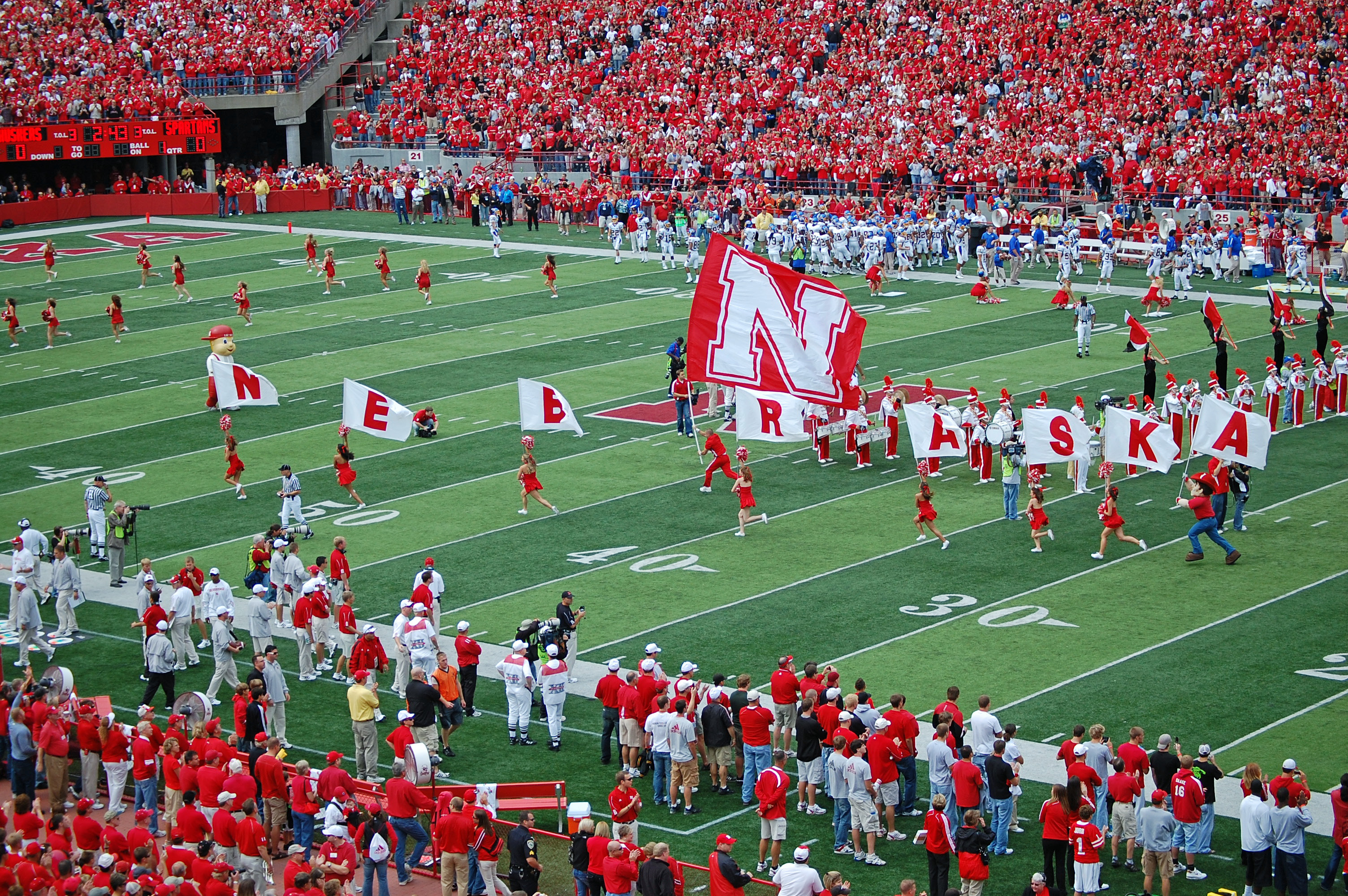
Football game at the University of Nebraska on September 6, 2008

=== North Dakota ===
Bismarck was home of the Dakota Wizards of the NBA Development League and the Bismarck Bucks of the Indoor Football League.

North Dakota has two NCAA Division I teams, the North Dakota Fighting Hawks and North Dakota State Bison, with the Bison football team being the only FBS football team in North Dakota. There are three Division II teams, the Mary Marauders, Minot State Beavers and Jamestown Jimmies.

Fargo is home to the USHL ice hockey team the Fargo Force. Fargo is also the home of the Fargo-Moorhead RedHawks of the American Association.

The North Dakota High School Activities Association features more than 25,000 participants.

Outdoor activities such as hunting and fishing are hobbies for many North Dakotans. Ice fishing, skiing, and snowmobiling are also popular during the winter months. Residents of North Dakota may own or visit a cabin along a lake. Popular sport fish include walleye, perch, and northern pike.

The western terminus of the North Country National Scenic Trail is on Lake Sakakawea, where it abuts the Lewis and Clark Trail.

=== Ohio ===
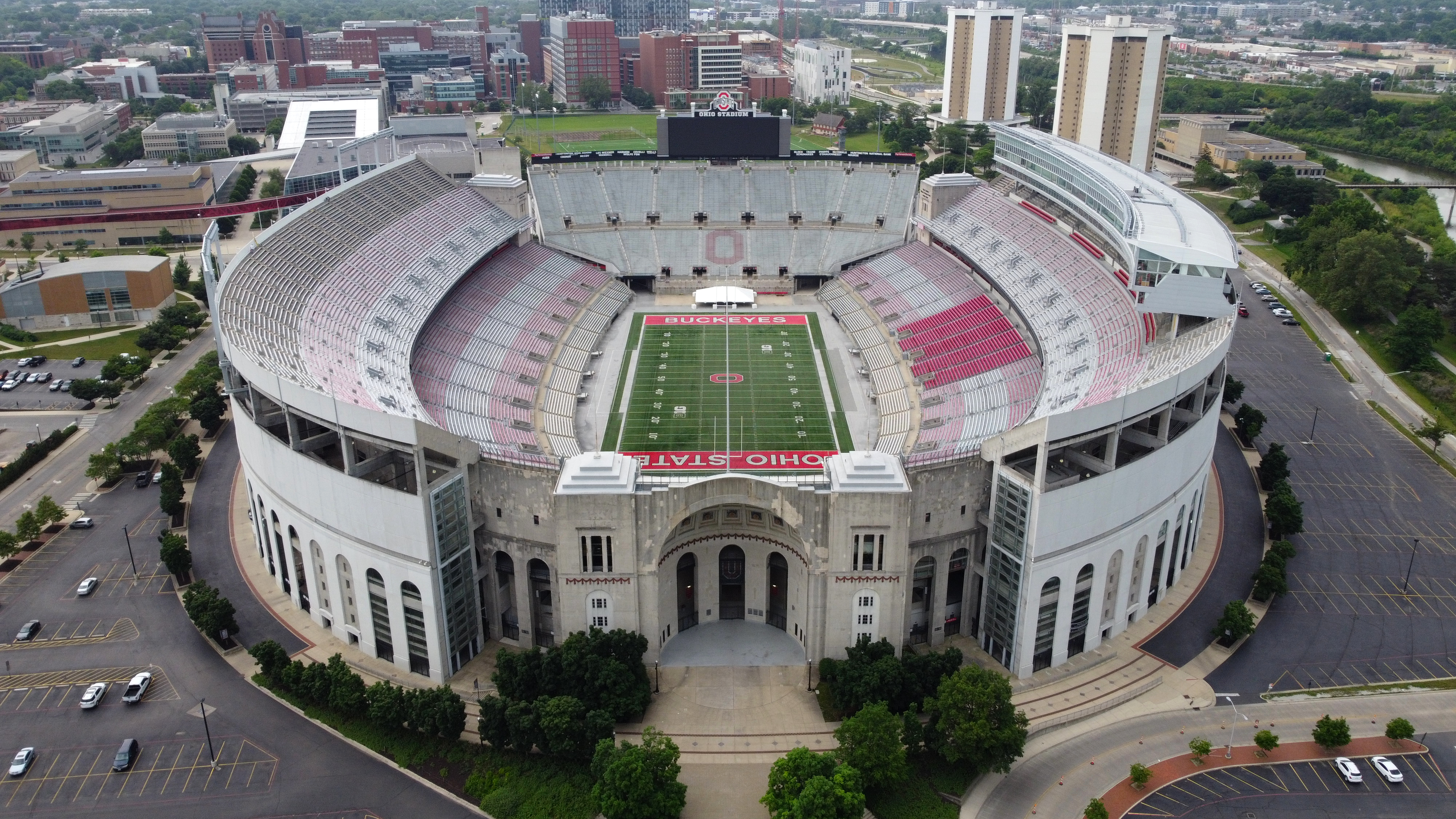
Ohio Stadium in Columbus is the fifth-largest stadium in the world.

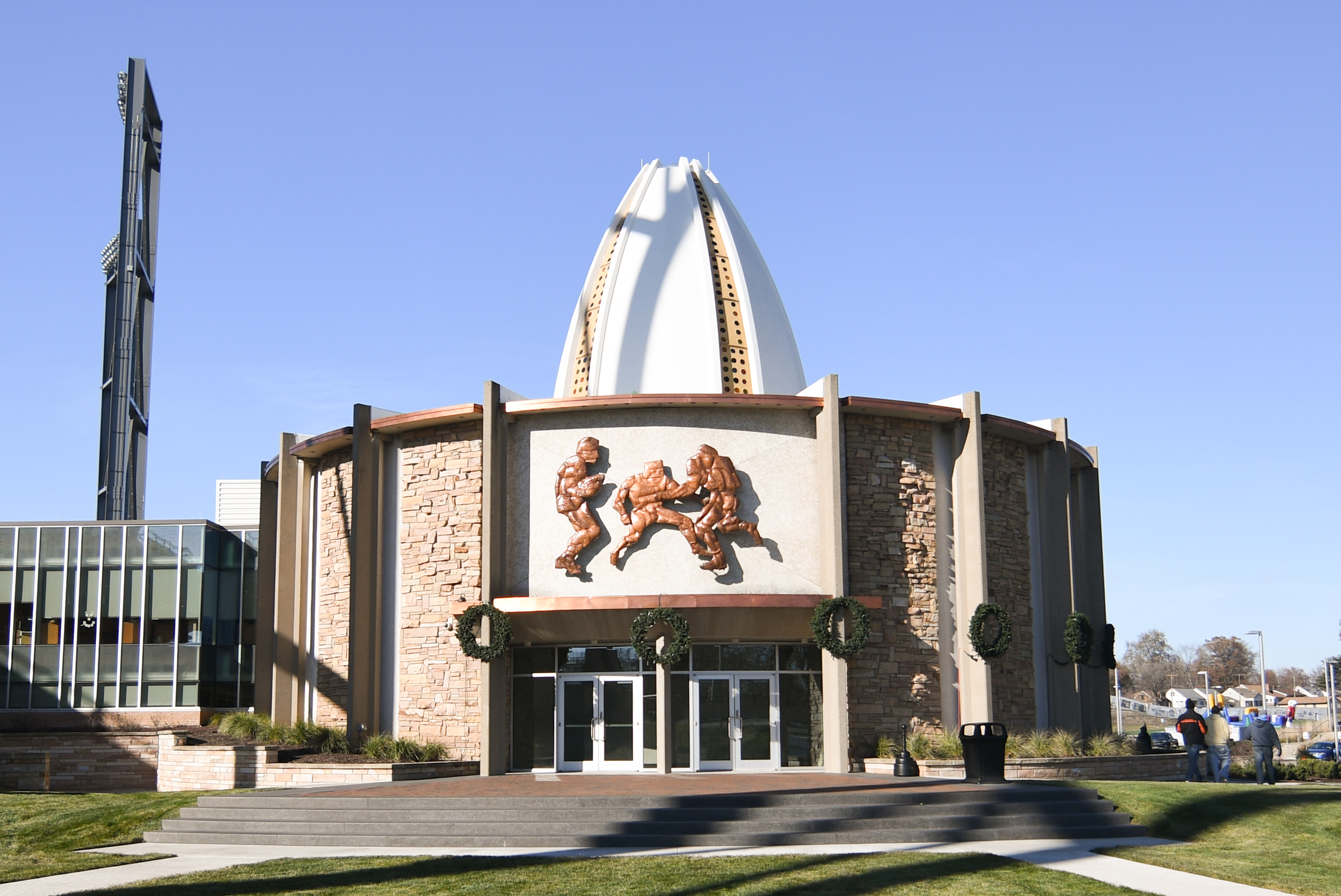
The Pro Football Hall of Fame in Canton, where the National Football League was founded in 1920.

Ohio is home to eight major professional sports teams across the five major North American leagues: the Cincinnati Reds and Cleveland Guardians in Major League Baseball, the Cincinnati Bengals and Cleveland Browns in the National Football League, the Cleveland Cavaliers in the National Basketball Association, the Columbus Blue Jackets in the National Hockey League, and the Columbus Crew and FC Cincinnati in Major League Soccer. Ohio teams have won multiple national championships, including seven World Series titles, three MLS Cups, one NBA championship, and nine NFL championships prior to the Super Bowl era. The state also hosts numerous minor league and lower-division teams. Ohio also hosts major individual sporting events, including the Memorial Tournament in golf and the Cincinnati Open in tennis, as well as prominent motorsports venues such as the Mid-Ohio Sports Car Course and Eldora Speedway.

Ohio played a central role in the development of both Major League Baseball and the National Football League. Baseball's first fully professional team, the Cincinnati Red Stockings of 1869, were organized in Ohio. An informal early-20th-century American football association, the Ohio League, was the direct predecessor of the modern NFL, although neither of Ohio's modern NFL franchises trace their roots to an Ohio League club. The NFL itself was founded in Canton, Ohio, in 1920 as the American Professional Football Conference. The first official game occurred on October 3, 1920, when the Dayton Triangles beat the Columbus Panhandles 14–0 in Dayton. Canton was enshrined as the home of the Pro Football Hall of Fame in 1963.

College athletics are also prominent in Ohio, which has eight NCAA Division I Football Bowl Subdivision programs. The Ohio State Buckeyes, competing in the Big Ten Conference, are among the most successful programs in college football history, with multiple national championships and Heisman Trophy winners. The Cincinnati Bearcats compete in the Big 12 Conference, while six teams are represented in the Mid-American Conference: the Akron Zips, Bowling Green Falcons, Kent State Golden Flashes, Miami RedHawks, Ohio Bobcats and Toledo Rockets. Other Division I institutions include the Xavier Musketeers and Youngstown State Penguins. In addition, Ohio has 12 NCAA Division II programs and 22 NCAA Division III programs.

=== South Dakota ===
Because of its low population, South Dakota does not host any major league professional sports franchises. The state has minor league and independent league teams, all of which play in Sioux Falls or Rapid City. Sioux Falls is home to four teams: the Sioux Falls Canaries (baseball), the Sioux Falls Skyforce (basketball), the Sioux Falls Stampede (hockey), and the Sioux Falls Storm (indoor American football). The Canaries play in the American Association, and their home field is Sioux Falls Stadium. The Skyforce plays in the NBA G League and is owned by the NBA's Miami Heat. It plays at the Sanford Pentagon. The Stampede and Storm share the Denny Sanford Premier Center. The Stampede plays in the USHL, and the Storm plays in the IFL. Rapid City has a hockey team named the Rapid City Rush that plays in the ECHL. The Rush began its inaugural season in 2008 at the Rushmore Plaza Civic Center.

Universities in South Dakota host a variety of sports programs. For many years, South Dakota was one of the only states in the country without an NCAA Division I football or basketball team. However, the South Dakota State Jackrabbits decided to move their teams from Division II to Division I in 2007, a move followed by the South Dakota Coyotes in 2011. Other universities in the state compete at the NCAA's Division II level, or in the NAIA.

Famous South Dakota athletes include Billy Mills, Mike Miller, Mark Ellis, Becky Hammon, Brock Lesnar, Chad Greenway, and Adam Vinatieri. Mills is from the town of Pine Ridge and competed at the 1964 Summer Olympic Games in Tokyo, becoming the only American to win a gold medal in the 10,000-meter event. Miller, of Mitchell, is a two-time NBA champion who played college basketball at the University of Florida, leading them to the 2000 NCAA Championship game his sophomore year, and won the 2001 NBA rookie of the year award. Ellis, of Rapid City, played for the University of Florida and four MLB teams before retiring in 2015. Hammon, of Rapid City, played for the WNBA's New York Liberty and San Antonio Silver Stars before becoming an assistant coach for the NBA's San Antonio Spurs in 2014. Lesnar, of Webster, is a former heavy-weight champion in the UFC and WWE. Vinatieri is an NFL placekicker who grew up in Rapid City and attended SDSU.

=== Wisconsin ===
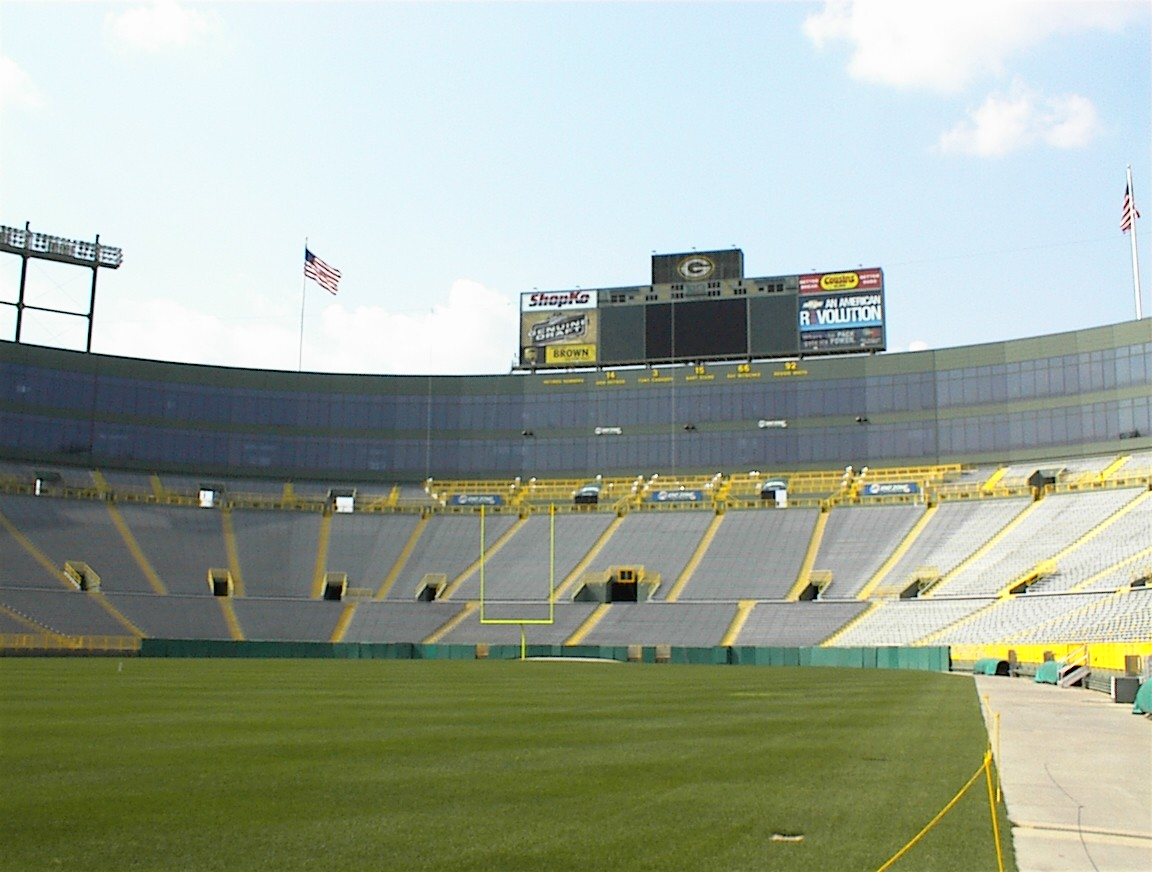
Lambeau Field is home to the publicly owned Green Bay Packers of the National Football League.

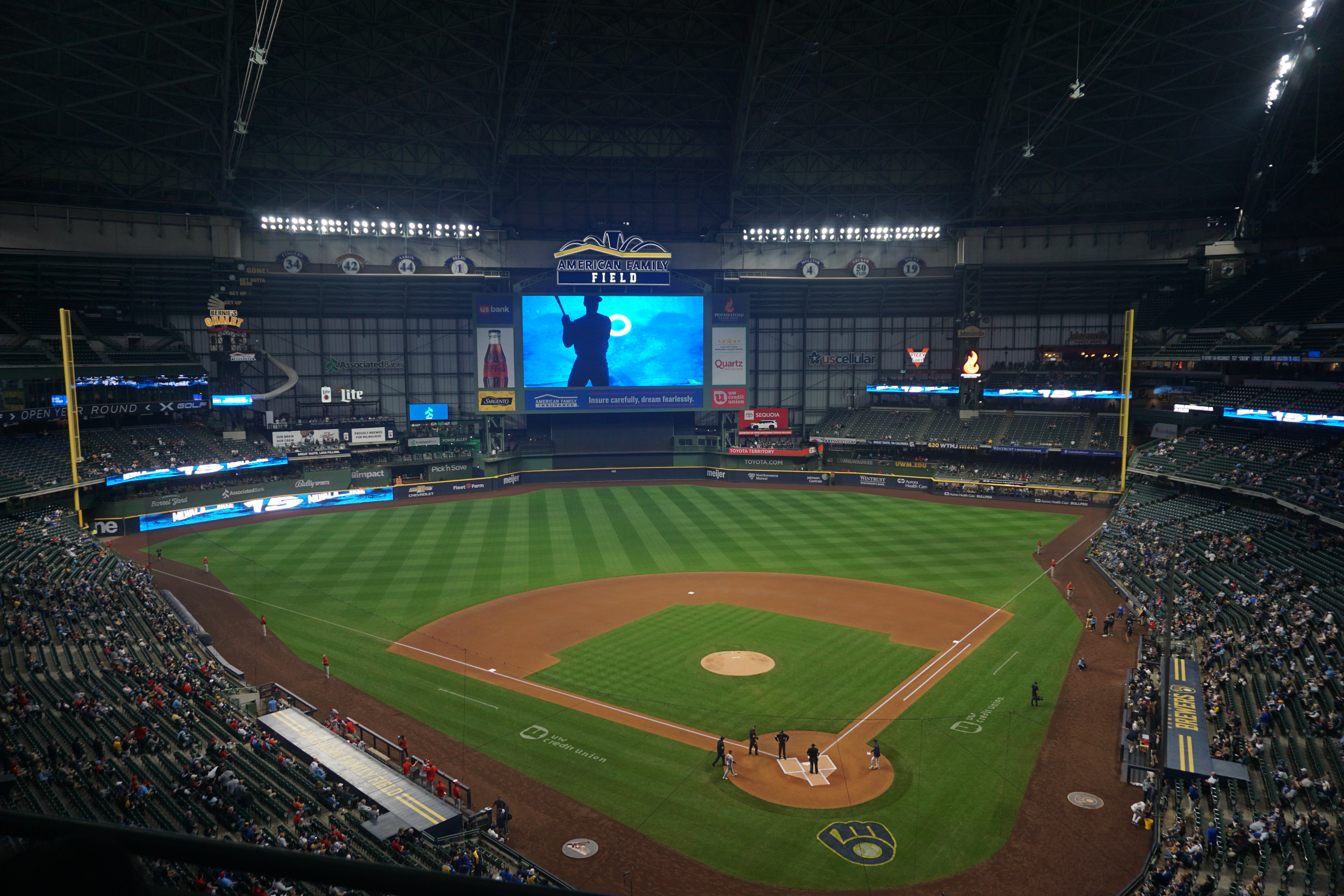
American Family Field is home to the Milwaukee Brewers, one of two professional sports teams based in Milwaukee.

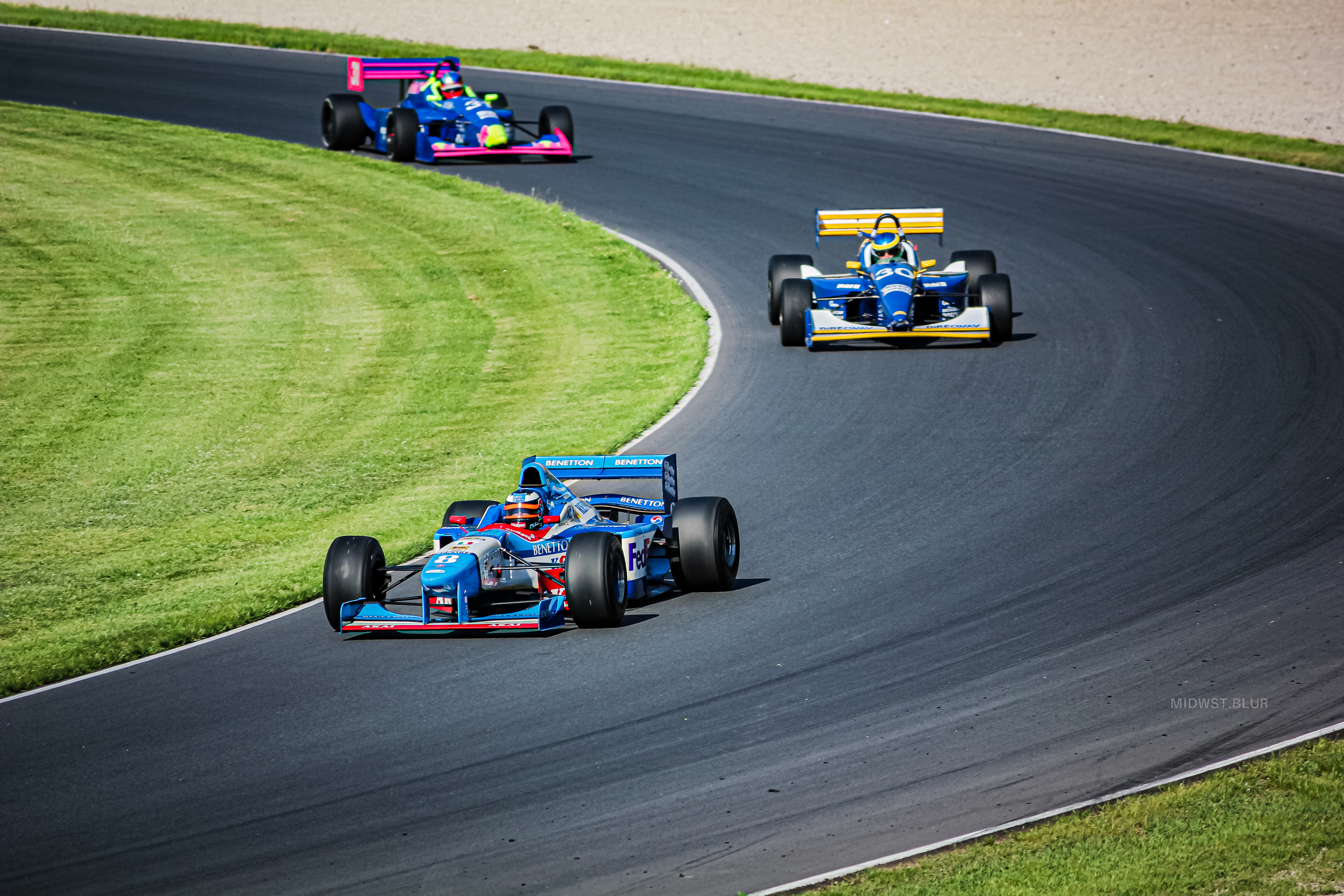
Road America, near Elkhart Lake, has hosted motorsport races since the 1950s.

Wisconsin is represented by major league teams in three sports: football, baseball, and basketball. Lambeau Field, located in Green Bay, Wisconsin, is home to the National Football League's Green Bay Packers. The Packers have been part of the NFL since the league's second season in 1921 and are the smallest city franchise in the NFL, and the only one owned by shareholders statewide. The Milwaukee Brewers, the state's only major league baseball team, have played in American Family Field in Milwaukee since 2001. Before the Brewers, Milwaukee had two prior Major League teams. The first team, also called the Brewers, played only one season in 1901 before becoming the St. Louis Browns. Milwaukee was also the home of the now-Atlanta Braves franchise when they moved from Boston from 1953 to 1965, winning the World Series in 1957. The Milwaukee Bucks of the National Basketball Association play home games at the Fiserv Forum.

The state also has minor league teams in hockey (Milwaukee Admirals) and baseball (the Wisconsin Timber Rattlers, based in Appleton and the Beloit Sky Carp of the High-A minor leagues). In addition to these affiliated minor league teams, Wisconsin has two American Association of Professional Baseball teams, being the Milwaukee Milkmen based in Franklin, and the Lake Country DockHounds based in Oconomowoc. Wisconsin is also home to nine Northwoods League teams. The Madison Mallards, the La Crosse Loggers, the Lakeshore Chinooks, the Eau Claire Express, the Fond du Lac Dock Spiders, the Green Bay Rockers, the Kenosha Kingfish, the Wausau Woodchucks, and the Wisconsin Rapids Rafters all play in a collegiate all-star summer league. In addition to the Packers, Green Bay is also the home to an indoor football team, the Green Bay Blizzard of the IFL. The state is home to the seven-time MISL/MASL Champion Milwaukee Wave. Wisconsin is also home to Forward Madison FC, which is a professional soccer team that plays in the USL League One. The Northern Elite Football League consists of many amateur semi-pro teams from Wisconsin.

Wisconsin also has many college sports programs, including the NCAA Division I Wisconsin Badgers, Milwaukee Panthers, and Green Bay Phoenix. The Marquette Golden Eagles of the Big East Conference, the state's other major collegiate program, is known for its men's basketball team. Many other schools in the University of Wisconsin system compete in the Wisconsin Intercollegiate Athletic Conference at the Division III level. The conference is one of the most successful in the nation, claiming 107 NCAA national championships in 15 different sports as of March 30, 2015.

The Milwaukee Mile, an oval track opened in 1903, is the oldest operating motorsports venue in the world, having hosted the IndyCar Series and NASCAR. Road America near Elkhart Lake hosts races in the IndyCar Series, IMSA SportsCar Championship, Sports Car Club of America GT World Challenge America and Trans-Am Series and the MotoAmerica Superbike Championship. Dirt tracks are also popular, with the World of Outlaws and High Limit Racing both going to different tracks.

The World Championship Snowmobile Derby is held at Eagle River, Wisconsin. The world championship off-road racing event is held at Crandon International Off-Road Raceway.

Wisconsin is home to the nation's oldest operating velodrome in Kenosha where races have been held every year since 1927.

Sheboygan is home to Whistling Straits golf club which has hosted PGA Championships in 2004, 2010 and 2015 and the Ryder Cup golf competition between USA and Europe in 2020. The Greater Milwaukee Open, later named the U.S. Bank Championship in Milwaukee, was a PGA Tour tournament from 1968 to 2009 held annually in Brown Deer. In 2017, Erin Hills, a golf course in Erin, Wisconsin, approximately 30 miles northwest of Milwaukee, hosted the U.S. Open.

== South ==
=== Football ===
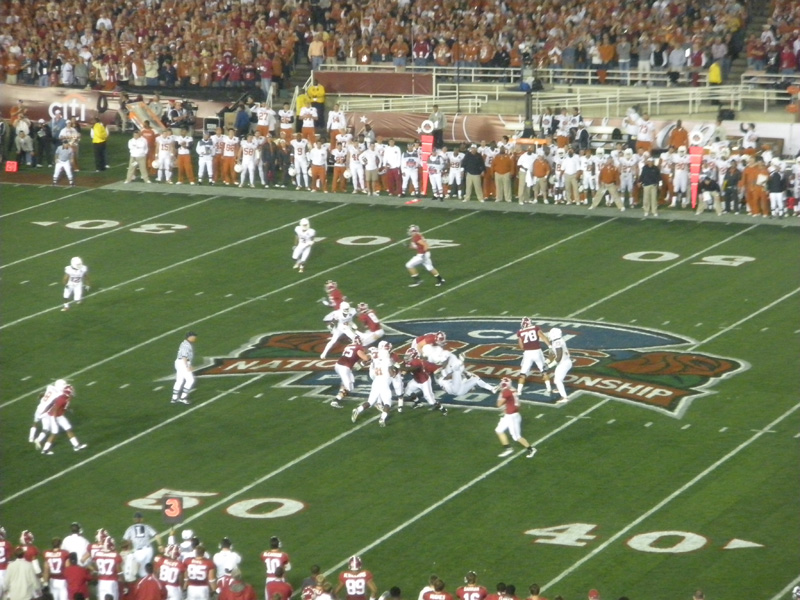
Alabama plays Texas for the 2010 BCS National Championship.

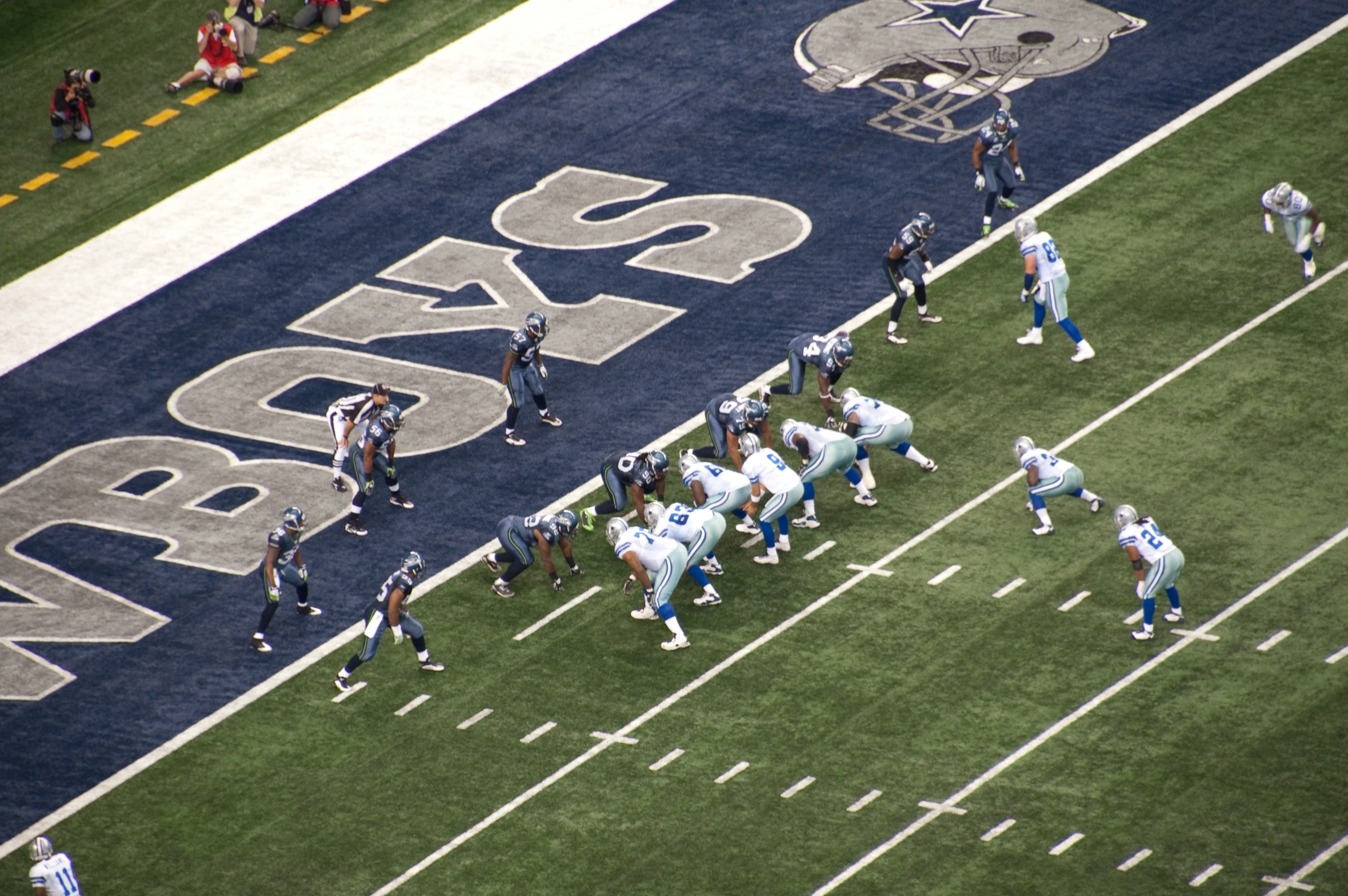
The Dallas Cowboys are one of the region's most popular NFL teams.

American football is heavily considered the most popular team sport in most areas of the Southern United States.

The region is home to numerous decorated and historic college football programs, particularly in the Southeastern Conference (known as the "SEC"), Atlantic Coast Conference (known as the "ACC"), and the Big 12 Conference. The SEC, consisting almost entirely of teams based in Southern states, is widely considered to be the strongest league in contemporary college football and includes the Alabama Crimson Tide, the program with the most national championships in the sport's modern history. The sport is also highly competitive and has a spectator following at the high school level, particularly in rural areas, where high school football games often serve as prominent community gatherings.

The first established professional football team based in the South were the Washington Redskins, now called the Washington Commanders. They still retain a large following in most of Virginia and parts of Maryland. Later on, the National Football League (NFL) and American Football League (AFL) began to expand many teams in the Southern US during the 1960s, with franchises like the Atlanta Falcons, New Orleans Saints, Houston Oilers, Miami Dolphins, and the Dallas Cowboys. In later decades, NFL expansion into Southern states continued, with the Tampa Bay Buccaneers during the 1970s, along with the Carolina Panthers, Jacksonville Jaguars, and Baltimore Ravens during the 1990s. The Houston Oilers were eventually replaced by the Houston Texans, after the Oilers relocated to Nashville to become the Tennessee Titans.

Collegiate football teams
Rank	Team	League	Attendance (2019 avg/game)
1	Texas A&M Aggies	NCAA (SEC)	101,608
2	Alabama Crimson Tide	NCAA (SEC)	101,117
3	LSU Tigers	NCAA (SEC)	100,842
4	Texas Longhorns	NCAA (SEC)	96,306
5	Georgia Bulldogs	NCAA (SEC)	92,817
6	Tennessee Volunteers	NCAA (SEC)	87,864
7	Oklahoma Sooners	NCAA (SEC)	86,735
8	Auburn Tigers	NCAA (SEC)	84,462
9	Florida Gators	NCAA (SEC)	82,328
10	Clemson Tigers	NCAA (ACC)	80,400
11	South Carolina Gamecocks	NCAA (SEC)	73,628
12	Florida State Seminoles	NCAA (ACC)	68,288
13	Miami Hurricanes	NCAA (ACC)	61,469
14	Louisville Cardinals	NCAA (ACC)	61,290
15	Oklahoma State Cowboys	NCAA (Big 12)	60,218
16	Arkansas Razorbacks	NCAA (SEC)	59,884
17	Virginia Tech Hokies	NCAA (ACC)	59,574
18	West Virginia Mountaineers	NCAA (Big 12)	58,158
19	Mississippi State Bulldogs	NCAA (SEC)	58,057
20	Kentucky Wildcats	NCAA (SEC)	57,572
21	NC State Wolfpack	NCAA (ACC)	56,855
22	Texas Tech Red Raiders	NCAA (Big 12)	56,034
23	Ole Miss Rebels	NCAA (SEC)	55,685
24	Virginia Cavaliers	NCAA (ACC)	47,863
25	Baylor Bears	NCAA (Big 12)	44,915

=== Baseball ===
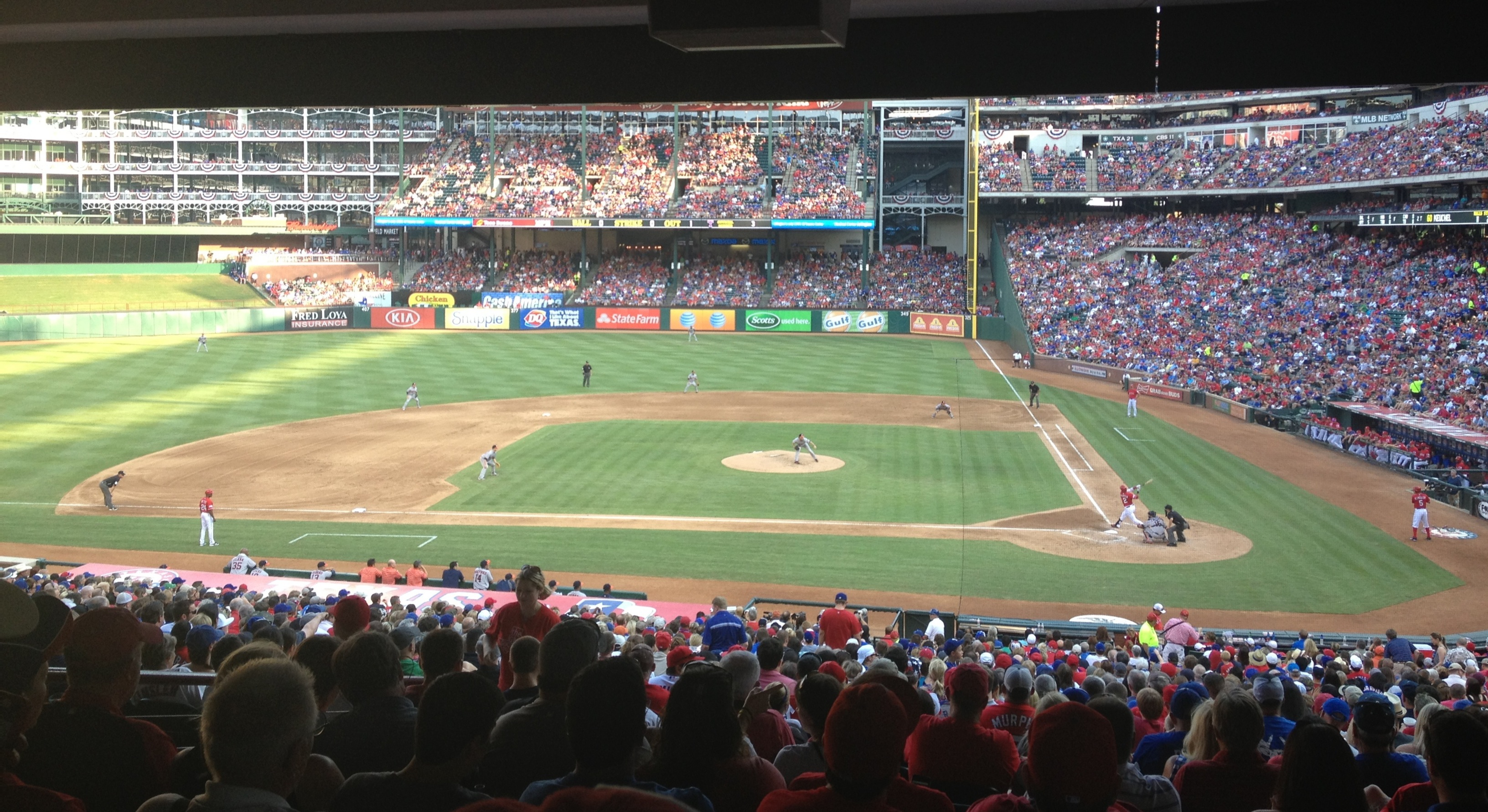
Houston vs Texas face-off during the 2013 Lone Star Series in the American League West division of Major League Baseball.

Baseball has been played in the Southern United States dating back to the mid-19th century. It was traditionally more popular than American football until the 1980s and still accounts for the largest annual attendance amongst sports played in the South. The first mention of a baseball team in Houston was on April 11, 1861. During the late 19th century and early 20th century games were common, especially once the professional leagues such as the Texas League, the Dixie League, and the Southern League were organized.

The short-lived Louisville Colonels were a part of the early National League and American Association, but ceased to exist in 1899. The first Southern Major League Baseball team after the Colonels appeared in 1962, when the Houston Colt .45s (known today as the Houston Astros) were enfranchised. Later, the Atlanta Braves came in 1966, followed by the Texas Rangers in 1972, and finally the Miami Marlins and Tampa Bay Rays in the 1990s.

College baseball appears to be more well attended in the South than elsewhere, as teams like Florida State, Arkansas, LSU, Virginia, Mississippi State, Ole Miss, South Carolina, Florida and Texas are commonly at the top of the NCAA's attendance. The South generally produces very successful collegiate baseball teams with Virginia, Vanderbilt, LSU, South Carolina, Florida Coastal Carolina and Tennessee winning recent College World Series Titles.

The following is a list of each MLB team in the Southern U.S. and the total fan attendance for 2019:

Rank	Team	League	2019 overall annual attendance
1	Houston Astros	American League	2,857,367
2	Atlanta Braves	National League	2,654,920
3	Washington Nationals	National League	2,259,781
4	Texas Rangers	American League	2,133,004
5	Baltimore Orioles	American League	1,307,807
6	Tampa Bay Rays	American League	1,178,735
7	Miami Marlins	National League	811,302

=== Auto racing ===
The start of the 2015 Daytona 500, the biggest race in NASCAR, at Daytona International Speedway in Daytona Beach, Florida

The Southern states are commonly associated with stock car racing and its most prominent competition level NASCAR, which is headquartered in Charlotte and Daytona Beach. The sport was developed in the South during the early 20th century, with stock car racing's historic mecca being Daytona Beach, where cars initially raced on the wide, flat beachfront, before the construction of Daytona International Speedway. Though the sport has attained a following throughout the United States, a majority of NASCAR races continue to take place at Southern tracks.

=== Basketball ===
Basketball is very popular throughout the Southern United States as both a recreational and spectator sport, particularly in the states of Kentucky and North Carolina. Both states are home to several prominent college basketball programs, including the Kentucky Wildcats, Louisville Cardinals, Duke Blue Devils and North Carolina Tar Heels. Other southern teams, like the Florida Gators and Virginia Cavaliers have won national championships.

NBA teams based in the South include the San Antonio Spurs, Houston Rockets, Oklahoma City Thunder, Dallas Mavericks, Washington Wizards, Charlotte Hornets, Atlanta Hawks, Orlando Magic, Memphis Grizzlies, New Orleans Pelicans, and Miami Heat. The Spurs and Heat in particular have become prominent within the NBA, with eight championships won by the two between 1999 and 2014.

=== Golf ===
Golf is a popular recreational sport in most areas of the South, with the region's warm climate allowing it to host many professional tournaments and numerous destination golf resorts, particularly in the state of Florida. The region is home to The Masters which is played at Augusta National Golf Club in Augusta, Georgia, and has become one of the professional game's most important tournaments. One of the four major championships in Hilton Head Island, in South Carolina, is also home to a prominent American golf tournament and has several high-quality courses.

=== Soccer ===
In recent decades, association football, known in the South as in the rest of the United States as "soccer", has become a popular sport at youth and collegiate levels throughout the region. The game has been historically widespread at the college level in the Atlantic coast states of Maryland, Virginia, and the Carolinas; which contain many of the nation's most successful college soccer programs. In women's soccer the North Carolina Tar Heels has won 22 national championships, by far the most of any school, and in men's soccer Virginia has won 7 NCAA National Championships, the third most of any school.

The establishment of Major League Soccer has led to professional soccer clubs in the Southern cities including FC Dallas, Houston Dynamo, D.C. United, Orlando City, Inter Miami, Nashville SC, Atlanta United, Austin FC and Charlotte FC. The current United States second division soccer league, the USL Championship, was initially geographically based in the coastal Southeast around clubs in Charleston, Richmond, Charlotte, Wilmington, Raleigh, Virginia Beach, and Atlanta.

=== Major sports teams in the South ===
The Southern region is home to numerous professional sports franchises in the "Big Five" leagues (NFL, NBA, MLS, NHL, and MLB), with many championships collectively among them. Professional sports leagues such as the National Football League (NFL), Major League Baseball (MLB), National Basketball Association (NBA), Women's National Basketball Association (WNBA), National Hockey League (NHL), Major League Soccer (MLS), and National Women's Soccer League (NWSL), have team franchises in following cities/metropolitan areas of the region:

- Dallas-Fort Worth: Cowboys (NFL), Rangers (MLB), Mavericks (NBA), Stars (NHL), FC Dallas (MLS), Wings (WNBA)
- Washington, D.C.: Commanders (NFL), Nationals (MLB), Wizards (NBA), Capitals (NHL), United or the Eagles (MLS), Mystics (WNBA), Spirit (NWSL)
- Miami-Fort Lauderdale: Dolphins (NFL), Marlins (MLB), Heat (NBA), Panthers (NHL), Inter or the Herons (MLS)
- Houston: Texans (NFL), Astros (MLB), Rockets (NBA), Dynamo (MLS), Dash (NWSL)
- Atlanta: Falcons (NFL), Braves (MLB), Hawks (NBA), United (MLS), Dream (WNBA)
- Tampa Bay: Buccaneers (NFL), Rays (MLB), Lightning (NHL)
- Baltimore: Ravens (NFL), Orioles (MLB)
- Charlotte: Panthers (NFL), Hornets (NBA), Charlotte FC or the Crown (MLS)
- Nashville: Titans (NFL), Predators (NHL), Nashville SC (MLS)
- New Orleans: Saints (NFL), Pelicans (NBA)
- Orlando: Magic (NBA), Orlando City SC or the Lions (MLS), Pride (NWSL)
- San Antonio: Spurs (NBA)
- Jacksonville: Jaguars (NFL)
- Oklahoma City: Thunder (NBA)
- Memphis: Grizzlies (NBA)
- Raleigh: Hurricanes (NHL)
- Austin: Austin FC (MLS)
- Cary, North Carolina: Courage (NWSL)
- Louisville, Kentucky: Racing (NWSL)

=== Alabama ===
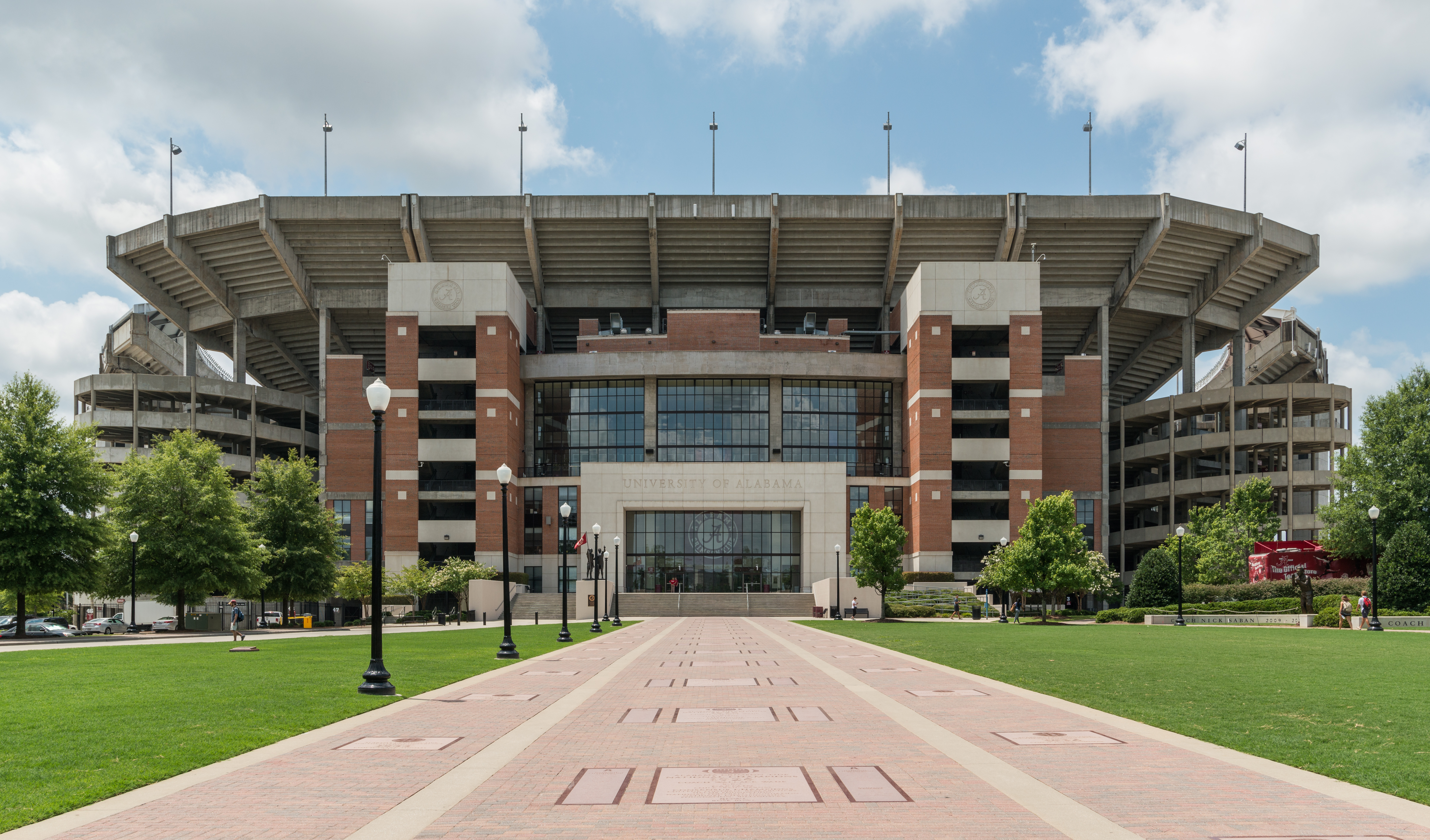
Bryant–Denny Stadium at the University of Alabama in Tuscaloosa

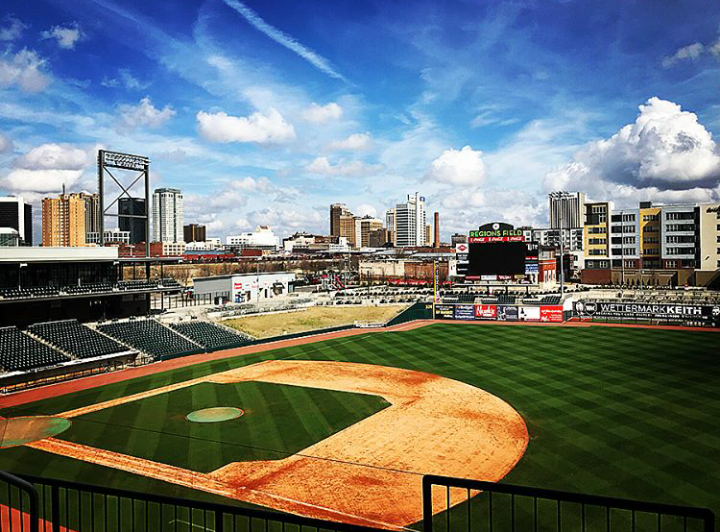
Regions Field in Birmingham

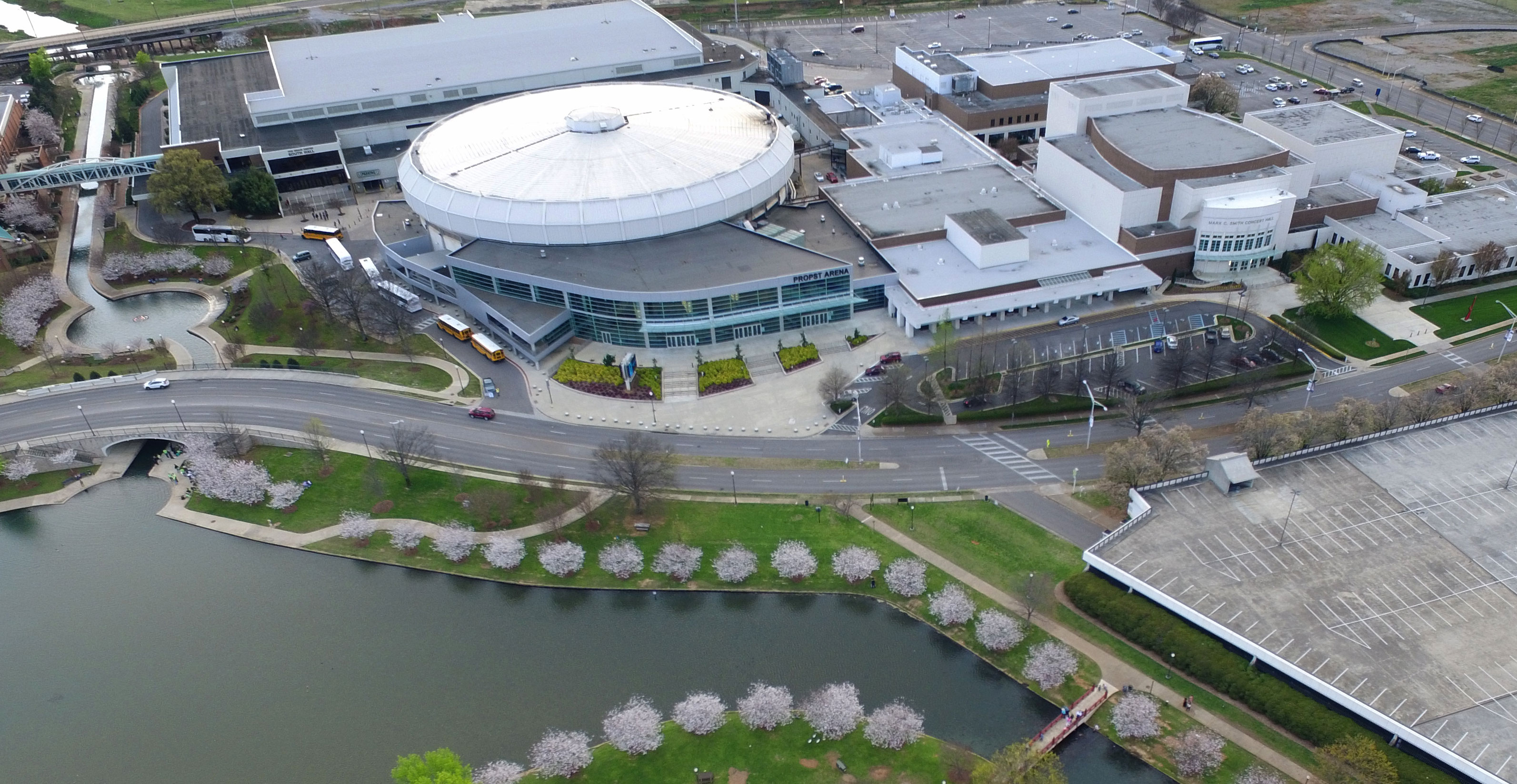
Von Braun Center in Huntsville

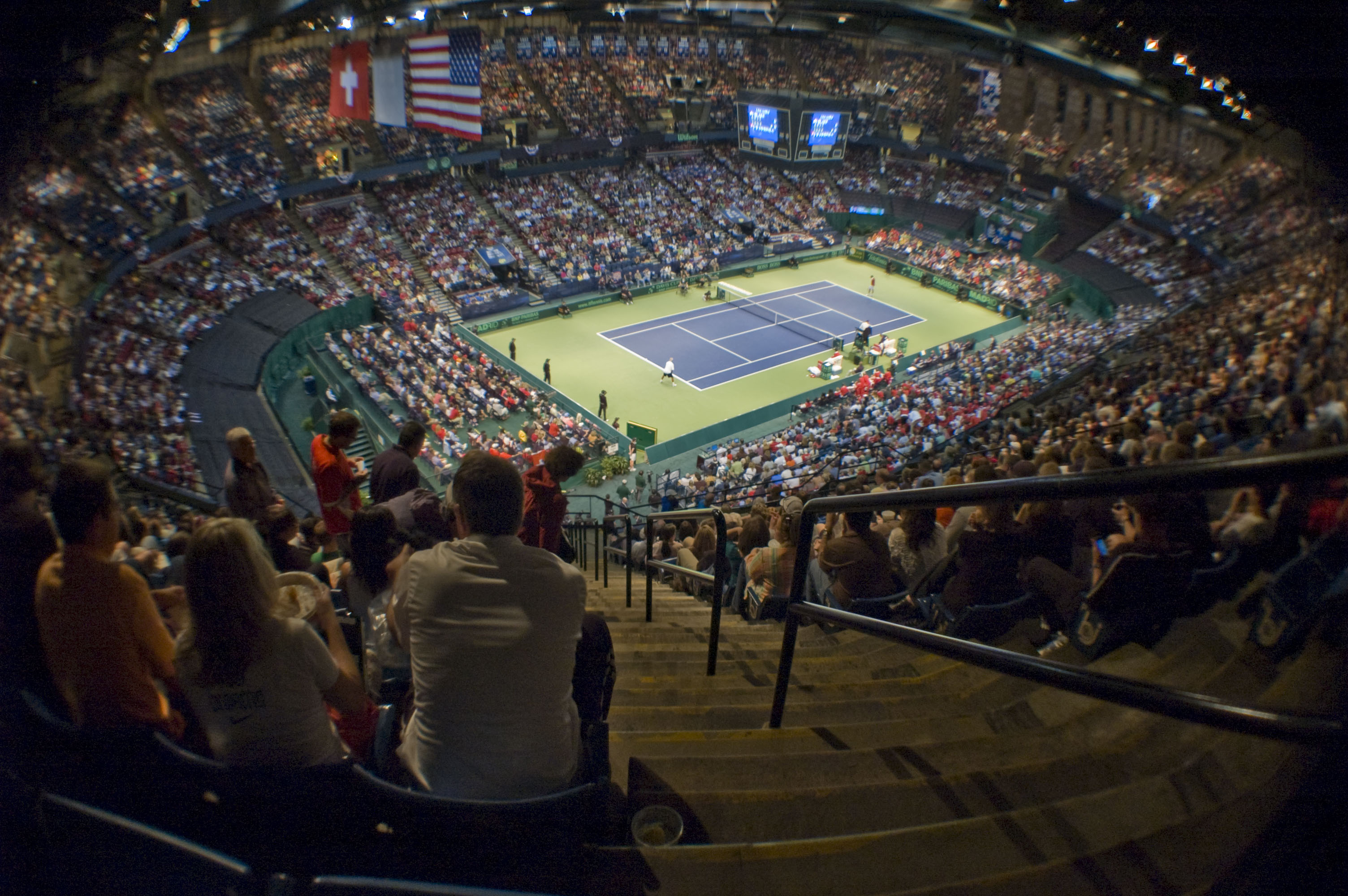
Birmingham–Jefferson Convention Complex in Birmingham

==== Professional sports ====
Alabama has several professional and semi-professional sports teams, including three minor league baseball teams.

Club	City	Sport	League	Venue
AFC Mobile	Mobile	Soccer	Gulf Coast Premier League	Archbishop Lipscomb Athletic Complex
Birmingham Bulls	Pelham	Ice hockey	Southern Professional Hockey League	Pelham Civic Center
Birmingham Legion FC	Birmingham	Soccer	USL Championship	PNC Field
Birmingham Barons	Birmingham	Baseball	Southern League (Double-A)	Regions Field
Birmingham Stallions	Birmingham	Football	United Football League	Protective Stadium
Huntsville Havoc	Huntsville	Ice hockey	Southern Professional Hockey League	Von Braun Center
Montgomery Biscuits	Montgomery	Baseball	Southern League (Double-A)	Montgomery Riverwalk Stadium
Rocket City Trash Pandas	Madison	Baseball	Southern League (Double-A)	Toyota Field
Tennessee Valley Tigers	Huntsville	Football	Independent Women's Football League	Milton Frank Stadium

The Talladega Superspeedway motorsports complex hosts a series of NASCAR events. It has a seating capacity of 143,000 and is the 13th largest stadium in the world and sixth largest stadium in America. Also, the Barber Motorsports Park has hosted IndyCar Series and Rolex Sports Car Series races.

The ATP Birmingham was a World Championship Tennis tournament held from 1973 to 1980.

Alabama has hosted several professional golf tournaments, such as the 1984 and 1990 PGA Championship at Shoal Creek, the Barbasol Championship (PGA Tour), the Mobile LPGA Tournament of Champions, Airbus LPGA Classic, and Yokohama Tire LPGA Classic (LPGA Tour), and The Tradition (Champions Tour).

==== College sports ====
College football is extremely popular in Alabama, particularly the University of Alabama Crimson Tide and Auburn University Tigers, rivals in the Southeastern Conference. Alabama averages over 100,000 fans per game and Auburn averages over 80,000—both numbers among the top 20 in the nation. Bryant–Denny Stadium is the home of the Alabama football team, and has a seating capacity of 101,821, and is the fifth largest stadium in America. Jordan-Hare Stadium is the home field of the Auburn football team and seats up to 87,451.

Protective Stadium is home of the UAB Blazers football program and the Birmingham Bowl. Proctective Stadium has 45,000 seats. Opening in 2020, Hancock Whitney Stadium in Mobile is the home of the University of South Alabama football team, and serves as the home of the Reese's Senior Bowl, the AHSAA North/South All-star Game, and the LendingTree Bowl; the stadium seats 25,450. In 2009, Bryant–Denny Stadium and Jordan-Hare Stadium became the homes of the Alabama High School Athletic Association state football championship games, after previously being held at Legion Field in Birmingham.

=== Arkansas ===
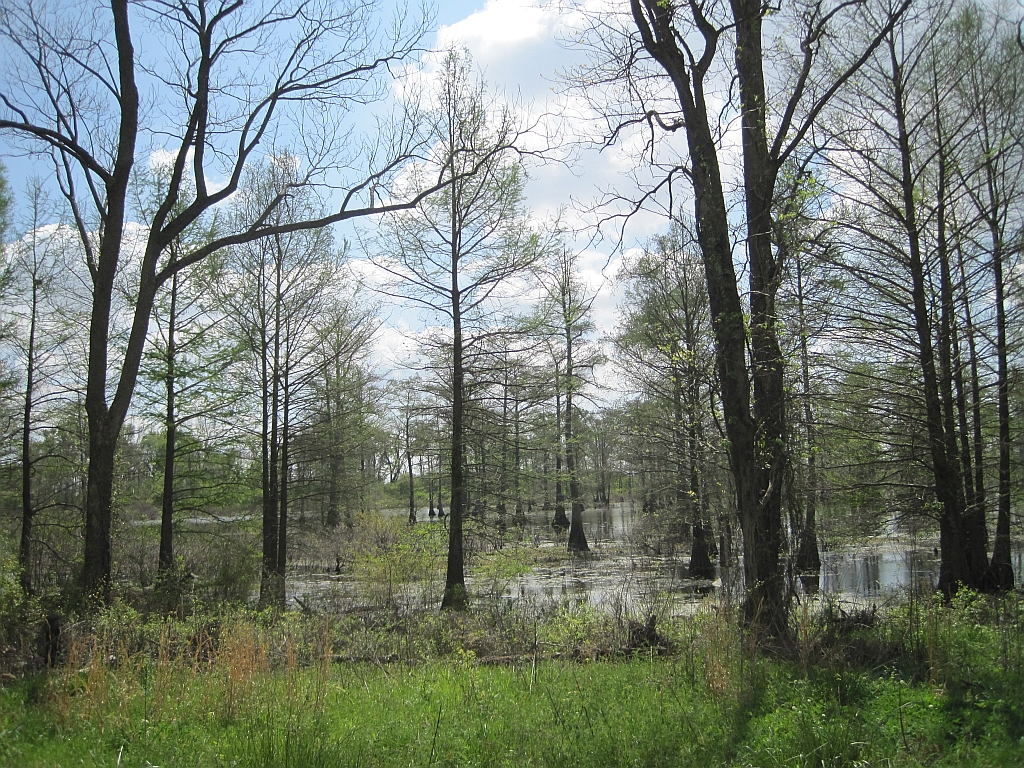
The flooded, forested bottomlands of east Arkansas attract wintering waterfowl.

Team sports and especially collegiate football are important to Arkansans. College football in Arkansas began from humble beginnings, when the University of Arkansas first fielded a team in 1894. Over the years, many Arkansans have looked to Arkansas Razorbacks football as the public image of the state. Although the University of Arkansas is based in Fayetteville, the Razorbacks have always played at least one game per season at War Memorial Stadium in Little Rock in an effort to keep fan support in central and south Arkansas.

Arkansas State University became the second NCAA Division I Football Bowl Subdivision (FBS) (then known as Division I-A) team in the state in 1992 after playing in lower divisions for nearly two decades. The two schools have never played each other, due to the University of Arkansas's policy of not playing intrastate games. Two other campuses of the University of Arkansas System are Division I members. The University of Arkansas at Pine Bluff is a member of the Southwestern Athletic Conference, a league whose members all play football in the second-level Football Championship Subdivision (FCS). The University of Arkansas at Little Rock, known for sports purposes as Little Rock, joined the Ohio Valley Conference in 2022 after playing in the Sun Belt Conference; unlike many other OVC members, it does not field a football program. In July 2026, Little Rock will move to the United Athletic Conference, which is transitioning from a football-only league to an all-sports conference via a rebranding of the Western Athletic Conference. It will be one of two UAC members without a football program. The state's other Division I member is the University of Central Arkansas (UCA), which joined the Atlantic Sun Conference (then officially the ASUN Conference) in 2021 after leaving the FCS Southland Conference. UCA, which played in the football-only version of the UAC from 2023 to 2025, will move from the ASUN to the all-sports UAC in July 2026. Seven of Arkansas's smaller colleges play in NCAA Division II, with six in the Great American Conference and one in the MIAA. Two other small Arkansas colleges compete in NCAA Division III, in which athletic scholarships are prohibited. High school football also began to grow in Arkansas in the early 20th century.

Baseball runs deep in Arkansas and was popular before the state hosted Major League Baseball (MLB) spring training in Hot Springs from 1886 to the 1920s. Two minor league teams are based in the state. The Arkansas Travelers play at Dickey–Stephens Park in North Little Rock, and the Northwest Arkansas Naturals play in Arvest Ballpark in Springdale. Both teams compete in the Texas League.

Hunting continues in the state. The state created the Arkansas Game and Fish Commission in 1915 to regulate hunting. Today a significant portion of Arkansas's population participates in hunting duck in the Mississippi flyway and deer across the state. Ducks Unlimited has called Stuttgart, Arkansas, "the epicenter of the duck universe". Millions of acres of public land are available for both bow and modern gun hunters.

Fishing has always been popular in Arkansas, and the sport and the state have benefited from the creation of reservoirs across the state. Following the completion of Norfork Dam, the Norfork Tailwater and the White River have become a destination for trout fishers. Several smaller retirement communities such as Bull Shoals, Hot Springs Village, and Fairfield Bay have flourished due to their position on a fishing lake. The National Park Service has preserved the Buffalo National River in its natural state and fly fishers visit it annually.

Arkansas has a fleeting association with ice hockey in the United States. The Arkansas GlacierCats debuted in 1998 at the Barton Coliseum in Little Rock. Attendance dropped after a solid first season. Dave Berryman sold a 51% interest in the team to Equity Media Holdings in 2001 but the team's situation continued to worsen. By 2002 the team saw fewer than 3,000 fans per game and, despite seeing a slight increase in their fourth season, the team folded in 2003. The following year, junior hockey came to Arkansas with the Texarkana Bandits. The team began well, posting a winning season in its first year and then increasing its win total over the following two campaigns. Unfortunately, when a more promising spot opened in the St. Louis market, the team moved despite increased interest from the local community. The University of Arkansas fields an American Collegiate Hockey Association (ACHA) team known as the Arkansas Razorbacks Hockey Club. The team competes in Division II & III of the ACHA and has contributed to the growth of ice hockey in Arkansas since its establishment in 2007. The program has achieved significant milestones, including multiple regional tournament appearances and fostering the development of college hockey in the region. As of 2023, no players from Arkansas have achieved notability in ice hockey. The state, has one of the lowest engagement rates in the nation with just 415 people registered with USA Hockey in 2022: 48th in the nation.

=== Florida ===
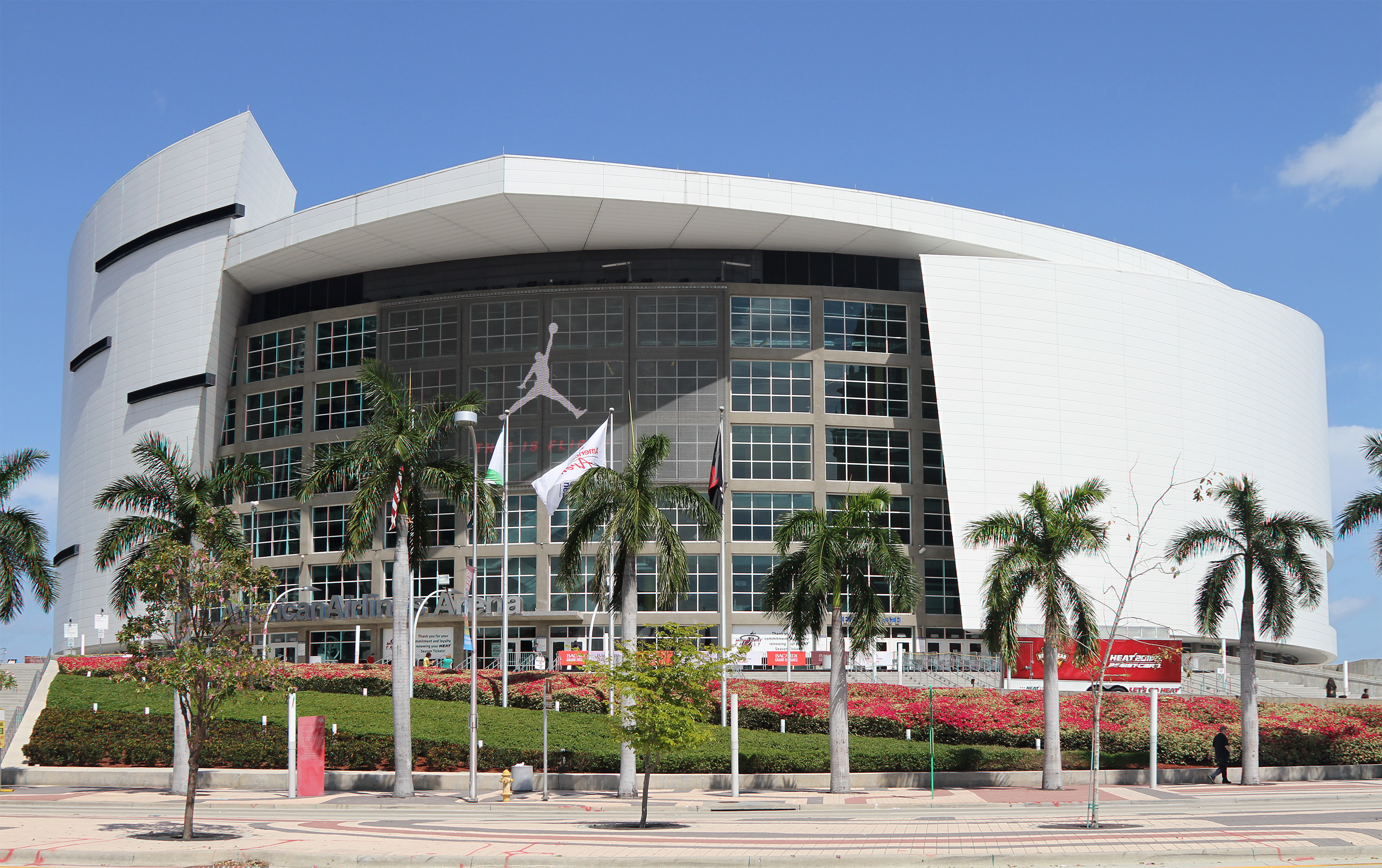
Kaseya Center in Miami

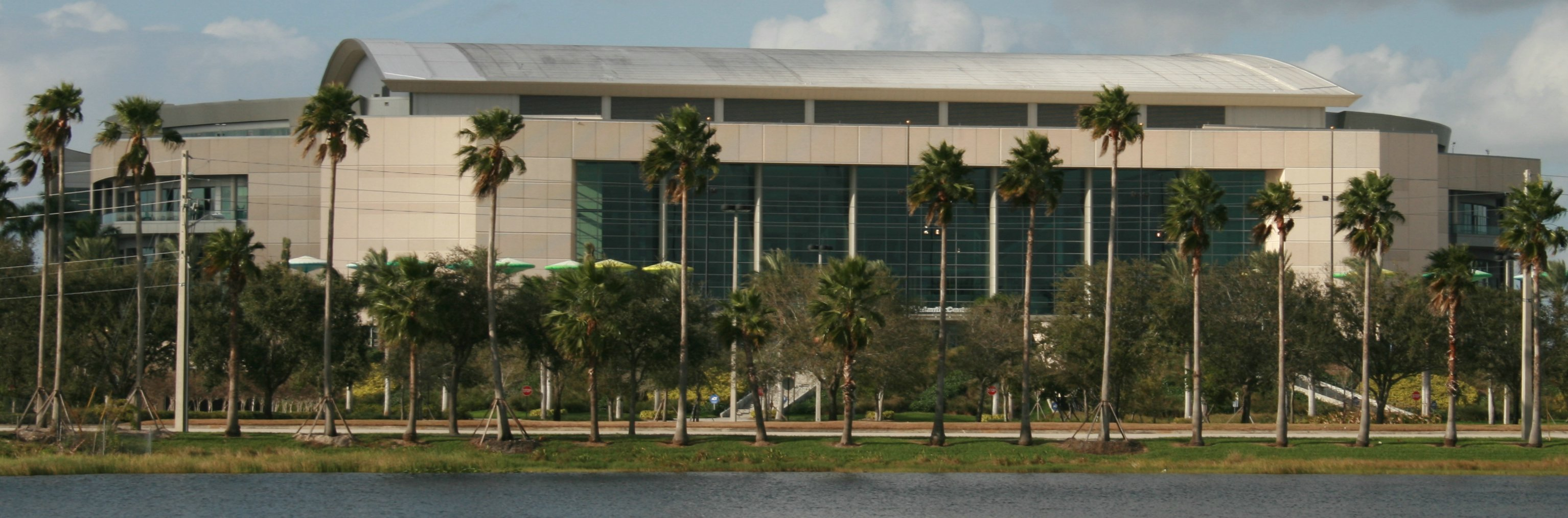
Amerant Bank Arena in Sunrise

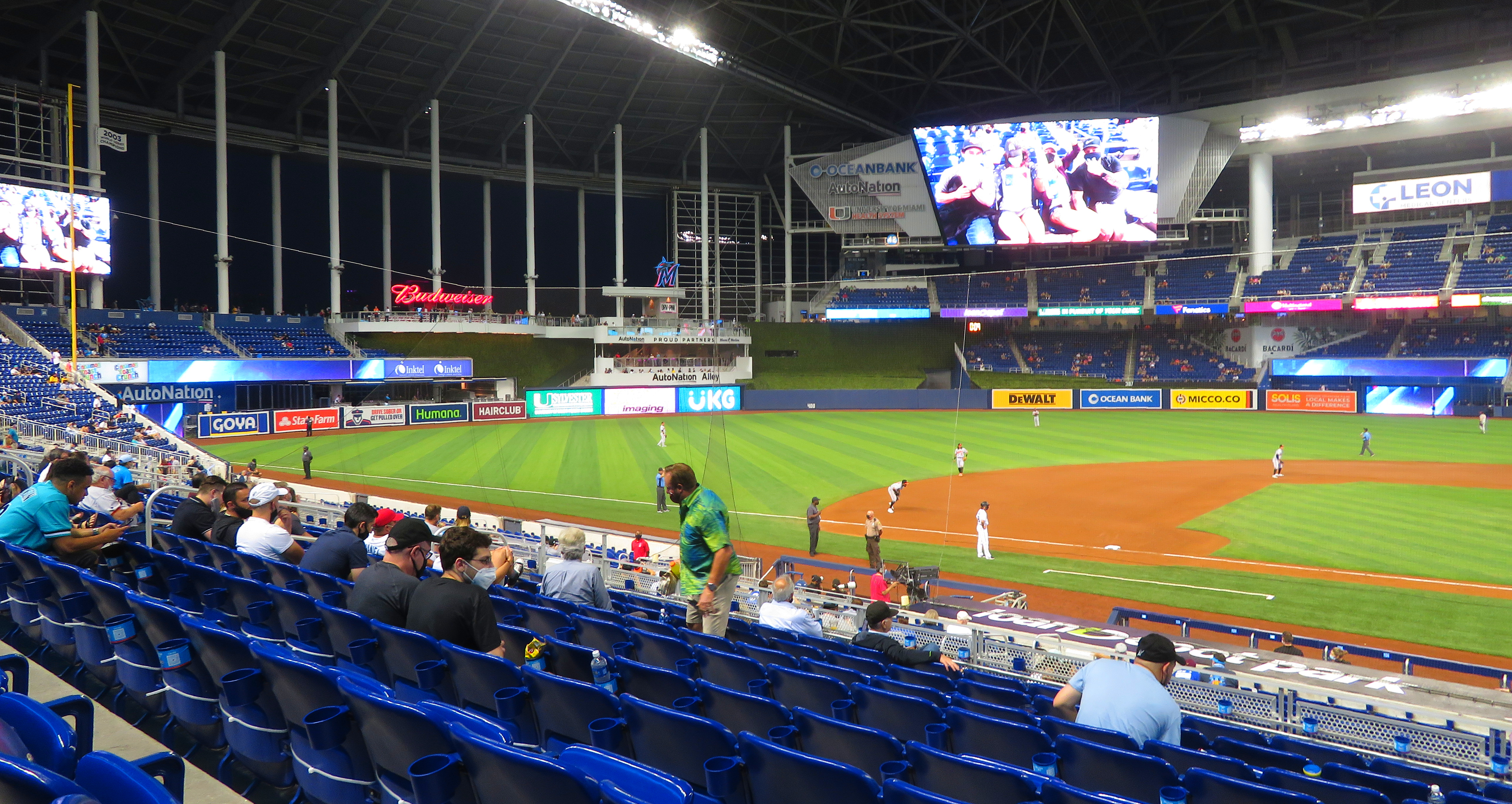
LoanDepot Park in Little Havana, home field of the Miami Marlins of Major League Baseball

Daytona International Speedway, home to various auto racing events, including the Daytona 500

Florida has three NFL teams, two MLB teams, two NBA teams, two NHL teams, and two MLS teams. Florida gained its first permanent major-league professional sports team in 1966 when the American Football League added the Miami Dolphins. Florida has given professional sports franchises some subsidies in the form of tax breaks since 1991.

About half of all Major League Baseball teams conduct spring training in the state, with teams informally organized into the "Grapefruit League". Throughout MLB history, other teams have held spring training in Florida.

NASCAR (headquartered in Daytona Beach) begins all three of its major auto racing series in Florida at Daytona International Speedway in February, featuring the Daytona 500. Daytona also has the Coke Zero Sugar 400 NASCAR race weekend in August. NASCAR also has a race weekend at Homestead-Miami Speedway in Homestead in October. The 24 Hours of Daytona is one of the world's most prestigious endurance auto races. The Grand Prix of St. Petersburg and Grand Prix of Miami have held IndyCar races as well.

Florida is a major golf hub. The PGA of America is headquartered in Palm Beach Gardens, the PGA Tour is headquartered in Ponte Vedra Beach (a Jacksonville suburb) and the LPGA is headquartered in Daytona Beach. The Players Championship, WGC-Cadillac Championship, Arnold Palmer Invitational, Honda Classic and Valspar Championship are PGA Tour rounds.

Florida has teams in all five American major league sports. Florida's most recent major-league team, Inter Miami, began play in MLS in 2020.

The Miami Masters is an ATP World Tour Masters 1000 and WTA Premier tennis event, whereas the Delray Beach International Tennis Championships is an ATP World Tour 250 event.

There are minor league baseball, football, basketball, ice hockey, soccer and indoor football teams based in Florida. Ben Hill Griffin Stadium is the largest football stadium in Florida, the 12th-largest stadium in college football, and the 18th-largest stadium in the world, as measured by its official seating capacity of 88,548—though, it has often held over 90,000 for Florida's home football games.

Florida's universities have a number of collegiate sport programs. Major college football programs include the Florida State Seminoles and Miami Hurricanes of the Atlantic Coast Conference, and the Florida Gators of the Southeastern Conference. Since 1996, Florida has added four additional teams to the ranks of Division I FBS: UCF Knights, South Florida Bulls, Florida Atlantic Owls and FIU Panthers.

=== Georgia ===
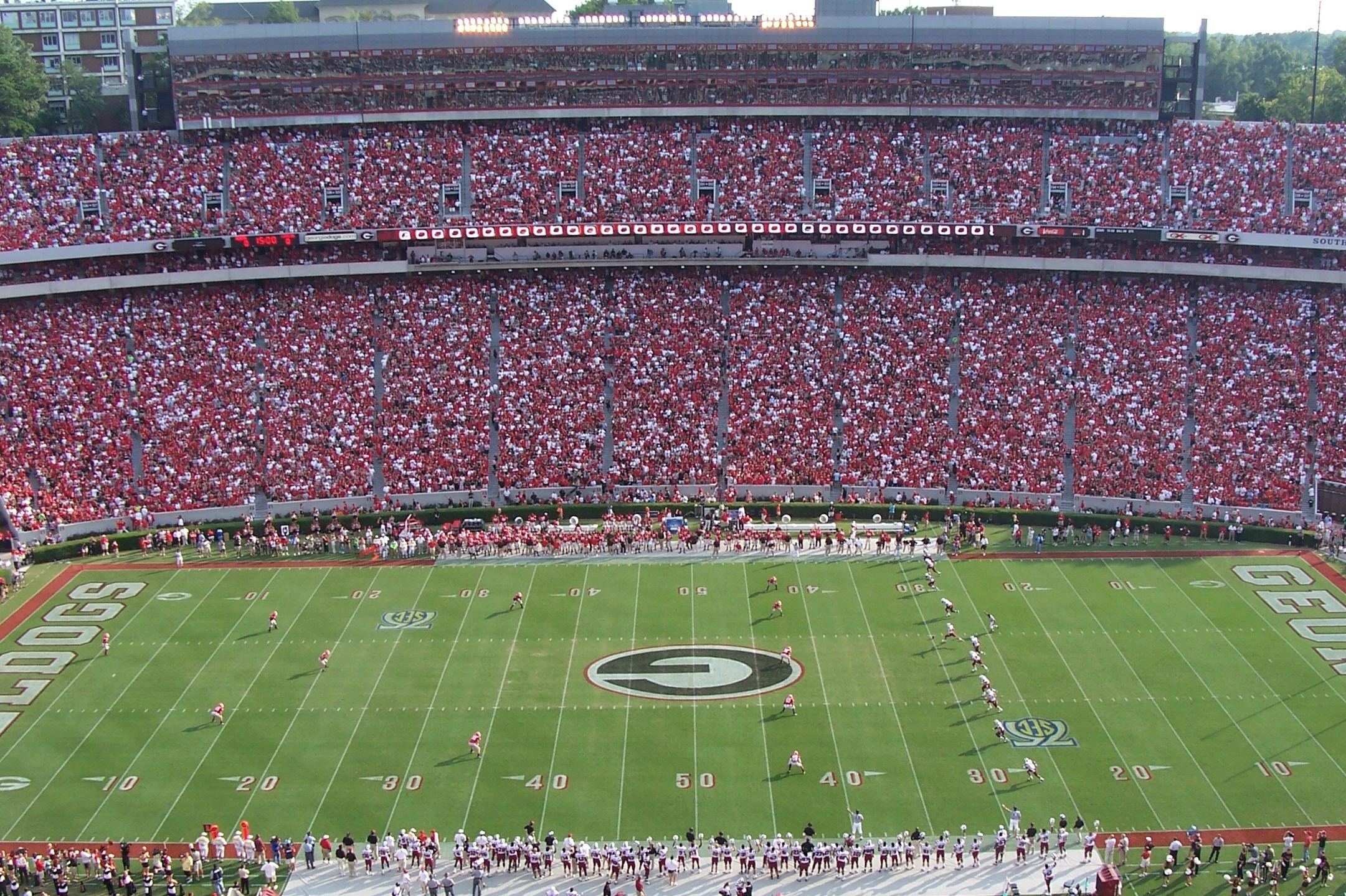
Kickoff, Sanford Stadium, Athens

Sports in Georgia include professional teams in nearly all major sports, Olympic Games contenders and medalists, collegiate teams in major and small-school conferences and associations, and active amateur teams and individual sports. The state of Georgia has teams in four major professional leagues—the Atlanta Braves of Major League Baseball, the Atlanta Falcons of the National Football League, the Atlanta Hawks of the National Basketball Association, and Atlanta United FC of Major League Soccer.

The Georgia Bulldogs (Southeastern Conference), Georgia Tech Yellow Jackets (Atlantic Coast Conference), Georgia State Panthers and Georgia Southern Eagles (Sun Belt Conference), and Kennesaw State Owls (Conference USA) are Georgia's NCAA Division I FBS football teams, having won multiple national championships between them. The Georgia Bulldogs and the Georgia Tech Yellow Jackets have a historical rivalry in college football known as Clean, Old-Fashioned Hate, and the Georgia State Panthers and the Georgia Southern Eagles have recently developed their own rivalry.

The 1996 Summer Olympics took place in Atlanta. The stadium that was built to host various Olympic events was converted to Turner Field, home of the Atlanta Braves through 2016. Atlanta served as a host city for the 2026 FIFA World Cup.

The Masters golf tournament, the first of the PGA Tour's four "majors", is held annually the second weekend of April at the Augusta National Golf Club.

The RSM Classic is a golf tournament on the PGA Tour, played in the autumn in Saint Simons Island, Georgia.

The Atlanta Motor Speedway hosts the Dixie 500 NASCAR Cup Series stock car race and Road Atlanta the Petit Le Mans endurance sports car race.

Atlanta's Georgia Dome hosted Super Bowl XXVIII in 1994 and Super Bowl XXXIV in 2000. The dome has hosted the NCAA Final Four Men's Basketball National Championship in 2002, 2007, and 2013. It hosted WWE's WrestleMania XXVII in 2011, an event which set an attendance record of 71,617. The venue was also the site of the annual Chick-fil-A Peach Bowl post-season college football games. Since 2017, they have been held at the Mercedes-Benz Stadium along with the FIRST World Championships.

Professional baseball's Ty Cobb was the first player inducted into the Baseball Hall of Fame. He was from Narrows, Georgia and was nicknamed the "Georgia Peach".

The Mercedes-Benz Stadium hosted Super Bowl LIII in 2018 and the CFP National Championship in the same year, the SEC Championship Game in 2017, the MLS All-Star Game in 2018, the MLS Cup in 2018, and the record-setting friendly fixture between Mexico Men's National Football Team and Honduras Men's National Football Team.

WWE Hall of Famer Hulk Hogan is from Augusta, Georgia, and State Farm Arena is to host RAW on January 27, 2025. Atlanta has also hosted WrestleMania XXVII and the 2002 and 2010 Royal Rumble. State Farm Arena also hosted Bad Blood (2024).

=== Kentucky ===
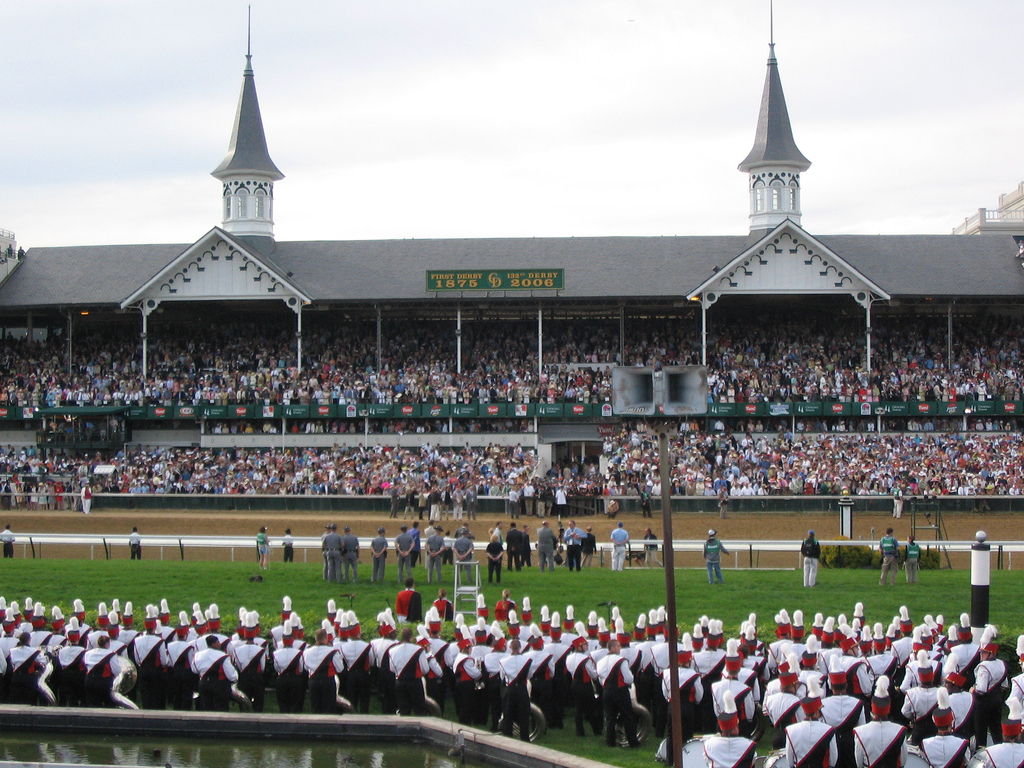
Kentucky's Churchill Downs hosts the Kentucky Derby.

Kentucky is the home of sports teams such as Minor League Baseball's Triple-A Louisville Bats and High-A Bowling Green Hot Rods. It is home to the independent Atlantic League of Professional Baseball's Lexington Legends and the Frontier League's Florence Y'alls. The Lexington Horsemen and Louisville Fire of the now-defunct af2 had been interested in making a move up to the "major league" Arena Football League, but nothing has come of those plans.

The northern part of the state lies across the Ohio River from Cincinnati, which is home to the National Football League's Cincinnati Bengals, Major League Baseball's Cincinnati Reds. It is not uncommon for fans to park in the city of Newport and use the Newport Southbank Pedestrian Bridge, locally known as the "Purple People Bridge", to walk to these games in Cincinnati. Georgetown College in Georgetown was the location for the Bengals' summer training camp, until it was announced in 2012 that the Bengals would no longer use the facilities.

As in many states, especially those without major league professional sports teams, college athletics are prominent. This is especially true of the state's three Division I Football Bowl Subdivision (FBS) programs, including the Kentucky Wildcats, the Western Kentucky Hilltoppers, and the Louisville Cardinals. The Wildcats, Hilltoppers, and Cardinals are among the most tradition-rich college men's basketball teams in the United States, combining for 11 National Championships and 24 NCAA Final Fours; all three are high on the lists of total all-time wins, wins per season, and average wins per season.

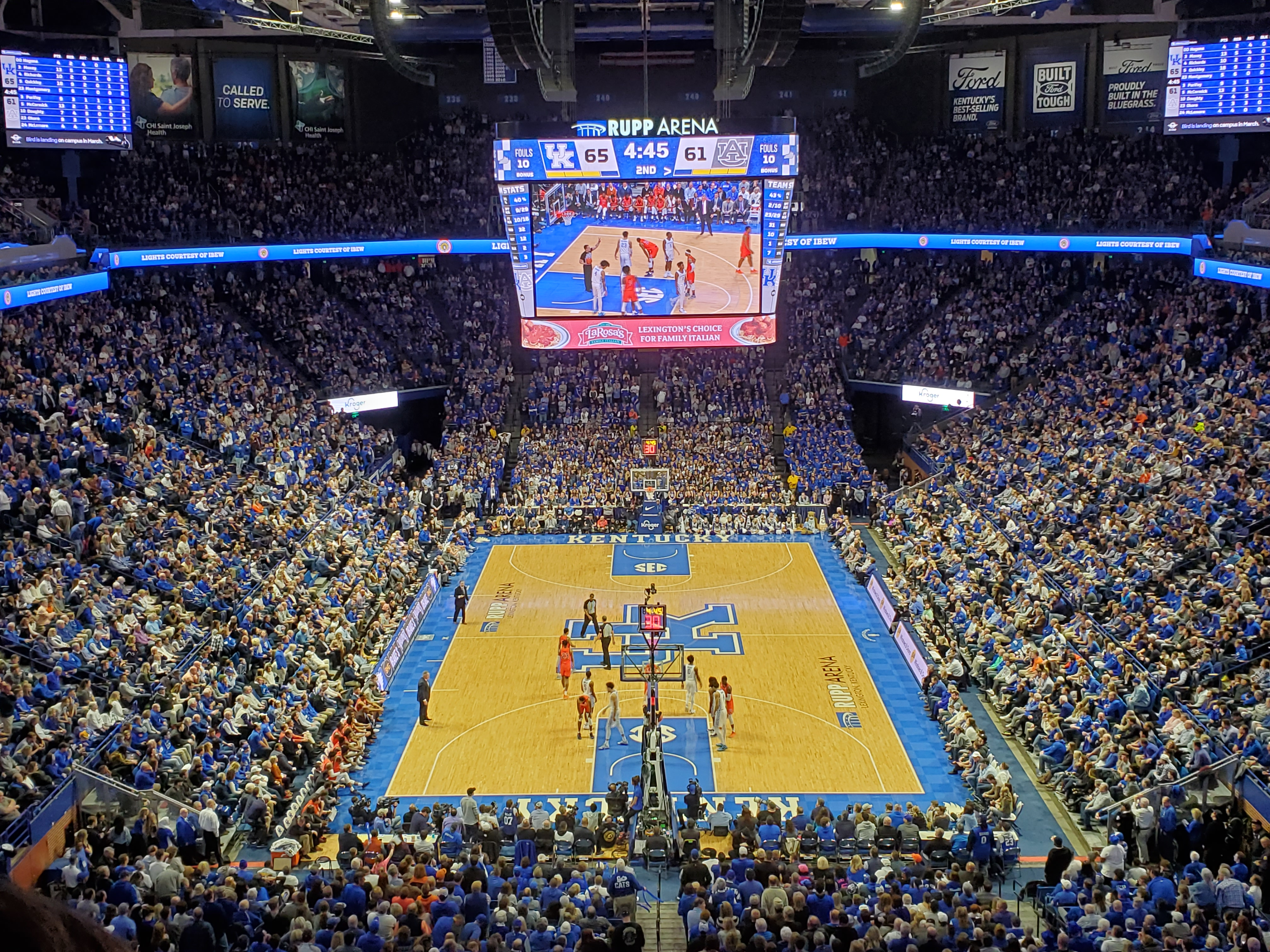
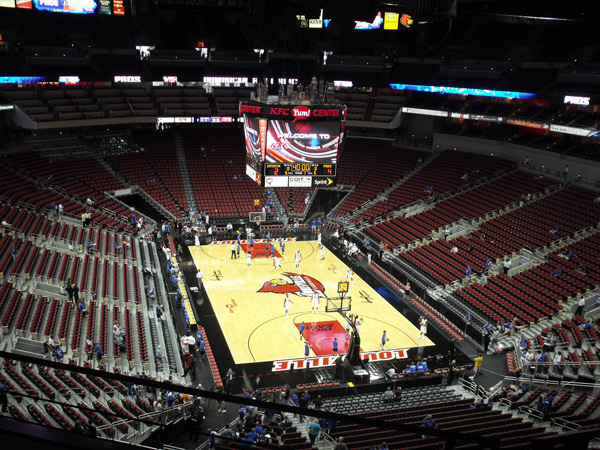
College Basketball enjoys significant popularity in Kentucky, with the University of Kentucky's Rupp Arena (left), and the University of Louisville's KFC Yum! Center (right) ranking 2nd and 3rd in capacity among college basketball arenas.

The Kentucky Wildcats are particularly notable, leading all Division I programs in all-time wins, win percentage, NCAA tournament appearances, and being second only to UCLA in NCAA championships. Louisville has stepped onto the football scene, including winning the 2007 Orange Bowl as well as the 2013 Sugar Bowl, and producing 2016 Heisman Trophy winner Lamar Jackson. Western Kentucky, the 2002 national champion in Division I-AA football (now Football Championship Subdivision (FCS)), completed its transition to Division I FBS football in 2009.

The Kentucky Derby is a horse race held annually in Louisville on the first Saturday in May. The Valhalla Golf Club in Louisville has hosted several editions of the PGA Championship, Senior PGA Championship and Ryder Cup since the 1990s.

The NASCAR Cup Series held a race at the Kentucky Speedway in Sparta, Kentucky from 2011 to 2020. The NASCAR Nationwide Series and the Camping World Truck Series raced there through 2020. The IndyCar Series previously raced there as well.

Ohio Valley Wrestling in Louisville was the primary location for training and rehab for WWE professional wrestlers from 2000 until 2008, when WWE moved its contracted talent to Florida Championship Wrestling. OVW later became the primary developmental territory for Total Nonstop Action Wrestling (TNA) from 2011 to 2013.

In 2014 Louisville City FC, a professional soccer team in the league then known as USL Pro and now as the United Soccer League, was announced. The team made its debut in 2015, playing home games at Louisville Slugger Field. In its first season, Louisville City was the official reserve side for Orlando City SC, who made its debut in Major League Soccer at the same time. That arrangement ended in 2016 when Orlando City established a directly controlled reserve side in the USL. In 2021, Lexington SC was founded as a professional soccer team out of Lexington, competing in USL League One. They played their home games at Toyota Stadium until construction on Lexington SC Stadium was completed in 2024. In 2025, they joined the USL Championship league. The club has companion women's teams that compete in the USL W League and USL Super League.

=== Louisiana ===
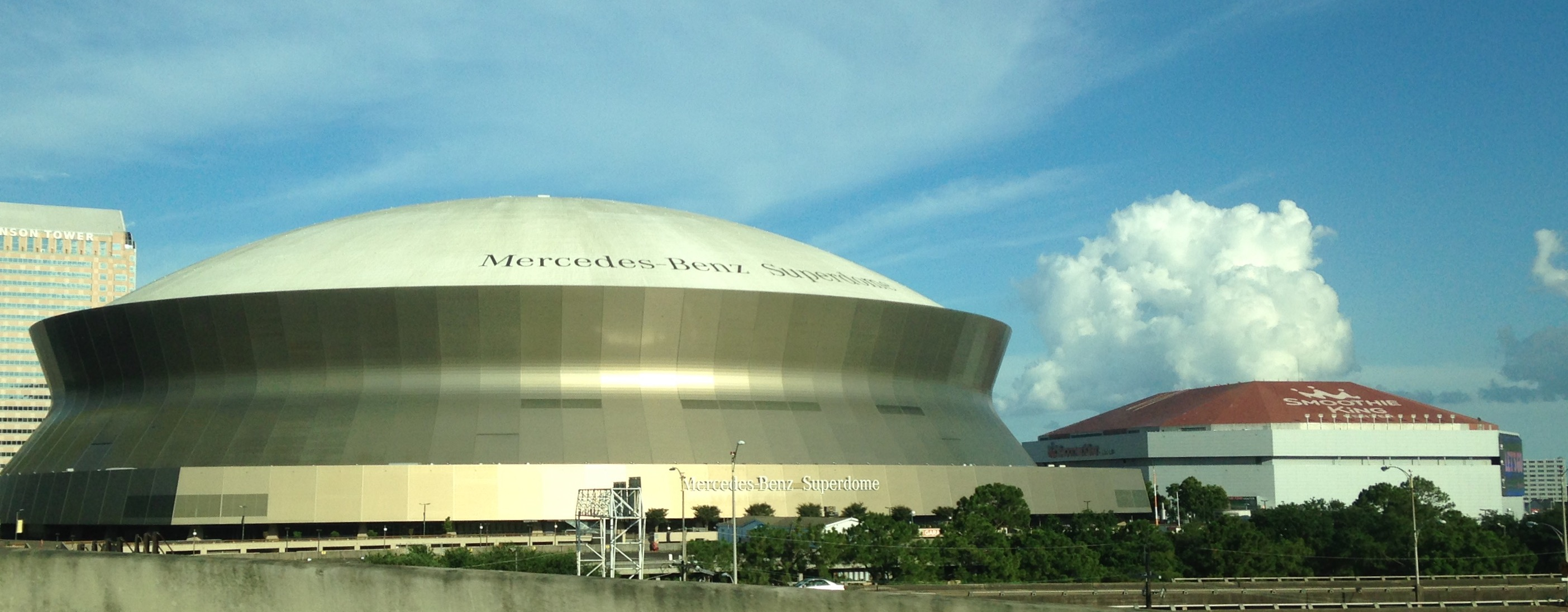
Caesars Superdome and Smoothie King Center in New Orleans.

Louisiana is the least populous state with more than one major professional sports league franchise: the National Basketball Association's New Orleans Pelicans and the National Football League's New Orleans Saints.

Louisiana has 12 collegiate NCAA Division I programs, a high number given its population. The state has no NCAA Division II teams and only two NCAA Division III teams. As of 2019, the LSU Tigers football team has won 12 Southeastern Conference titles, six Sugar Bowls and four national championships.

Each year New Orleans plays host to the Bayou Classic, and the New Orleans Bowl college football games, while Shreveport hosts the Independence Bowl. New Orleans has hosted the Super Bowl a record eleven times, as well as the BCS National Championship Game, NBA All-Star Game and NCAA Men's Division I Basketball Championship.

The Zurich Classic of New Orleans, is a PGA Tour golf tournament held since 1938. The Rock 'n' Roll Mardi Gras Marathon and Crescent City Classic are two road running competitions held at New Orleans.

As of 2016, Louisiana was the birthplace of the most NFL players per capita for the eighth year in a row.

Louisiana State University has a total of 48 NCAA Division I national sports championships throughout the school's history. The most recent championship is the college baseball championship in May 2025.

=== Mississippi ===
- Biloxi is home to the Biloxi Shuckers baseball team, the Double-A minor league affiliate of the Milwaukee Brewers and member of the Southern League playing at Keesler Federal Park, and the Biloxi Breakers hockey team, a member of the Federal Prospects Hockey League playing at Mississippi Coast Coliseum.
- Clinton is home to the Mississippi Brilla FC, a USL League Two soccer team.
- Southaven is home to the Memphis Hustle basketball team. The Hustle are an affiliate of the Memphis Grizzlies. They play in the NBA G League.

=== North Carolina ===
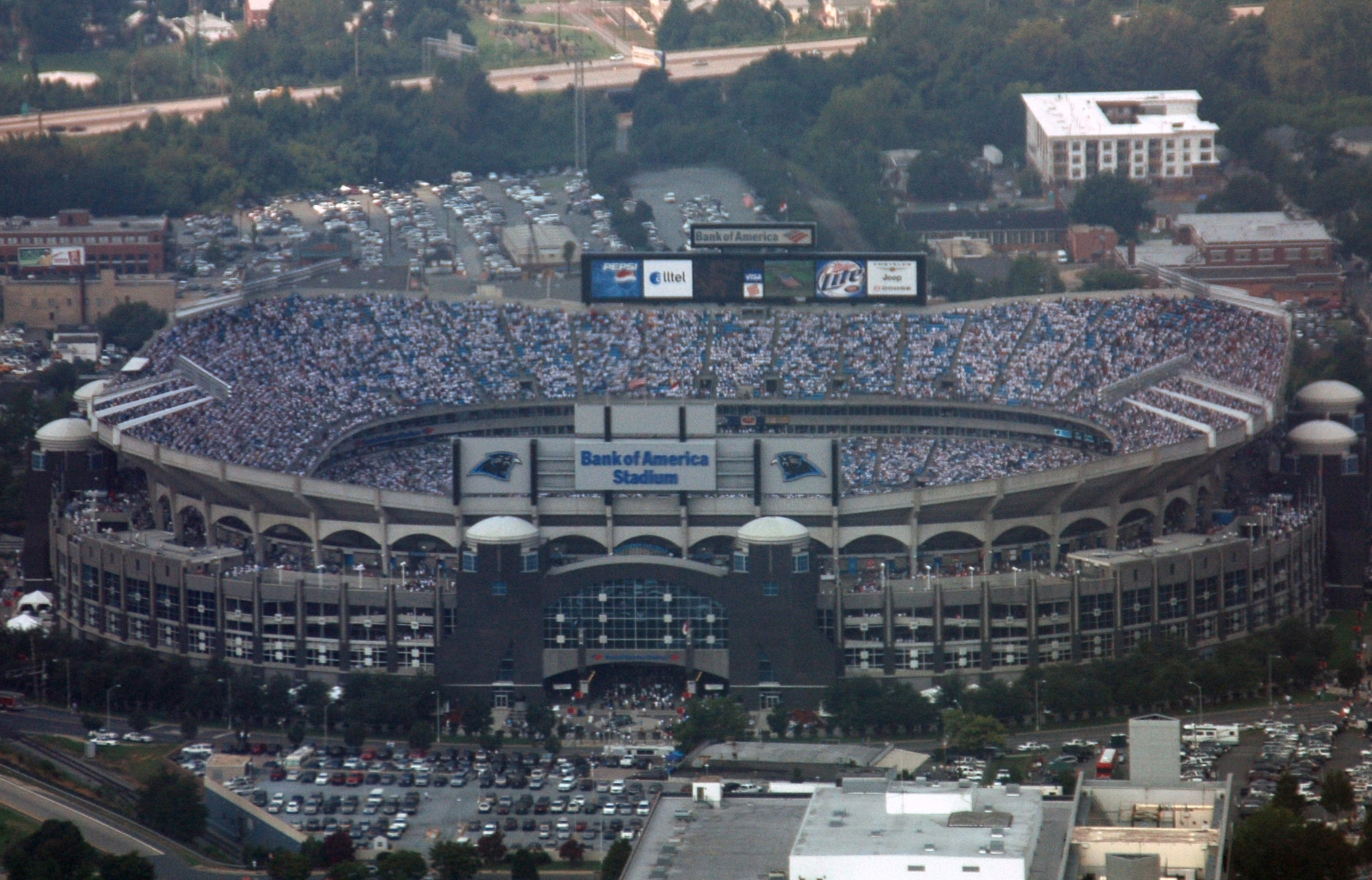
Bank of America Stadium in Charlotte, home of the Carolina Panthers and Charlotte FC

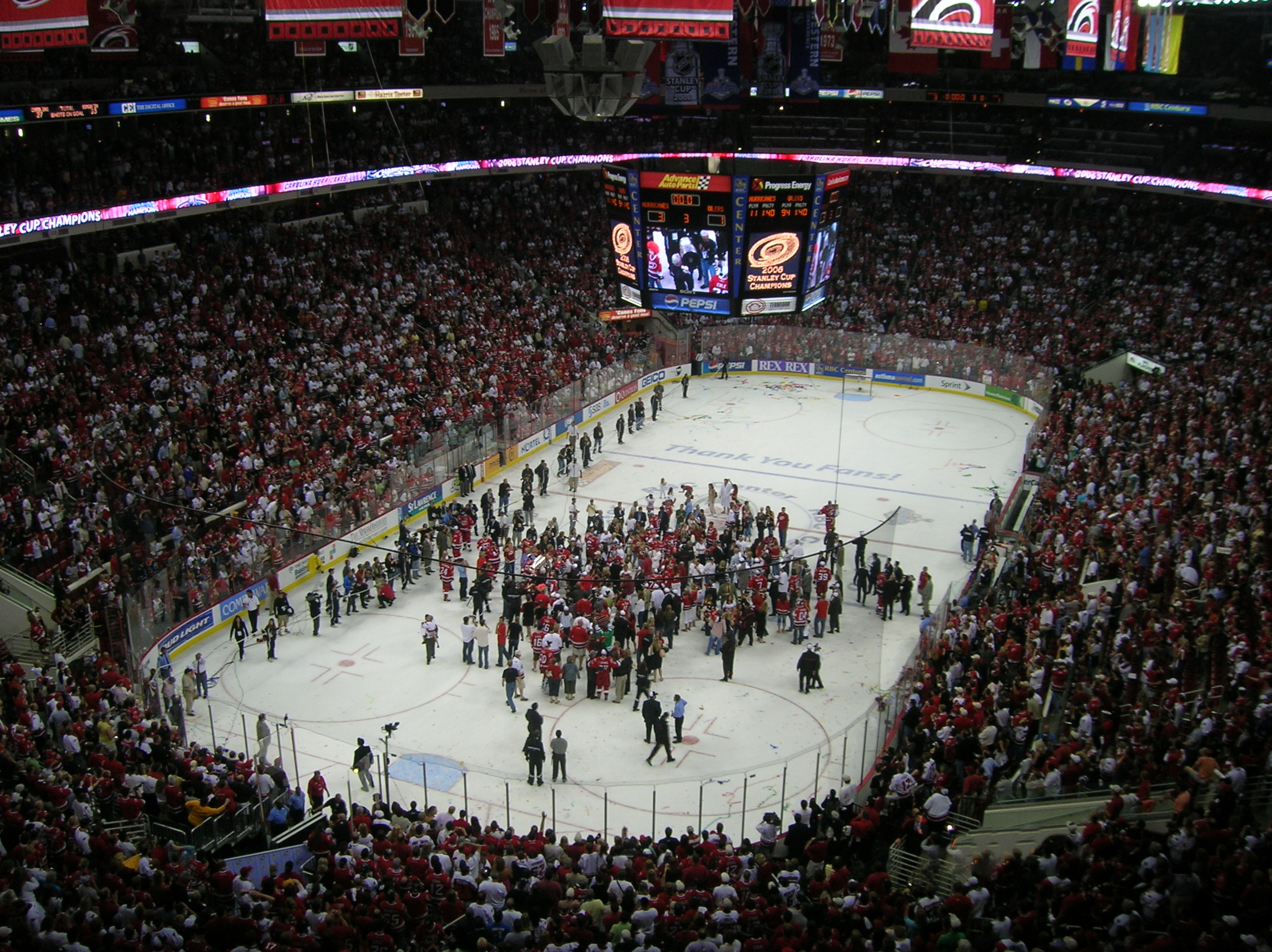
Carolina Hurricanes Stanley Cup awards ceremony at the RBC Center (now Lenovo Center) in Raleigh

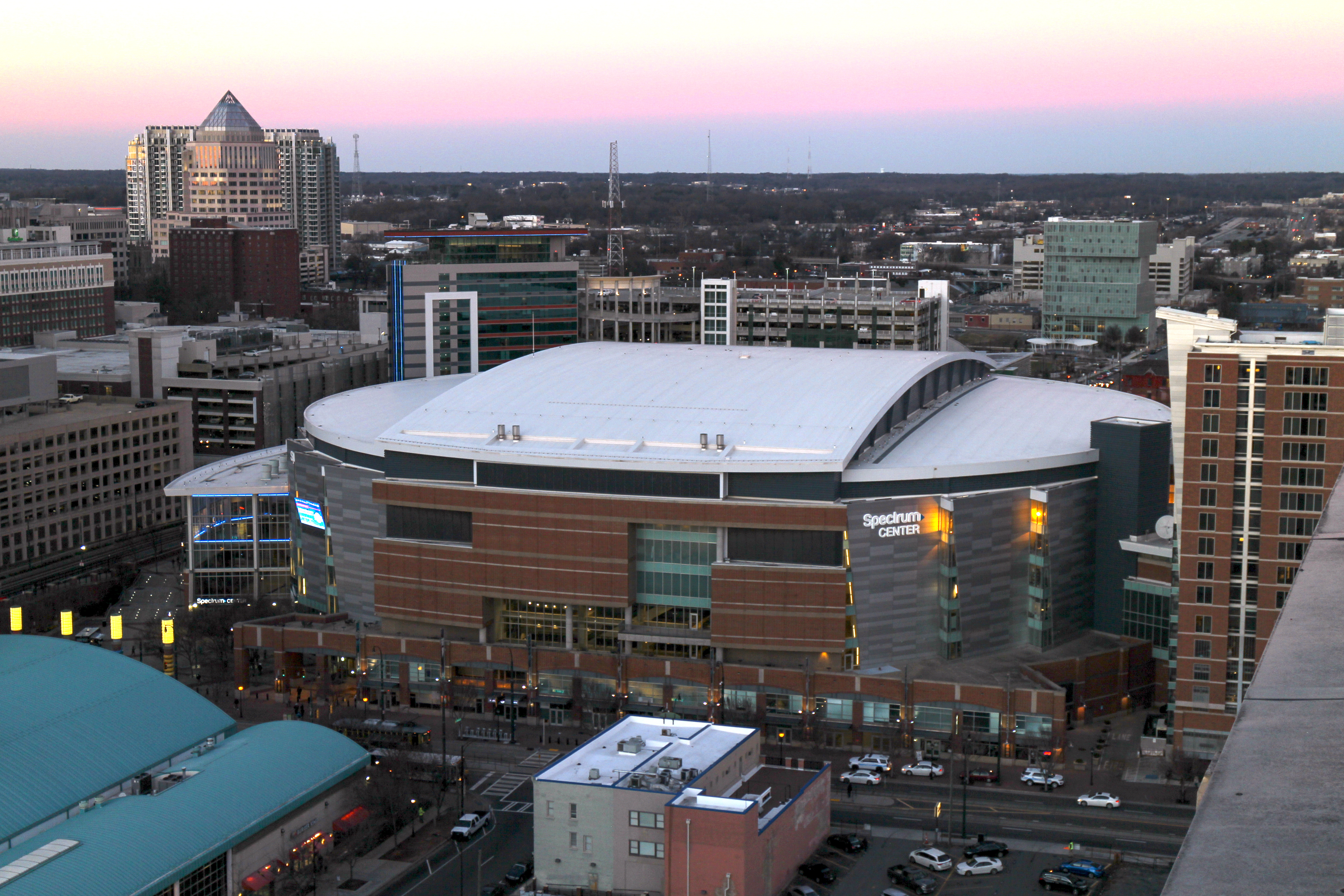
The Spectrum Center, home arena of the NBA's Charlotte Hornets

North Carolina is home to four major league sports franchises: the Carolina Panthers of the National Football League, the Charlotte Hornets of the National Basketball Association, and Charlotte FC of Major League Soccer are based in Charlotte, while the Raleigh-based Carolina Hurricanes play in the National Hockey League. The Panthers and Hurricanes are the only two major professional sports teams that have the same geographical designation while playing in different metropolitan areas. The Hurricanes are the only major professional team from North Carolina to have won a league championship, having captured the Stanley Cup in 2006 and 2026. North Carolina is also home to two other top-level professional teams—the Charlotte Hounds of Major League Lacrosse and the North Carolina Courage of the National Women's Soccer League.

While North Carolina has no Major League Baseball team, it does have numerous Minor League Baseball teams, with the highest level of play coming from the Triple-A Charlotte Knights and Durham Bulls. Additionally, North Carolina has minor league teams in other team sports including soccer and ice hockey, most notably North Carolina FC and the Charlotte Checkers, both of which play in the second tier of their respective sports.

In addition to professional team sports, North Carolina has a strong affiliation with NASCAR and stock-car racing, with Charlotte Motor Speedway in Concord hosting races every year. Charlotte also hosts the NASCAR Hall of Fame, while Concord is the home of several top-flight racing teams, including Hendrick Motorsports, RFK Racing, and Haas Factory Team. Numerous other tracks around North Carolina host races from other racing circuits as well.

Golf is a popular summertime leisure activity, and North Carolina has hosted several important professional golf tournaments. Pinehurst Resort in Pinehurst has hosted a PGA Championship, Ryder Cup, two U.S. Opens, and one U.S. Women's Open. The Wells Fargo Championship is a regular stop on the PGA Tour and is held at Quail Hollow Club in Charlotte, and Quail Hollow has also played host to the PGA Championship. The Wyndham Championship is played annually in Greensboro at Sedgefield Country Club.

College sports are also popular in North Carolina, with 18 schools competing at the Division I level. The Atlantic Coast Conference (ACC) is headquartered in Greensboro, and both the ACC Football Championship Game (Charlotte) and the ACC men's basketball tournament (Greensboro) were most recently held in North Carolina. Additionally, the city of Charlotte is home to the National Junior College Athletics Association's (NJCAA) headquarters. College basketball is very popular in North Carolina, buoyed by the Tobacco Road rivalries between ACC members North Carolina, Duke, North Carolina State, and Wake Forest. The ACC Championship Game and the Duke's Mayo Bowl are held annually in Charlotte's Bank of America Stadium, featuring teams from the ACC and the Southeastern Conference. Additionally, the state has hosted the NCAA Men's Basketball Final Four on two occasions, in Greensboro in 1974 and in Charlotte in 1994.

=== Oklahoma ===
The Oklahoma City Thunder of the National Basketball Association (NBA) is the state's only major league sports franchise. The state had a team in the Women's National Basketball Association, the Tulsa Shock, from 2010 through 2015, but the team relocated to Dallas–Fort Worth after that season and became the Dallas Wings.

Oklahoma has teams in several minor leagues, including Minor League Baseball at the Triple-A and Double-A levels (the Oklahoma City Comets and Tulsa Drillers, respectively), hockey's ECHL with the Tulsa Oilers, and a number of indoor football leagues. In the last-named sport, the state's most notable team was the Tulsa Talons, which played in the Arena Football League until 2012, when the team was moved to San Antonio, Texas. The Oklahoma Defenders replaced the Talons as Tulsa's only professional arena football team, playing the CPIFL. The Oklahoma City Blue, of the NBA G League, relocated to Oklahoma City from Tulsa in 2014, where they were formerly known as the Tulsa 66ers. Tulsa is the base for the Tulsa Revolution, which plays in the American Indoor Soccer League. Enid and Lawton host professional basketball teams in the USBL and the CBA.

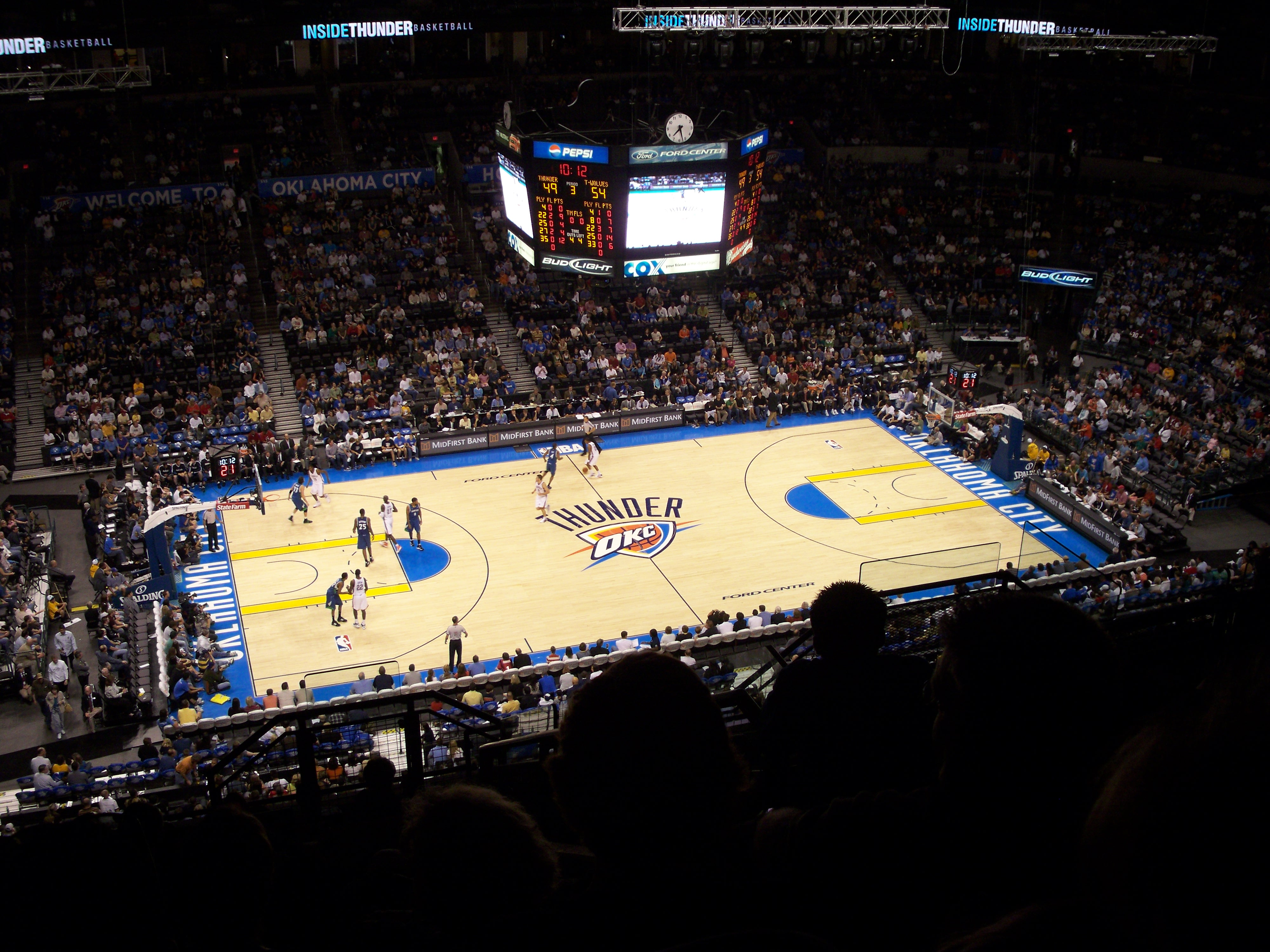
The Oklahoma City Thunder moved to Oklahoma City in 2008, becoming the state's first (and so far only) permanent major-league team in any sport.

Collegiate athletics are a popular draw in the state. The state has four schools that compete at the highest level of college sports, NCAA Division I. The Oklahoma Sooners participate in the Southeastern Conference, and the Oklahoma State Cowboys and Cowgirls participate in the Big 12 Conference. The Big 12 and SEC are two of the so-called Power Four conferences of the top tier of college football, Division I FBS. The Sooners and Cowboys average well over 50,000 fans attending their football games, and Oklahoma's football program ranked 12th in attendance among American colleges in 2010, with an average of 84,738 people attending its home games. The two universities meet several times each year in rivalry matches known as the Bedlam Series, which are some of the greatest sporting draws to the state. Sports Illustrated magazine rates Oklahoma and Oklahoma State among the top colleges for athletics in the nation.

Two private institutions in Tulsa, the University of Tulsa and Oral Roberts University; are also Division I members. Tulsa competes in FBS football and other sports in the American Athletic Conference, while Oral Roberts, which does not sponsor football, is a member of the Summit League. In addition, 12 of the state's smaller colleges and universities compete in NCAA Division II as members of three different conferences, and eight other Oklahoma institutions participate in the NAIA, mostly within the Sooner Athletic Conference.

Regular LPGA tournaments are held at Cedar Ridge Country Club in Tulsa, and major championships for the PGA or LPGA have been played at Southern Hills Country Club in Tulsa, Oak Tree Country Club in Oklahoma City, and Cedar Ridge Country Club in Tulsa. Rated one of the top golf courses in the nation, Southern Hills has hosted five PGA Championships, including one in 2022, and three U.S. Opens, the most recent in 2001. Rodeos are popular throughout the state, and Guymon, in the state's panhandle, hosts one of the largest in the nation.

ESPN called Oklahoma City "the center of the softball universe", specifically referring to the fast-pitch version, in a 2020 story. Oklahoma City is home to the governing body of the sport in the United States, USA Softball, which has its headquarters in a complex that also includes Devon Park. It annually hosts the Women's College World Series, the eight-team final round of the NCAA Division I softball tournament. Devon Park will host softball at the 2028 Summer Olympics, and the Riversport OKC complex will host canoe slalom at the Games.

College wrestling has strong tradition in Oklahoma. Oklahoma State has the most NCAA national championships of any collegiate team with 34, with the Oklahoma Sooners having 7 NCAA wrestling titles. The National Wrestling Hall of Fame and Museum is headquartered in Stillwater.

A teqball competition was held in Tulsa June 14–16, 2024.

=== South Carolina ===
Although no major league professional sports teams are based in South Carolina, the Carolina Panthers have training facilities in the state and played their inaugural season's home games at Clemson's Memorial Stadium in 1995. They now play at Bank of America Stadium in Charlotte, North Carolina. The Panthers consider themselves "The Carolinas' Team" and refrained from naming themselves after Charlotte or either of the Carolinas, as they represent both states. The Panthers prominently display the South Carolina state flag at the stadium with co-equal prominence to the North Carolina flag.

The highest level of professional sports in the state is in soccer with the Charleston Battery of the second-division USL Championship. Founded in 1993, the Battery also hold the designation as the oldest continuously operating professional soccer team in the United States, pre-dating Major League Soccer, too.

The state is also home to numerous minor league professional teams. College teams represent their particular South Carolina institutions, and are the primary options for football, basketball and baseball attendance in the state. South Carolina is also a top destination for golf and water sports.

South Carolina is also home to one of NASCAR's first tracks and its first paved speedway, Darlington Raceway, located northwest of Florence.

=== Tennessee ===
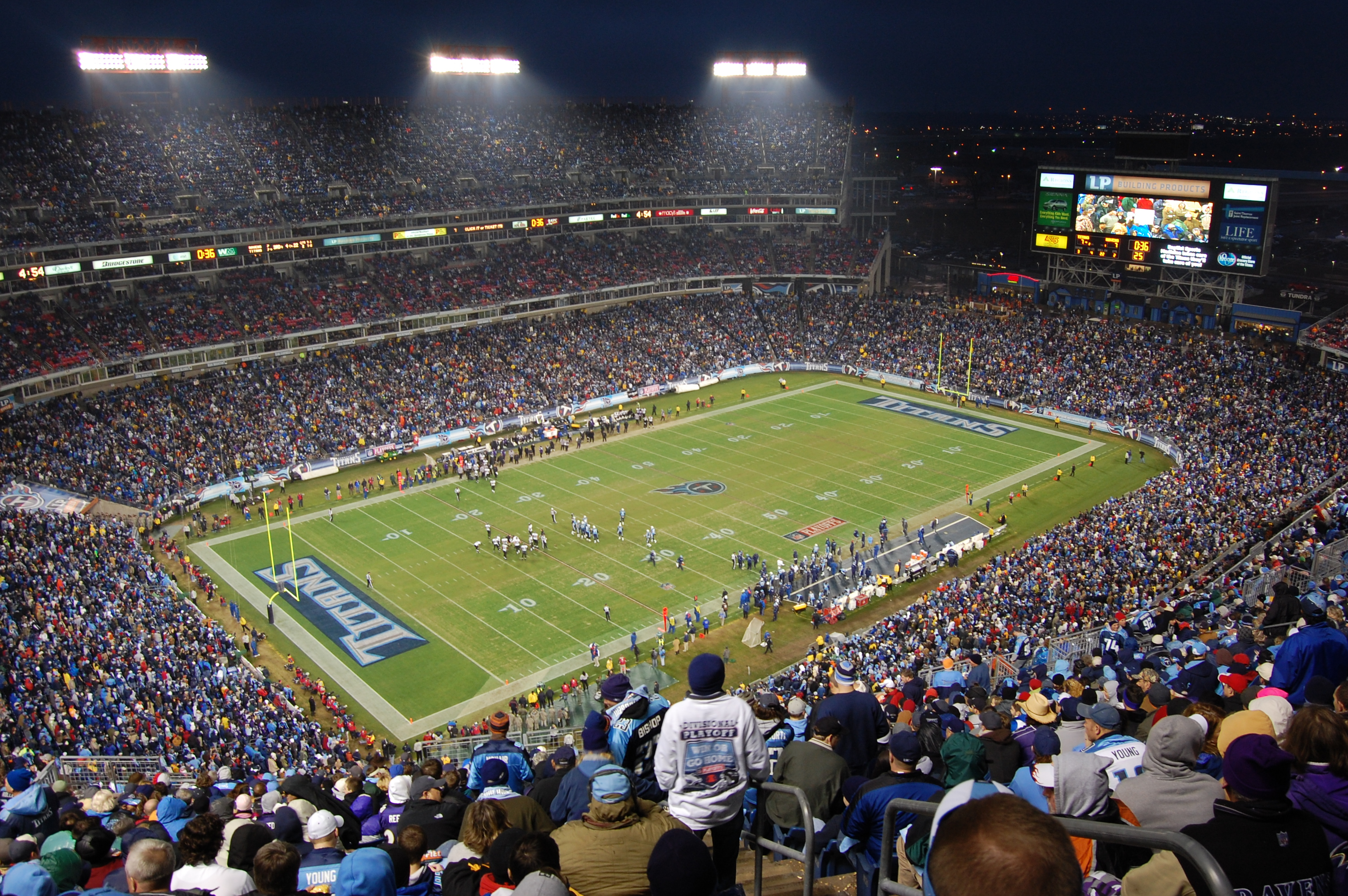
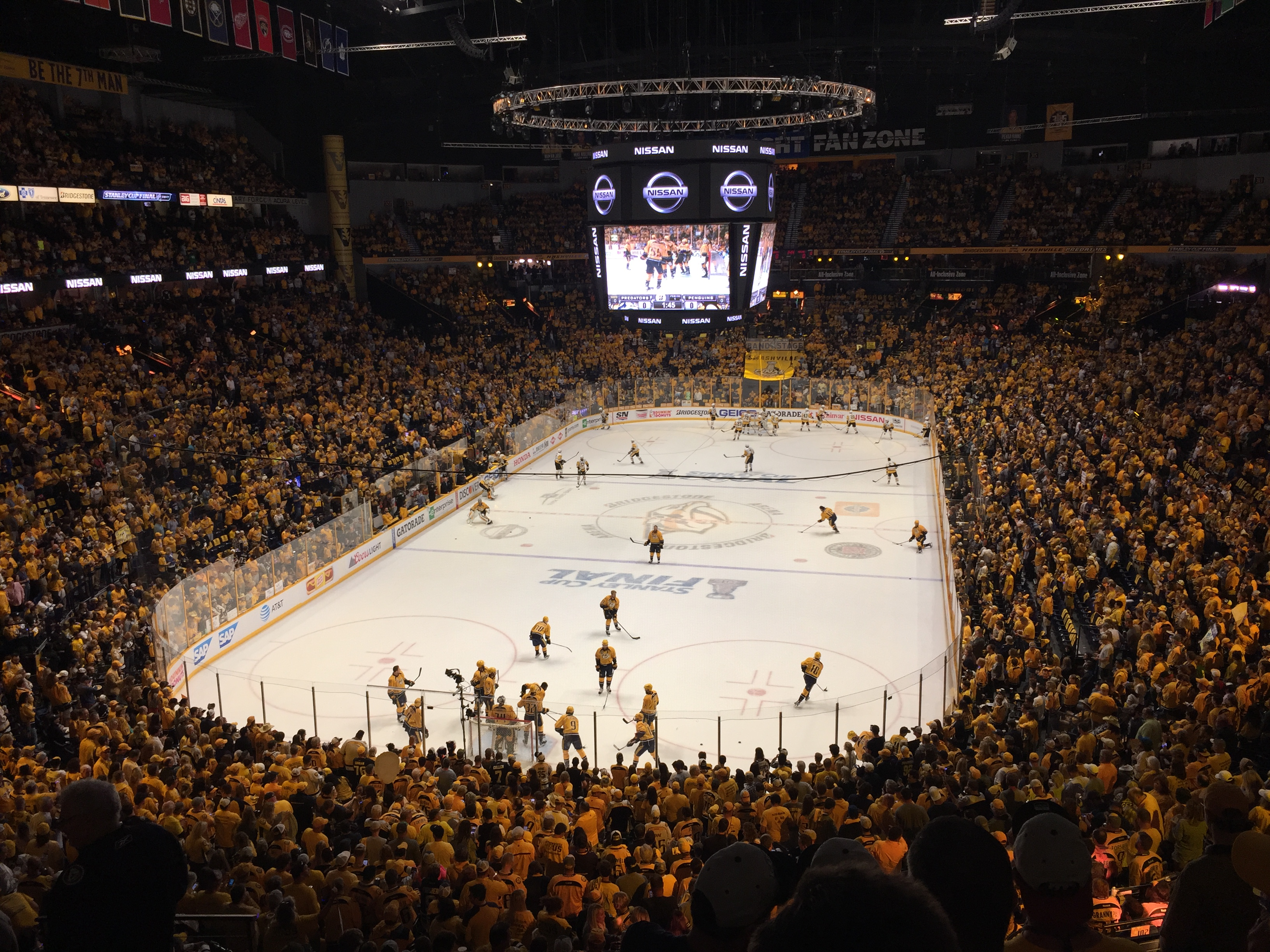
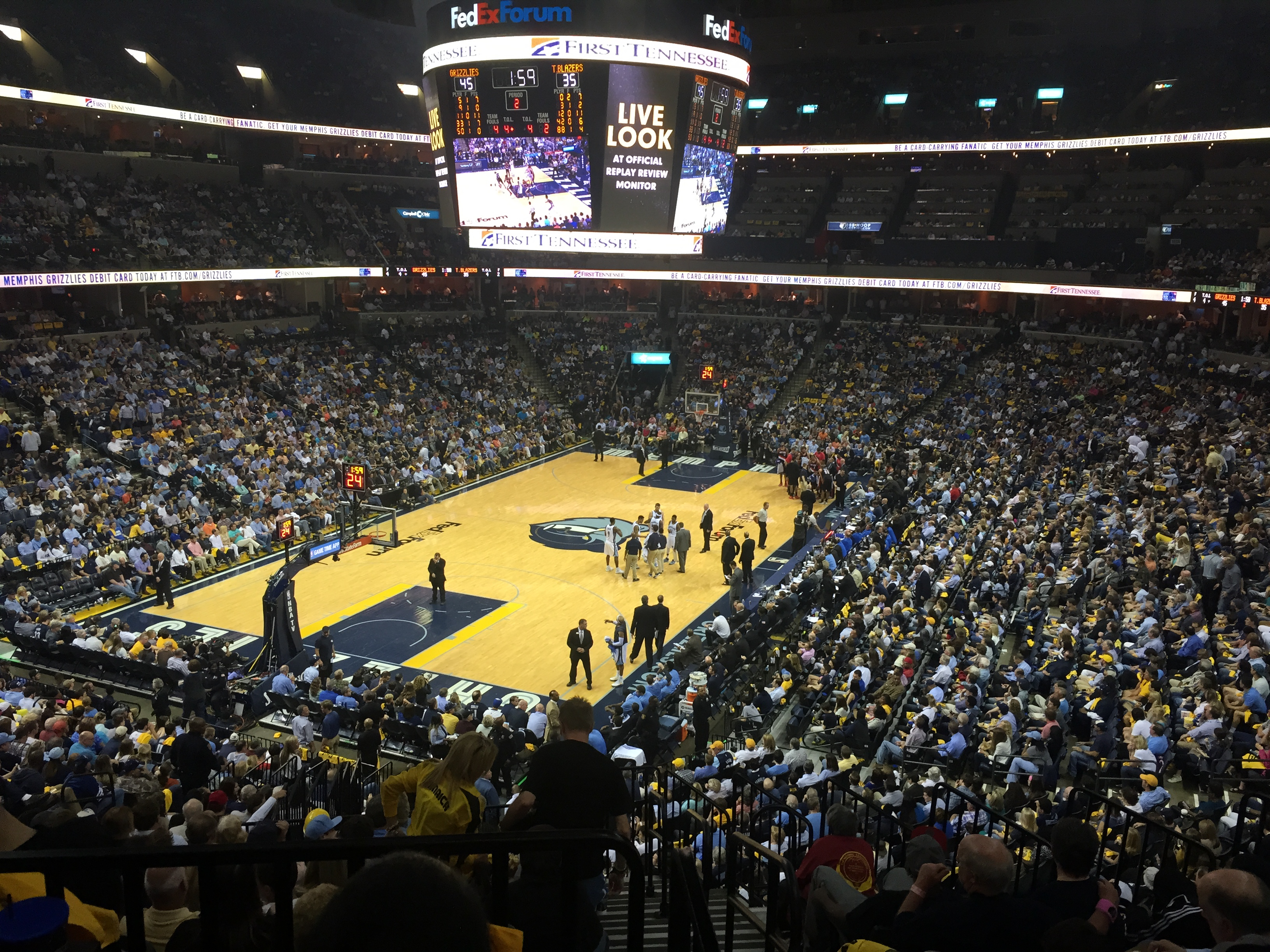
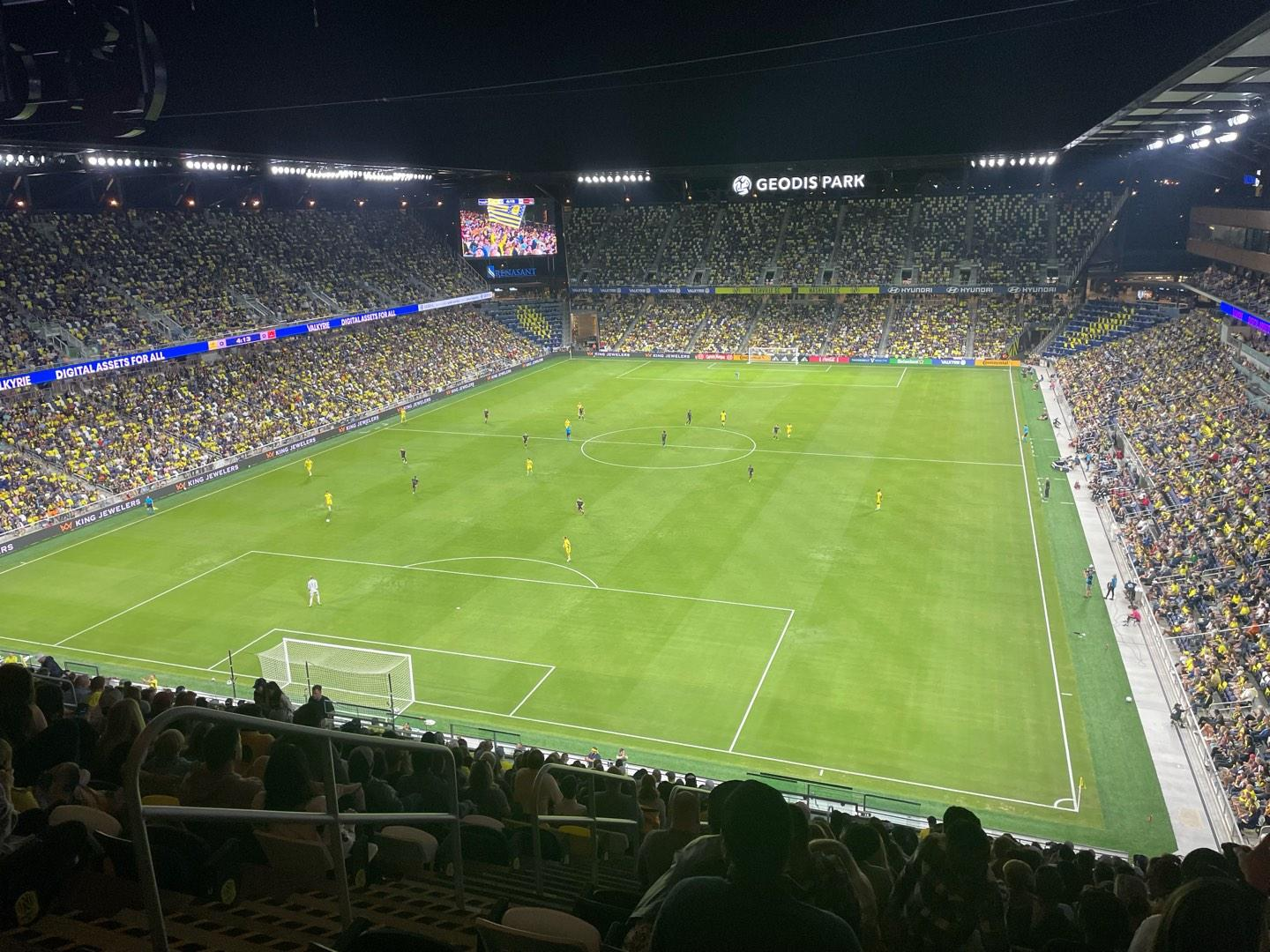
Tennessee's major professional sports franchises. Clockwise from upper left: Tennessee Titans, Nashville Predators, Nashville SC, and Memphis Grizzlies.

Tennessee is home to four major professional sports franchises: the Tennessee Titans have played in the National Football League (NFL) since 1997, the Nashville Predators have played in the National Hockey League (NHL) since 1998, the Memphis Grizzlies have played in the National Basketball Association (NBA) since 2001, and Nashville SC has played in Major League Soccer (MLS) since 2020.

The state is also home to eight minor league teams. Four of these are Minor League Baseball clubs. The Nashville Sounds, which began play in 1978, and Memphis Redbirds, which began in 1998, each compete in the International League at the Triple-A level, the highest before Major League Baseball. The Knoxville Smokies, which have played continuously since 1972, and Chattanooga Lookouts, which have played continuously since 1976, are members of the Double-A classification Southern League.

Tennessee has three minor league soccer teams. Chattanooga Red Wolves SC has been a member of the third-tier USL League One since 2019. One Knoxville SC, founded in 2021, are also members of USL League One since 2023. Founded in 2009, Chattanooga FC began playing in the third-tier MLS Next Pro in 2024. The state also has one minor league ice hockey team: the Knoxville Ice Bears, which began play in 2002 and are members of the Southern Professional Hockey League.

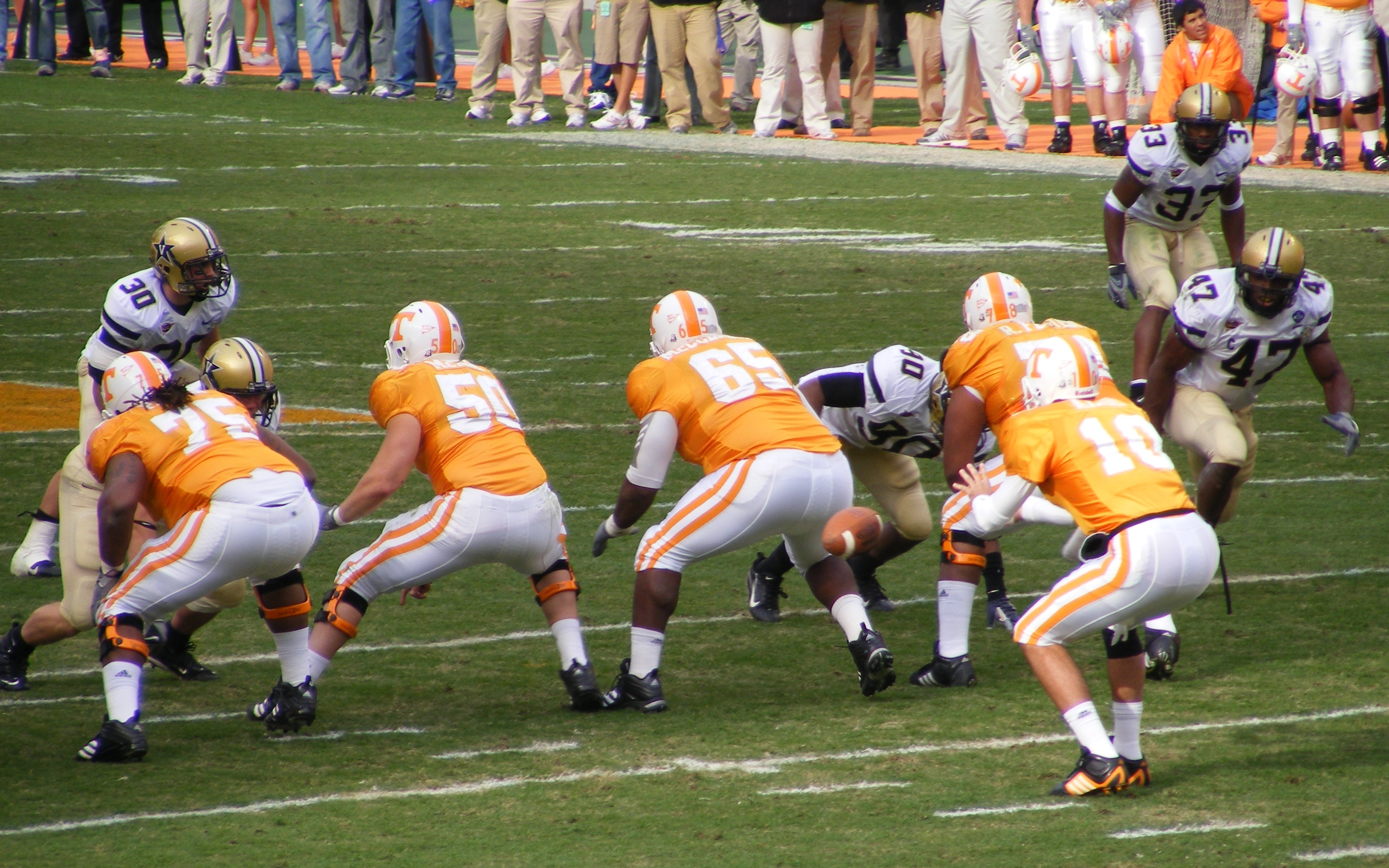
Tennessee Volunteers football

The state is home to 12 NCAA Division I programs. Four of these participate in the top level of college football, the Football Bowl Subdivision. In Knoxville, the Tennessee Volunteers college teams play in the Southeastern Conference (SEC) of the National Collegiate Athletic Association (NCAA). In Nashville, the Vanderbilt Commodores are also members of the SEC. The Memphis Tigers are members of the American Athletic Conference, and Murfreesboro's Middle Tennessee Blue Raiders play in Conference USA. Nashville is also home to the Belmont Bruins, members of the Ohio Valley Conference (OVC) but moving to the Missouri Valley Conference (MVC) in July 2022; Tennessee State Tigers, OVC members with no plans to change conferences; and the Lipscomb Bisons, members of the ASUN Conference. Tennessee State plays football in Division I's second level, the Football Championship Subdivision, while Belmont and Lipscomb do not have football teams. Through the 2021–22 school year, the OVC also includes the Austin Peay Governors from Clarksville, the UT Martin Skyhawks from Martin, and the Tennessee Tech Golden Eagles from Cookeville. UT Martin and Tennessee Tech will remain in the OVC, while Peay will move to the ASUN. The Chattanooga Mocs and Johnson City's East Tennessee State Buccaneers are full members, including football, of the Southern Conference.

Tennessee is also home to the Bristol Motor Speedway, which features NASCAR Cup Series racing two weekends a year, routinely selling out more than 160,000 seats on each date. The Nashville Superspeedway in Lebanon, which previously held Nationwide and IndyCar races until it was shut down in 2011, reopened to host the NASCAR Cup Series in 2021. Tennessee's only graded stakes horserace, the Iroquois Steeplechase, is held in Nashville each May. The WGC Invitational is a PGA Tour golf tournament that has been held in Memphis since 1958.

=== Texas ===
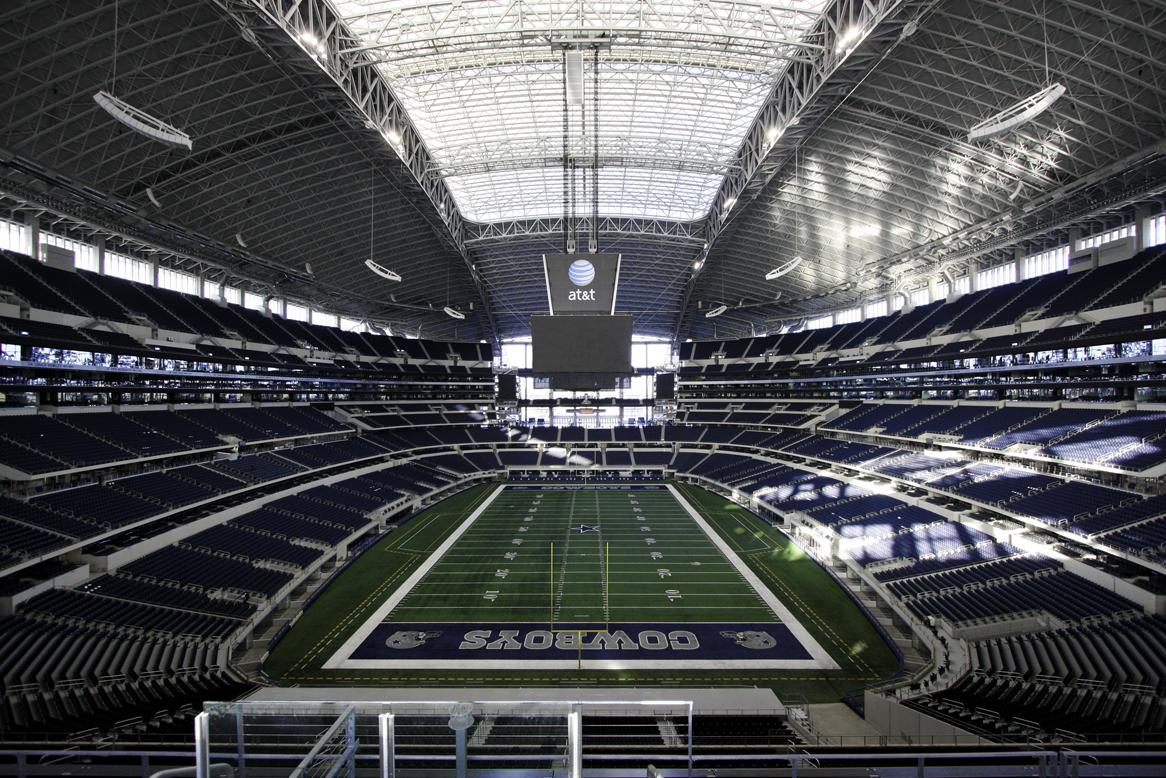
AT&T Stadium, home of the Dallas Cowboys, who are commonly known as America's Team

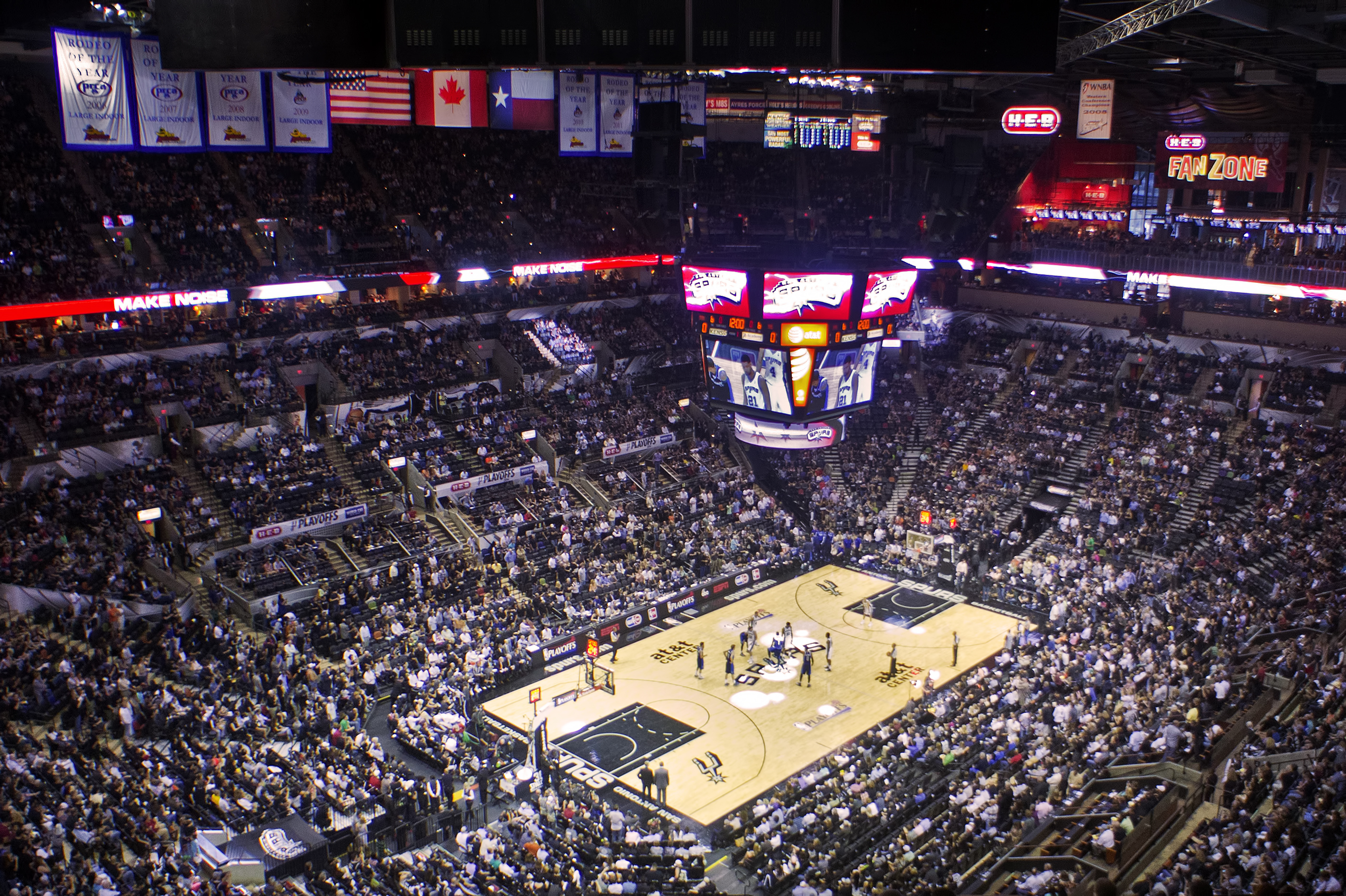
Playoff game between the San Antonio Spurs and the Dallas Mavericks in 2014; the Spurs won the NBA Finals that year.

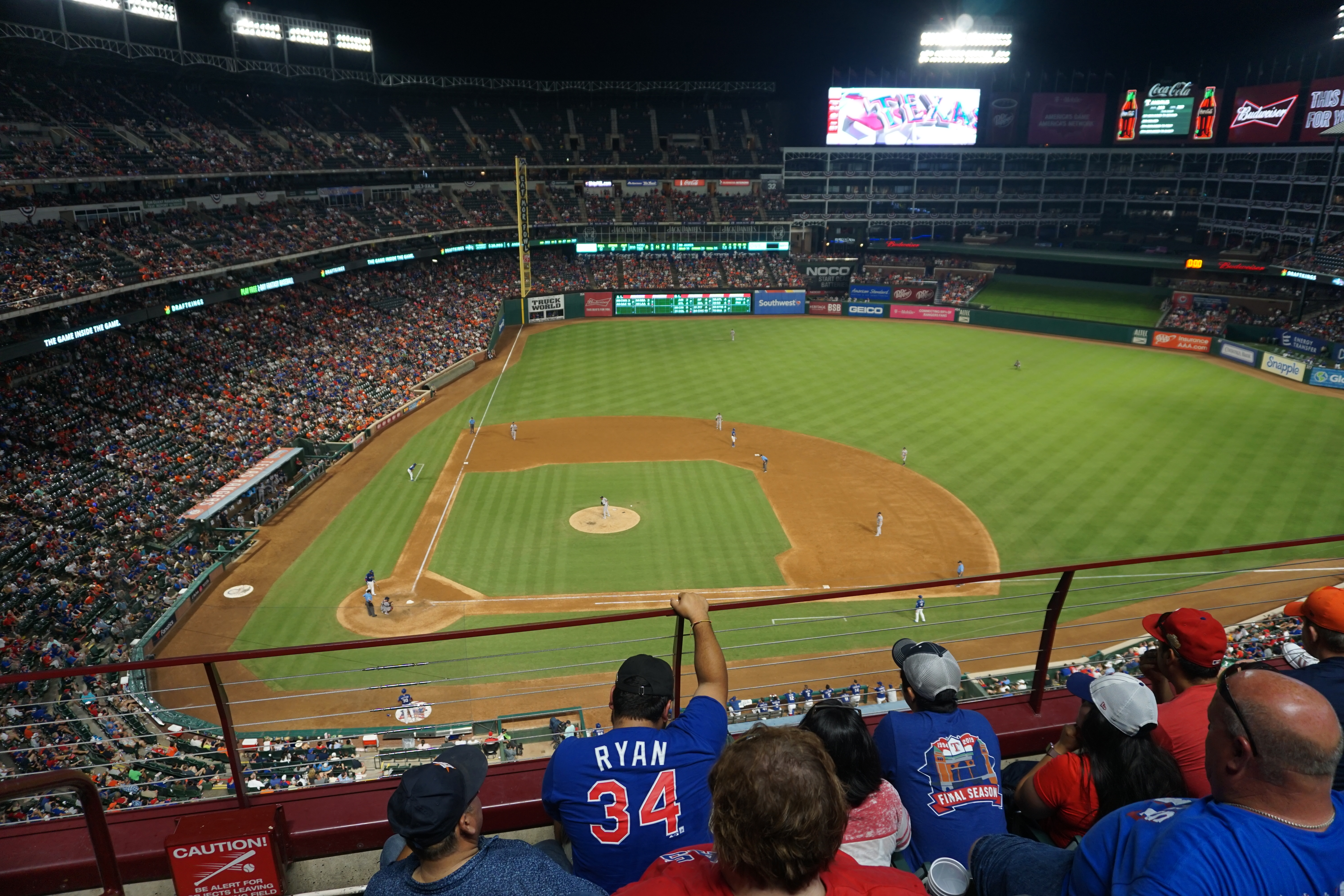
Texan baseball fans attending a game between the state's two MLB teams (Texas Rangers and Houston Astros) at Globe Life Field in Arlington

Within the "Big Four" professional leagues, Texas has two NFL teams (the Dallas Cowboys and the Houston Texans), two MLB teams (the Houston Astros and the Texas Rangers), three NBA teams (the San Antonio Spurs, the Houston Rockets, and the Dallas Mavericks), and one NHL team (the Dallas Stars). The Dallas–Fort Worth metroplex is one of only twelve American metropolitan areas that host sports teams from all the "Big Four" professional leagues. Outside of the "Big Four", Texas also has a WNBA team (the Dallas Wings), three Major League Soccer teams (Austin FC, Houston Dynamo FC and FC Dallas), and one NWSL team (the Houston Dash).

Collegiate athletics have deep significance in Texas culture, especially football. The state has twelve Division I-FBS schools, the most in the nation. Four of the state's schools claim at least one national championship in football: the Texas Longhorns, the Texas A&M Aggies, the TCU Horned Frogs, and the SMU Mustangs. According to a survey of Division I-A coaches, the rivalry between the University of Oklahoma and the University of Texas at Austin, the Red River Shootout, ranks the third-best in the nation. The TCU Horned Frogs and SMU Mustangs also share a rivalry and compete annually in the Battle for the Iron Skillet. A fierce rivalry, the Lone Star Showdown, also exists between the state's two largest universities, Texas A&M University and the University of Texas at Austin. The athletics portion of the Lone Star Showdown rivalry was paused between 2012, when Texas A&M left the Big 12 and joined the SEC, and 2024, when Texas joined them.

The University Interscholastic League (UIL) organizes most primary and secondary school competitions. Events organized by UIL include contests in athletics (the most popular being high school football) as well as artistic and academic subjects.

Rodeo (the state sport) in Austin

Texans also enjoy rodeo. The world's first rodeo was hosted in Pecos, Texas. The annual Houston Livestock Show and Rodeo is the largest rodeo in the world. The Southwestern Exposition and Livestock Show in Fort Worth is the oldest continuously running rodeo incorporating many of the state's most historic traditions into its annual events. Dallas hosts the State Fair of Texas each year at Fair Park.

Texas Motor Speedway hosts annual NASCAR Cup Series and IndyCar Series auto races since 1997. Since 2012, Austin's Circuit of the Americas plays host to a round of the Formula 1 World Championship.

The Panther City Lacrosse Club is a professional lacrosse team in the National Lacrosse League. They have played local matches at Dickies Arena in Fort Worth, Texas since their inaugural 2021–2022 season.

=== Virginia ===
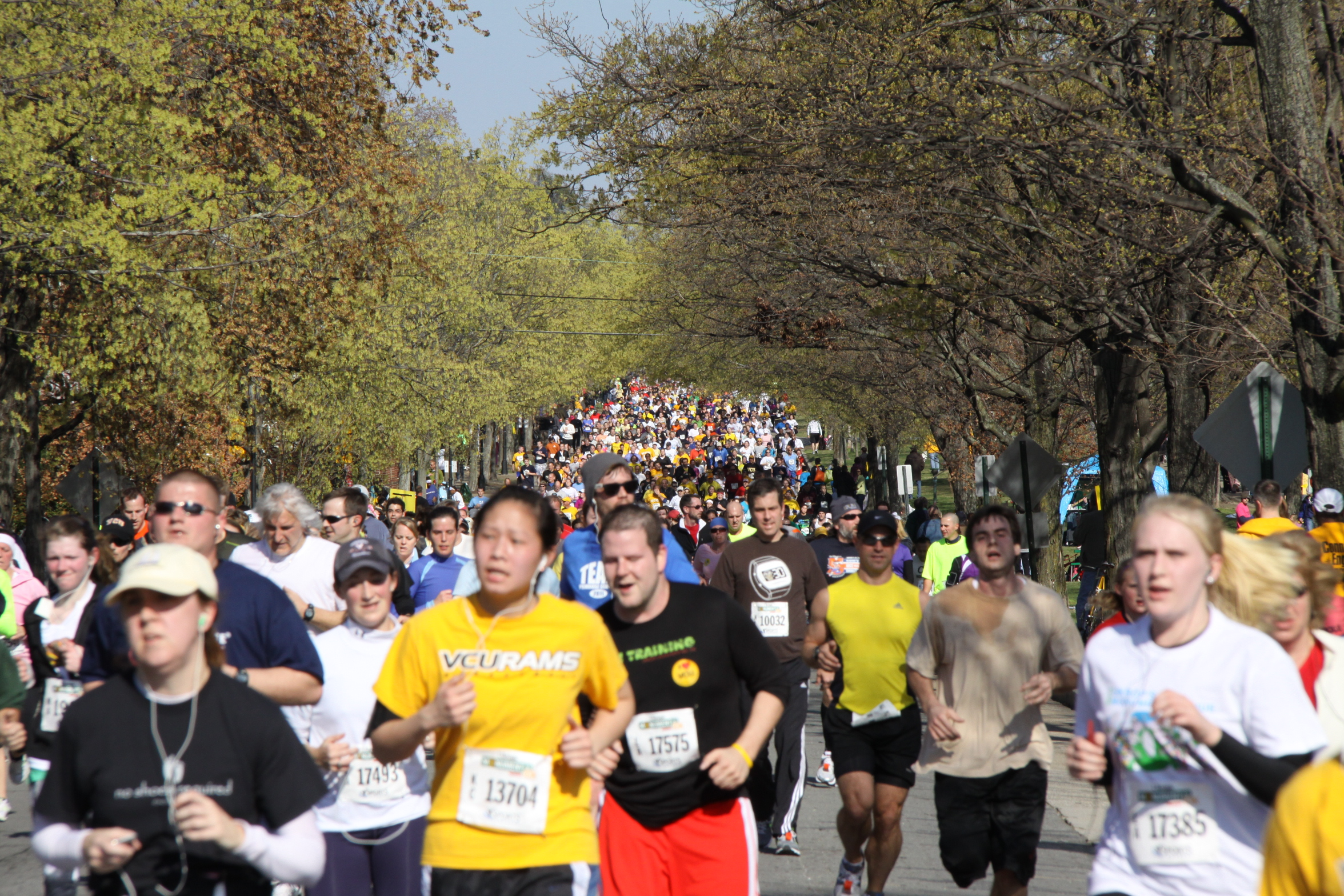
The annual Monument Avenue 10K in Richmond, one of the ten largest timed long-distance running races in the U.S.

Virginia is the most populous U.S. state without a major professional sports league franchise. The reasons for this include the lack of any dominant city or market within the state and the proximity of teams in Washington, D.C., Baltimore, Charlotte, and Raleigh, as well as a reluctance to publicly finance stadiums. A proposed $220 million NBA arena in Virginia Beach lost the support of the city council there in 2017, while a 2023 proposal to move the NBA's Washington Wizards and the NHL's Washington Capitals to Alexandria was canceled after opposition in the Virginia Senate.

Five minor league baseball and two mid-level hockey teams play in Virginia. Norfolk is host to two: The Triple-A Norfolk Tides and the ECHL's Norfolk Admirals. The Double-A Richmond Flying Squirrels began playing at The Diamond in 2010, while the Fredericksburg Nationals, Lynchburg Hillcats, and Salem RidgeYaks play in the Carolina League. Loudoun United FC, the reserve team of D.C. United, debuted in the USL Championship in 2019, while the Richmond Kickers of the USL League One have operated since 1993 and are the only team in their league to win both the league championship and the U.S. Open Cup in the same year. The training facilities for both the Washington Commanders and Washington Spirit are in Loudoun County, while the Washington Capitals practice at MedStar Capitals Iceplex in Ballston.

Hampton Roads has produced several Olympic gold medalists, including Gabby Douglas, the first African American to win gymnastics individual all-around gold, and LaShawn Merritt, Francena McCorory, and Michael Cherry, who have all won gold in the 4 × 400 meters relay. Noah Lyles, winner of the 100 meter dash at the 2024 Olympics, grew up in Alexandria. Major long-distance races in the state include the Richmond Marathon, the Blue Ridge Marathon on the Parkway, and the Monument Avenue 10K. Virginia's professional caliber golf courses include Kingsmill Resort outside Williamsburg, which hosts an LPGA Tour tournament in May, and the Country Club of Virginia outside Richmond, which hosts a charity classic on the PGA Tour Champions in October. Notable PGA Tour winners from Virginia include Sam Snead and Curtis Strange. NASCAR currently schedules Cup Series races on two tracks in Virginia: Martinsville Speedway and Richmond Raceway. Notable drivers from Virginia in the series have included Jeff Burton, Ward Burton, Denny Hamlin, Wendell Scott and Curtis Turner.

=== West Virginia ===
West Virginia is home to college sports teams from two schools—West Virginia and Marshall—that play in NCAA Division I. West Virginia is also home to several professional minor league baseball, football, hockey, and other sports teams.

Club	Sport	League
West Virginia Mountaineers	Football / Basketball	Big 12 Conference
Marshall Thundering Herd	Football / Basketball	Sun Belt Conference
Bluefield Ridge Runners	Baseball	Appalachian League
Charleston Dirty Birds	Baseball	Atlantic League of Professional Baseball
Tri-State Coal Cats	Baseball	Appalachian League
West Virginia Miners	Baseball	Prospect League
West Virginia Black Bears	Baseball	MLB Draft League
Wheeling Nailers	Ice hockey	ECHL
West Virginia Lightning	Football	Elite Mid-Continental Football League
West Virginia United	Soccer	USL League Two
West Virginia Bruisers	Football	Women's Football Alliance

== West ==
Professional sports leagues such as the National Football League (NFL), Major League Baseball (MLB), National Basketball Association (NBA), Women's National Basketball Association (WNBA), National Hockey League (NHL), Major League Soccer (MLS), and National Women's Soccer League (NWSL), have team franchises in following cities/metropolitan areas of the region:

- Denver: Avalanche (NHL), Broncos (NFL), Nuggets (NBA), Rapids (MLS), Rockies (MLB), Summit (NWSL)
- Phoenix metropolitan area: Cardinals (NFL), Diamondbacks (MLB), Mercury (WNBA), Suns (NBA)
- Las Vegas: Aces (WNBA), Golden Knights (NHL), Raiders (NFL)
- Los Angeles metropolitan area: Angel City (NWSL), Angels (MLB), Chargers (NFL), Clippers (NBA), Dodgers (MLB), Ducks (NHL) Los Angeles FC (MLS), Galaxy (MLS), Kings (NHL), Lakers (NBA), Rams (NFL), Sparks (WNBA)
- Portland: Trail Blazers (NBA), Thorns (NWSL), Timbers (MLS)
- Sacramento: Kings (NBA)
- Salt Lake City: Jazz (NBA), Royals (NWSL), Real (MLS), Mammoth (NHL)
- San Diego: Padres (MLB), San Diego FC (MLS), Wave (NWSL)
- San Francisco Bay Area: 49ers (NFL), Bay FC (NWSL), Earthquakes (MLS), Giants (MLB), Sharks (NHL), Valkyries (WNBA), Warriors (NBA)
- Seattle: Kraken (NHL), Mariners (MLB), Reign (NWSL), Seahawks (NFL), Sounders (MLS), Storm (WNBA)
- West Sacramento: Athletics (MLB) (the team will relocate to Las Vegas in 2027)

Since the 1970s, gay rodeo has been an important part of LGBTQ culture in Western states.

=== Alaska ===
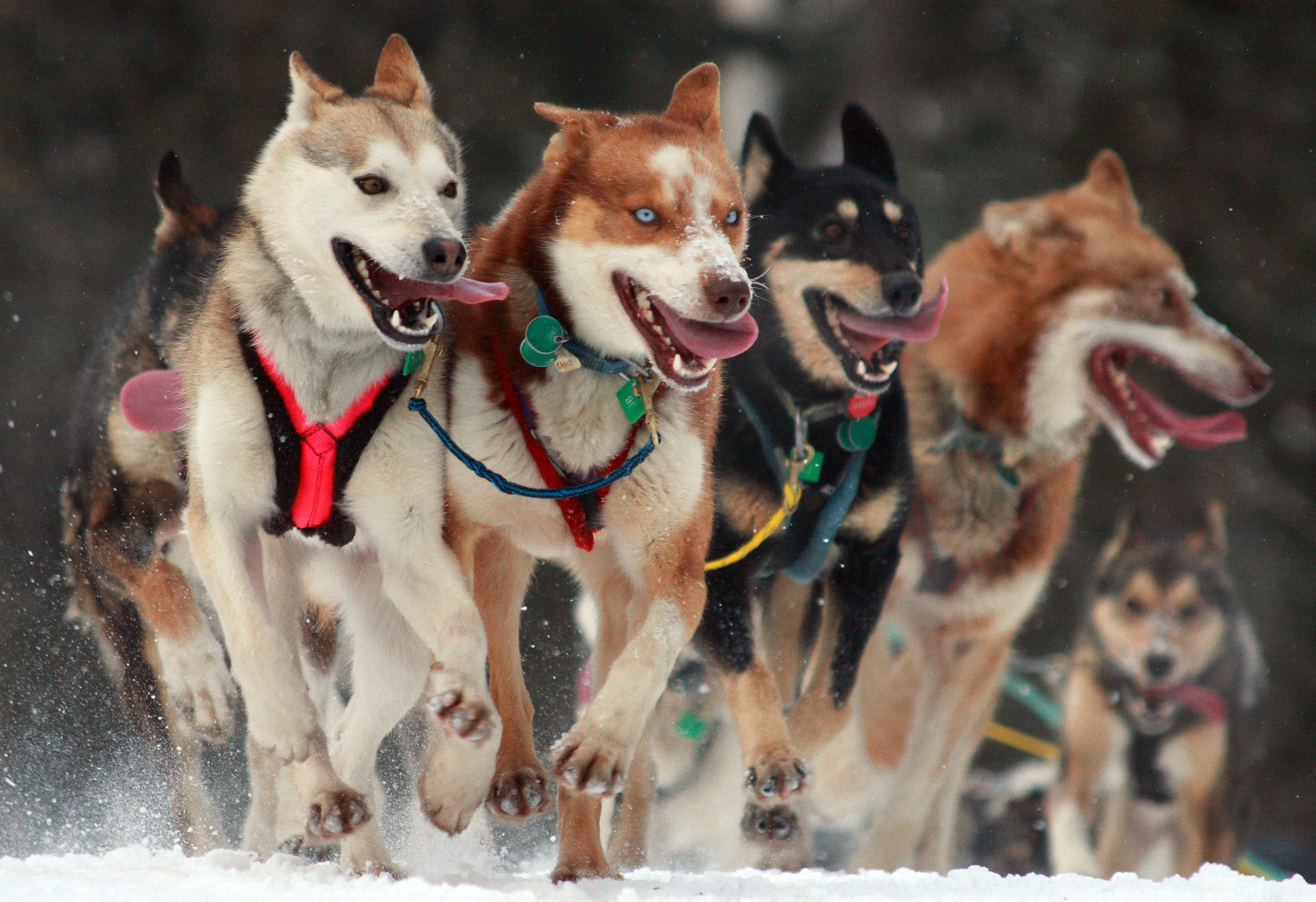
A dog team in the Iditarod Trail Sled Dog Race, arguably the most popular winter event in Alaska

The following is a list of sporting venues, events, and teams based in Alaska.

=== Arizona ===
Club	Sport	League	Championships
Arizona Cardinals	American football	National Football League	2 (1925, 1947)
Arizona Diamondbacks	Baseball	Major League Baseball	1 (2001)
Tucson Saguaros	Baseball	Pecos League	3 (2016, 2020, 2021)
Phoenix Suns	Basketball	National Basketball Association	0
Phoenix Mercury	Basketball	Women's National Basketball Association	3 (2007, 2009, 2014)
Phoenix Rising FC	Soccer	USL Championship	1 (2023)
FC Tucson	Soccer	USL League Two	0
Tucson Roadrunners	Ice hockey	American Hockey League	0
Arizona Rattlers	Indoor football	Indoor Football League	7 (1994, 1997, 2012, 2013, 2014)

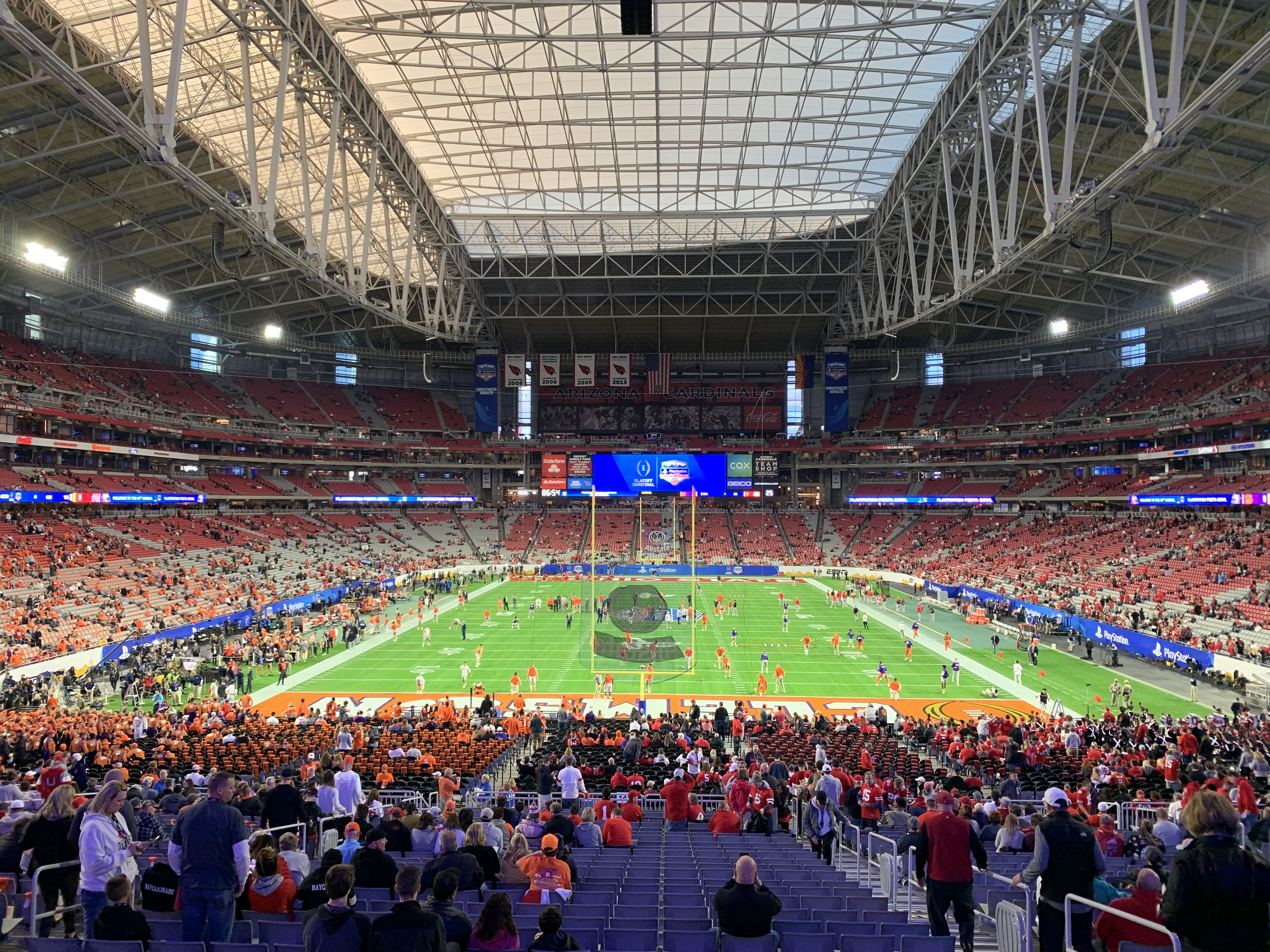
State Farm Stadium in Glendale

Four Super Bowls have been held in Arizona, including Super Bowl LVII which was held at State Farm Stadium on February 12, 2023.

Due to its numerous golf courses, Arizona is home to several stops on the PGA Tour, most notably the Phoenix Open, held at the TPC of Scottsdale, and the WGC-Accenture Match Play Championship at the Ritz-Carlton Golf Club in Marana.

Auto racing is another sport known in the state. Phoenix Raceway in Avondale is home to NASCAR race weekends twice a year. Firebird International Raceway near Chandler is home to drag racing and other motorsport events.

=== California ===
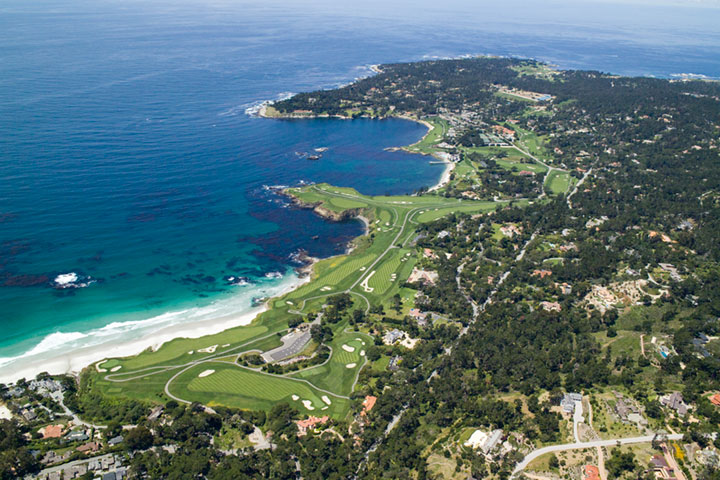
Pebble Beach Golf Links, one of the best ranked golf courses in the world

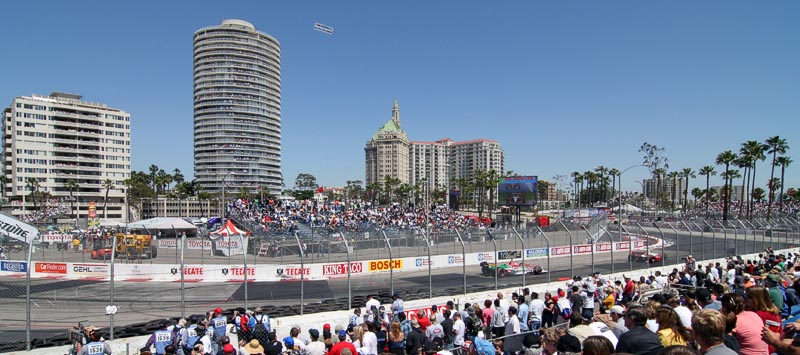
The Grand Prix of Long Beach is the longest running major street race in North America.

California has 19 major professional sports league franchises, far more than any other state. The San Francisco Bay Area has five major league teams, while the Greater Los Angeles Area is home to ten. San Diego has two major league teams and Sacramento has two. The NFL Super Bowl has been hosted in California 12 times at five different stadiums: Los Angeles Memorial Coliseum, the Rose Bowl, Stanford Stadium, Levi's Stadium, and San Diego Stadium. A thirteenth, Super Bowl LVI, was held at SoFi Stadium in Inglewood on February 13, 2022.

California has long had many respected collegiate sports programs. California is home to the oldest college bowl game, the annual Rose Bowl, among others.

The NFL has three teams in the state: the Los Angeles Rams, Los Angeles Chargers, and San Francisco 49ers.

MLB has five teams in the state: the San Francisco Giants, Los Angeles Dodgers, Los Angeles Angels, San Diego Padres, and the Athletics, which plan to move to Las Vegas by 2028.

The NBA has four teams in the state: the Golden State Warriors, Los Angeles Clippers, Los Angeles Lakers, and Sacramento Kings. Additionally, the WNBA also has two teams in the state: the Los Angeles Sparks and Golden State Valkyries.

The NHL has three teams in the state: the Anaheim Ducks, Los Angeles Kings, and San Jose Sharks.

MLS has four teams in the state: the Los Angeles Galaxy, San Jose Earthquakes, Los Angeles FC, and San Diego FC, while NWSL has three teams in California: Angel City FC, Bay FC, and San Diego Wave FC.

MLR has one team in the state: the San Diego Legion.

California is the only U.S. state to have hosted both the Summer and Winter Olympics. The 1932 and 1984 summer games were held in Los Angeles. Squaw Valley Ski Resort (now Palisades Tahoe) in the Lake Tahoe region hosted the 1960 Winter Olympics. Los Angeles will host the 2028 Summer Olympics, marking the fourth time that California will have hosted the Olympic Games.

Multiple games during the 1994 FIFA World Cup took place in California, with the Rose Bowl hosting eight matches (including the final), while Stanford Stadium hosted six matches.

SoFi Stadium in Los Angeles hosted eight matches during the 2026 World Cup, including five group stage fixtures, two Round of 32 clashes, and a Quarter-Final. Levi's Stadium in Santa Clara hosted six matches, including five group stage matches, and the Round of 32 match between the USMNT and Bosnia and Herzegovina.

In addition to the Olympic games, California also hosts the California State Games.

Many sports, such as surfing, snowboarding, and skateboarding, were invented in California, while others like volleyball, beach soccer, and skiing were popularized in the state.

Other sports that are big in the state include golf, rodeo, tennis, mountain climbing, marathon running, horse racing, bowling, mixed martial arts, boxing, and motorsports, especially NASCAR and Formula One.

Los Angeles Memorial Coliseum hosted the Summer Olympics in 1932 and 1984, and will also host in 2028.

Team	Sport	League
Los Angeles Rams	American football	National Football League (NFL)
Los Angeles Chargers	American football	National Football League
San Francisco 49ers	American football	National Football League
Los Angeles Dodgers	Baseball	Major League Baseball (MLB)
Los Angeles Angels	Baseball	Major League Baseball
San Diego Padres	Baseball	Major League Baseball
San Francisco Giants	Baseball	Major League Baseball
Golden State Warriors	Basketball	National Basketball Association (NBA)
Los Angeles Clippers	Basketball	National Basketball Association
Los Angeles Lakers	Basketball	National Basketball Association
Sacramento Kings	Basketball	National Basketball Association
Golden State Valkyries	Basketball	Women's National Basketball Association (WNBA)
Los Angeles Sparks	Basketball	Women's National Basketball Association
Anaheim Ducks	Ice hockey	National Hockey League (NHL)
Los Angeles Kings	Ice hockey	National Hockey League
San Jose Sharks	Ice hockey	National Hockey League
Los Angeles Galaxy	Soccer	Major League Soccer (MLS)
San Jose Earthquakes	Soccer	Major League Soccer
Los Angeles FC	Soccer	Major League Soccer
San Diego FC	Soccer	Major League Soccer
Angel City FC	Soccer	National Women's Soccer League (NWSL)
San Diego Wave FC	Soccer	National Women's Soccer League
San Diego Legion	Rugby union	Major League Rugby

=== Colorado ===
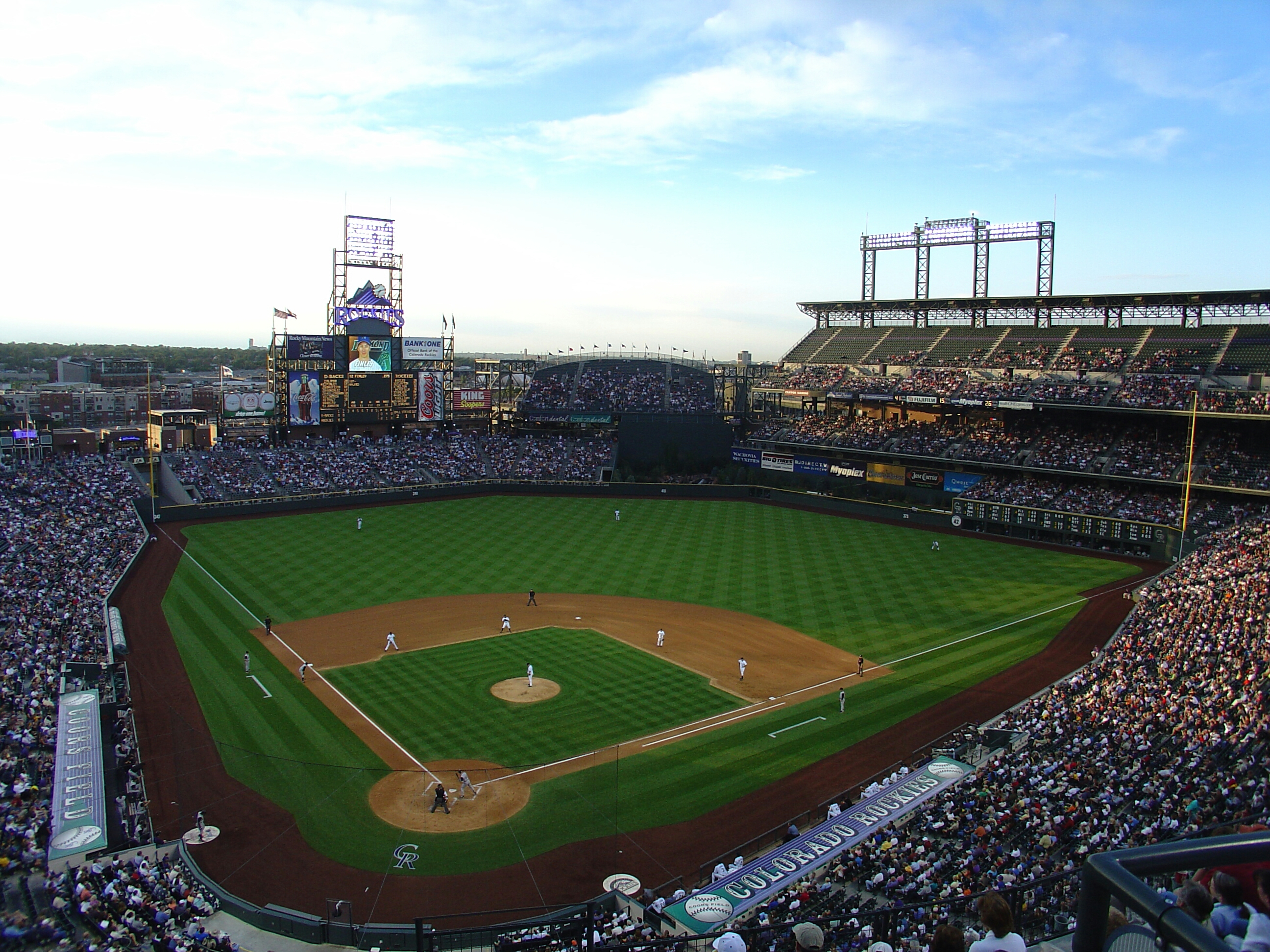
The Colorado Rockies baseball club at Coors Field

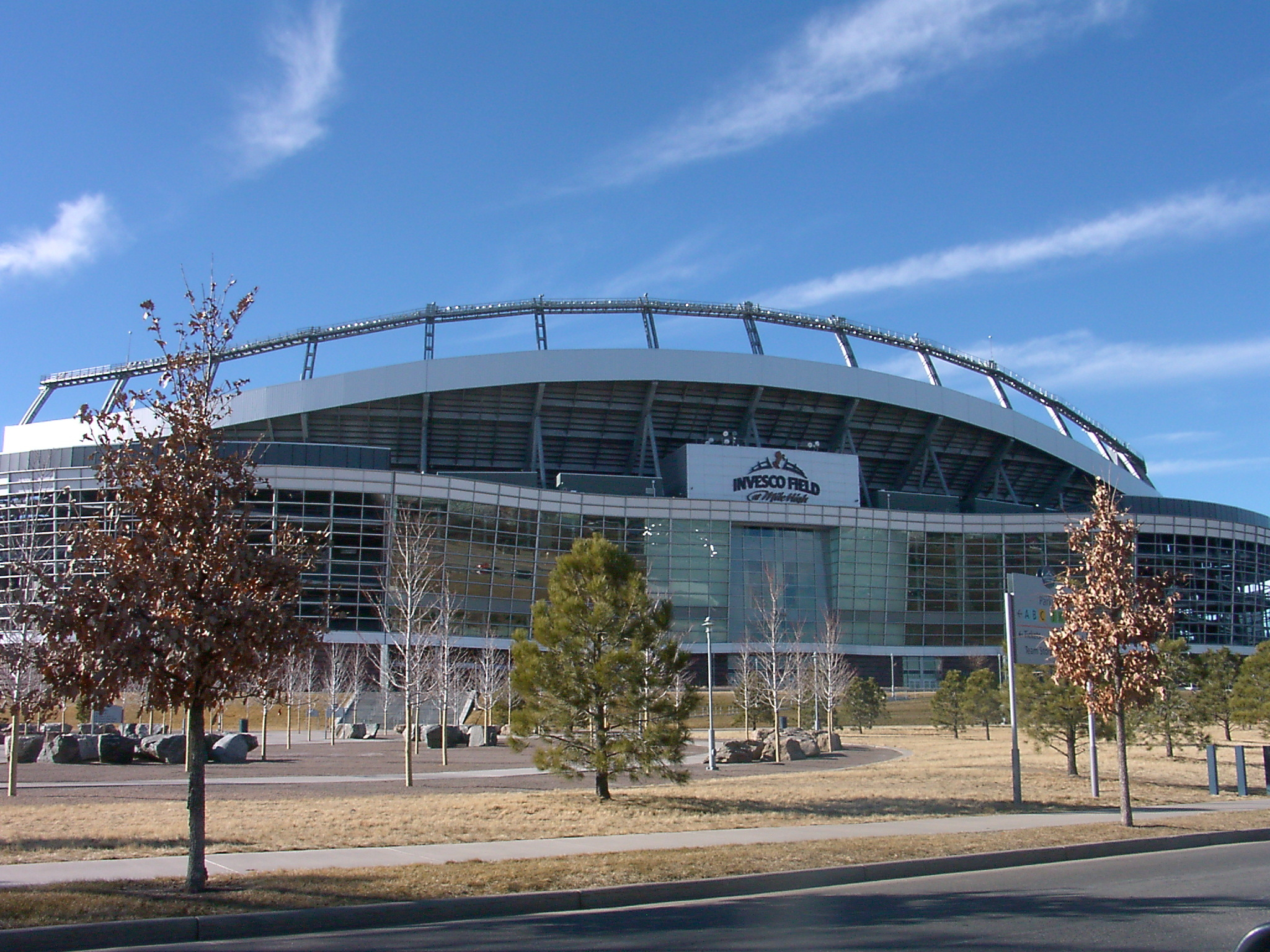
Empower Field at Mile High in Denver, home field of the Denver Broncos and the Denver Outlaws

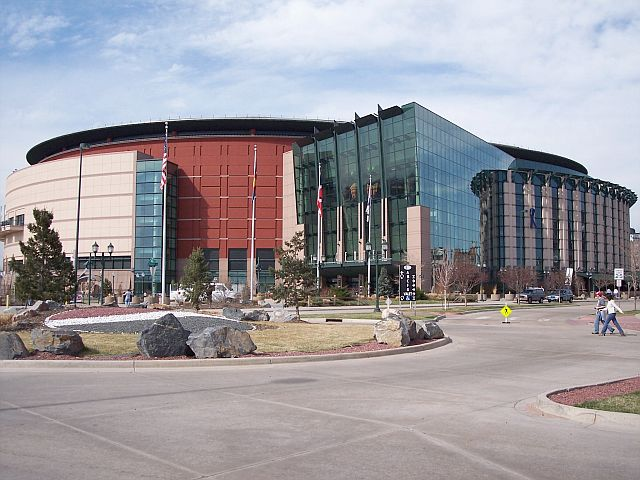
Ball Arena, home of the Denver Nuggets, the Colorado Avalanche, and the Colorado Mammoth

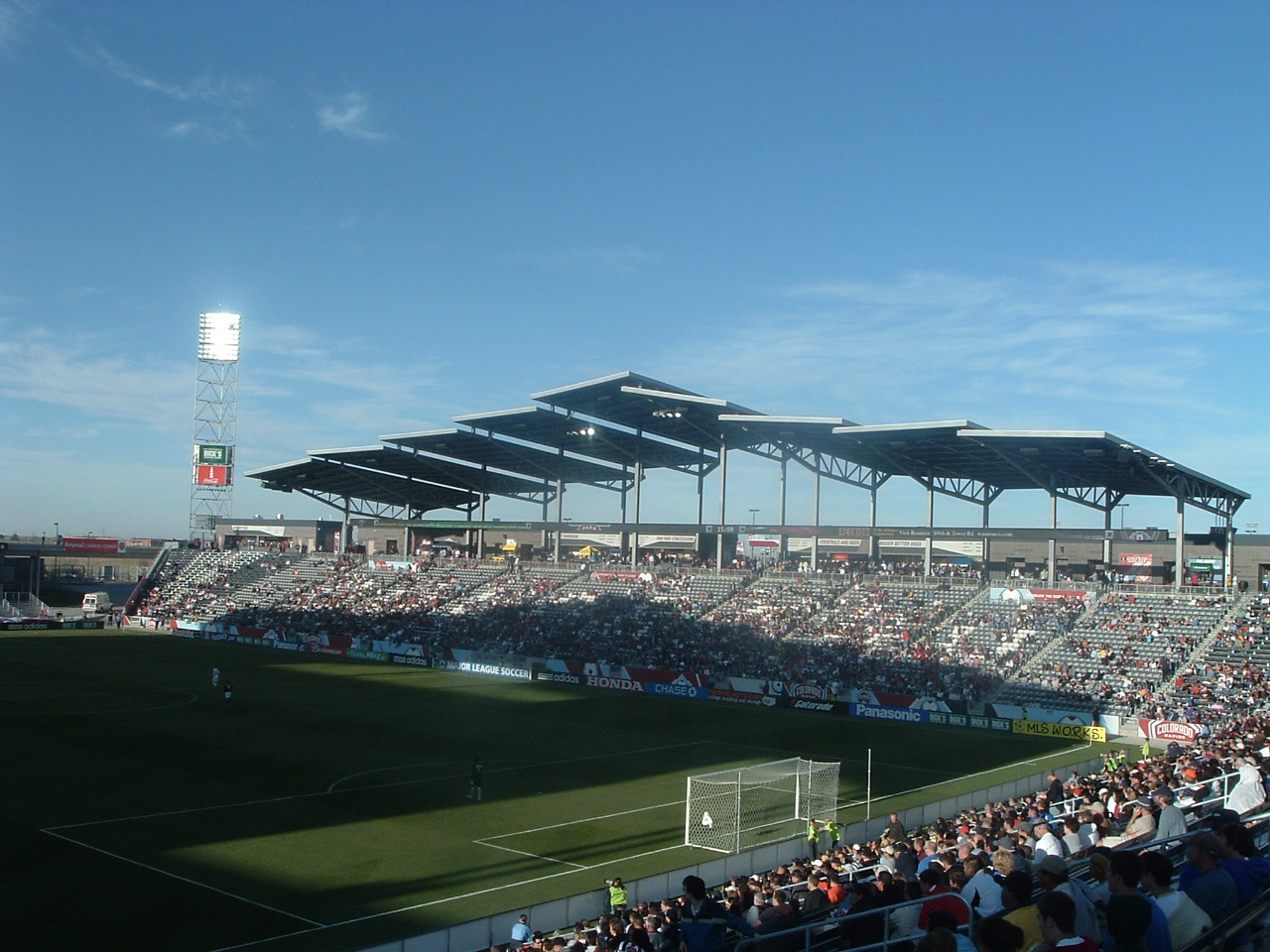
Dick's Sporting Goods Park, home of the Colorado Rapids

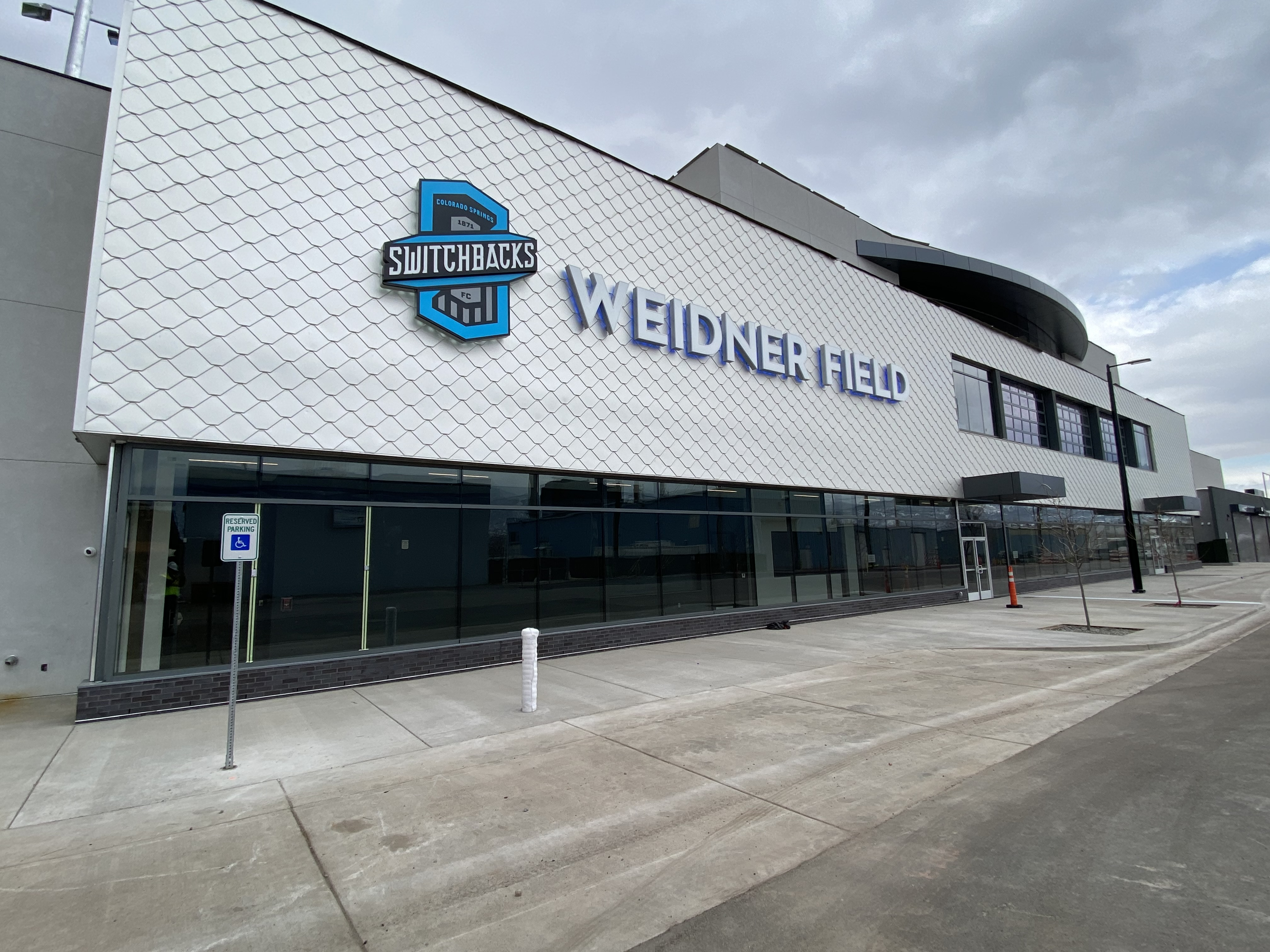
Weidner Field in Colorado Springs, home of the Colorado Springs Switchbacks FC

Colorado has five major professional sports leagues, all based in the Denver metropolitan area. Colorado is the least populous state with a franchise in each of the major professional sports leagues.

The Pikes Peak International Hill Climb is a major hill climbing motor race held on the Pikes Peak Highway.

The Cherry Hills Country Club has hosted several professional golf tournaments, including the U.S. Open, U.S. Senior Open, U.S. Women's Open, PGA Championship and BMW Championship.

=== Hawaii ===
Due to its distance from the continental United States, team sports in Hawaii are characterised by youth, collegial and amateur teams over professional teams, although some professional teams sports teams have at one time played in the state. Notable professional teams include The Hawaiians, which played at the World Football League in 1974 and 1975; the Hawaii Islanders, a Triple-A minor league baseball team that played at the Pacific Coast League from 1961 to 1987; and Team Hawaii, a North American Soccer League team that played in 1977.

Notable college sports events in Hawaii include the Maui Invitational Tournament, Diamond Head Classic (basketball) and Hawaii Bowl (football). The only NCAA Division I team in Hawaii is the Hawaii Rainbow Warriors and Rainbow Wahine, which competes at the Big West Conference (major sports), Mountain West Conference (football) and Mountain Pacific Sports Federation (minor sports). There are three teams in NCAA Division II: Chaminade Silverswords, Hawaii Pacific Sharks and Hawaii-Hilo Vulcans, all of which compete at the Pacific West Conference.

Surfing at North Shore of Oʻahu

Surfing has been a central part of Polynesian culture for centuries. Since the late 19th century, Hawaii has become a major site for surfists from around the world. Notable competitions include the Triple Crown of Surfing and The Eddie. Likewise, Hawaii has produced elite-level swimmers, including five-time Olympic medalist Duke Kahanamoku and Buster Crabbe, who set 16 swimming world records.

Hawaii has hosted the Sony Championship Hawaii golf tournament since 1965, the Lotte Championship golf tournament since 2012, the Tournament of Champions golf tournament from 1999 to 2025, the Honolulu Marathon since 1973, the Ironman World Championship triathlon race since 1978, the Ultraman triathlon since 1983, the National Football League's Pro Bowl from 1980 to 2016, the 2000 FINA World Open Water Swimming Championships, and the 2008 Pan-Pacific Championship and 2012 Hawaiian Islands Invitational soccer tournaments.

Hawaii has produced a number of notable Mixed Martial Arts fighters, such as former UFC Lightweight Champion and UFC Welterweight Champion B.J. Penn, and former UFC Featherweight Champion Max Holloway. Other notable Hawaiian Martial Artists include Travis Browne, K. J. Noons, Brad Tavares and Wesley Correira.

Hawaiians have found success in the world of sumo wrestling. Takamiyama Daigorō was the first foreigner to ever win a sumo title in Japan, while his protege Akebono Tarō became a top-level sumo wrestler in Japan during the 1990s before transitioning into a successful professional wrestling career in the 2000s. Akebono was the first foreign-born Sumo to reach Yokozuna in history and helped fuel a boom in interest in Sumo during his career.

=== Idaho ===
Central Idaho is home to one of North America's oldest ski resorts, Sun Valley, where the world's first chairlift was installed in 1936. Other noted outdoor sites include Hells Canyon, the Salmon River, and its embarkation point of Riggins.

Club	Sport	League
Boise Hawks	Baseball	Pioneer League
Boise State Broncos	NCAA	Div I FBS, MWC
Idaho Vandals	NCAA	Div I FCS, Big Sky
Idaho State Bengals	NCAA	Div I FCS, Big Sky
Idaho Falls Chukars	Baseball	Pioneer League
Idaho Steelheads	Ice hockey	ECHL
Idaho Horsemen	Indoor football	National Arena League
Idaho Falls Spud Kings	Ice hockey	USPHL
Athletic Club Boise	Soccer	USL League 1

The Boise Open professional golf tournament has been played at Hillcrest Country Club since 1990 as part of the Korn Ferry Tour. The Open has been part of the Korn Ferry Tour Finals since 2016.

High school sports are overseen by the Idaho High School Activities Association (IHSAA).

In 2016, Meridian's Michael Slagowski ran 800 meters in 1:48.70, one of the 35 fastest times ever run by a high school boy in the United States.

=== Montana ===
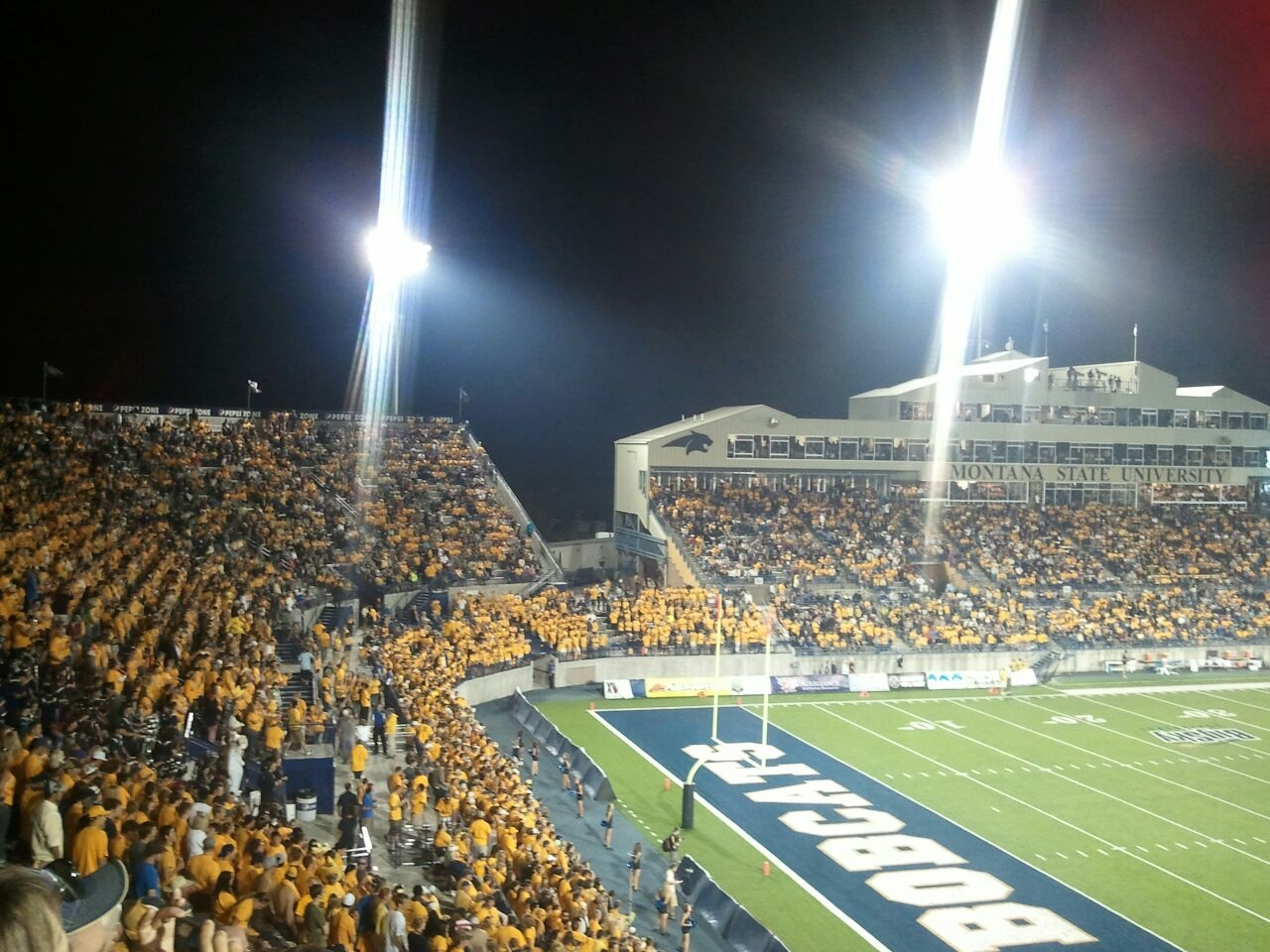
Montana State Bobcats football at Bobcat Stadium (Montana State University), Bozeman

==== Professional sports ====
There are no major league sports franchises in Montana due to the state's relatively small and dispersed population, but a number of minor league teams play in the state. Baseball is the minor-league sport with the longest heritage in the state and Montana is home to four independent teams, all members of the Pioneer League: the Billings Mustangs, Great Falls Voyagers, Missoula PaddleHeads and the Glacier Range Riders.

==== College sports ====
All of Montana's four-year colleges and universities field intercollegiate sports teams. The two largest schools, the University of Montana and Montana State University, are members of the Big Sky Conference and have enjoyed a strong athletic rivalry since the early twentieth century. Six of Montana's smaller four-year schools are members of the Frontier Conference. One is a member of the Great Northwest Athletic Conference.

==== Other sports ====
A variety of sports are offered at Montana high schools. Montana allows the smallest—"Class C"—high schools to utilize six-man football teams, dramatized in the independent 2002 film The Slaughter Rule.

There are four junior ice hockey teams in Montana, all of which are affiliated with the North American 3 Hockey League: the Bozeman Icedogs, Butte Irish, Great Falls Americans, and Helena Bighorns.

==== Olympic competitors ====
- Ski jumping champion and United States Skiing Hall of Fame inductee Casper Oimoen was captain of the U.S. Olympic team at the 1936 Winter Olympics while he was a resident of Montana. He placed thirteenth that year, and had previously finished fifth at the 1932 Winter Olympics.
- Montana has produced two U.S. champions and Olympic competitors in men's figure skating, both from Great Falls: John Misha Petkevich, lived and trained in Montana before entering college, competed in the 1968 and 1972 Winter Olympics. Scott Davis, also from Great Falls, competed at the 1994 Winter Olympics.
- Missoulian Tommy Moe won Olympic gold and silver medals at the 1994 Winter Olympics in downhill skiing and super G, the first American skier to win two medals at any Winter Olympics.
- Eric Bergoust, also of Missoula, won an Olympic gold medal in freestyle aerial skiing at the 1998 Winter Olympics, also competing in 1994, 2002 and 2006 Olympics plus winning 13 World Cup titles.
- Maggie Voisin, of Whitefish, competed in the 2018 and 2022 Winter Olympics as a skier. She also qualified for the 2014 Winter Olympics but was unable to compete as she broke her ankle during training.

==== Sporting achievements ====
Montanans have been a part of several major sporting achievements:

- In 1889, Spokane became the first and only Montana horse to win the Kentucky Derby. For this accomplishment, the horse was admitted to the Montana Cowboy Hall of Fame in 2008.
- In 1904 a basketball team of young Native American women from Fort Shaw, after playing undefeated during their previous season, went to the Louisiana Purchase Exposition held in St. Louis in 1904, defeated all challenging teams and were declared to be world champions.
- In 1923, the controversial Jack Dempsey vs. Tommy Gibbons fight for the heavyweight boxing championship, won by Dempsey, took place in Shelby.

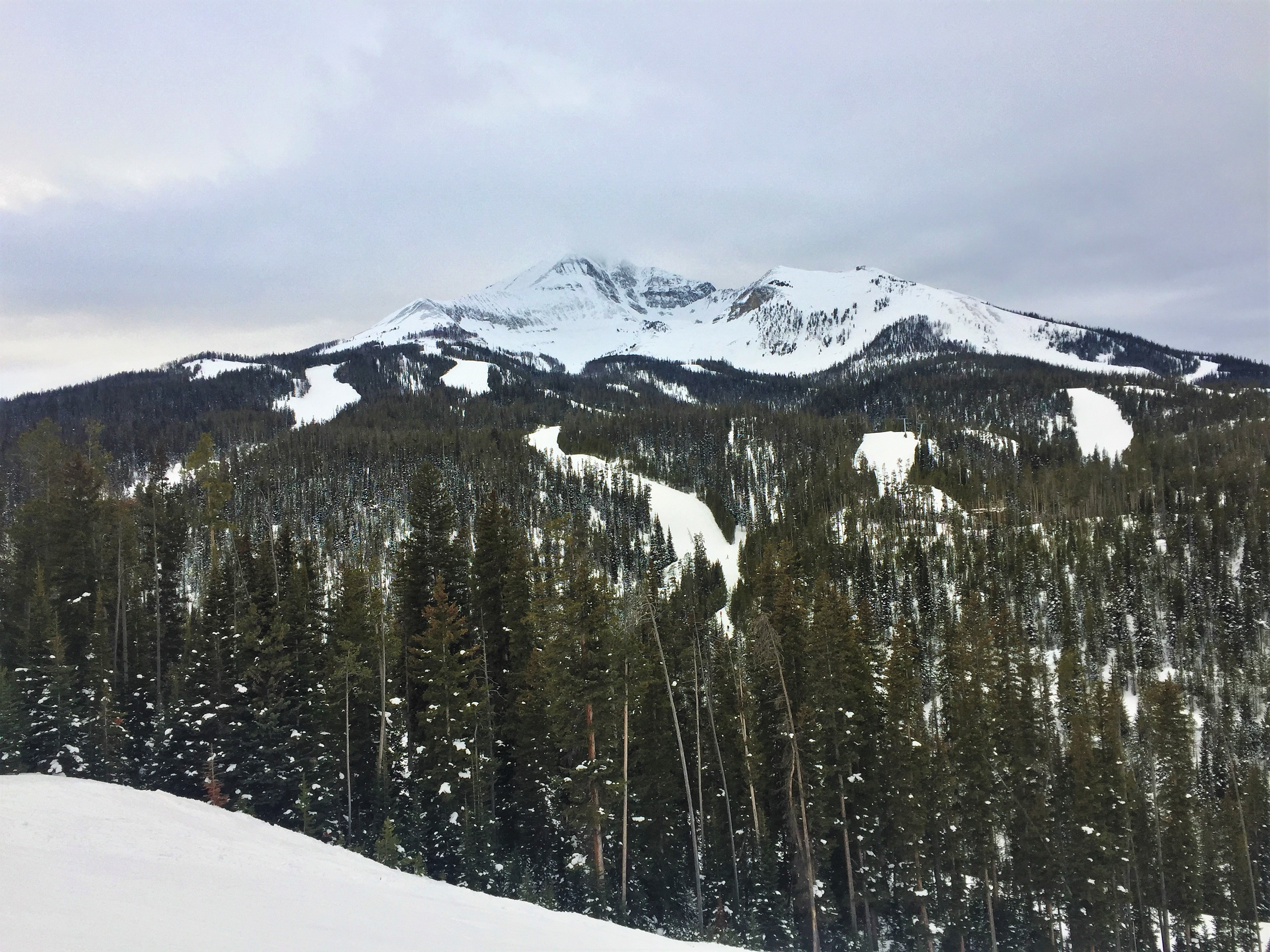
Lone Mountain at Big Sky Ski Resort

=== Nevada ===
The Las Vegas Valley is home to the Vegas Golden Knights of the National Hockey League who began to play in the 2017–18 NHL season at T-Mobile Arena on the Las Vegas Strip in Paradise, the Las Vegas Raiders of the National Football League who began play at Allegiant Stadium in Paradise in 2020 after moving from Oakland, California, and the Las Vegas Aces of the WNBA who began playing in 2018 at Mandalay Bay Events Center after relocating from San Antonio. The Oakland Athletics of Major League Baseball plan to move to Las Vegas by 2027.

Nevada takes pride in college sports, most notably its college football. College teams in the state include the Nevada Wolf Pack (representing the University of Nevada, Reno) and the UNLV Rebels (representing the University of Nevada, Las Vegas), both in the Mountain West Conference (MW).

UNLV is most remembered for its men's basketball program, which experienced its height of supremacy in the late 1980s and early 1990s. Coached by Jerry Tarkanian, the Runnin' Rebels became one of the most elite programs in the country. In 1990, UNLV won the Men's Division I Championship by defeating Duke 103–73, which set tournament records for most points scored by a team and largest margin of victory in the national title game.

In 1991, UNLV finished the regular season undefeated, a feat that would not be matched in Division I men's basketball for more than 20 years. Forward Larry Johnson won several awards, including the Naismith Award. UNLV reached the Final Four yet again, but lost their national semifinal against Duke 79–77. The Runnin' Rebels were the Associated Press pre-season No. 1 back to back (1989–90, 1990–91). North Carolina is the only other team to accomplish that (2007–08, 2008–09).

The state's involvement in major-college sports is not limited to its local schools. In the 21st century, the Las Vegas area has become a significant regional center for college basketball conference tournaments. The MW, West Coast Conference, and Western Athletic Conference all hold their men's and women's tournaments in the area, and the Pac-12 holds its men's tournament there as well. The Big Sky Conference, after decades of holding its men's and women's conference tournaments at campus sites, began holding both tournaments in Reno in 2016.

Las Vegas has hosted several professional boxing matches, most recently at the MGM Grand Garden Arena with bouts such as Mike Tyson vs. Evander Holyfield, Evander Holyfield vs. Mike Tyson II, Oscar De La Hoya vs. Floyd Mayweather Jr. and Oscar De La Hoya vs. Manny Pacquiao and at the newer T-Mobile Arena with Canelo Álvarez vs. Amir Khan.

Along with significant rises in popularity in mixed martial arts (MMA), a number of fight leagues such as the UFC have taken interest in Las Vegas as a primary event location due to the number of suitable host venues. The Mandalay Bay Events Center and MGM Grand Garden Arena are among some of the more popular venues for fighting events such as MMA and have hosted several UFC and other MMA title fights. The city has held the most UFC events with 86 events.

The state is also home to the Las Vegas Motor Speedway, which hosts NASCAR's Pennzoil 400 and South Point 400. Two venues in the immediate Las Vegas area host major annual events in rodeo. The Thomas & Mack Center, built for UNLV men's basketball, hosts the National Finals Rodeo. The PBR World Finals, operated by the bull riding-only Professional Bull Riders, was also held at the Thomas & Mack Center before moving to T-Mobile Arena in 2016.

The state is also home to famous tennis player, Andre Agassi, and current baseball superstar Bryce Harper.

=== New Mexico ===
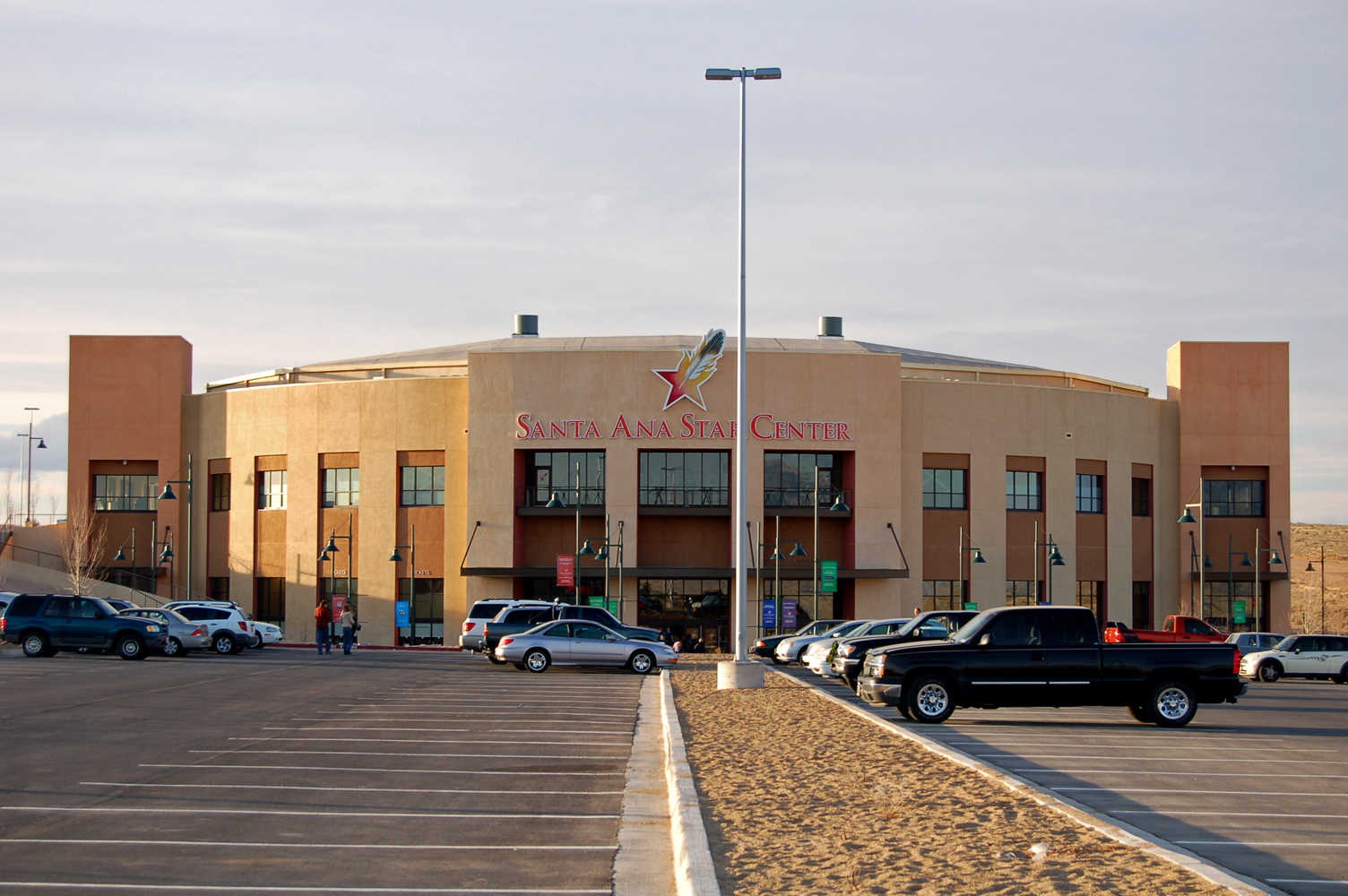
The Santa Ana Star Center

No major league professional sports teams are based in New Mexico, but the Albuquerque Isotopes are the Pacific Coast League baseball affiliate of the MLB Colorado Rockies. The state hosts several baseball teams of the Pecos League: the Roswell Invaders, Ruidoso Osos, Santa Fe Fuego, and the White Sands Pupfish. The Duke City Gladiators of the Indoor Football League (IFL) plays their home games at Tingley Coliseum in Albuquerque; the city also hosts two soccer teams: New Mexico United, which began playing in the second tier USL Championship in 2019, and the associated New Mexico United U23, which plays in the fourth tier USL League Two.

Collegiate athletics are the center of spectator sports in New Mexico, namely the rivalry between various teams of the University of New Mexico Lobos and the New Mexico State Aggies. The intense competition between the two teams is often referred to as the "Rio Grande Rivalry" or the "Battle of I-25" (both campuses are along that highway). NMSU also has a rivalry with the University of Texas at El Paso called "The Battle of I-10". The winner of the NMSU-UTEP football game receives the Silver Spade trophy.

Olympic gold medalist Tom Jager, an advocate of high-altitude training for swimming, has conducted training camps in Albuquerque at 5,312 feet (1,619 m) and Los Alamos at 7,320 feet (2,231 m).

New Mexico is a major hub for various shooting sports, mainly concentrated in the NRA Whittington Center in Raton, which is largest and most comprehensive competitive shooting range and training facility in the U.S.

=== Oregon ===
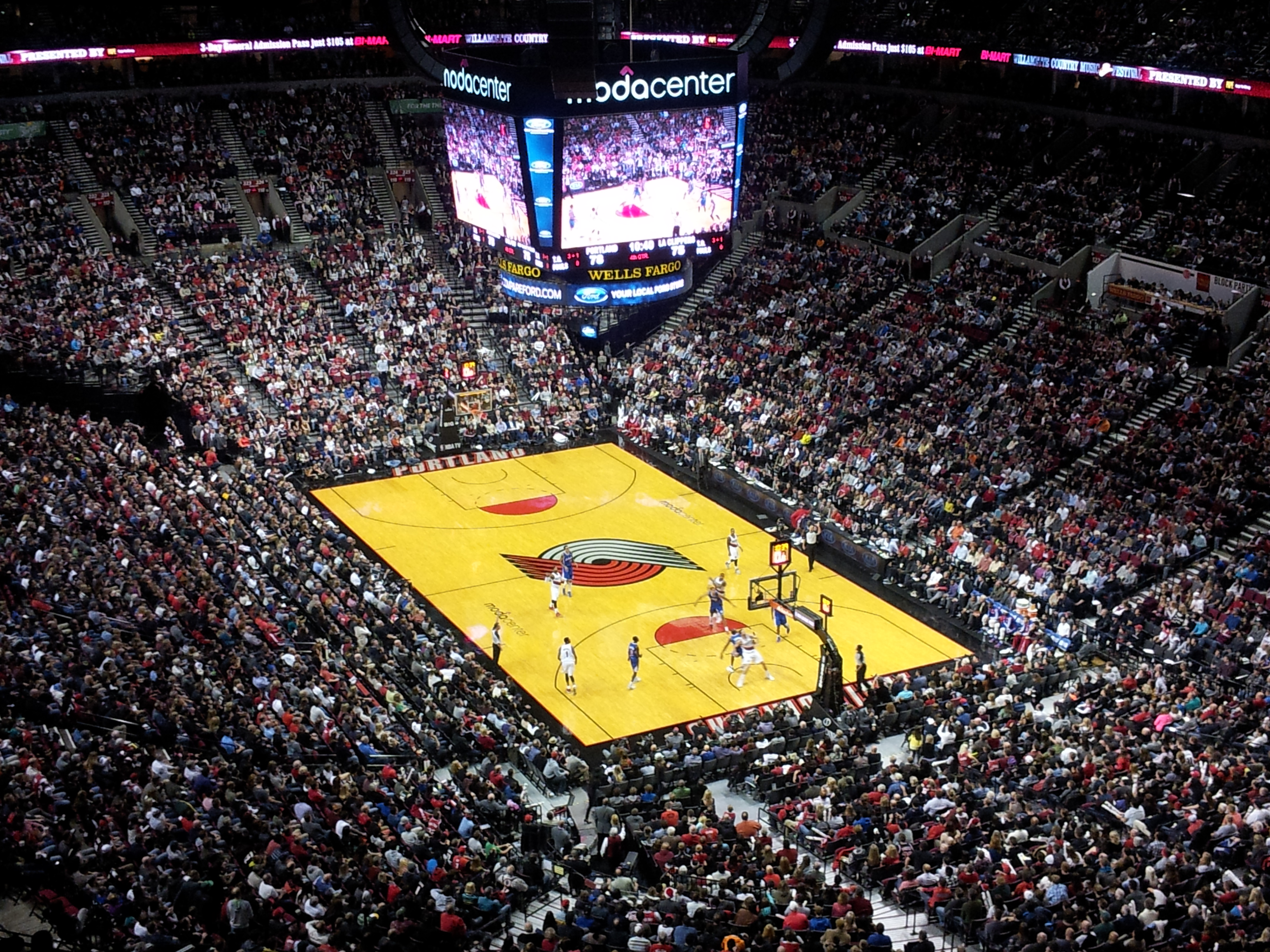
The Moda Center (formerly the Rose Garden) during a Portland Trail Blazers game

Oregon is home to four major professional sports teams: the Portland Trail Blazers of the NBA, the Portland Thorns FC of the NWSL, the Portland Timbers of MLS, and the Portland Fire of the WNBA.

Until 2011, the only major professional sports team in Oregon was the Portland Trail Blazers of the National Basketball Association. From the 1970s to the 1990s, the Blazers were one of the most successful teams in the NBA in terms of both win–loss record and attendance, including winning the 1977 NBA Finals behind star Bill Walton and reaching the 1992 NBA Finals with star Clyde Drexler. In the early 21st century, the team's popularity declined due to personnel and financial issues (an era when the team was derisively referred to as the Jail Blazers), but it was revived after the departure of controversial players and the acquisition of new stars such as Brandon Roy, LaMarcus Aldridge, and Damian Lillard. The Blazers play in the Moda Center in Portland's Lloyd District, which, as of 2026, also is home to the Portland Fire. The Portland Winterhawks of the junior Western Hockey League also play at the Moda Center.

The Portland Timbers play at Providence Park, just west of downtown Portland. The Timbers have a strong following, with the team regularly selling out its games. The Timbers repurposed the formerly multi-use stadium into a soccer-specific stadium in fall 2010, increasing the seating in the process. The Timbers operate Portland Thorns FC, a women's soccer team that has played in the National Women's Soccer League since the league's first season in 2013. The Thorns, who also play at Providence Park, have won three league championships: in the inaugural 2013 season, in 2017, and in 2022. The team has been by far the NWSL's attendance leader in each of the league's seasons.

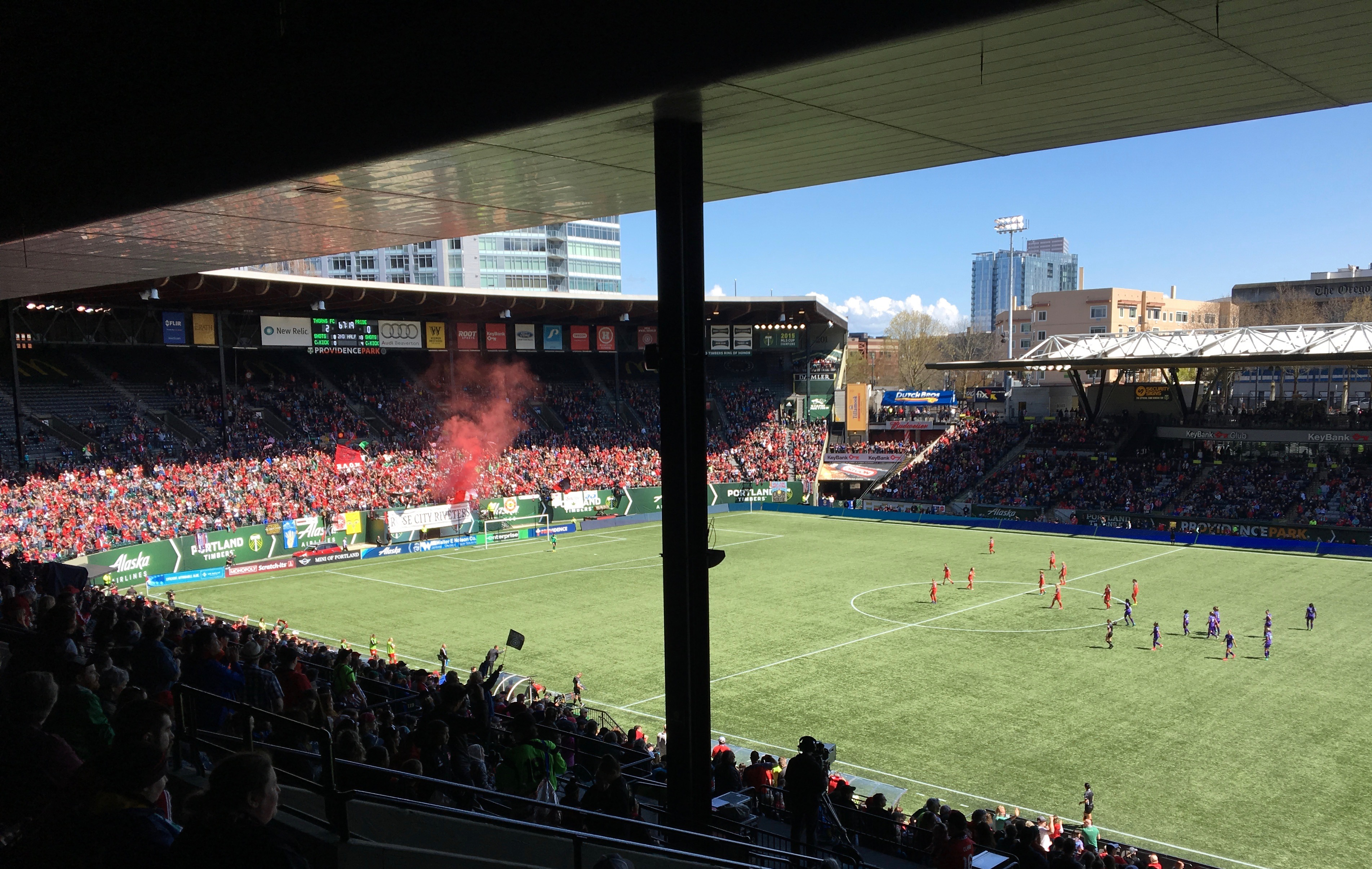
Providence Park during a Portland Thorns FC match

Eugene and Hillsboro have minor-league baseball teams: the Eugene Emeralds and the Hillsboro Hops both play in the High-A Northwest League. Portland has had minor-league baseball teams in the past, including the Portland Beavers and Portland Rockies, who played most recently at Providence Park when it was known as PGE Park. Salem also previously had a Class A Short Season Northwest League team, the Salem-Keizer Volcanoes that was not included in the 2021 Minor League Baseball reorganization. The Volcanoes ownership later formed the amateur Mavericks Independent Baseball League, which is fully based in Salem.

The Oregon State Beavers and the University of Oregon Ducks football teams of the Pac-12 Conference meet annually in the Oregon–Oregon State football rivalry. Both schools have had recent success in other sports as well: Oregon State won back-to-back college baseball championships in 2006 and 2007, winning a third in 2018; and the University of Oregon won back-to-back NCAA men's cross country championships in 2007 and 2008.

=== Utah ===
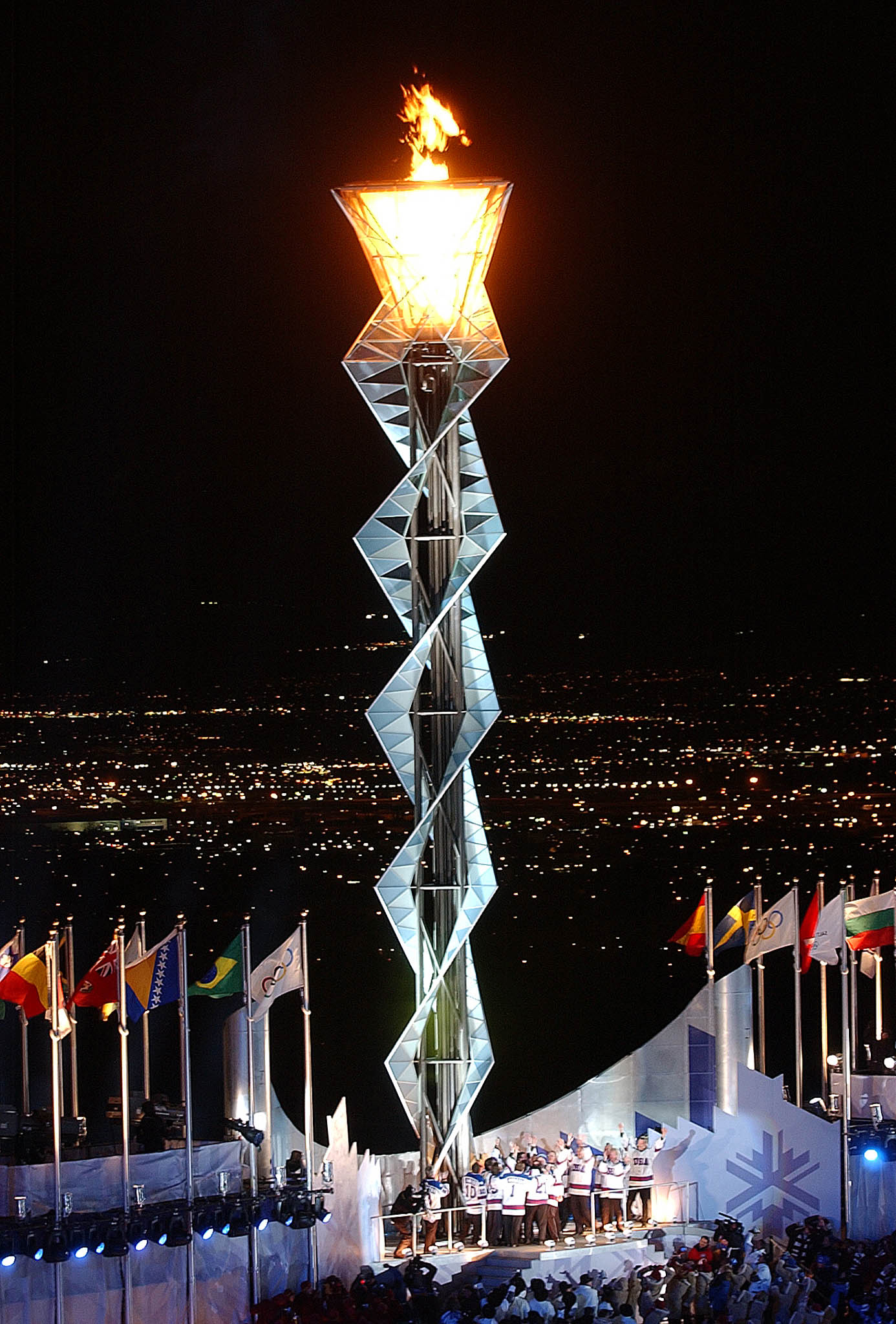
The Olympic cauldron is lit by the 'Miracle on Ice' 1980 U.S. men's ice hockey team at the opening ceremony of the 2002 Winter Olympics in Salt Lake City

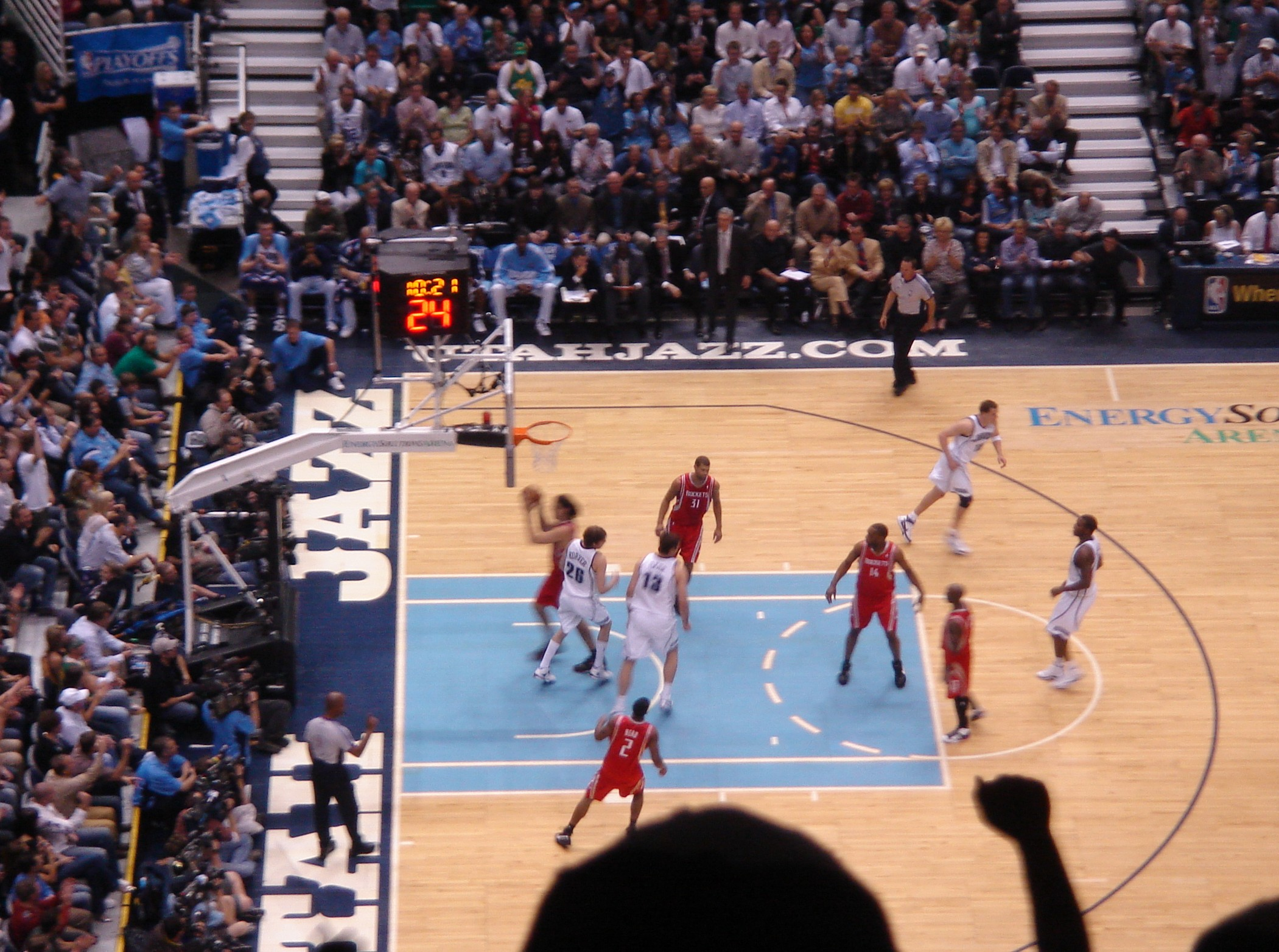
The Utah Jazz playing against the Houston Rockets

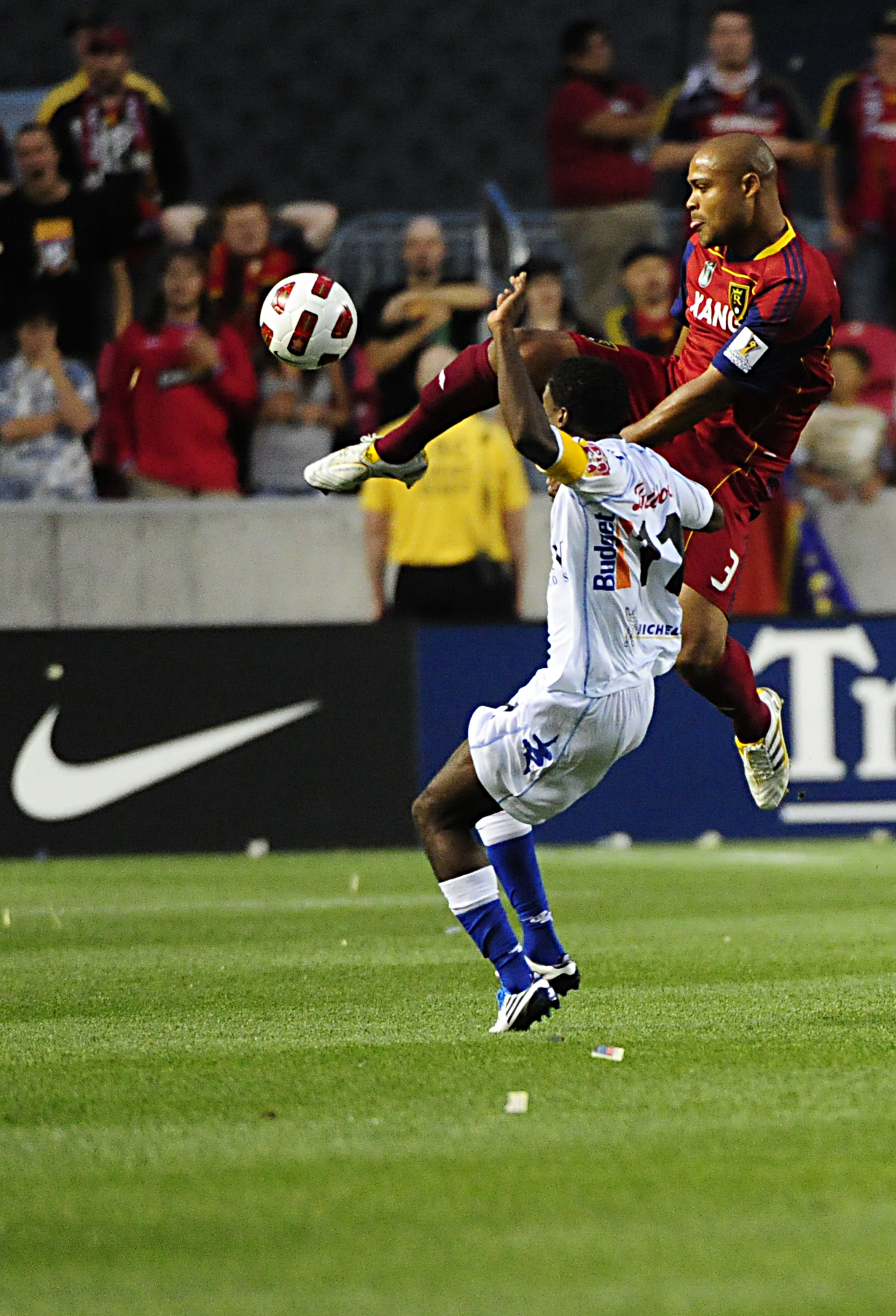
Robbie Russell playing for Real Salt Lake

Utah is the second-least populous U.S. state to have a major professional sports league franchise after the Vegas Golden Knights joined the National Hockey League in 2017. The Utah Jazz of the National Basketball Association play at the Delta Center in Salt Lake City. The team moved to the city from New Orleans in 1979 and has been one of the most consistently successful teams in the league (although they have yet to win a championship). The Salt Lake City Stars are the G League affiliate of the Jazz. The team moved from Idaho to Utah in 2016. Salt Lake City was previously host to the Utah Stars, who competed in the ABA from 1970 to 1976 and won one championship, and to the Utah Starzz of the WNBA from 1997 to 2003.

In 2024, the Utah Mammoth was established, beginning play during the 2024–25 National Hockey League season. The team was established using the existing roster, staff and draft picks of the Arizona Coyotes, which were purchased by businessman and Jazz owner Ryan Smith. The Utah Mammoth plays their home games at the Delta Center, sharing the facility with the Jazz. Utah previously had one minor league hockey team, the Utah Grizzlies, who played at the Maverik Center and competed in the ECHL. Following the death of team owner David Elmore, the team was sold and relocated to New Jersey after the 2026 season.

Real Salt Lake of Major League Soccer was founded in 2005 and plays their home matches at America First Field in Sandy. RSL remains the only Utah major league sports team to have won a national championship, having won the MLS Cup in 2009. RSL currently operates two adult teams in addition to the MLS side. Real Monarchs, competing in the third-tier MLS Next Pro, is the official reserve side for RSL. The team began to play in the 2015 season at Rio Tinto Stadium, remaining there until moving to Zions Bank Stadium, located at RSL's training center in Herriman, for the 2018 season and beyond. The Utah Royals returned to the National Women's Soccer League (NWSL), the top level of U.S. women's soccer, in 2024. The original team of that name, which shared ownership with RSL and also played at America First Field, started NWSL play in 2018. Due to fallout from controversies surrounding RSL's ownership, leading to the club's eventual sale, RSL shuttered the Royals after the 2020 season, selling its player-related assets to a new Kansas City franchise. Before the creation of the Royals, RSL's main women's side had been Real Salt Lake Women, which began play in the Women's Premier Soccer League in 2008 and moved to United Women's Soccer in 2016, before folding in 2019.

Utah's highest level Minor League Baseball team is the Triple-A Salt Lake Bees, as a part of the Pacific Coast League. The team previously played at Smith's Ballpark in Salt Lake City, but moved to The Ballpark at America First Square in Daybreak in 2025. Utah has one professional softball team, the Utah Talons of the Athletes Unlimited Softball League, who began play at Dumke Family Stadium in 2026.

Utah has seven universities that compete in Division I of the NCAA. Three of the schools have football programs that participate in the top-level Football Bowl Subdivision: BYU and Utah in the Big 12 Conference (with Utah moving from the Pac-12 Conference in 2024), and Utah State in the Mountain West Conference. In addition, Weber State and Southern Utah (SUU) compete in the Big Sky Conference of the FCS. Utah Tech, with an FCS football program, and Utah Valley, with no football program, are members of the Western Athletic Conference (WAC). Utah Tech football plays in the United Athletic Conference, a football-only partnership between the WAC and the Atlantic Sun Conference (ASUN). Most of these schools house select teams outside of their primary conferences; for example, BYU men's volleyball plays in the Mountain Pacific Sports Federation and Utah plays men's lacrosse in the ASUN.

Salt Lake City hosted the 2002 Winter Olympics. After early financial struggles and scandals, the 2002 Olympics eventually became among the most successful Winter Olympics in history from a marketing and financial standpoint. Watched by more than two billion viewers, the Games ended up with a profit of $100 million.

Utah has hosted professional golf tournaments such as the Uniting Fore Care Classic, and currently hosts the Utah Championship.

Rugby union has been growing quickly in the state of Utah, growing from 17 teams in 2009 to 70 as of 2013 with more than 3,000 players, and more than 55 high school varsity teams. The growth has been inspired in part by the 2008 movie Forever Strong. Utah fields two of the most competitive teams in the nation in college rugby—BYU and Utah. BYU has won the National Championship in 2009, 2012, 2013, 2014, and 2015. Formed in 2017, the Utah Warriors were a Major League Rugby (Union) team based in Salt Lake City which ceased operations at the conclusion of the 2025 Major League Rugby season.

Rugby league is also played in Utah, through the Utah Rugby League Association which runs a 4-team competition with teams based in Provo, Bluffdale, Riverton and Lehi.

=== Washington ===
Pickleball, a racquet sport invented on Bainbridge Island in 1965, was designated as Washington's official state sport in 2022. For three years in a row, 2021, 2022 and 2023, the sport was named the fastest growing sport in the United States by the Sports and Fitness Industry Association (SFIA).

==== Major professional teams ====
Club	Sport	League	Stadium and city
Seattle Kraken	Ice hockey	National Hockey League (West)	Climate Pledge Arena, Seattle
Seattle Mariners	Baseball	Major League Baseball (AL)	T-Mobile Park, Seattle
Seattle Reign FC	Soccer	National Women's Soccer League	Lumen Field, Seattle
Seattle Seahawks	Football	National Football League (NFC)	Lumen Field, Seattle
Seattle Sounders FC	Soccer	Major League Soccer (West)	Lumen Field, Seattle
Seattle Storm	Basketball	Women's National Basketball Association	Climate Pledge Arena, Seattle
Seattle Torrent	Ice hockey	Professional Women's Hockey League	Climate Pledge Arena, Seattle

==== Minor professional and amateur teams ====
Club	Sport	League	Stadium and city
Ballard FC	Soccer	USL League Two	Interbay Stadium, Seattle
Everett AquaSox	Baseball	Pacific Coast League (High-A)	Everett Memorial Stadium, Everett
Everett Silvertips	Ice hockey	Western Hockey League	Angel of the Winds Arena, Everett
Midlakes United	Soccer	USL League Two	Bellevue College Soccer Field, Bellevue
FC Olympia	Soccer	USL League Two	Well 80 Pitch, Olympia
Seattle Sea Dragons	American football	XFL	Lumen Field, Seattle
Seattle Majestics	American football	Women's Football Alliance	French Field, Kent
Seattle Mist	Indoor football	Legends Football League	ShoWare Center, Kent
Seattle Saracens	Rugby union	Canadian Direct Insurance Premier League	Magnuson Park, Seattle
Seattle Seawolves	Rugby union	Major League Rugby	Starfire Stadium, Tukwila
Seattle Thunderbirds	Ice hockey	Western Hockey League	ShoWare Center, Kent
Spokane Chiefs	Ice hockey	Western Hockey League	Spokane Arena, Spokane
Spokane Indians	Baseball	Pacific Coast League (High-A)	Avista Stadium, Spokane
Spokane Velocity	Soccer	USL League One	One Spokane Stadium, Spokane
Spokane Zephyr FC	Soccer	USL Super League	One Spokane Stadium, Spokane
Tacoma Defiance	Soccer	MLS Next Pro	Cheney Stadium, Tacoma
Tacoma Rainiers	Baseball	Pacific Coast League (Triple-A)	Cheney Stadium, Tacoma
Tacoma Stars	Indoor soccer and Soccer	Major Arena Soccer League (indoor); USL League Two (outdoor)	ShoWare Center, Kent (indoor); Bellarmine Preparatory School, Tacoma
Tri-City Americans	Ice hockey	Western Hockey League	Toyota Center, Kennewick
Tri-City Dust Devils	Baseball	Pacific Coast League (High-A)	Gesa Stadium, Pasco
Wenatchee Wild	Ice hockey	Western Hockey League	Town Toyota Center, Wenatchee
West Seattle Junction FC	Soccer	USL League Two	Nino Cantu Southwest Athletics Complex, Seattle

==== Four-year college sports teams ====
NCAA Division I

- Washington Huskies (Big Ten Conference; Football Bowl Subdivision)
- Washington State Cougars (Pac-12 Conference; Football Bowl Subdivision)
- Gonzaga Bulldogs (West Coast Conference)
- Seattle Redhawks (West Coast Conference)
- Eastern Washington Eagles (Big Sky Conference; Football Championship Subdivision)

NCAA Division II

- Central Washington Wildcats
- Saint Martin's Saints
- Seattle Pacific Falcons
- Western Washington Vikings

NCAA Division III

- Pacific Lutheran Lutes
- Puget Sound Loggers
- Whitman Blues
- Whitworth Pirates

NAIA

- Northwest University Eagles
- Evergreen State College Geoducks
- Walla Walla University Wolves

==== Individual sports ====
The Seattle Open Invitational golf tournament was part of the PGA Tour from the 1930s to the 1960s. The GTE Northwest Classic was part of the Senior PGA Tour from 1986 to 1995, and the Boeing Classic since 2005. In addition, the 2015 U.S. Open was held at Chambers Bay, and several major tournaments were held at Sahalee Country Club.

Pacific Raceways is a motorsports venue that has hosted the Northwest Nationals of the NHRA Mello Yello Drag Racing Series and a round of the Trans-Am Series.

The WTA Seattle tennis tournament was part of the WTA Tour from 1977 to 1982.

=== Wyoming ===
Due to its sparse population, Wyoming lacks any major professional sports teams; the Gillette Mustangs, an indoor football team based in Gillette that began play in 2021 prior to their departure from the city in 2023, were previously the only professional team in the state. However, the Wyoming Cowboys and Cowgirls—particularly the football and basketball teams—are quite popular; their stadiums in Laramie are about 7,200 feet (2,200 m) above sea level, the highest in NCAA Division I. The Wyoming High School Activities Association also sponsors twelve sports and there are three junior ice hockey teams, all of which are members of the NA3HL. Casper has hosted the College National Finals Rodeo since 2001.

== Territories ==
=== American Samoa ===
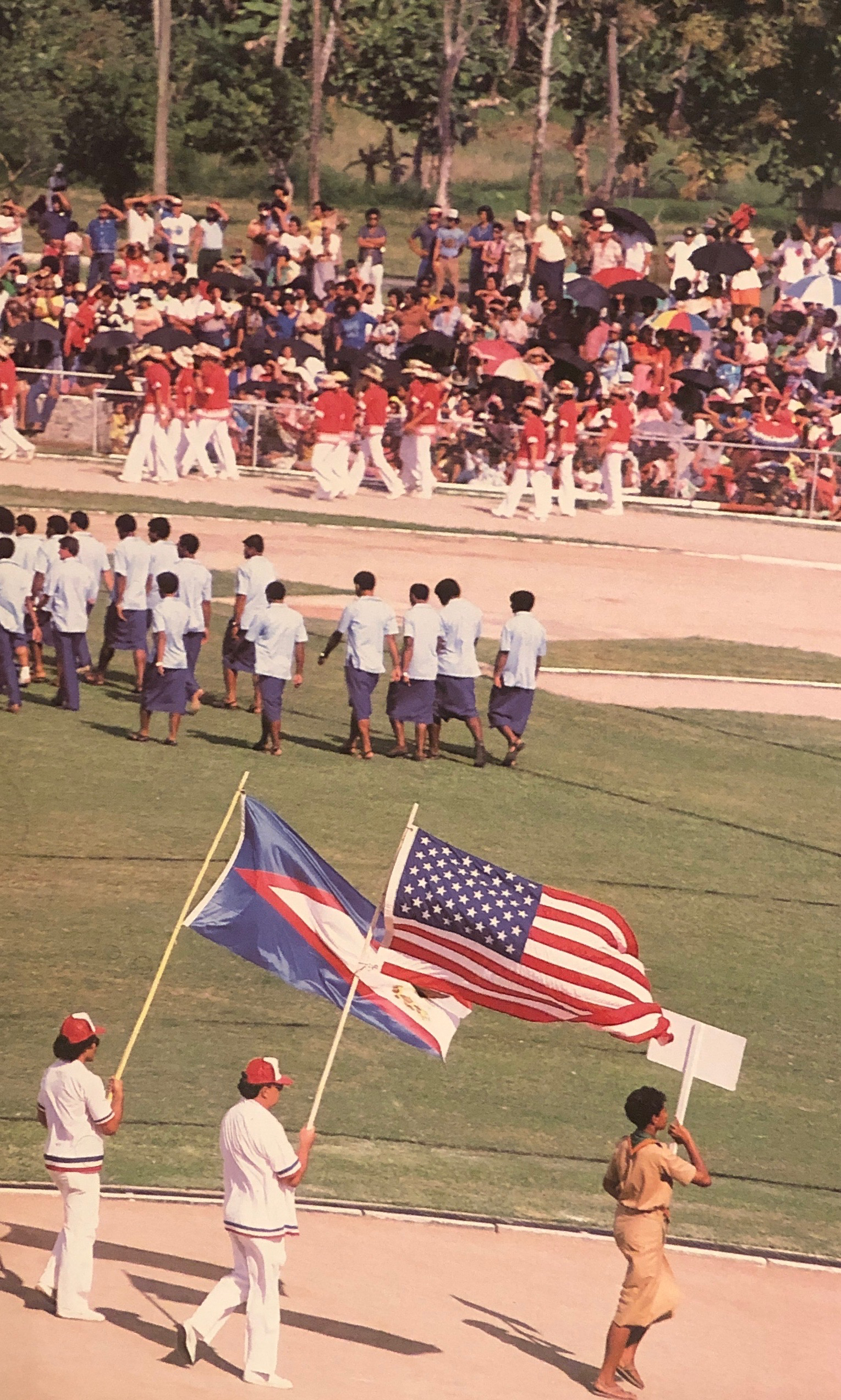
American Samoa at the South Pacific Games

The main sports played in American Samoa are football, Samoan cricket, canoeing, yachting, basketball, golf, netball, tennis, rugby, table tennis, boxing, bowling, volleyball, and fishing tournaments. Some current and former sports clubs are the American Samoa Tennis Association, Rugby Unions, Lavalava Golf Club, and Gamefish Association. Leagues improved and organized better after the completion of the Veterans Memorial Stadium.

The 1997 South Pacific Mini Games were the biggest international event ever to take place in American Samoa. The bid to host the games for the 23 participating countries was approved in May 1993. In January 1994, Governor A. P. Lutali appointed Fuga Teleso to head the task force charged with game preparations, including the construction of a stadium. Groundbreaking was in January 1994. The Governor later handed the task force on preparations to Lieutenant Governor Togiola. The task force merged with the American Samoa National Olympics Committee to better coordinate and facilitate preparations. V.P. Willis Construction built the 1,500-seat stands. The Department of Public Safety trained its force for special games security. The opening ceremony became extravagant where the U.S. Army Reserve carried the torch from Tula and Leone.

About 2,000 athletes, coaches, and sponsors attended from 19 countries and competed in 11 sports at the game. American Samoa fielded a team of 248 athletes. The team won 48 medals, 22 of which were gold medals, and American Samoa came in fourth overall in the ratings. American Samoa Rotary Club honored Fuga Tolani Teleso with the community's top award, the Paul Harris Fellowship Award, for his work on constructing the Veterans Memorial Stadium.

In 1982, yachters competed in the Hobie World Championship held in Tahiti. American Samoa beat the Apia team by half a point and won the Samoa Cup. In 1983, a team coached by Adele Satele-Galeai brought home the winning trophy from the Regional women's volleyball tournament in Hawaii. Also in 1983, the South Pacific Games were held in Apia. American Samoa received 13 medals: four gold, four silver, and five bronze. That same year, three junior golfers made the cut out of 1,000 players to attend the World Junior Golf Tournament in San Diego, California.

In 1987, American Samoa became the 167th member of the International Olympic Committee. The first South Pacific Junior Tennis Tournament was held at the Tafuna courts in January 1990.

Tony Solaita was the first American Samoan to play in Major League Baseball. There are thirty players from American Samoa in the National Football League (NFL) as of 2015 and over 200 play Div. I NCAA Football. Some American Samoan NFL football players are Shalom Luani, Junior Siavii, Jonathan Fanene, Mosi Tatupu, Shaun Nua, Isaac Sopoaga, and Daniel Teʻo-Nesheim.

After World War II, a Welfare and Recreation Department was created. This department arranged bowling, softball, badminton tournaments, basketball, and volleyball at various Tutuila locations. Boxing matches and dancing also became popular activities.

=== Guam ===
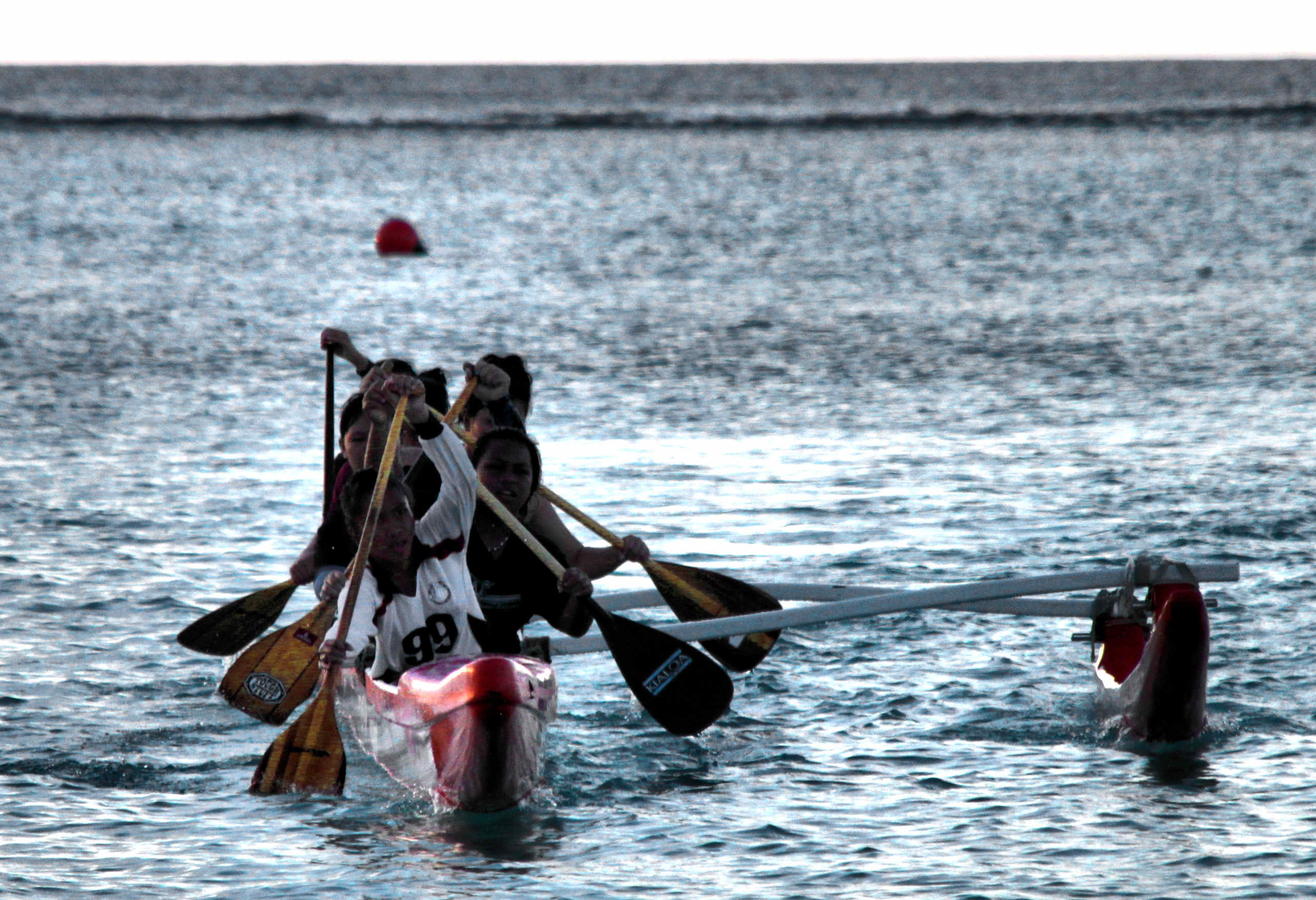
An outrigger canoe team at Tumon

Guam's most popular sport is American football, followed by basketball and baseball respectively. Soccer, Jiu Jitsu, and Rugby are also somewhat popular. Guam hosted the Pacific Games in 1975 and 1999. At the 2007 Games, Guam finished 7th of 22 countries in the medal count, and 14th at the 2011 Games.

Guam men's national basketball team and the women's team are traditional powerhouses in the Oceania region, behind the Australia men's national basketball team and the New Zealand national basketball team. As of 2019, the men's team is the reigning champion of the Pacific Games Basketball Tournament. Guam is home to various basketball organizations, including the Guam Basketball Association.

The Guam national football team was founded in 1975 and joined FIFA in 1996. It was once considered one of FIFA's weakest teams, and experienced their first victory over a FIFA-registered side in 2009. Guam hosted qualifying games on the island for the first time in 2015 and, in 2018, clinched their first FIFA World Cup Qualifying win. The Guam national rugby union team played its first match in 2005 and has never qualified for a Rugby World Cup.

As an aspect of cultural revival, sling competitions are also being organized on Guam. As a national pastime of cultural import, the ovoid shape on Guamanian flag is that of a sling stone.

=== Northern Mariana Islands ===
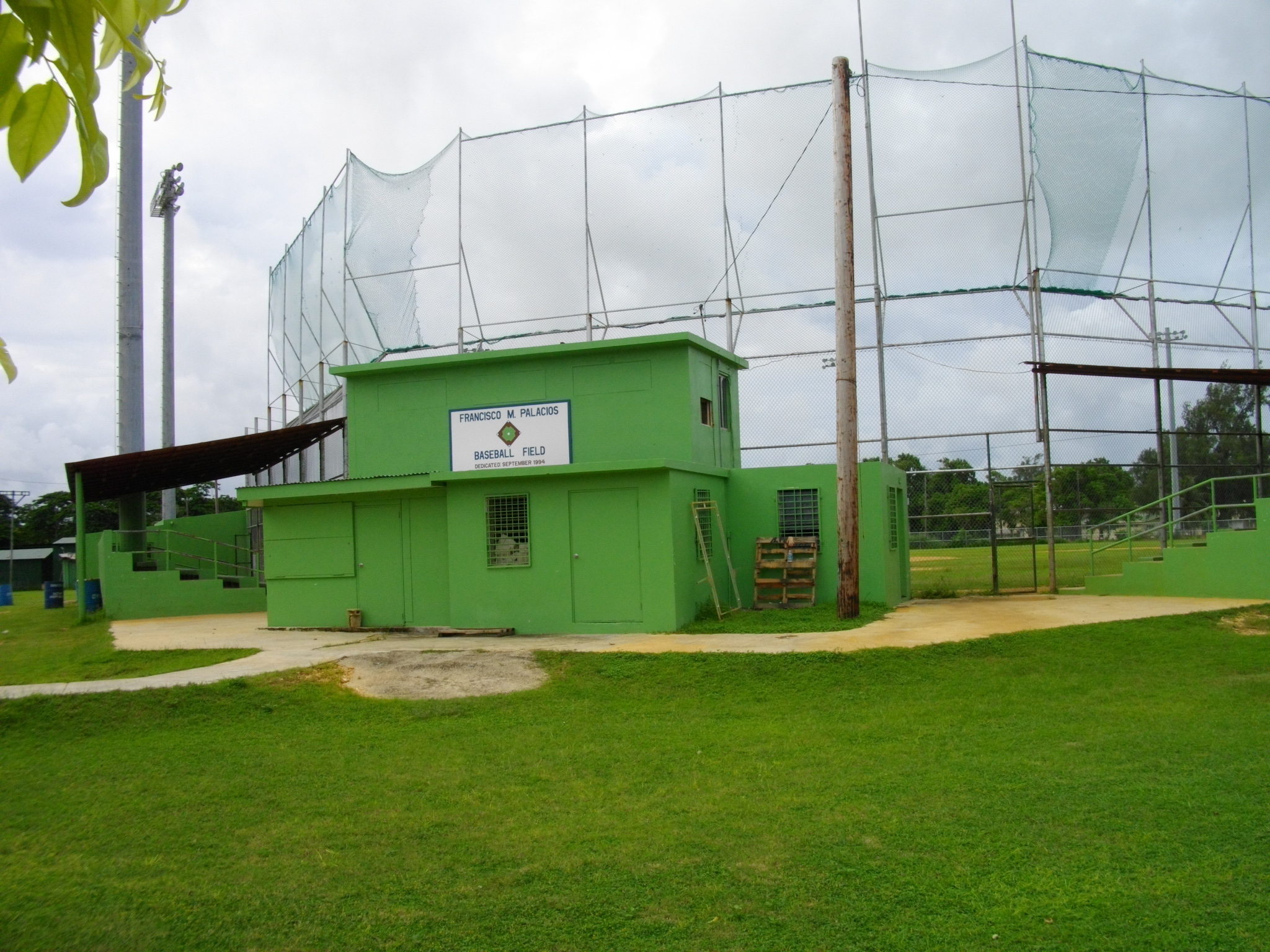
Francisco M. Palacios Baseball Field

Team sports prevalent in the United States were introduced to the Northern Mariana Islands by American soldiers during World War II. Baseball is the islands' most popular sport. CNMI teams have made appearances in the Little League World Series (in the Little, Junior, Senior, and Big league divisions) as well as winning gold medals in the Micronesian Games and South Pacific Games.

Basketball and mixed martial arts are also popular in the islands, which hosted the official 2009 Oceania Basketball Tournament. Trench Wars is the CNMI's Mixed Martial Arts brand. Fighters from the CNMI have competed in the Pacific Xtreme Combat as well as the UFC.

Other sports in the CNMI include Ultimate Frisbee, volleyball, tennis, soccer, outrigger sailing, softball, beach volleyball, rugby, golf, boxing, kickboxing, tae kwon do, track and field, swimming, triathlon, and football.

The islands have several golf courses, mostly on Saipan and often near resorts. There are four golf courses on Saipan as of the 2020s: Marianas Country Club, Laolao Bay Country Club, Coral Ocean Point Resort Clu, and Kingfisher Golf Links. To the south, Rota Island has another Rota Resort & Country Club. All the courses have 18 holes, but the level of difficulty varies.

=== Puerto Rico ===
Baseball was one of the first sports to gain widespread popularity in Puerto Rico. The Puerto Rico Baseball League serves as the only active professional league, operating as a winter league. No Major League Baseball franchise or affiliate plays in Puerto Rico; however, San Juan hosted the Montreal Expos for several series in 2003 and 2004 before they moved to Washington, D.C. and became the Washington Nationals.

The Puerto Rico national baseball team has participated in the World Cup of Baseball winning one gold (1951), four silver and four bronze medals, the Caribbean Series (winning fourteen times) and the World Baseball Classic. In March 2006, San Juan's Hiram Bithorn Stadium hosted the opening round as well as the second round of the newly formed World Baseball Classic. Puerto Rican baseball players include Hall of Famers Roberto Clemente, Orlando Cepeda and Roberto Alomar, enshrined in 1973, 1999, and 2011 respectively.

Boxing, basketball, and volleyball are popular sports as well. Wilfredo Gómez and McWilliams Arroyo have won their respective divisions at the World Amateur Boxing Championships. Other medalists include José Pedraza, who holds a silver medal, and three boxers who finished in third place, José Luis Vellón, Nelson Dieppa and McJoe Arroyo. In the professional circuit, Puerto Rico has the third-most boxing world champions and it is the global leader in champions per capita. These include Miguel Cotto, Félix Trinidad, Wilfred Benítez and Gómez among others.

The Puerto Rico national basketball team joined the International Basketball Federation in 1957. Since then, it has won more than 30 medals in international competitions, including gold in three FIBA Americas Championships and the 1994 Goodwill Games August 8, 2004, became a landmark date for the team when it became the first team to defeat the United States in an Olympic tournament since the integration of National Basketball Association players. Winning the inaugural game with scores of 92–73 as part of the 2004 Summer Olympics organized in Athens, Greece. Baloncesto Superior Nacional acts as the top-level professional basketball league in Puerto Rico and has experienced success since its beginning in 1930. Puerto Rico is a member of FIFA and CONCACAF. In 2008, the archipelago's first unified league, the Puerto Rico Soccer League, was established.

Other sports include professional wrestling and road running. The World Wrestling Council and International Wrestling Association are the largest wrestling promotions in the main island. The World's Best 10K, held annually in San Juan, has been ranked among the 20 most competitive races globally. The "Puerto Rico All Stars" team, which has won twelve world championships in unicycle basketball. Organized streetball has gathered some exposition, with teams like "Puerto Rico Street Ball" competing against established organizations including the Capitanes de Arecibo and AND1's Mixtape Tour Team. Six years after the first visit, AND1 returned as part of their renamed Live Tour, losing to the Puerto Rico Streetballers. Consequently, practitioners of this style have earned participation in international teams, including Orlando "El Gato" Meléndez, who became the first Puerto Rican born athlete to play for the Harlem Globetrotters.

Puerto Rico has representation in all international competitions including the Summer and Winter Olympics, the Pan American Games, the Caribbean World Series, and the Central American and Caribbean Games. Puerto Rico hosted the Pan Am Games in 1979 (officially in San Juan), and The Central American and Caribbean Games were hosted in 1993 in Ponce and in 2010 in Mayagüez. Puerto Rican athletes have won ten medals in Olympic competition (two gold, two silver, six bronze), the first one in 1948 by boxer Juan Evangelista Venegas. Monica Puig won the first gold medal for Puerto Rico in the Olympic Games by winning the Women's Tennis singles title in Rio 2016.

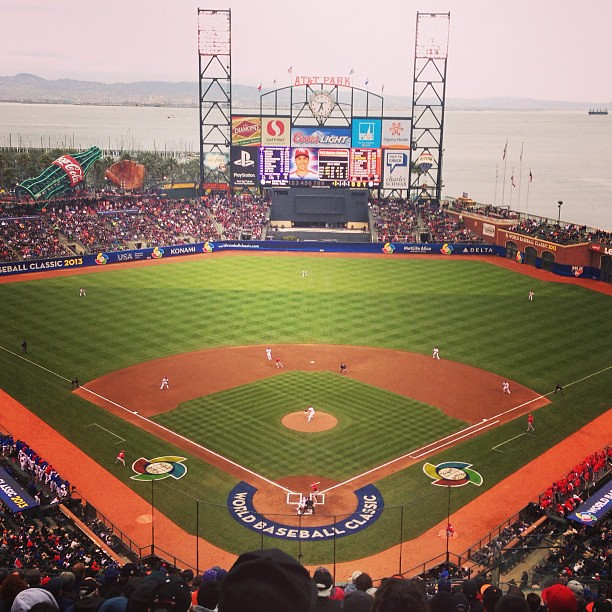
2013 World Baseball Classic championship between Puerto Rico and Dominican Republic, 20 March 2013

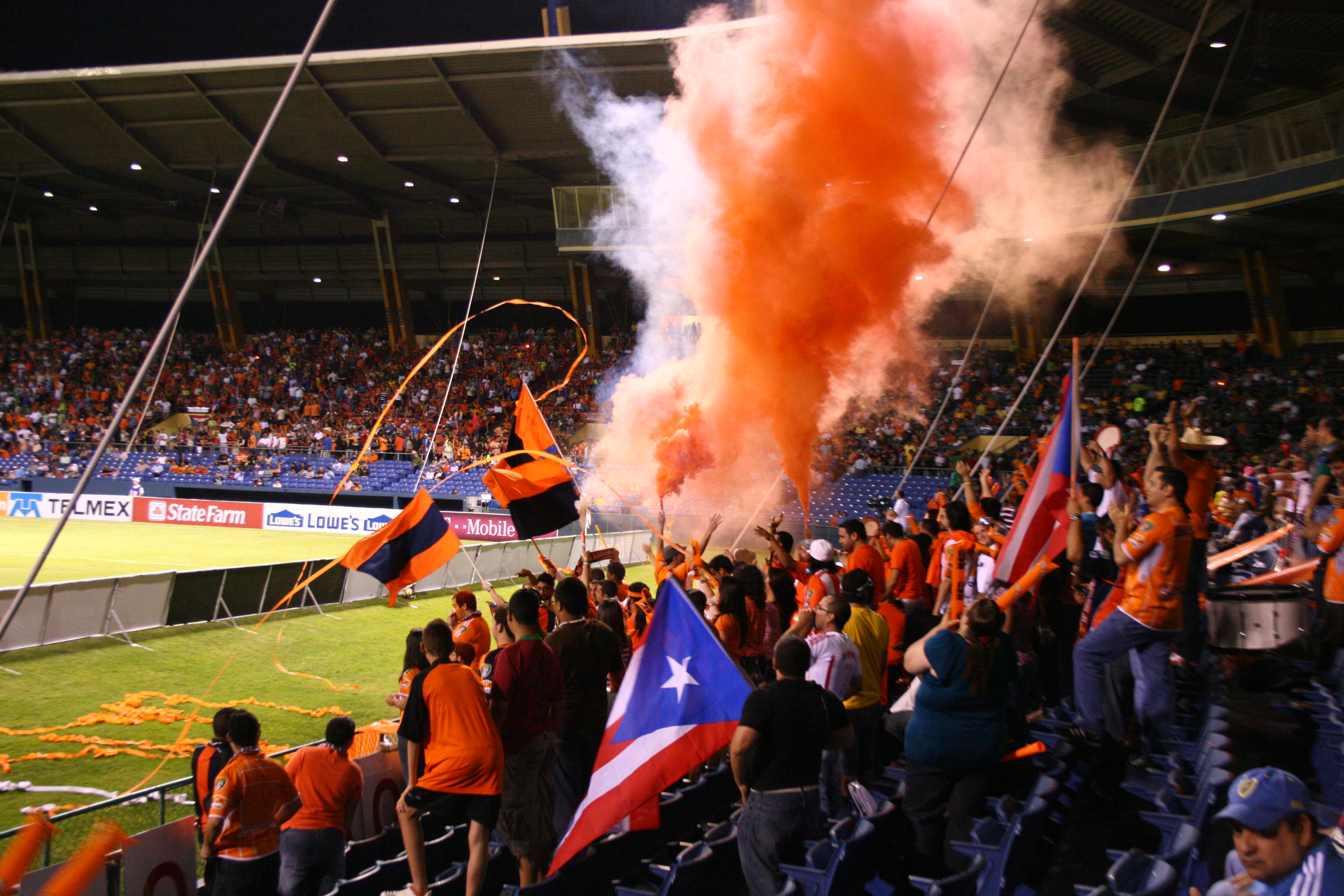
Puerto Rico Islanders fans at a soccer game

=== U.S. Virgin Islands ===
Basketball is one of the popular sports in the U.S. Virgin Islands. There is currently one player in the NBA from the U.S. Virgin Islands, 2019 NBA draft pick Nicolas Claxton, who plays for the Chicago Bulls. NBA Hall-of-Famer and five-time champion Tim Duncan of the San Antonio Spurs is also a native of the U.S. Virgin Islands. Consensus 2022 NCAA women's player of the year and USA national team member Aliyah Boston (University of South Carolina) was born and raised in St. Thomas.

In cricket, U.S. Virgin Islanders are eligible to compete internationally as part of the West Indies. The most recent U.S. Virgin Islander to be named to the West Indies squad is Hayden Walsh Jr., who was born in St. Croix. In regional Caribbean competitions, U.S. Virgin Islanders compete in List A and first-class cricket as part of the Leeward Islands cricket team. Currently, the U.S. Virgin Islands are not represented in Caribbean Twenty20 leagues.

There are also a men's and women's national soccer teams.

== See also ==
- Sports in the United States
- Women's sports in the United States
- Popular Games in United States by BallSportGear
